= List of long-distance motorcycle riders =

Long-distance motorcyclists with Wikipedia articles, with tours in chronological order.

== List of motorcycle riders and tours ==
Rider	Date	Motorcycle	Route	Distance	Support	Notes
George A. Wyman (USA 1877–1959)	1903	1902 California Motor Company motor bicycle	San Francisco–New York	3,800 mi (6,100 km)	Unsupported	First transcontinental crossing of the United States by motor vehicle
William Chadeayne	1905	Thomas Auto-Bi motorized bicycle	New York–San Francisco (via Chicago, Omaha, Cheyenne, Ogden, Reno, modern day I-80)	3,800 mi (6,100 km)	Unsupported	47-1/2 days, new record transcontinental crossing of the United States by motor vehicle
Carl Stearns Clancy (USA 1890–1971)	1912	1912 Henderson motorcycle	Circumnavigation. Dublin–New York	18,000 mi (29,000 km)	Unsupported	First man to go around the world with a motorcycle
Erwin "Cannonball" Baker (USA 1882–1960)	1912	1912 Indian motorcycle	United States, Jamaica, Cuba, central America	14,000 mi (23,000 km)	Unsupported	Demonstration tour sponsored by Indian
Erwin "Cannonball" Baker (USA 1882–1960)	1914	Indian V-twin motorcycle	San Diego–New York	3,378 mi (5,436 km)	Unsupported	New transcontinental record 11-1/2 days. Newspapers dubbed Baker "Cannonball" for the feat.
Avis and Effie Hotchkiss (USA)	1915	Harley-Davidson sidecar	New York–San Francisco–New York	9,000 mi (14,000 km)	Unsupported	First transcontinental crossing of the United States by women
Augusta and Adeline Van Buren (USA)	1916	Indian Power Plus	New York–Los Angeles	5,500 mi (8,900 km)	Unsupported	
Marjorie Cottle and Hugh Gibson (UK)	June 1–12, 1924	Raleigh	Circumnavigation of Great Britain (in opposite directions)	3,429 mi (5,518 km)		
Clare Frewen Sheridan and Oswald Frewen (brother)	July 1924–September 1924	799 cc, 7 hp AJS motorcycle–sidecar (Sheridan as passenger)	Sussex (UK)–Odessa via Holland, Germany, Czechoslovakia, Poland, USSR (Russia, Ukraine); shipped to Istanbul, then more travel in Turkey	4,226 mi (6,801 km)		First British motorcycle in the Soviet Union. Book, Across Europe with Satanella
Svend O. Heiberg (Denmark/USA) and Aksel Svane (Denmark)	1924–1925	Harley-Davidson sidecar	Circumnavigation. Europe, Turkey, Iraq, India, Sri Lanka, Malaysia, China, United States		Unsupported	To conduct forest research. Heiberg later became professor of silviculture in the U.S.
James C Wilson and Francis Flood	1927	Triumph motorcycles single cylinder with sidecars	First motorcycle crossing the continent of Africa. From Lagos, North of Lake Chad to Massawah on the Red Sea.	Estimated 3,400 miles (5470 km)	Unsupported	Travelogue, Three-Wheeling Through Africa, 1936. Self-filmed.
Marjorie Cottle, Louie McLean and Edyth Foley	1928	Raleigh, Douglas, and Triumph, respectively	Belgium, France, Italy, Switzerland, Germany, Sweden, Norway, Denmark and the Netherlands	7,000 miles (11,000 km)		Tour of European capitals celebrating the women's victory at the 1927 International Six Days Trial
Zoltán Sulkowsky and Gyula Bartha (Hungary)	1928–1936	Harley-Davidson	France, Italy, Spain, Portugal, Morocco, Algeria, Tunisia, Cairo, Jerusalem, Beirut, Syria, Turkey, Bulgaria, Bucharest, Budapest, Athens, Luxor, Sudan, Karachi, Bombay, Delhi, Lahore, Madras, Colombo, Australia, Padang, Singapore, Bangkok, Saigon, Hanoi, Hong Kong, Beijing, Nagasaki, Tokyo, Honolulu, San Francisco, Los Angeles, Chicago, Toronto, New York, Mexico, Havana, Panama, Chile, Brazil, London, Dublin, Brussels, Madrid, Nice, Bern, Zurich, Munich, Vienna, Budapest	170,000 km (110,000 mi)	Unsupported	First round the world on all inhabited continents (66 countries) with a motorcycle
Betty and Nancy Debenham (UK)	February 1929	BSA motorcycles	England	2,000 mi (3,200 km)	Unsupported	Toured 2,000 miles with no money to win a bet with Kaye Don
Bessie Stringfield (USA, 1911–1993)	1930s	Harley-Davidson	8 trips across US		Unsupported	
Max Reisch (Austria, 1912–1985)	1933–1934	Puch 250	Austria (Kufstein)–India (Bombay)	8,015 mi (12,899 km)	Pillion rider Herbert Tichy	First motorbike ride from Europe to India
Robert Edison Fulton, Jr. (USA, 1909–2004)	1932–1933 (18 months)	Douglas twin cylinders	Hemispherical route through 22 countries. From London and across Central and Southeastern Europe, Turkey, Syria, Lebanon, Iraq (across the Northern Arabian Desert), British India, Southeast Asia, China, and Japan.	40,000 km (25,000 mi)	Unsupported	Travelogues: book, One Man Caravan, and a film:The One Man Caravan of Robert E. Fulton, Jr. An Autofilmography
Theresa Wallach and Florence Blenkiron	11 December 1934 – 29 July 1935	600 cc single-cylinder Panther with sidecar and trailer	London to Cape Town	13,500 mi (21,700 km)	Unsupported	Parts recorded on film and in Wallach's book, The Rugged Road
John Penton	1958	BMW R69S	North America transcontinental, New York to Los Angeles	2,833 mi (4,559 km)		Transcontinental crossing record, 52 hours and 11 minutes
John Gerber (USA, 1945–2010)	1966 (2 months)	Vespa GS 160 single cylinder scooter	Continental route through 8 countries. From Minneapolis to Panama and back through the USA, Mexico, British Honduras, Guatemala, Honduras, El Salvador, Nicaragua, Costa Rica, and Panama.	11,000 mi (18,000 km)	Unsupported	Travelogues: blog South to Panama and Back
John Gerber (USA, 1945–2010)	1971 (2 years)	Vespa SS 180 single cylinder scooter	Hemispherical route through 21 countries. From Menomonie, Wisconsin to Cape Horn through the USA, Mexico, British Honduras, Guatemala, Honduras, El Salvador, Nicaragua, Costa Rica, Panama, Colombia, Venezuela, Dutch Guiana, Guyana, French Guiana, Brazil, Paraguay, Uruguay, Argentina, Chile, Bolivia, Peru, Ecuador, and north through central America again. Gerber intended ride through Canada to reach Alaska, but his ride was cut short when he was hit by a car in Hayward, California.	25,000 mi (40,000 km)	Unsupported	Travelogues: blog South to Panama and Back
John Gerber (USA, 1945–2010)	1978 (1 years)	Vespa Rally 180 single cylinder scooter	Circumnavigating through 23 countries. From Singapore to London through the Singapore, Malaysia, Thailand, Burma, India, Bangladesh, Pakistan, Iran, Iraq, Jordan, Israel, Lebanon, Syria, Turkey, Greece, Italy, Vatican City, Switzerland, Germany, Belgium, Netherlands, France, and England.	20,000 mi (32,000 km)	Unsupported	Travelogues: blog South to Panama and Back
Peter Thoeming and Dr Charlie Carter	1978-1981	Honda XL 250s	Sydney to Dublin and on through USA.	46,000 mi (74,000 km)	Unsupported	Book: Motorcycle Touring Radio: ABC 2JJ
Anne-France Dautheville (France)	1972–73	Kawasaki 125		12,500 mi (20,100 km)		First woman to motorcycle solo around the world.
David McGonigal (Australia, b.1950)	1970s (4 years)	Yamaha RD350	Circumnavigating via Asia, Europe, North America.			First World Tour
Ted Simon (UK, b. 1931)	1973–1977	Triumph Tiger 500cc	Circumnavigating. 1973: England, France, Italy, Sicily, Tunisia, Sudan, Ethiopia. 1974: Kenya, Tanzania, Zambia, Botswana, Rhodesia, South Africa, Swaziland, Mozambique, Brazil, Argentina, Chile. 1975: Bolivia, Peru, Ecuador, Colombia, Panama, Nicaragua, Costa Rica, Honduras, Guatemala, Mexico, USA, Fiji, New Zealand, Australia. 1976: Singapore, Malaysia, Thailand, India, Sri Lanka, Nepal. 1977: Pakistan, Afghanistan, Iran, Turkey, Greece, Yugoslavia (formerly), Austria, Germany, Switzerland, France, England. (49 countries)	78,000 mi (126,000 km)	Unsupported	Jupiter's Travels
Walter Muma (Canada, b. 1956)	1978	Motobécane Mobylette 50 cc moped	Toronto to Alaska and Inuvik via gravel Alaska Highway, and back	11,500 mi (18,500 km)	Unsupported	
Helge Pedersen (Norway)	1982–1992	BMW R80G/S	Circumnavigation: 77 countries on every inhabited continent	250,000 mi (400,000 km)	Unsupported	First south-to-north crossing of Panama's Darién Gap by motorcycle Book: 10 Years on 2 Wheels
Emilio Scotto (Argentina, b. 1956)	1985–1995	1980 Honda Gold Wing GL1100	Circumnavigating. All of Europe, all of Africa, all of the Middle East, Central Asia, East Asia, Southeast Asia, Australia, New Zealand, some Pacific islands, and all of North and South America (279 countries)	735,000 km (457,000 mi)		Guinness record for the world's longest motorcycle ride. Travelogue: The Longest Ride: My Ten-Year 500,000 Mile Motorcycle Journey
Jim Rogers (USA, b. 1942), Tabitha Estabrook	January 1991–November 1992	BMW (x2)	Circumnavigating . Section 1: Ireland, across Europe, Russia (Europe and Siberia), Japan. Section 2: Japan, China, Karakoram Highway, Pakistan, Central Asia, Caucasus, Turkey, across Europe and back to Ireland. Section 3: Ireland, Southern Europe to Northern Africa, across the Sahara through Tamanrasset, Central and Southern Africa to Cape Town. Section 4: Australia and New Zealand. Section 5: Ushuaia, Patagonia, Chile, Peru, Columbia, Central America, Mexico, Eastern USA to New York, across Canada to Alaska, Pacific Coast to San Francisco (52 countries)	105,000 km (65,000 mi)		Travelogue: Investment Biker. Videos: The Long Ride, The Party's Over
Nick Sanders (UK)	1992	Royal Enfield Bullet	Circumnavigating	61,200 km (38,000 mi)		
Dave Barr (USA, b. 1952)	1994–1996	Harley-Davidson	Circumnavigating. Section 1: USA, Canada, Mexico, Central America, Southern America (Atlanticantic loop) to Ushuaia, Chile, Southern and Central Africa, North Africa (across the Sahara through Tamanrasset), Central and Northern Europe (winter time), Russia (Europe and Siberia in winter time), Mongolia (winter time), China, Southeast Asia. Section 2: Australia (about 40 countries)	133,575 km (83,000 mi)		Dave made the trip on a 1972 Harley-Davidson® motorcycle with two prosthetic legs. Travelogue: Riding the Edge, Riding the Ice
Andy Goldfine (USA) and Helge Pedersen (USA/Norway)	1996	2 × BMW R80G/S	North America: Duluth to Seattle (Goldfine); Hyder, Alaska; Anchorage. Asia: Magadan, Siberia; Lake Baikal; Ulan Ude; Mongolia; Beijing; Vladivostok; Sakhalin Island; Holmsk; Hokkaido; Yokohama. North America: Los Angeles to Seattle (Pedersen) and LA to Duluth (Goldfine).	17,000 mi (27,000 km)		
Austin Vince, Gerald Vince, Chas Penty, Bill Penty, Clive Greenhough, Nick Stubley, Mark Friend, Louis Bloom	1995–1996	Suzuki DR350	Circumnavigating. London, through Central Asia, Kazakhstan and Siberia to Magadan across the Road of Bones to Magadan, then from Alaska to Chile, and finally from Cape Town through Africa and the Middle East back to London	65,000 km (40,000 mi)	Unsupported, filmed	TV series and book: Mondo Enduro
Benka Pulko (Slovenia, b. 1967)	June 1997–December 2002	BMW F650	Circumnavigating. Europe, Russia, Egypt, Middle East (including Saudi Arabia), South Asia, Southeast Asia, South America, North America, Australia (75 countries)	180,015 km (111,856 mi)	Unsupported	Guinness Record for the longest distance and duration solo motorcycle ride by a woman. First motorcyclist to ride in Antarctica. First woman to ride solo across Saudi Arabia.
David McGonigal	1997–1999	BMW R1100RT	Circumnavigating . Section 1: Australia, Chile, Antarctica, Ushuaia, South America to Alaska. Section 2: Australia, Vladivostok, Siberia, Mongolia, Russia (Europe), Europe, Morocco, back to Europe. Section 3: New Zealand, Pacific islands.	114,063 km (70,875 mi)		The First Seven-Continent Motorcycle
Nick Sanders	June 1997	Triumph	Circumnavigating	32,070 km (19,930 mi)		Record for circumnavigating the Earth on a motorcycle in 31 days and 20 hours. Travelogue: Fastest Man Around the World.
Jūgatsu Toi	1997–2002	Honda XRV750 Africa Twin, Honda NX650	North America, Australia, Africa, South America, Eurasia	120,000 km (75,000 mi)		2010 NHK television documentary covered 30,000 km Eurasian leg
Nick Sanders	1998–	Yamaha YZF-R1	Circumnavigating. Seven complete world tours			Books: Anatomy of an Adventurer, Parallel Coast, Parallel World–Around the Globe on an R1, Loneliness of the Long-Distance Biker, Fastest Man Around the World, Journey Beyond Reason, Biker Britain, Timbuktu–In Search of the Dakar Rally and Timbuktu
Neil Peart	1998–1999	BMW R1100GS	Quebec–Alaska–Mexico–Central America	88,000 km (55,000 mi)	Unsupported	Book: Ghost Rider: Travels on the Healing Road. His BMW was on display at Motorcycle Hall of Fame Museum.
Pat Garrod and Vanessa Lewis	1998–2002	BMW R100GS	Circumnavigation — 64 countries, 6 continents	100,007 mi (160,946 km)	Unsupported	Book: Bearback — The World Overland
Chris Ratay and Erin Doherty-Ratay	1999–2003	BMW F650 and BMW R100PD	Circumnavigation — 50 countries, 6 continents	101,322 mi (163,062 km)	Unsupported	Claim Guinness World Record for distance ridden (team)
Vladimir Yarets	2000–present (As of July 2014)	Jawa 350 and BMW F650GS	Circumnavigation	More than 100,000 mi (160,000 km)	Unsupported	Rider is deaf
Sjaak Lucassen	2001	Yamaha R1 Honda Fireblade	Around the world, Polar Ice	458,000 km (285,000 mi)		Autobiography: Leven op 2 wielen Documentary: Sjaak the World (2010)
Ted Simon (UK, b. 1931)	2001–2004	BMW R80G/S	Circumnavigating. 48 countries in North America, Asia, Europe, Africa, South America, Australasia	88,000 km (55,000 mi)	Unsupported	Dreaming of Jupiter
Simon and Monika Newbound (UK)	May 2002–October 2003	BMW R1150GS, BMW F650GS	Circumnavigating. All of Europe, Turkey, Caucasus, Iran, Russia (Europe and Siberia), Mongolia, China, USA, Canada, Mexico, Cuba, Haiti	189,000 km (117,000 mi)	Unsupported	Guinness Endurance Record. Crossed the USA 5 times and the Arctic circle 3 times.
Kevin Sanders (UK, b.1964), Julia Sanders (UK) (passenger)	June 2002	BMW R1150GS	Circumnavigating . Alaska to Florida across Canada and the USA, Europe to Turkey, Iran, Dubai, Australia, New Zealand, and back to Alaska (12 countries)	31,319 km (19,461 mi)		Guinness Record for the fastest circumnavigation of the world by motorcycle, in 19 days 8 hours and 25 minutes.
Kevin Sanders (UK, b.1964), Julia Sanders (UK) (passenger)	August–September 2003	BMW R1150GS Adventure	Hemispherical. Prudhoe Bay, Alaska, across the USA, Mexico, Central America, Columbia, Ecuador, Peru, Chile and Argentina (Ushuaia) (13 countries)	27,200 km (16,900 mi)		Guinness Record for the fastest Pan-American motorcycle ride, in 35 days. TV series: The Ride: Alaska to Patagonia (National Geographic, 2005).
Kanichi Fujiwara (Japan, b. 1961), Hiroko Fujiwara (Japan, b. 1962)	March 2004–June 2008	Yamaha Passol electric scooter and Yamaha Majesty scooter	Circumnavigating. Australia, Thailand, India to Scotland, Scandinavia, Africa, America from New York to San Francisco. (44 countries).	50,552 km (31,412 mi)	Unsupported, sponsored by Yamaha	May be first circumnavigation by electric scooter or electric motorcycle. Scooter weighed 45 kg (99 lb), with 30 km/h top speed, 20 km battery endurance.
Ewan McGregor (UK, b. 1971), Charley Boorman (UK, b. 1966)	April–July 2004	BMW R1150GS Adventure	Circumnavigating. UK, France, Belgium, Germany, Czech Republic, Slovakia, Ukraine, Russia, Kazakhstan, Mongolia, USA, Canada, ending in New York (12 countries)	30,396 km (18,887 mi)	Truck and crew	Documentary TV series & book: Long Way Round
Allan Karl (U.S.)	2005–2008	BMW F650GS Dakar	5 continents	62,000 mi (100,000 km)	Unsupported	Book: FORKS—A Quest for Culture, Cuisine, and Connection
Jeffrey Polnaja (Indonesia)	2006–2015	BMW R1150GS Adventure	Circumnavigated thorough 97 countries	440,000 kilometres (270,000 mi)	Solo unsupported	The first Indonesian to circumnavigate. Book: Wind Rider
Bharadwaj Dayala (India, b. 1969)	Apr 2006-Oct 2007	Hero Honda Karizma	India, Iran, Turkey, Syria, Jordan, Egypt, Greece, Italy, France, UK, Canada, USA, New Zealand, Australia, Indonesia, Bangladesh (15 countries)	47,000 km (29,000 mi)	Unsupported and unsponsored	Book: Ride the World
Woodrow Landfair (USA, b. 1982)	May 2006-Oct 2007	Suzuki Intruder 800	48 contiguous states, United States of America	94,000 km (58,000 mi)	Unsupported and unsponsored	Book: Land of the Free
Ewan McGregor (UK, b. 1971), Charley Boorman (UK, b. 1966)	May–August 2007	BMW R1200GS Adventure	Hemispherical. UK, France, Italy, Tunisia, Libya, Egypt, Sudan, Ethiopia, Kenya, Uganda, Rwanda, Tanzania, Malawi, Zambia, Botswana, Namibia, South Africa (17 countries)	19,500 km (12,100 mi)	Truck and crew	Documentary TV series: Long Way Down
Cathy Birchall (UK, 1957 – 2013), Bernard Smith (UK, b. 1955)	August 2008–August 2009	BMW R100RT	Hemispherical. UK, Ireland, France, Switzerland, Italy, Croatia, Bosnia, Montenegro, Kosovo, Macedonia, Greece, Turkey, Pakistan, India, Nepal, Thailand, Malaysia, Australia, Chile, Peru, Ecuador, Colombia, Panama, Costa Rica, Nicaragua, Honduras, El Salvador, Guatemala, Mexico, USA, Canada (31 countries)	26,385 miles (42,463 km)	Alone	Book: Touching the World: A Blind woman, Two Wheels and 25,000 Miles
Simon Gandolfi (UK, b. 1933)	2008–2013	125 cc Honda (America); 125 cc TVS Phoenix (India)	Mexico to Tierra del Fuego via Mexico, Guatemala, Honduras, Nicaragua, Costa Rica, Panama, Colombia, Ecuador, Peru, Bolivia and Argentina (2008: 34,000 km); Tierra del Fuego to New York (2012: 40,000 km); India (2013: 16,000 km)	over 80,000 km (50,000 mi)	Solo and unsupported	Several non-continuous rides; octogenarian on latest ride. Books: Old Man on a Bike and Old Men Can't Wait
Kanichi Fujiwara (Japan, b. 1961)	April 2009–November 2013	50 cc Honda Super Cub	Numbered highways of Japan	100,000 km (62,000 mi)		Several non-continuous rides
Paul Pelland (USA, b.1968)	2012-	Yamaha Super Ténéré	Documenting one million miles raising awareness for multiple sclerosis (MS)	1,000,000 mi (1,600,000 km) (projected)	Solo and unsupported	Rider, writer and speaker with MS on one million mile journey Chasing the Cure
Danell Lynn (USA)	2014-2015	Triumph Bonneville	Lower 48 U.S. states non-overlapping route	48,600 mi (78,200 km)	Solo	Guinness World Record: Longest journey by motorcycle in a single country.
Carl Reese (U.S.)	2015	BMW K1600	Los Angeles, California–New York, New York	2,829 mi (4,553 km)	Solo with 12 "safety support" teams	Guinness record time 38 hours, 49 minutes. In 2017, set 24-hour riding distance record.
Kane Avellano (UK, b. 1993)	2016-2017	Triumph Bonneville	Circumnavigation UK, France, Germany, Austria, Italy, Slovenia, Croatia, Serbia, Bulgaria, Turkey, Georgia, Armenia, Iran, Pakistan, India, Myanmar, Thailand, Malaysia, Australia, Canada, US, Mexico, Guatemala, El Salvador, Honduras, Nicaragua, Costa Rica, Panama, Columbia, Ecuador, Peru, Chile, Argentina, Spain, Morocco (36 countries). Return to the UK via Spain and France.	28,000 mi (45,062 km)	Solo and unsupported	Guinness World Record: Youngest person to circumnavigate the globe by motorcycle (male).
Ewan McGregor (UK, b. 1971), Charley Boorman (UK, b. 1966)	September–December 2019	Prototype Harley-Davidson LiveWire	Hemispherical. Argentina, Chile, Bolivia, Peru, Ecuador, Colombia, Panama, Costa Rica, Nicaragua, Honduras, Guatemala, Mexico, US (13 countries)	13,000 mi (20,921 km)	Truck and crew	Documentary TV series: Long Way Up
Michel v. Tell (Switzerland)	2020–	2020 Harley-Davidson LiveWire	March 2020: 1723 km in 24 hours – over 400 km more than old e-bike record. Driven on normal street by just one person. Regular bike, regular recharge stations.	c. 1,723 km (1,071 mi)		Mileage all accomplished on a single motorcycle and a single driver. Switzerland, Liechtenstein, Germany, Austria.
Carol and Ken Duval (Queensland, Australia)	1997–	1981 BMW R80G/S	Two circumnavigations, starting in March 1997	c. 1,000,000 km (620,000 mi)		Mileage all accomplished on a single motorcycle
Jess Stone (Canadian)	2021–	BMW G650GS	Americas in 2022, Europe and Africa planned			With dog companion riding pillion
