= List of adventure motorcycling books =

This is a list of books about adventure motorcycling.

Title	Author	Year of publication	Year of journey
Across America by Motor-Cycle	C.K. Shepherd	1922	1919
One Man Caravan	Robert Edison Fulton Jr.	1937	1932-1933
Around the World on a Motorcycle: 1928 to 1936	Zoltán Sulkowsky, Gyula Bartha	1937	1928-1936
A Ride In The Sun	Peggy Iris Thomas	1954	1950-1952
Zen and the Art of Motorcycle Maintenance	Robert M. Pirsig	1974	Fictionalized
Jupiter's Travels	Ted Simon	1979	1973-1977
Two Wheels To Adventure: Alaska to Argentina by Motorcycle	Danny Liska	1989	
Investment Biker: On the Road With Jim Rogers	Jim Rogers	1994	1990-1992
Desert Travels	Chris Scott	1996	
10 Years on 2 Wheels	Helge Pedersen	1998	1982-1992
The Long Journey Home	Robert Edison Fulton Jr.	2000	1932-1933
Adventure Motorcycling Handbook	Chris Scott	2000	
Ghost Rider: Travels on the Healing Road	Neil Peart	2002	1998
Two Wheels Through Terror: Diary of a South American Motorcycle Odyssey	Glen Heggstad	2004	2001
Long Way Round	Ewan McGregor, Charley Boorman	2004	2004
Into Africa: Africa by Motorcycle - Every Day an Adventure	Sam Manicom	2005	1992-2000
Mondo Enduro	Austin Vince, Louis Bloom, et al.	2006	1995-1996
Riding With Rilke: Reflections on Motorcycles And Books	Ted Bishop	2006	
The Longest Ride: My Ten Year, 500,000 Mile Motorcycle Journey	Emilio Scotto	2007	1985-1995
Dreaming Of Jupiter	Ted Simon	2007	2001-2004
Under Asian Skies: Eye Opening Motorcycle Adventure Through the Cultures and Colours of Asia	Sam Manicom	2007	1992-2000
Long Way Down	Ewan McGregor, Charley Boorman	2007	2007
Distant Suns: Adventure in the Vastness of Africa and South America	Sam Manicom	2008	1992-2000
Endless Horizon: A Very Messy Motorcycle Journey Around the World	Dan Walsh	2009	2005
The Hunt for Puerto del Faglioli: A Motorcycle Adventure in Search of the Improbable	Paddy Tyson	2009	2008
One More Day Everywhere: Crossing 50 Borders on the Road to Global Understanding	Glen Heggstad	2009	
The University of Gravel Roads: Global Lessons from a Four-Year Motorcycle Adventure	Rene Cormier	2010	2003-2008
Borderlands: Riding the Edge of America	Derek Lundy	2010	
Tortillas to Totems: Motorcycling Mexico, the US and Canada. Sidetracked by the Unexpected	Sam Manicom	2010	1992-2000
Bearback: The World Overland	Pat Garrod	2010	
Old Men Can't Wait: A Septuagenarian Odyssey Through the Americas	Simon Gandolfi	2011	2007–2008
Far and Away: A Prize Every Time	Neil Peart	2011	
The Man Who Would Stop at Nothing: Long-Distance Motorcycling's Endless Road	Melissa Holbroo Pierson	2011	
Going Postal: The Ups and Downs of Travelling the World on a Postie Bike	Nathan Millward	2011	2009
In Search of Greener Grass	Graham Field	2012	
Motorcycle Therapy: A Canadian Adventure in Central America	Jeremy Kroeker	2012	
Red Tape and White Knuckles: One Woman's Adventure Through Africa	Lois Pryce	2013	2006
Desert Snow - One Girl's Take on Africa by Bike	Helen Lloyd	2013	
Through Dust and Darkness: A Motorcycle Journey of Fear and Faith in the Middle East	Jeremy Kroeker	2013	2007
Chaos In Harmony: A Motorcycle Journey Through Latin America	Alison Delapp	2014	
Empire Road - Lake Victoria by Motorcycle	Alan Whelan	2015	
Central America Border Crossing Guide	rtwPaul	2015	
Motorcycle Messengers: Tales from the Road by Writers who Ride.	Jeremy Kroeker (editor)	2015	
From Estonia With Love	Kariina Tšursin-Sootla, Margus Sootla	2015	2008
Overland to Vietnam: An 11,500 Mile Adventure on a 74-Year-Old Classic Motorcycle	Gordon May	2017	
The Butterfly Route	Michelle Lamphere	2017	
Land of the Dawn-lit Mountains	Antonia Bolingbroke-Kent	2017	2016
Lone Rider: The First British Woman to Ride a Motorcycle Around the World	Elspeth Beard	2017	1982-1984
Notes from the Road VOL.III	Derek Mansfield	2017	
Riding By The Seat Of My Pants: A Solo Motorcycle Journey From Alaska To Argentina	Brian Gibbons	2018	2010-2011
Rice & Dirt: Across Africa on a Vespa	Alexandra Fefopoulou, Stergios Gogos	2018	
Two Fingers On The Jugular: A motorcycle journey across Russia	Lawrence Bransby	2019	
TALES FROM SOUTH AMERICA: EVERYDAY LIFE, LEGENDS, & PEOPLE	Eglė Gerulaitytė	2019	
The Unseen Walls: Overland solo across Africa on a motorbike	Christian Brix	2019	2016-2017?
Home By Seven: One woman's solo journey to ride all seven continents on two wheels	Steph Jeavons	2020	2014-2018
2Up and Overloaded: Chicago to Panama	Tim Notier	2020	2017
Near Varna: When you've found your greener grass - Pt. 1	Graham Field	2020	
The Amazing Adventures of Dorothy	Nathan Millward	2020	
Jeff and Alan's Guide To Motorcycle Travel In Colombia	Jeffrey Cremer, Alan Churchill	2021	
Against The Wind: A Motorcycle Ride	Dale Arenson	2021	
Ureka: Finding the line between desire and contentment. Then riding it.	Graham Field	2022	
The Moment Collectors: Twenty Travellers’ Tales from Around the World	Sam Manicom and Friends	2022	Collection
Travels with a Restless Recluse: A Motorcycle Journey through Europe.	Christopher Gordon	2025	2022
