= Long Distance Riding =

Long distance riding might refer to:

Long-distance horse riding
Long-distance motorcycle riding
