= Sjaak Lucassen =

Dutch long-distance motorcycle rider

- Born: October 2, 1961 (age 64); Maashees, The Netherlands
- Known for: Long-distance motorcycle riding
- Website: www.sjaaklucassen.nl

Sjaak Lucassen (born October 2, 1961) is a Dutch long-distance motorcycle rider.

== Travels ==
Between 1995 and 1998 he traveled 160,000 kilometres (99,000 mi) on a Honda Fireblade and then between 2001 and 2006 he traveled 250,000 kilometres (160,000 mi) around the world on a Yamaha YZF-R1, nicknamed Florentina. One journalist deemed the Yamaha sportbike to be "by its nature" inappropriate for the journey's demands of "off-road traveling, desert and deep water crossing". His solo travels of the 2000s are documented in the film Sjaak the World and the book Life on 2 wheels written by Lucassen. A 16,000-kilometre (9,900 mi) trip from Florida to Alaska with German long-distance rider Doris Wiedemann beginning January 2009 was documented in her 2010 book, Winter Ride to Alaska: By Motorcycle from Florida to the Shore of the Arctic Ocean. In March–April 2013, Lucassen rode from Barrow, Alaska to Key West, Florida, starting with traversal over sea ice and frozen tundra from Barrow to Nuiqsut, towing a sledge part way.

In a 2012 interview for the Royal Dutch Touring Club, Lucassen reckoned he had spent ten years of his life journeying in the saddle of a motorcycle.

Around 2015, Sjaak announced he planned to make another harrowing trip on a Yamaha YZF-R1, this time a custom-built version, nicknamed aRctic1. He planned to ride his R1 to the North Pole, starting from Anchorage, Alaska. Currently he is in the process of building his custom R1, including air suspension, by which he can raise and lower the bike some 10 inches, a 330mm front tyre from Avon and an even wider fully custom made rear tyre. Also the aRctic1 carries an onboard compressor for inflating and deflating the tyres.

== Documentation ==
=== Books and film ===
- Lucassen, Sjaak (2010). Leven op 2 wielen [Life on 2 wheels] (in Dutch). ISBN 9789491153013.
- Lucassen, Sjaak; Brown, Andy (Translator) (October 15, 2013). Thiesen-Lucassen, Gardie (ed.). Life on 2 wheels (Part 1 out of 3, Europe and Africa) (Kindle ed.). ASIN B00FXQB6WW.
- Brandon Green, Director/Director of Photography, Editor, Writer; Sjaak Lucassen, Executive Producer, Camera (2010). Sjaak the World (DVD) (Motion picture). Kansas City, Kansas: Evergreen Images. – Nominated best documentary feature at Black Hills film festival 2011

=== Speaking ===
Lucassen was an invited speaker at the German Globetrotter Club's 2009 and 2013 Globetrottertreffen rallies in Austria.
