= Single-cylinder engine =

Piston engine with one cylinder

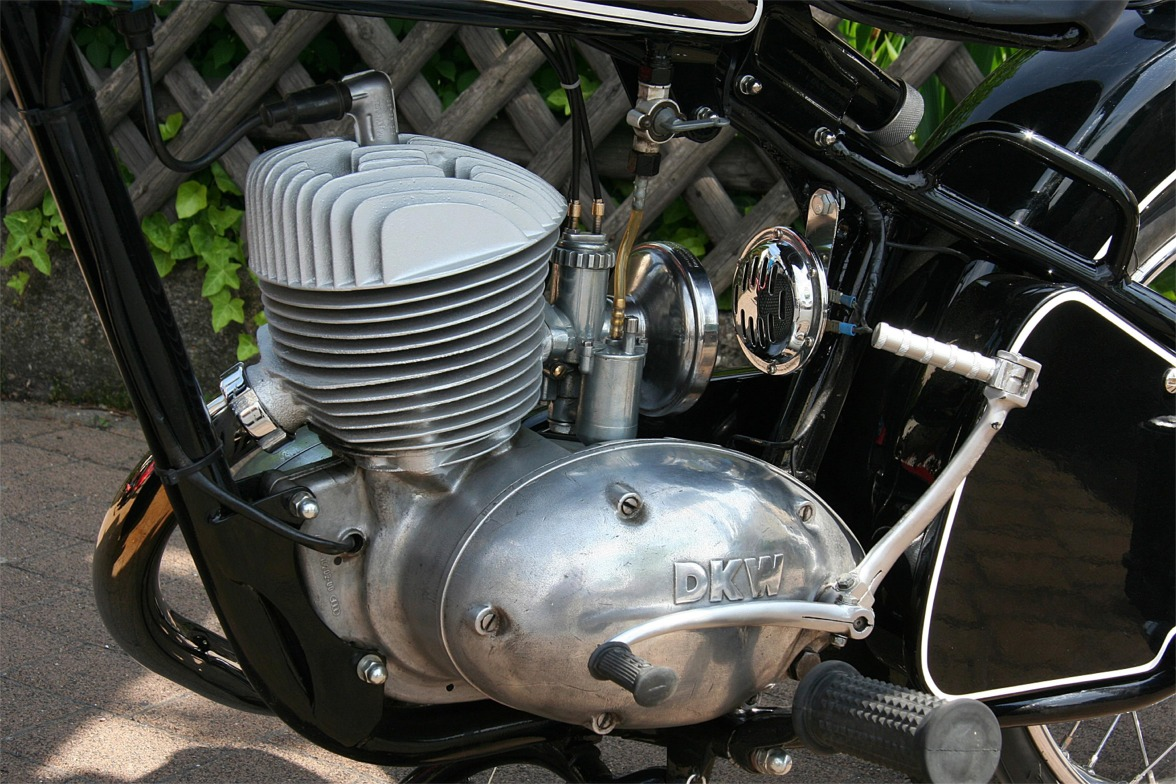
DKW RT 250 (1952–1953) motorcycle engine

A single-cylinder engine, sometimes called a thumper, is a piston engine with one cylinder. This engine is often used for motorcycles, motor scooters, motorized bicycles, go-karts, all-terrain vehicles, radio-controlled vehicles, power tools and garden machinery (such as chainsaws, lawn mowers, cultivators, and string trimmers). Single-cylinder engines are made both as 4-strokes and 2-strokes.

== Characteristics ==
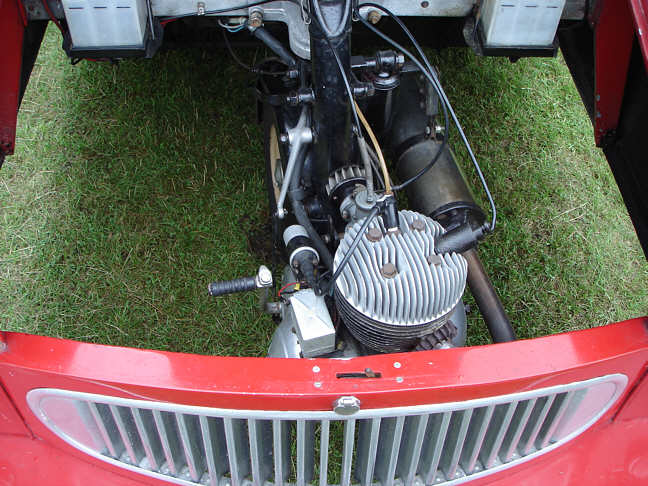
Villiers engine in a 1959 Bond Minicar

Compared with multi-cylinder engines, single-cylinder engines are usually simpler and compact. Due to the greater potential for airflow around all sides of the cylinder, air cooling is often more effective for single cylinder engines than multi-cylinder engines. This reduces the weight and complexity of air-cooled single-cylinder engines, compared with liquid-cooled engines.

Drawbacks of single-cylinder engines include a more pulsating power delivery through each cycle and higher levels of vibration. The uneven power delivery means that often a single-cylinder engine requires a heavier flywheel than a comparable multi-cylinder engine, resulting in relatively slower changes in engine speed. To reduce the vibration level, they often make greater use of balance shafts than multi-cylinder engines, as well as more extreme methods such as a dummy connecting rod (for example the Ducati Supermono). These balancing devices can reduce the benefits of single-cylinder engines regarding lower weight and complexity.

Most single-cylinder engines used in motor vehicles are fueled by petrol (and use a four-stroke cycle), however diesel single-cylinder engines are also used in stationary applications (such as the Lombardini 3LD and 15LD).

A variation known as the split-single makes use of two pistons which share a single combustion chamber.

== Uses ==
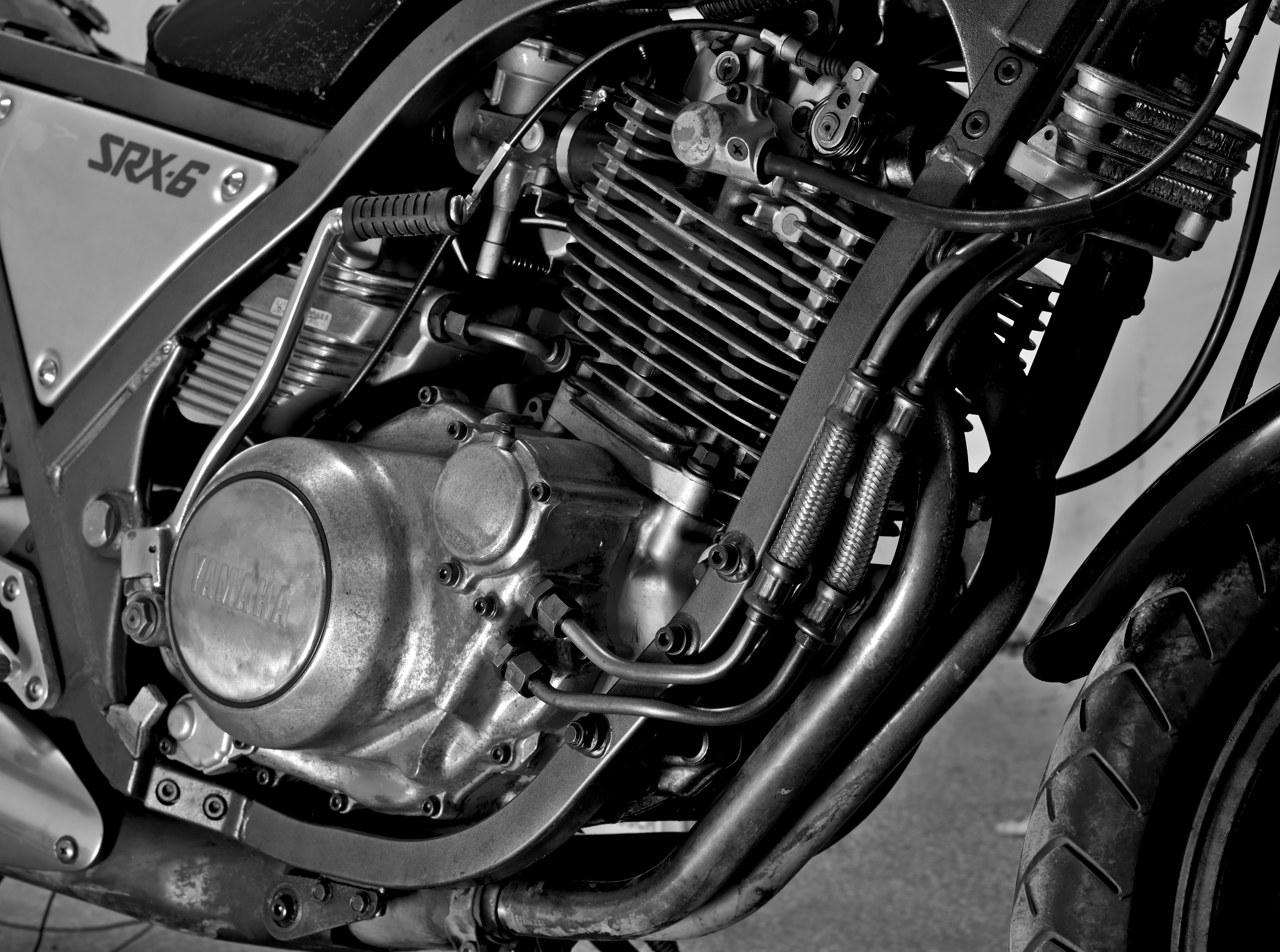
Yamaha SRX600 (1985–1997) motorcycle engine

Early motorcycles, automobiles and other applications such as marine engines all tended to be single-cylinder. The configuration is almost exclusively used in portable tools, along with garden machinery such as lawnmowers. Single-cylinder engines also remain in widespread use in motorcycles, motor scooters, go-karts, auto rickshaws, and radio-controlled models. From 1921 to 1960, the Lanz Bulldog tractor used a large horizontally mounted single-cylinder two-stroke engine. However, they are rarely used in modern automobiles and tractors, due to developments in engine technology.

Single-cylinder engines remain the most common engine layout in motor scooters and low-powered motorcycles. The Honda Super Cub (the motor vehicle with the highest overall sales since its introduction in 1958) uses a 49 cc (3.0 cu in) four-stroke single-cylinder engine. There are also several single-cylinder sportbikes (such as the KTM 690 Duke R), dual-sport motorcycles (such as the BMW G650GS) and the classic-styled Royal Enfield 500 Bullet.

The Moto3 class in the MotoGP World Championship have used four-stroke 250 cc (15.3 cu in) single-cylinder engines since the class replaced 125 cc (7.6 cu in) two-strokes in 2012.

== Other single-cylinder engines ==
Engines of other sorts, like the beam engine and certain types of Stirling engine, operate using one cylinder and thus can also be considered single-cylinder engines.
