= Jess Stone (motorcyclist) =

Jess Stone (born 1984 or 1985 (age 40–41), Canada) is a Canadian long-distance motorcycle rider. The ride was publicized in 2021, and began in March 2022. As of February 2023, she was traveling around the world with her dog Moxie, a German Shepherd, and had covered the continents of North and South America, and planned to continue on to Africa and Europe. The motorcycle used on the journey, a BMW G650GS, has a dog carrier in the pillion position, which she designed and sells through a company co-owned with her husband. The dog wears hot pink goggles.
