= Pelland =

Pelland may refer to:

- Pelland Engineering, British kit car manufacturing company
- Pelland, Minnesota, unincorporated community

== People with the surname ==
- Paul Pelland, long-distance motorcyclist
