= Rataj =

Rataj (Czech/Slovak feminine: Ratajová) is a surname meaning "ploughman" or "farmer" in various Slavic languages. Alternative spellings include Ratai, Ratay, Rattai, Rattaj, Rattay.

== People ==
=== Rataj ===
- Igor Rataj (born 1973), Slovak ice hockey player
- Lucie Ratajová (born 1979), Czech football referee
- Maciej Rataj (1884–1940), Polish politician and writer
- Mojca Rataj (born 1979), Bosnian alpine skier
- Tomáš Rataj (born 2003), Czech footballer

=== Variations ===
- Chris and Erin Ratay, American long-distance motorcyclists
- George Rattai (born 1943), Canadian biathlete
- Tim Rattay (born 1977), American football coach

== See also ==
- 21724 Ratai, a minor planet
