= Kevin Sanders =

Kevin Sanders may refer to:

- Kevin Sanders (motorcyclist) (born 1964), British world record holder for circumnavigation
- Kevin Sanders (musician) (born 1982), member of the Georgia band Cartel
