= Carol and Ken Duval =

Australian long-distance motorcyclists

Carol and Ken Duval are Australian long-distance motorcyclists. They started long-distance riding outside of Oceania in March 1997, completing a circumnavigation of the Earth in June 2001, having touched 57 countries and covered 200,000 kilometers. In 2007 Ken Duval retired, the couple sold their belongings in Brisbane, Australia to raise $500,000 for traveling, and they started on a new journey. By 2017, after eight years on the road, they had finished a second circumnavigation and had racked up nearly one million kilometers; both trips were on the same motorcycle, a 1981 BMW R80G/S.
