= Cathy Birchall =

Long-distance motorcycle rider

- Born: 1956 or 1957; 1957 or 1958
- Died: 31 January 2013
- Known for: Long-distance motorcycling

Cathy Birchall (c. 1957–2013) was a long-distance motorcyclist credited as the first blind woman to circumnavigate the world.

Her circumnavigation on a 1990 BMW R100RT motorcycle was accomplished in one year, beginning in August 2008. She was riding pillion with her partner Bernard Smith. While on this journey she also became the first blind person to reach the summit of Wayna Picchu. Birchall has been completely blind since her late twenties due to retinitis pigmentosa and was in her fifties during the trip. Birchall and her partner both kept journals during the trip and eventually wrote a book about their journey titled Touching The World: A Blind Woman, Two Wheels and 25,000 Miles. The trip actually covered 26,385 miles, as well as thirty-one countries and five continents. They were married on 20 August 2012 after Cathy was diagnosed with terminal cancer. Unknown to them, it turned out to be the same day their story was published after the publisher decided to bring the publication date forward.

Birchall and her husband are originally from Warrington, Cheshire, which is in England.

Birchall died of cancer on 31 January 2013.

== Bibliography ==
- Birchall, Cathy; Smith, Bernard (2012), Touching The World: A Blind Woman Two Wheels 25,000 Miles, Panther Publishing, ISBN 978-0956497581
