= John Paul Gerber =

American motorcycle rider

John Paul Gerber (February 12, 1945 – June 12, 2010) was an American author, historian, librarian, and sportsperson.

== Personal life ==
Gerber was born in Sioux Falls, South Dakota, the eldest of 5 children born to John and Millie Gerber. As a youth his family moved to in Stillwater, Oklahoma, then during his teens in Menomonie, Wisconsin. Gerber earned a B.A. in history from the University of Minnesota, a PhD in history from the University of Wisconsin, and an MLS from Simmons College. He spent much of his professional career as an archivist at Harvard Law School and a medical librarian for the Boston Healthcare System.

== Scootering ==
Gerber had a passion for European motorscooters, such as Vespas, Lambretta, and Heinkels, owning dozens of various scooters, putting over 412,000 miles riding his bikes on 5 continents, and according to the Boston Globe was "the world's foremost historian on the development, manufacture and spread of motor scooters as a practical means of everyday and leisure transportation."

Gerber rode his first bike at age 14 and by 21 he had ridden almost 40,000 miles traveling around the US and Canada. In 1966 he embarked on the first of his epic rides going 11,000 mi (18,000 km) from Minnesota to Panama and back on a Vespa GS 160. In 1971, he completed a 25,000 mi (40,000 km) solo trip on his Vespa motor scooter from Wisconsin down the east coast of South America to the Tierra del Fuego. He returned up the west coast and was on his way to Alaska when the trip was cut short by a car totaling his scooter in Hayward, California. In the late 1970s Gerber shipped a Vespa Rally from London to Singapore so he could ride the bike back the 20,000 mi (32,000 km) to London.

== Death ==
Gerber died on June 10, 2010, in Quincy, Massachusetts, aged 65, from pancreatic cancer.

== Books ==
- John Paul Gerber. Pannekoek and the socialism of workers' self-emancipation, 1873-1960, Springer, New York, 1989. 250 pages OCLC 9780792302742
- John Paul Gerber. Militants against the apparatus: the Communist opposition in France, 1923-1932, University of Wisconsin, Madison 1973. 412 pages

== Articles ==
- An American Story by John Gerber, Veteran Vespa Club Journal, Winter 2004/5
- Weird and Wonderful No. 1: The AMI by John Gerber, Veteran Vespa Club Journal, Autumn 2006
- Weird and Wonderful No. 2: The Harley Davidson Brezza by John Gerber, Veteran Vespa Club Journal, Winter 2006/7
- Weird and Wonderful: The NSU Maxima by John Gerber, Veteran Vespa Club Journal, Spring 2007
- Weird and Wonderful: The Csepel Tunde by John Gerber, Veteran Vespa Club Journal, Summer 2007
- Larry Hagman: Greenwich Village Bohemian and Vespa enthusiast by John Gerber, Veteran Vespa Club Journal, Summer 2009
- Weird and Wonderful: The Swiss Army Vespa by John Gerber, Veteran Vespa Club Journal, Autumn 2009
- The sorry tale of the demise of the Hoffmann Vespa by John Gerber, Veteran Vespa Club Journal, Winter 2010/11
- Hans Stuck and Vespa by John Gerber, Veteran Vespa Club Journal, Spring 2011
