= Pat Garrod =

British physician and long distance motorcyclist

- Born: 1964 (age 61–62); Chelmsford
- Education: University of Southampton
- Occupation: Physician
- Known for: Long-distance motorcycling

Pat Garrod (b. Chelmsford 1964) is a British physician and long distance motorcyclist. He and his wife Vanessa Lewis undertook a 100,000-mile (160,000 km) round-the-world ride on a 1991 BMW R100GS, between 1998 and October, 2002.

His 2010 book Bearback — The World Overland describing the 4-year journey was called as a "damned good story" by Overland magazine, and evidence of improving quality in self-published overland adventure books.

After the circumnavigation, Garrod and Lewis crossed Africa twice more by motorcycle. One north-to-south traversal in 2006 was more than 20,000 kilometres (12,000 mi) long; Garrod's travel log records a total of over 65,000 miles (105,000 km) in Africa alone.

== Bibliography ==
- Garrod, Pat (2010), Bearback — The World Overland, Troubador Press, ISBN 9781848765146
