= Bharadwaj Dayala =

Indian motorcycle rider

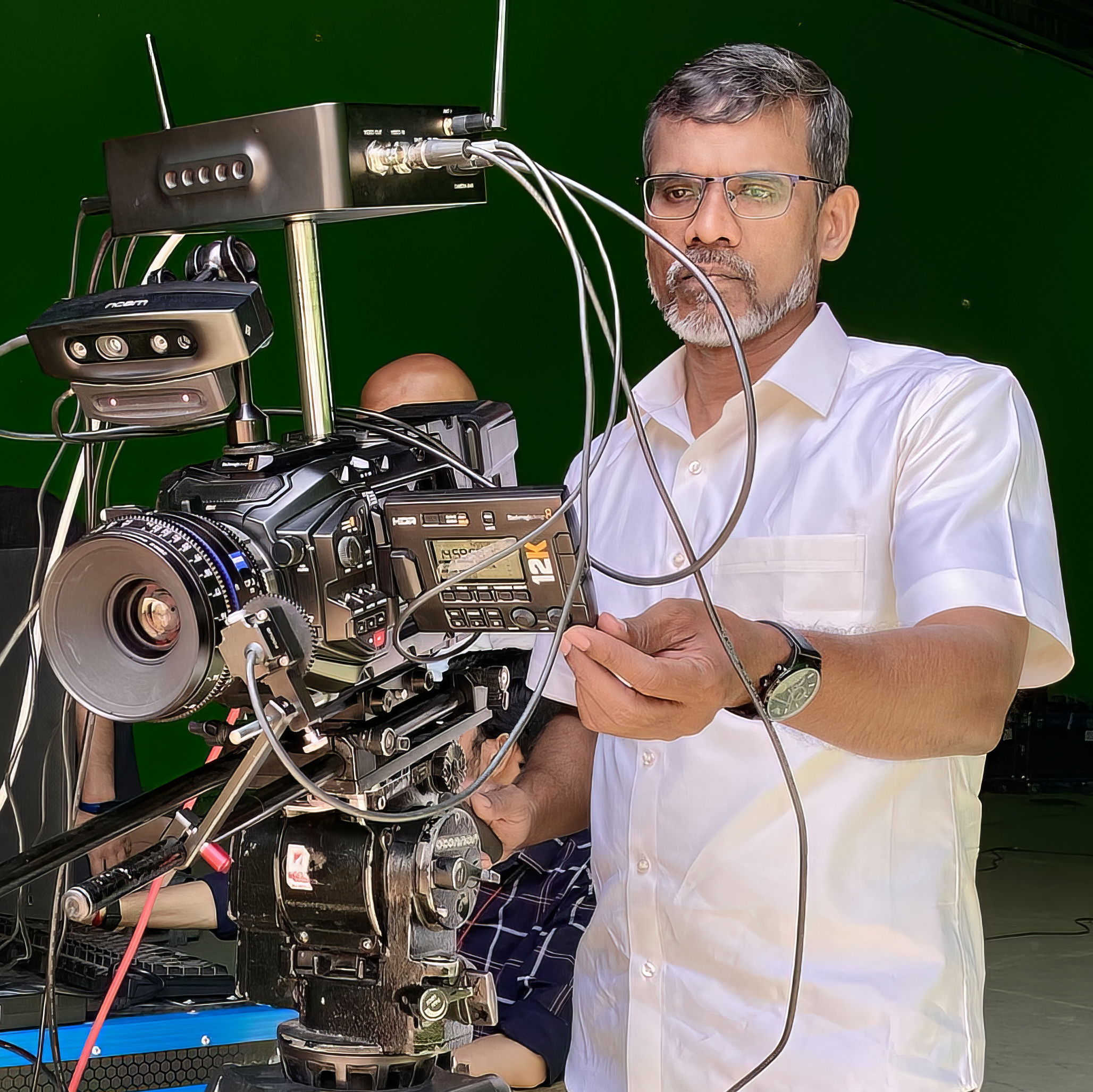
- Bharadwaj Dayala
- Born: 31 May 1970 (age 56); Visakhapatnam, Andhra Pradesh, India
- Other name: World Rider
- Occupations: Photographer, Filmmaker, Motorcyclist, Author
- Years active: 2006–present
- Website: www.bharadwajdayala.com

Bharadwaj Dayala (born 1970) is an Indian long-distance motorcyclist. He completed a solo circumnavigation of the world on a motorcycle between 2006 and 2007, which has been described as the first such journey by an Indian rider.

== Career ==
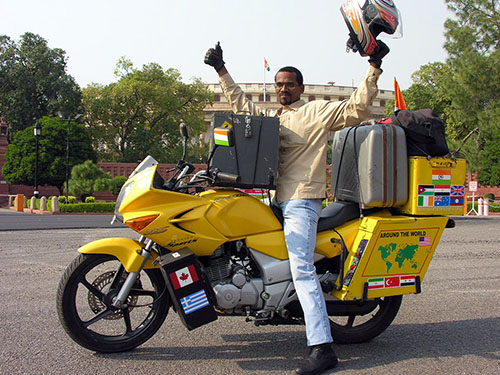
Dayala poses after returning to India from his successful world tour

Dayala started his solo world tour on a motorcycle from Visakhapatnam, Andhra Pradesh, India, on April 2, 2006. He rode to Chennai, Tirupati, Hyderabad, and Pune. After arriving in Mumbai, his last city in India, he rode to Tehran, Iran. From Tehran, he started riding on international roads, traveling through Iran, Turkey, Syria, Jordan, Egypt, Greece, Italy, France, the United Kingdom, Canada, the US, Australia, Indonesia, and Bangladesh. After traversing 5 continents, 14 countries, and 47,000 kilometers in 18 months, he returned home on October 2, 2007.

== Awards ==
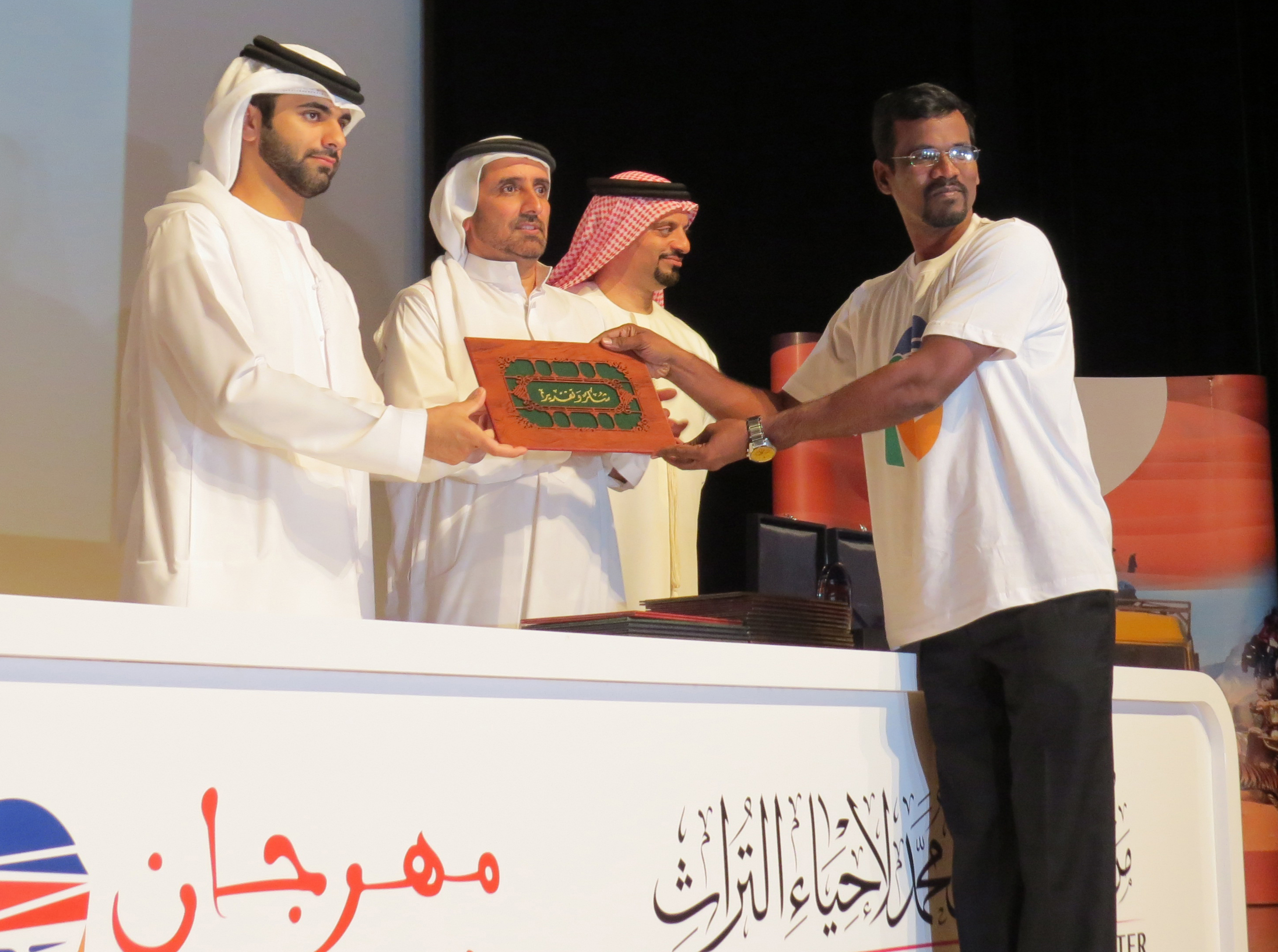
Prince of Dubai congratulating Bharadwaj

On December 4, 2013, Dayala was congratulated by Prince of Dubai Mohammed bin Rashid Al Maktoum for his achievement in global travel.

On November 23, 2018, Dayala was awarded the Best Globe Trotter Award by China at the China Global Travelers Festival held in Shanghai.

== Social activities ==
=== All India Road Safety Ride ===
In 2004, Dayala participated in a road safety awareness ride across India, supported by then Deputy Prime Minister of India, L.K. Avani.

=== Vande Mataram ===
On March 15, 2014, Dayala joined Vande Mataram, a non-government organization, in a cross-country ride across India to support youth participation in the 2014 Indian general election.

=== Million Amazing Women ===
On January 10, 2025, Dayala embarked on an expedition to capture a million portraits of women from around the world.
