= Danell Lynn =

American long distance motorcycle rider

Danell Lynn is an American long distance motorcycle rider. As of 2016, she holds the Guinness record for the world's longest motorcycle journey in a single country. She is the first woman to earn the record riding solo.

== Riding ==
Lynn's parents rode while she was in utero. Around 2000, Lynn began riding pillion (i.e. as a passenger). About six years prior to her record-breaking trip, she decided she wanted to be in control. Although her desired ride was a Triumph Bonneville, she heeded the advice of family to begin with a starter bike as new riders inevitably drop (tip over and damage) their first bike. She purchased a 1982 Virago for $1200 and learned her riding and mechanical skills on it. She later purchased the Triumph, which she named Amelia.

Prior to the US tour, Lynn had ridden as a passenger in Chile and Argentina. As a driver, she completed trips in Costa Rica, Cuba, Arizona, California, Utah and Colorado.

=== Record-breaking trip ===
Lynn saved for two years, sold possessions, and received sponsorship from Giant Loop, a motorcycle luggage supplier. She left on Sep 19, 2014, tracking her progress with a SPOT Tracker to meet the verification requirements of Guinness world records. Over the next year, she traveled over 53,000 miles in all US states and three Canadian provinces; only the 48,600 miles (78,214 km) in the 48 contiguous United States counted towards the record. She completed the trip August 29, 2015.

Lynn stated she thought it would be a "grand statement" for a woman to make the journey, but she was told a woman-specific category would not be added. She then decided to break the existing record for the longest trip in a single country.

== Personal life ==
The daughter of an Air Force service member, Lynn lived in Europe with two siblings as a child. Lynn graduated from Cooper High School in Abilene, Texas in 2000. A frequent traveler, by the age of 19 she had visited every US state. Lynn also works as a custom fashion designer; in 2009 she designed the first NFL authorized ball-gown out of recycled Arizona Cardinals jerseys for sale at a charity auction.

== Awards ==
Lynn has been awarded four Iron Butt awards and an American Motorcycle Association Long Rider award.
