= Zoltán Sulkowsky and Gyula Bartha =

Long-distance motorcycle riders and authors

Zoltán Sulkowsky and Gyula Bartha (born c. 1904–1905) were Hungarian long-distance motorcycle riders who traveled over 170,000 kilometers (110,000 mi) on a Harley-Davidson sidecar rig between 1928 and 1936. Their travels are recounted in a book originally published in Hungarian in 1937, and reissued in an English translation in 2008.

Their journey started in Hungary in August, 1928, and ended again in Hungary. Along the way they visited sixty-eight countries and regions on six continents, including: France, Germany, Spain, Czechoslovakia, Portugal, Italy, Algeria, Tunisia, Libya, Egypt, Palestine, Syria, Turkey, Bulgaria, Romania, Yugoslavia, the Sudan, India, the Arabian peninsula, French Indochina, Siam, the Malay Peninsula, Japan, China, Hawaii, and Australia; then after landing in America at San Francisco, they spent two years touring North America then another two years in South America, visiting Mexico, Cuba, Panama, Ecuador, Peru, Chile, Argentina, Uruguay and Brazil.

== Bibliography ==
- Sulkowsky, Zoltán (2001) [First published 1937], Motorral a Föld körül (in Hungarian), Zeusz, Viágjárók, ISBN 963-00-6862-1
- Sulkowsky, Zoltán (2008), Around the World on a Motorcycle: 1928 To 1936, translated by Noémi M. Najbauer, Whitehorse Press, ISBN 9781884313776
