= Kevin and Julia Sanders =

English motorcyclist husband and wife

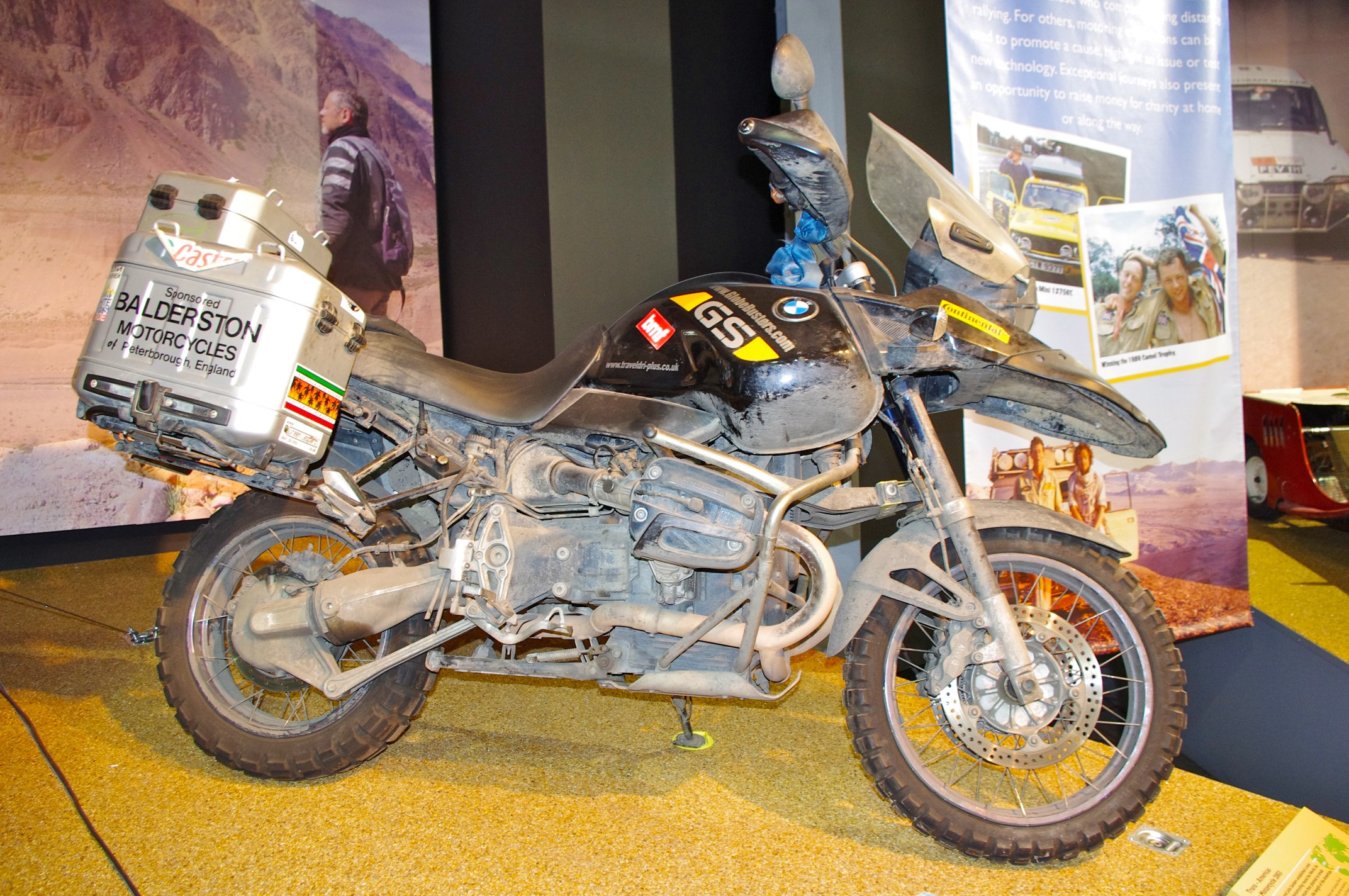
The Sanders' BMW R1150GS on display at the Motor Museum, Beaulieu

Kevin Sanders and Julia Sanders (née Powell) are an English motorcyclist husband and wife noted for overland long-distance riding. They hold two Guinness World Records. The first was achieved in June 2002 by circumnavigating the world by motorcycle in 19½ days. The second was completed on 22 September 2003, riding the length of the Americas from Deadhorse, Prudhoe Bay in Alaska, United States to Ushuaia, Tierra del Fuego, Argentina in 35 days and breaking the previous record by over 12 days. After these Guinness World records, they founded their motorcycle expedition company, GlobeBusters Motorcycle Expeditions in 2004.

== Biography ==
Kevin was born in London in 1964, and grew up in Tottenham. He has ridden motorcycles since he was 17. He moved to Cambridge and started his own motorcycle training school, "BikeSafe". He holds the highest qualifications for advanced motorcycling available to civilians, the RoSPA Diploma in Advanced Motorcycle Tuition.

Julia Powell was born in Sheffield in 1966. Sanders met Julia when travelling in South America in 1997. They got married in Cusco, Peru in 2001. Since then they have broken two motorcycle world records, started their own motorcycle expedition company, GlobeBusters, been featured in many magazines, made their own motorcycle travel DVDs and have been featured on National Geographic Channel.

== Guinness World Records rides ==
=== 2002 World Circumnavigation ===
In 2002, Kevin and Julia Sanders broke the Guinness World Record for the fastest circumnavigation of the world by motorcycle, taking 12½ days off the previous record established by Nick Sanders in June 1997. They averaged 1,000 miles (1,600 km) each day on the bike and rode 19,461 miles (31,319 km) in 19 days 8 hours and 25 minutes. The bike used was a BMW R1150GS. The ride took place between 11 May and 22 June 2002.

This motorcycle record also beat the existing car record for Around the World by 1 hour and 50 minutes, a record which allows two drivers to rotate the driving. Their Guinness World Record motorcycle ride now stands as the fastest overland vehicle around the world, although the Guinness World Records no longer recognises such attempts.

=== 2003 Trans Americas ===
The previous record for the Trans Americas route had stood at 47½ days. The Sanders broke this by over 12 days, doing it in 35 days. The ride started on 18 August 2003 and finished on 22 September 2003. The Trans Americas route covered almost 17,000 miles (27,000 km) of tough riding, rugged terrains and extreme weather conditions. They rode from Deadhorse, Prudhoe Bay in Alaska to Ushuaia, Tierra del Fuego, Argentina. The route went through Alaska, Canada, United States, Mexico, Guatemala, Honduras, Nicaragua, Costa Rica, Panama. The motorcycle was then airfreighted over the Darién Gap from Panama City to Caracas, Venezuela. They continued the ride through Venezuela, Colombia, Ecuador, Peru, Chile and Argentina. The motorcycle used was a BMW R1150GS Adventure.

Guinness World Records no longer certifies new attempts at this record, but the rules that were in force at the time of this Guinness World Record were: 1. Route must be checked by Guinness World Records prior to setting off. It must start at Prudhoe Bay, Alaska and finish in Ushuaia, Argentina. 2. It is permitted to fly over the Darién Gap, but the clock continues to run for the whole of the time. 3. In South America you must cross through Cartagena or Barranquilla in Colombia (to show you have ridden the full length of South America). 4. Same rider, same motorcycle throughout. 5. No traffic offences. 6. Maintain a detailed log book – for every stop, record location, date, time, mileage and when you start, record the date and time of starting. 7. Photographic and video evidence of journey. 8. Two witnesses each day to sign the log book. 9. Two independent witnesses of local standing to verify the whole evidence of the journey prior to submission to Guinness World Records.

== 2010 Silk Road East expedition ==
On 17 April 2010, Sanders led an 80-day expedition through Europe, Turkey, Georgia, Azerbaijan, Turkmenistan, Uzbekistan, Tajikistan, Kyrgyzstan, and China. The 13,000-mile (21,000 km) trip ended on 5 July 2010, with one rider repatriated due to altitude sickness en route to Everest Base Camp. A documentary about this trip was made in 2011, entitled "The Ride - London to Beijing". Featured on Amazon Prime

== Charity ==
Their rides have also raised money for SOS Children's Villages. With its UK base in Cambridge, their old home town, this charity cares for abandoned and orphaned children in over 122 countries worldwide. As part of their Trans Americas World Record, they visited the SOS Children's Village in Panama, whilst the bike was being air freighted to Caracas. Their total funds raised to date stand at almost £11,000 for the Trans Americas Guinness Ride. Sanders has also led other charity rides such as a 2006 Trans-Russia "White Nights" expedition to raise money for the Royal Marsden Hospital.

== National Geographic Channel ==
In 2007, National Geographic Channel broadcast a series, The Ride: Alaska to Patagonia, which documented the 2005 Trans Americas ride undertaken by Kevin & Julia Sanders and a team of eleven motorcyclists. This ride started on 31 July 2005 and finished on 11 December 2005, through Alaska, Canada, USA, Mexico, Guatemala, Honduras, Nicaragua, Costa Rica, Panama, Ecuador, Peru, Chile & Argentina, traversing the Pan American Highway.

== See also ==
- List of long-distance motorcycle riders
