= Chris and Erin Ratay =

American motorcycle riders

Chris Ratay and Erin Doherty-Ratay are American long-distance motorcyclists. Their 101,322-mile (163,062 km), four year circumnavigation of the Earth on BMW F650 and BMW R100PD motorcycles between May 1999 and August 2003 set a new Guinness World Record for distance ridden by a pair of motorcyclists on two motorcycles.

The couple have appeared on U.S. national live television on NBC News, and the 2012 documentary DVD Achievable Dream: The Motorcycle Adventure Guide. Erin Ratay is one of the subjects of the 2013 PBS documentary film Driven to Ride. Erin Ratay also was a speaker at the American Motorcyclist Association's 2009 Women & Motorcycling Conference in Keystone, Colorado.

== Notes and references ==
=== References ===
- Bizar, Jodi (August 3, 2003), "Cyclists motor for 4 years around the world — Couple spends four years touring the globe on motorcycles", The Free Lance–Star, Fredericksburg, Virginia
- "Janice Huffs Segs", NBC Universal archives, NBC News, August 8, 2003
- Beech, Mark (October 13, 2003), "Now, That's A Road Trip Stuck in a rut, Erin and Chris Ratay got on their motorcycles and took a four-year ride around the world", Sports Illustrated
- Lozano, Vanessa (November 9, 2004), "IN THE SPOTLIGHT — Career Services Fosters Professional Development", Faculty/Staff E-Newsletter, University of Colorado Career Services, archived from the original on March 4, 2016
- Schmitt, Genevieve (July 31, 2009), "New Update: Women & Motorcycling Conference", Women Riders Now, Solitude Ranch Communications
- Drevenstedt, Greg (July 25, 2012), "Horizon Unlimited Achievable Dream DVD Series Review", Rider, archived from the original on August 27, 2014
- Heckel, Aimee (November 16, 2013), "Boulder filmmaker explores why women ride motorcycles", Daily Camera, Boulder, Colorado
- O'Connor, Colleen (November 24, 2013), "New documentary: Women motorcycle riders a fast-growing trend", Denver Post
- Kailus, Julie (December 9, 2013), Women on motorcycles is a growing trend — The new documentary 'Driven to Ride' delves into women and their love for two wheels, GrindTV
- Ratay, Chris and Erin (c. 2014), "Motorcycles", Ultimate Journey website
