= Anne-France Dautheville =

French journalist, writer, traveller and motorcyclist

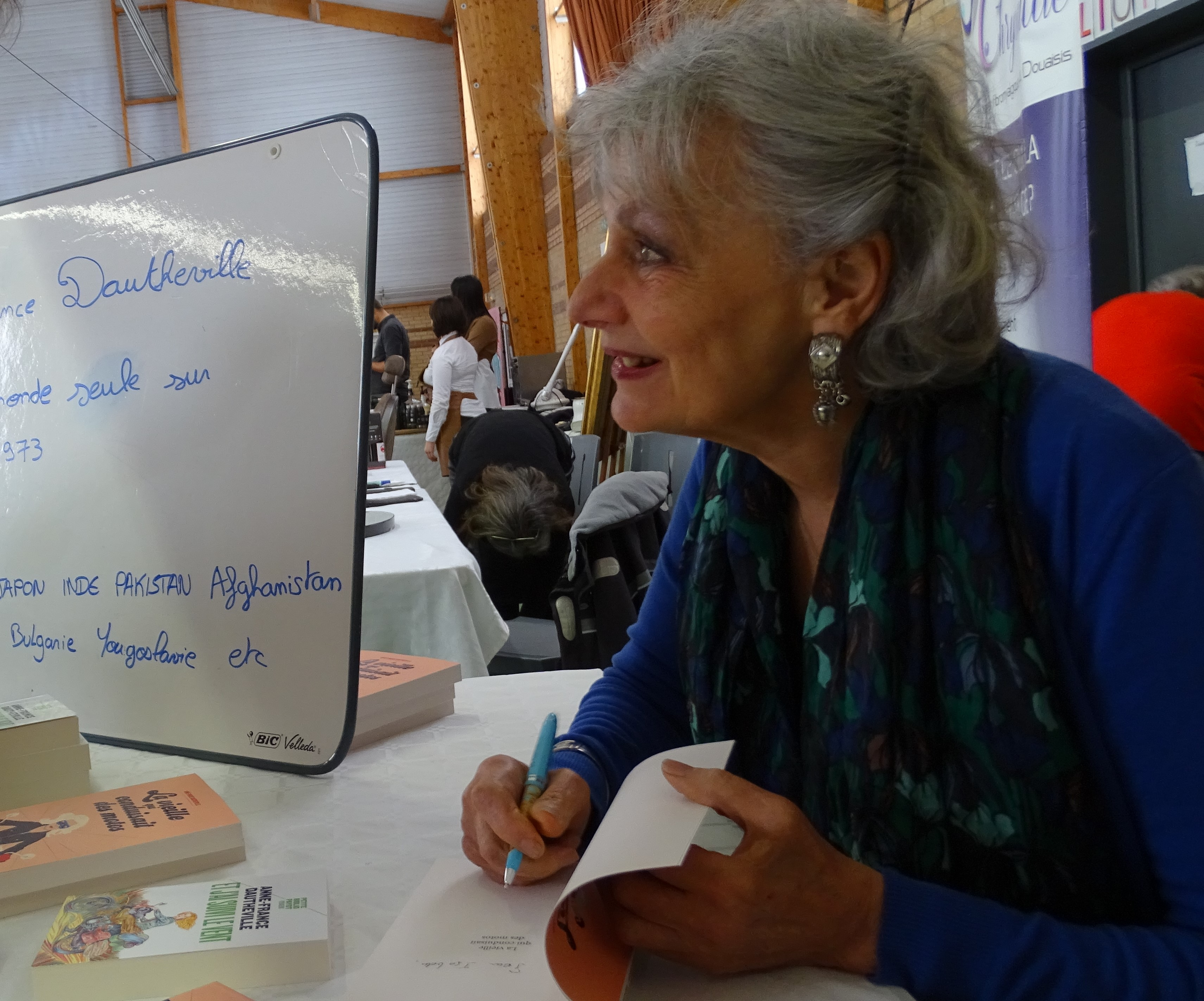
Anne-France Dautheville

Anne-France Dautheville (born March 22nd 1944) is a French journalist and writer, noted for being the first woman to motorcycle solo around the world.

== Motorcycle travels ==
Dautheville grew up in Paris. In 1972, she participated in the Orion-Raid motorcycle tour, riding solo on a Moto Guzzi 750 from France to Isfahan, Iran, and continuing on to Afghanistan. In 1973, she became the first woman to motorcycle solo around the world, covering 12,500 miles over three continents riding a Kawasaki 125. During this time, she was a freelance journalist, and she supported herself by writing about her travels. She continued her world travels until 1981.

=== Travelogues ===
Dautheville's books Une Demoiselle sur une Moto (Girl on a Motorcycle), published in 1973, and Et J'ai Suivi le Vent (And I Followed the Wind), published in 1975, document her travels.

== Fashion ==
French fashion house Chloé used Dautheville as the inspiration for its fall 2016 fashion show. Designer Clare Waight Keller said that she wanted to evoke Dautheville's "amazing sense of adventure, daring and courage but also the curiosity of travelling." Waight Keller explained: "She had a boyish cool attitude but she also took these amazing dresses with her which she threw her sweaters and biker jackets over. I wanted to bring that lived in quality to the collection."

== Published works ==
- Une demoiselle sur une moto. Flammarion. 1973.
- Et j'ai suivi le vent. Flammarion. 1975.
- L'histoire de Jeff Walcott. Belfond. 1978.
- La piste de l'or. Plon. 1982.
- Le voleur d'images. Plon. 1983.
- La ville sur l'eau. Plon. 1985.
- Les anges de sainte Catherine. Stock. 1987.
- Les variations Maraldi. Julliard. 1989.
- L'Africaine. Olivier Orban. 1990.
- Les chevaux du ciel. Le Rocher. 1992.
- Julie chevalier de Maupin. Lattès. 1995.
- Les très riches heures de Meslois sur le Sansonnet. Olympio. 2000.
- Le grand dictionnaire de mon petit jardin. Minerva. 2004.
- Dautheville, Anne-France; Gay, Pierre (2005). Les zoos pour quoi faire?. Delachaux et Niestlé.
- L'intelligence du jardinier. Arthaud. 2009.
- Le grand dictionnaire de mon petit jardin 2013. Belin.
- Les miscellanées des plantes. Buchet Chastel. 2016.
- Dautheville, Anne-France (2016). Impressions d'Avicenne. Kindle Direct Publishing.
- Et j'ai suivi le vent. Payot. 2018.
- Les Miscellanées de mon jardin. Buchet Castel. 2018.
- La vieille qui conduisait des motos. Payot. 2019.
- Harmonie. Alma. 2019.
- Miscellanées des fleurs. Tout sur les Fleurs et un peu plus encore. Buchet Chastel. 2020.
- L'Australie, c'est en bas à droite. Payot. 2021.
- Roule ma poule! Mes balades magiques à moto. Payot. 2024.
