= Helge Pedersen =

Long-distance motorcyclist

- Born: c. 1955
- Occupation: Founder of GlobeRiders tour guides
- Known for: Long-distance motorcycle riding
- Website: globeriders.com

Helge Pedersen (born c. 1955) is a long-distance motorcyclist originally from Kristiansand, Norway, who now resides in Seattle, Washington. He traveled more than 250,000 miles (400,000 km) touring the world on a BMW R80G/S adventure touring motorcycle between 1982 and 1992. This journey is recounted in his book 10 Years on 2 Wheels. The motorcycle he rode on was placed on display at the BMW Museum in Munich.

Pedersen has been "prominent in the motorcycle industry", continuing to ride and lead tours since 1993. For example, he led three 15,000 km (9,300 mi) trips to Tierra del Fuego by 2013.

He started a motorcycle touring company in his city of residence, Seattle in 1998, and has published a series of instructional and adventure documentary DVDs.

== Bibliography/filmography ==
- Pedersen, Helge (1998). 10 Years on 2 Wheels. Elfin Cove Press. ISBN 9780944958384.
- GlobeRiders documentary DVD series
  - Africa Adventure ISBN 0-9753156-8-4 (2011)
  - Eurasian Odyssey ISBN 0-9753156-7-6 (2009)
  - IndoChina Expedition ISBN 0-9753156-5-X (2008)
  - Silk Road Adventure ISBN 0-9753156-3-3 (2007)
  - Iceland Expedition ISBN 0-9753156-1-7 (2006)
- GlobeRiders instructional DVD series: BMW F800GS Adventure Touring Instructional DVD, BMW R1200GS Adventure Touring Instructional DVD, BMW R1100GS/1150GS Adventure Touring Instructional DVD, BMW F650GS Adventure Touring Instructional DVD
- Sterling Noren (Director); Andrew Cull, Paul Guillien, Tom Myers, Helge Pedersen, Bryce Stevens (Riders) (2011). Washington Adventure Backcountry Discovery Route (DVD). Noren Films/distributed by Touratech. ISBN 978-0-9830443-2-1. Archived from the original on 2014-11-17.
