= Jeffrey Polnaja =

Indonesian motorcycle rider

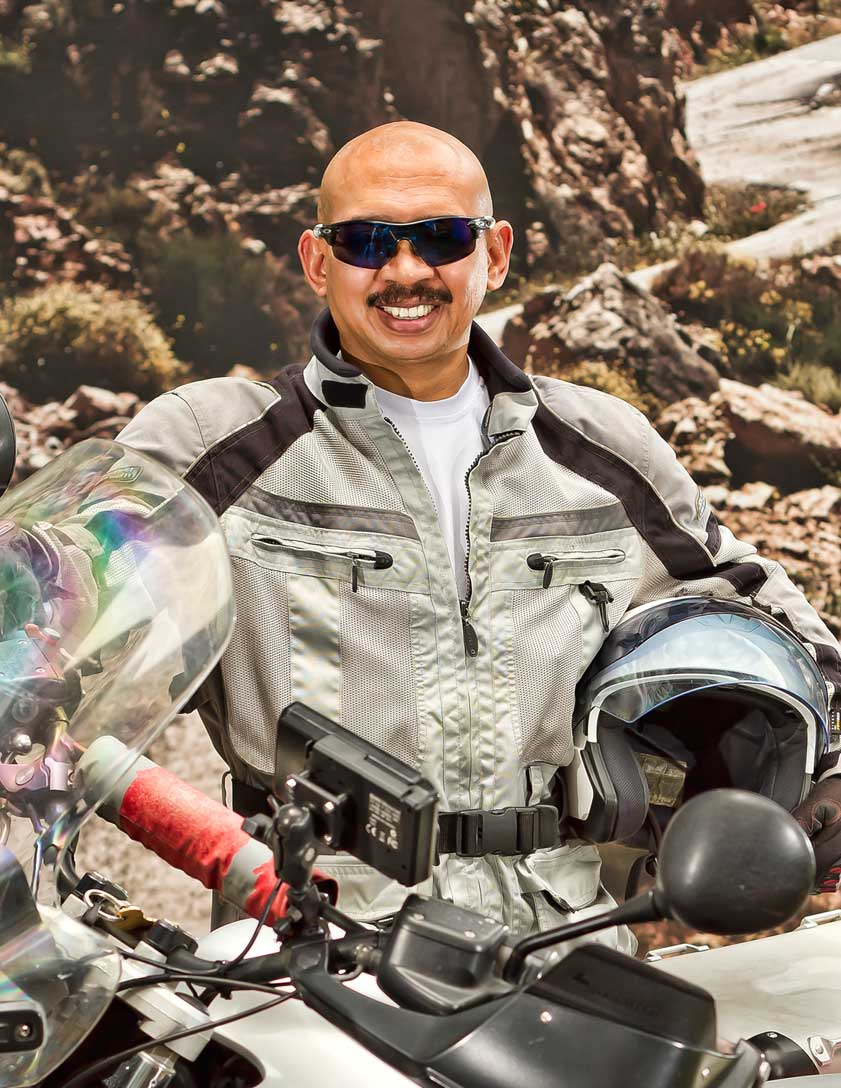
- Born: June 1962 (age 64); Bandung, Indonesia
- Occupation: Travel Writer
- Organization: Ride For Peace
- Known for: World Traveller, Adventure Rider
- Website: rideforpeace.net

Jeffrey Polnaja (born June 1962) is the first Indonesian motorcyclist to ride around the world.

== Biography ==
Jeffrey Polnaja was born in Bandung. He was an outdoor sports enthusiast from and early age, trying mountain climbing, sky gliding, horseback riding, and motorcycle off-road riding.

In 1978 he embarked on a long distance solo ride for the first time, riding a Honda CB100 motorcycle from Bandung across Java to Bali. In 1989 he joined the "Bala Turangga" equestrian club and won several national championship trophies. His specialization is show jumping.

On April 23, 2006, he embarked on a journey from Jakarta, Indonesia to ride around the world on his BMW R1150GS. The title of the book chronicling his journey is called "Ride For Peace". He traveled through Asia, North Africa, and Europe. On November 29, 2008, he returned to Indonesia to receive the "Lifetime Achievement Award", the highest award that can be given by Indonesian Motor Association (IMI) to the Indonesian automotive enthusiast. Since IMI was established more than 100 years ago (1906), only two people have been given this award.

After publishing a book, Wind Rider in 2011, Polnaja returned to Europe with his motorcycle and continued his journey. He started from Paris, made his way across Siberia, crossed to North America, Central America, South America., Australia. and returned to Indonesia in September, 2015.

By the time he finished his journey in Jakarta, he had ridden 420,000 kilometers, passed through 97 countries.

== Bibliography ==
- Polnaja, Jeffrey; Khalida, Laura (2011). Wind Rider Menyerempet Bahaya Demi Perdamaian Dunia [Wind Rider – Grazed by Danger for the Sake of World Peace] (in Indonesian) (first ed.). Jakarta: Qanita. ISBN 9786028579643. LCCN 2011318328.
