= Kane Avellano =

British adventurer and a long distance motorcycle rider

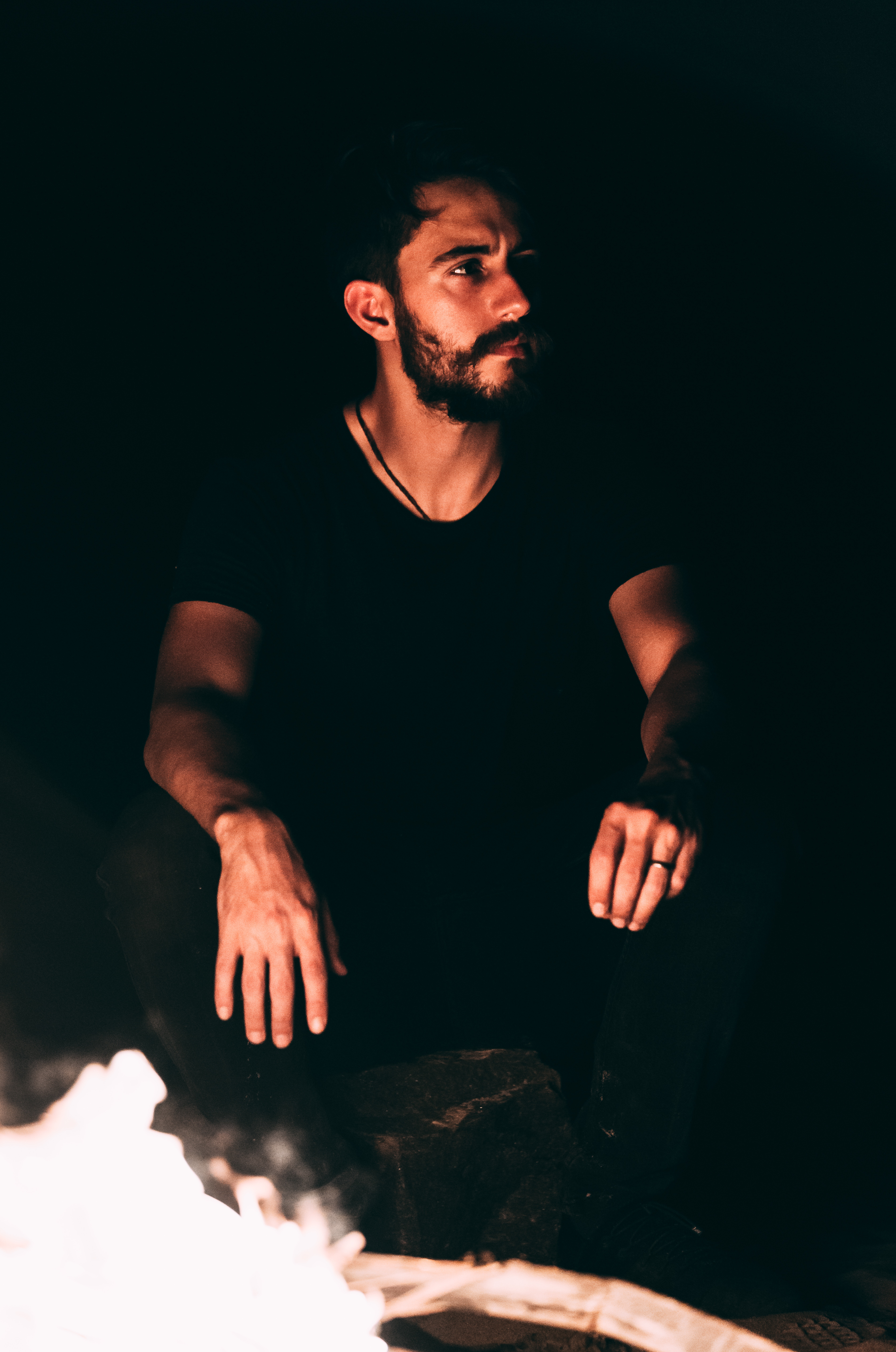
- Avellano at Kozhikode Beach for a commercial shoot for his company "Roads"
- Born: 20 January 1993 (age 33)
- Education: BA Computer Science, Newcastle University
- Occupations: Explorer, Entrepreneur
- Spouse: Lusine Manukyan (m. 2018)
- Children: 1
- Awards: Guinness World Record as the youngest person to circumnavigate the globe by motorcycle
- Website: kaneavellano.com

Kane Avellano (born 20 January 1993) is a British adventurer and a long distance motorcycle rider. As of August 2017, Avellano holds the Guinness World Record as the youngest person to circumnavigate the globe by motorcycle.

== Biography ==
Avellano was born in Spain and was brought up in South Shields by his mother, Louise Byers. He went to Harton Technology College and graduated from Newcastle University in 2015 after completing a degree in computer science.

== Riding ==
Avellano first started riding in the beginning of 2015 and completed his first long distance trip around Europe that year. Without a real plan, he rode for 7,000 miles (11,000 kilometres) on his Triumph Bonneville through France, Spain, Portugal, Andorra, Italy, Sicily, Switzerland and Belgium.

=== Record-breaking trip ===
In May 2016, Avellano set out on a longer trip in an attempt to circumnavigate the world and become the youngest person to do so. The total duration of the journey was 233 days, during which he covered over 28,000 milies (45,062 km), passing through 36 countries and six continents. He travelled through storms and monsoons with a number of near-death experiences. The trip was widely covered by news outlets and in August 2017, six months after the trip was over, Guinness World Records verified the record. Avellano completed the trip alone, with no support and minimal sponsorship, becoming the youngest person to circumnavigate the world by motorcycle solo (male). He completed the trip on a different Triumph bike, a 2008 865cc Bonneville, as his first bike was stolen following his return from the trip in Europe.
