= Traveling Music: Playing Back the Soundtrack to My Life and Times =

2004 Memoir by Neil Peart

First edition (publ. ECW Press)

Traveling Music: Playing Back the Soundtrack to My Life and Times (sometimes shortened to Traveling Music: the Soundtrack to My Life and Times or simply Traveling Music) is a 2004 memoir and autobiography by Rush drummer Neil Peart. It is Peart’s third book and it chronicles his travel by car to Big Bend National Park and back, as well as his autobiography from “birth to Rush”, and other then-recent events, such as Rush’s performance at Molson Canadian Rocks for Toronto and their then-upcoming 30th Anniversary Tour.

== Synopsis ==
While Peart’s wife, Carrie Nuttall, is off on a surfing vacation in Mexico, he decides to take his CD collection and his new BMW Z8 convertible to Big Bend National Park in Texas. He plays music from notable bands such as Linkin Park, Vertical Horizon, and even Rush’s then-newest album, Vapor Trails.

As he travels there and back, he reflects on things regarding performances from Rush in cities like Phoenix when Geddy was hit in the forehead by a Bic lighter, past travels by motorcycle with his best friend, Brutus. He also talked of further bicycle travels in Africa with David Mozer’s Bicycle Africa and his sickness after he returned, plus his reluctance to be a part of the ‘’Molson Canadian Rocks for Toronto’’ SARS benefit, only because they were a hometown band and people were asking about them.

Alternating chapters in the book consist of Peart’s autobiography. He speaks of his childhood from birth until he decides to travel to England to further his musical career in the first of these chapters, then talks of the music and concerts he watched on television when he got the chance to in the second chapter, and finishing with his life in England and after he moved back to his being hired by Rush.

The epilogue ends with a reflection on the band's preparations for the start of their 30th anniversary tour.
