= Nick Sanders =

British bicyclist, motorcyclist and author

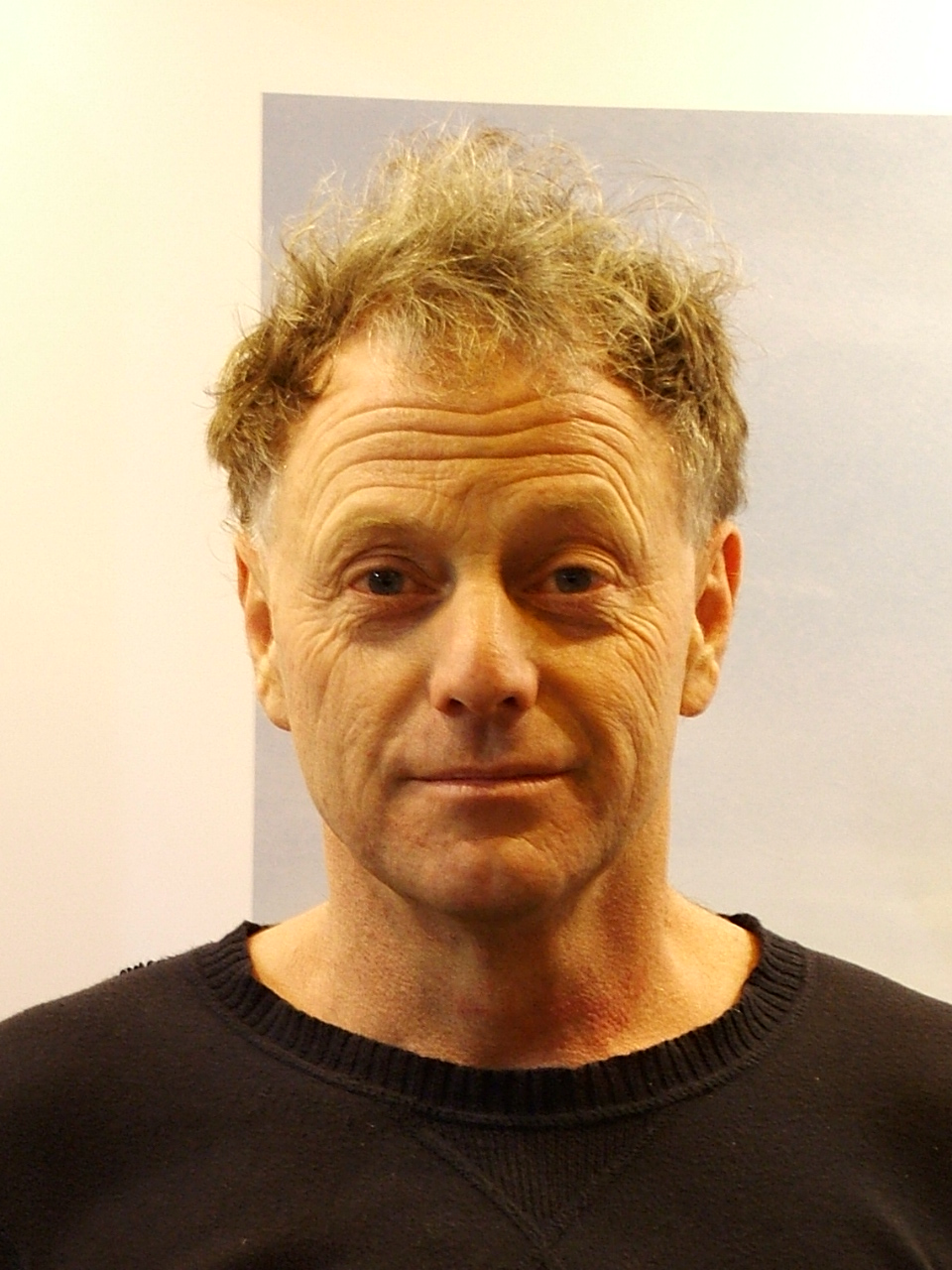
Nick Sanders

Nicholas Mark Sanders MBE (born 1958) is a British bicyclist, motorcyclist and author noted for his long-distance riding and has ridden around the world seven times.

In 1992 he rode around the world on a Royal Enfield Bullet motorcycle, the first person to do so.

On 9 June 1997, Sanders completed a world record 19,930-mile (32,070 km) motorbike circumnavigation of the world in a record riding time of 31 days 20 hours on a Triumph Daytona.

In 2005 Sanders completed a 2nd circumnavigation by motorbike taking 19 days 4 hours on a Yamaha R1.

In the summer of 2011, Sanders became the first person to ride from Alaska to Tierra del Fuego and back in under 49 days, 17 hours, a ride he completed on a Yamaha XT1200Z Super Ténéré. The first leg of the trip was completed in 21 days, just a few hours short of Dick Fish's record ride and easily outpacing the Guinness World Record of 35 days, currently held by Globebusters' Kevin and Julia Sanders.

Sanders normally eschews the dual-sport motorcycles traditionally employed for these types of journeys in favour of Yamaha Motor Company's flagship sport bike, the R1.

Sanders has taken groups of riders around the world, as well as Europe and the USA. He has also organised semi competitive road events in the UK. He has made films and written books about his journeys.

In 1981 Sanders set the original record for World record for cycling around the World, riding 13,609 miles (21,900 km) around the Northern Hemisphere in 138 days.
In 1984 he repeated the world cycling circumnavigation riding about 22,000 km in a time of 79 days. Guinness World Records set the rules in 2003 and did not record Sanders' time as he did not cross antipodal points on the globe
Sanders still holds the Guinness World Record for fastest ride around the coast of Great Britain, riding a verified 4,800 miles (7,720 km) in 22 days.
Sanders has also cycled to the source of the White Nile, across the Sahara to Timbuktu and the length of South America.

In 2024 Nick became the first person to circumnavigate the globe by electric bicycle, a feat that was made all the more difficult by the need to source a battery to power the pedal assist on each new continent.

He has also taken two narrowboats across the English Channel and along the entire length of the Danube to the Black Sea. Sanders holds a private pilot licence for a hot air balloon and flies microlights.

Born in 1958 in Manchester he now lives in Wales and has three children.

Sanders was appointed Member of the Order of the British Empire (MBE) in the 2019 Birthday Honours for services to endurance cycling and motorcycling.

== Bibliography ==
- Sanders, Nick (1988). The great bike ride: around the world in 80 days. Ashford Press. ISBN 978-1-85253-228-4.
- Sanders, Nick (1989). Short summer in South America. Ashford Press. ISBN 978-1-85253-201-7.
- Sanders, Nick (1999). Fastest Man Around the World. On the Road. ISBN 978-0-9537290-0-5.
- Sanders, Nick (2004). Loneliness of the Long Distance Biker. On the Road. ISBN 978-0-9549081-0-2.
