= David McGonigal =

Australian writer

- Born: 1950 (age 75–76); Griffith, New South Wales
- Occupation: Travel writer
- Writing career
- Language: English
- Years active: 1987-

David McGonigal (born 1950) is an Australian travel writer, a widely translated author and an internationally exhibited photographer. He is a fellow of the Royal Geographical Society and a past president of the Australian Society of Travel Writers. McGonigal has visited Antarctica more than 80 times (many as Expedition Leader) as well as making 20 trips to the Arctic including passing through both the Northwest and Northeast Passages and circumnavigating Svalbard.

== Early life ==
McGonigal was born in New South Wales, grew up in Singleton, NSW and attended Newington College (1966–1967). He studied Arts/Law at Sydney University (1968–1975) graduating in Arts in 1971 and Law in 1975.

== University courses ==
McGonigal has led Antarctica courses at the University of Sydney with guest lecturers Sir Edmund Hillary, Andrew Denton, Lincoln Hall and Phillip Law and has taken tours of Antarctica for the university.

== Motorcyclist ==
McGonigal has twice travelled around the world on a motorcycle and, in 1998, was the first person to motorcycle on all seven continents.

== Pilot ==
McGonigal is a diamond-badged sailplane pilot and was part of the team that set the current Australian height record.

== Photographer ==
McGonigal's photographs have been used by Qantas and the Australian Tourist Commission and have appeared in all major Australian publications and internationally in the Sunday Times, Esquire and the Los Angeles Times.

== Antarctica and the Arctic – the complete encyclopedia ==
In 2000, with Dr Lynn Woodworth, McGonigal wrote most of a 608-page book on Antarctica and the Arctic. He was the photographer and wrote sections on geography and history while Woodworth wrote most of the wildlife section. Antarctica – The Complete Story was published the following year in Australia and North America and in the UK and in Germany in 2003. The Japanese language edition was published in 2005. The abridged 224-page Antarctica – The Blue Continent was published in 2002 and has been translated into Russian, Dutch, French and Italian. In October 2008 an updated version, Antarctica – Secrets of the Southern Continent was simultaneously released in North America and Australia.

== Publications ==
- Antarctica and the Arctic: the complete encyclopedia David McGonigal and Lynn Woodworth (Willowdale, Ontario : Firefly Books, 2001)
- The Kimberley David McGonigal with foreword by Tim Fischer (Terrey Hills, N.S.W. : Australian Geographic, 2003)
- Wilderness Australia David McGonigal with photography by the author Robbi Newman and Gunter Schmida (Frenchs Forest, N.S.W. : Reed, 1987)
- The Australian Geographic book of the Kimberley David McGonigal (Terrey Hills, N.S.W. : Australian Geographic, 1990)
- Antarctica – The blue continent David McGonigal and Lynn Woodworth (Auckland, N.Z. : Random House New Zealand, 2002)
- Antarctica – The blue continent David McGonigal and Lynn Woodworth (Toronto, Ont.; Buffalo, N.Y. : Firefly Books, 2003)
- Antarctica: the complete story David McGonigal and Lynn Woodworth (Noble Park, Vic. : Five Mile Press, 2001)
- Sydney Harbour David McGonigal and David Messent (Sydney : David Messent Photography, 1994)
- Sydney David McGonigal and John Borthwick (Singapore : APA, 2003)
- Melbourne David McGonigal and John Borthwick (Singapore : APA Publications, 1989)
- Australia David McGonigal and John Borthwick (Singapore : APA Publications, c1994)
- Great Barrier Reef David McGonigal and John Borthwick (Hong Kong : APA Publications, 1991)
