= Long-distance horse riding =

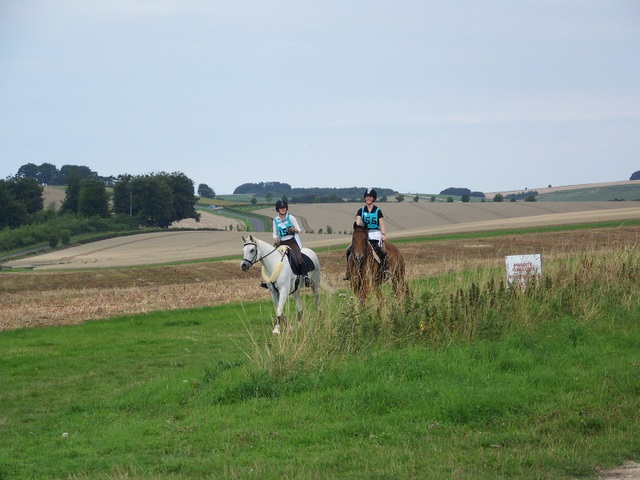
Riders on course for Long-distance riding

== Overview ==
Long-distance horse riding has played a pivotal role in carrying humans in a range of settings for explorers and warriors to cover, vast and difficult terrains. This has eventuated to the modern-day use of the horse now primarily for recreational pursuits. There are two main types of long-distance riding, competitive trail riding and endurance rides. In an endurance ride, discussed in this article, the winning horse is the first one to cross the finish line while stopping periodically to pass a veterinary check that deems the animal in good health and fit to continue. As with human marathon running, many riders will participate to improve their horse's personal best performance and consider finishing the distance with a proper vet completion record to be a "win". Long-distance riding also refers to the equestrian sport of endurance riding that is recognised by the peak international governing body, the Federation Equestre Internationale (FEI). Long-distance riding is not conducted as an Olympic event; however, it does compete at the World Equestrian Games that are held every four years (FEI,2020). The sport involves horse and rider taking mapped or unmapped routes in order to reach the finishing point. The distances covered in competition can differ depending upon competition length, and experience of both rider and horse. One day events typically do not exceed 160 kilometres in a day. In the United States, most endurance rides are either 50 or 100 miles (160 km) long. Shorter rides, called Limited Distance rides (LD), are organised for new riders to the sport or young horses being trained. Historically long-distance riding originated by riding along national and state trails across the United States. Then heading further afield and through harsh landscapes of the nomadic Bedouin people, that adapted to the challenging and isolating environment, and so went on to spread globally.

Any breed can compete, but the Arabian generally dominates the top levels because of the breed's stamina and natural endurance abilities.

== History ==
The origins of long-distance riding can be traced back to hundreds of years ago with war horses in cavalry and early explorers. the earliest uses of the Arabian horse breed. It was commonly used across the vast desert landscapes identified as North Africa, Arabian Peninsula and Iraq, the people of this region are known as the Bedouin people. The horses were utilised to carry their riders over long distances and, also involved in horse-to-horse combat. In the United States there are accounts of many long-distance rides occurring from 1791 when George Washington rode from Augusta to Columbia that was nearly a hundred-mile ride in one day, taking ten and a half hours to complete. Long-distance riding has played a significant role in shaping the exploration across many frontiers and evolving into the equestrian sport it is recognised as today.

Though the need to ride long distances has existed since the domestication of the horse, endurance riding as an organised activity was first developed in the United States based on European cavalry (particularly Polish and Russian WWI) and breeding program tests requiring the ability to carry 300 pounds (140 kg) over 100 miles (160 km) in one day. Organised endurance riding as a formal sport began in 1955, when Wendell Robie and a group of equestrians rode from the Lake Tahoe area across the Sierra Nevada Range to Auburn in under 24 hours. They followed the historic Western States Trail. This ride soon became known as the Tevis Cup, and it remains the most difficult of any 100-mile ride in the world because of the severe terrain, high altitude, and 100-degree (~37 °C) temperatures. Endurance riding first was brought to Europe in the 1960s.

== Suitable Horse Breeds ==
There are particular aspects of physiological conformation that long-distance horses require to be best suited for long-distance. In particular an ‘endurance horse needs to take in a lot of oxygen’ and as such, it is necessary from a conformation standpoint to have large nostrils, good width between the branches of the jaw, and a clean throat latch all allow for easier air intake’. A long-distance horse will also be clear of wind-sucking, this term refers to when a horse opens their mouth and sucks air inwards. This can be problematic from a conformation aspect as it can be a sign of further underlying issues such as ulcers, respiratory and dental problems.

Well known breeds associated with long-distance riding include:

- Arabian
- Australian Stock Horse
- Quarter Horse
- Mustang

There are a number of common physiological attributes of these breeds, most prominently is their stamina to sustain and traverse challenging and long terrain. Psychologically a strong mental attitude is important in order for horses to successfully conserve energy. The attribute of bigger is better does not apply for endurance horses as opposed to their performance and show horse counter parts. This is because the ability to evenly and effectively carry weight is of more importance in the discipline of long-distance riding.

== Governing Organisations ==
There are a number of governing bodies across a number of countries and their respective states and territories globally. That preside over regulations relating to safety and participation in long-distance riding

=== Federation Equestrian International (FEI) ===
The peak international governing body Federation Equestrian International task is to provide; frameworks to ensure integrity in all disciplines. In specific regarding to the sport of endurance it emphasizes the intense tactical and mental demands for both, as well as the guidelines that place equine & athlete safety with paramount importance. Endurance became a recognised Fédération Équestre Internationale discipline in 1978, and the international organisation has since set down rules with the welfare of the horse as top priority. In the United States, endurance rides are sanctioned by the FEI, the AERC, or both and seldom by the FEI alone. Usually the stand-alone rides are special FEI rides like the North American Team Challenge. When both the FEI and AERC sanction a ride, the FEI rules prevail.

Two well-known American 100-mile (160 km) endurance rides are The Western States Trail Ride, \held in California, and the Old Dominion ride, held in Virginia.

One-day international competitions are 40–160 km. Multi-day competitions are longer but have daily distance limits. Those that are FEI recognized and are broken into the following categories:

- CEI * (one star): minimum average distance each day is 80–119 km (50–74 mi)
- CEI **: 120–139 km (75–86 mi) in one day or 70–89 km (43–55 mi) per day over two days
- CEI ***: 140–160 km (87–99 mi) in one day, or 90–100 km (56–62 mi) per day over two days, or 70–80 km (43–50 mi) per day over three days or more.
- CEI ****: Senior Championships of a minimum of 160 km (99 mi) in one day, Young Horse. Championships for 7 year olds – maximum distance 130 km (81 mi), Junior and Young Rider Championships of a minimum of 120 km (75 mi), maximum of 130 km (81 mi) in one day.

Note: CEI is the notation that the competition is an FEI-approved international competition.

When first recognised by the FEI, there were only four international competitions. This grew to an average of 18 rides per year by 1998, when the first World Championships were held in the United Arab Emirates. The World Championships provided a huge boost to the sport, and, by 2005, there were 353 international competitions, second to only eventing and show jumping. Due to the huge increase in international competition, endurance is growing quite rapidly worldwide.

=== United States Equestrian Federation ===
The United States Equestrian organisation originates from 1917 its purpose was to unite riders, competitors, coaches and horse enthusiasts. As the national governing body, it endeavours to foster growth and participation across all sports. They also contribute to the greater protection and assistance of horse welfare in both crisis situations and natural disasters. The Federation also operates a number of committees for each discipline, safety & welfare, ethics and athletes. Endurance riding is defined by the United States as ‘sport covering variations in altitude, terrain, and weather that tests the fitness and stamina of the horse as well as the athlete’s discipline and horsemanship skills. Periodic checkpoints occur throughout the competition to ensure the health and fitness of the horse and athlete. Given their ability to meet and master physical challenges’.

=== American Endurance Ride Conference ===
The majority of American endurance rides are sanctioned by the American Endurance Ride Conference (AERC), founded in 1972 as a governing body for long-distance riding. AERC's motto is "To finish is to win." Though the first horse and rider to finish the race are technically the winner, the majority of AERC riders aim for a "completion" rather than a placing. The majority of competitors are amateurs that participate in endurance as a hobby rather than a profession, generally owning a small number of horses and riding them themselves.

In addition to traditional "endurance" distances of 50 or more miles, AERC includes a Limited Distance (LD) division. LD's are at least 25 miles and can be as long as 35 miles. Though originally introduced as training rides for beginning riders and horses, they evolved into their own level of competition.

All AERC clubs are required to offer completion awards to all horse and rider teams who meet completion criteria including the horse being judged "fit to continue", as well placings and Best Condition awards. Various regional clubs and organisations offer further recognition's and awards. Widely acclaimed riders are typically those with high lifetime mileage accumulation and minimal non-completions.

=== Equestrian Australia ===
The Equestrian Federation of Australia was first formatted on a state by state basis, which led to recognition and creation of a national body in 1951–1952 in order to format end facilitate the acceptance of an Olympic Equestrian Team. It also now serves as national body to improve equestrian safety with a dedicated committee to assist with incident planning & management, concussion protocols and advice. Equestrian Australia oversees all equestrian sport pursuits including Endurance riding. It is role as the national body ensures good practice towards the animals with strict veterinarian checks to ensure they a fit to perform and be ridden. Internationally and within Australia the winner is deemed by being first past the post and to clear a veterinary check.

== Equipment ==
Participation in endurance riding is permitted as long as approved equipment and personal protective equipment is used. The Australian Endurance Riders Association lists guidelines in order to compete and complete courses in Australia, that includes: Approved specialised riding helmet, Saddle pad or cloth and the saddle that is typical -all purpose, western or a stock saddle and bridle. At an introductory level of competition whips and spurs are not permitted, or the use of anything that may be used to whip a horse.

== Events ==
At a state, national and international level endurance events are held for all riders of different abilities. The premier Endurance rides are the ‘FEI World Equestrian Games, staged every four years in the middle of the Olympic cycle; the FEI World Endurance Championships, held in every Olympic year; and the biannual FEI European Endurance Championships.’ FEI stipulates the high-performance events that have global participation.

=== International: World Equestrian Games ===
Long-distance riding at the highest international level is at the World Equestrian Games, the distance of competition for each horse and rider partnership is run over 160 km course completed in one day. Rules in place for competing at the FEI level state that each country can send a maximum of four horse and rider combinations. And that the course will have five loops, that need to be completed, at the end of each loop there will be a compulsory veterinarian check, the horse needs to successfully pass the check in order to be allowed to continue on. On completion of the race all horses are checked again over a specified period of time. The individual winner is decided by the first horse past the post, having completed and passed all vet checks on course. The three fastest times from each competing country will determine the overall champion teams component of endurance competition at World Equestrian Games.

=== Australia ===
In Australia events run across all state and territories and are put on by each state organisation the follow long-distance rides are listed as events on the Australian Endurance Riders Association.

- Mount Cole Endurance Fundraiser, Distances: 120 km elevation, 40 km.
- Queensland Bom Bom, Distances: 40,80 and 100 km elevation.
- State Championships held annually, with Distances: 40,80 and 120 km
- These are just a few of the many annually held long-distance rides across Australia

== Safety in the Sport ==
Equestrian sports are among the most dangerous sports, this includes long-distance riding. The combination of an unpredictable animal and rider can equate to a large risk with involvement in the sport. Ensuring and improving safety is an ongoing and of paramount importance for both the horse and rider. The incidence and ‘severity of injuries tend to vary somewhat among different countries, making identification of key factors and direct comparisons difficult’. The statistical data from 2008 from Loder showed the most common way to sustain an injury from horse riding is by falling off. Also noted was being kicked, dragged, crushed underneath, and trodden on. There are a number of considered variables in order to mitigate injury is managed by accounting for rider experience, conditions during the competition, the animal and unexpected conditions. Horses are attuned to strong awareness of humans Hausberger researched understanding of the power of gaze, posture, speed and approach between horse and human interactions. This research investigated how aspects of human body language can impact equine behaviour. Specifically related to endurance riding inherent risks identified were a young or inexperienced horse or a young rider are more likely to be at a greater risk of injury. This calls for consideration of attributes for rider psychology when assessing horse and rider potential risk and ability to perceive and assess changing conditions when riding. To further provide safeguarded measures there is stipulation needed for practices to protect the rider need to be integrated into daily riding and training, however while necessary steps and policies can be taken to improve equestrian pursuits and riding there is a need for awareness and consideration that horses still remain unpredictable and will not always behave in a predictable manner.

== Notable riders ==
Notable riders include Anna Hingley across Australia, and Aimé Félix Tschiffely across South and North America.

There has been considerable discussion about daily distances travelled by horses in various situations and contexts.

== See also ==
- Long-distance motorcycle riding
