= Ghost Rider: Travels on the Healing Road =

Book by Neil Peart

- Author: Neil Peart
- Language: English
- Genre: Non-fiction, memoir
- Publisher: ECW Press
- Publication date: July 5, 2002
- Publication place: Canada
- Media type: Print (Hardback & Paperback)
- Pages: 400 p.p.
- ISBN: 1-55022-548-0
- OCLC: 49796529
- Preceded by: The Masked Rider: Cycling in West Africa
- Followed by: Traveling Music: Playing Back the Soundtrack to My Life and Times

Ghost Rider: Travels on the Healing Road is a 2002 philosophical travel memoir by Neil Peart, drummer and main lyricist for the Canadian progressive rock band Rush. It chronicles Peart's long-distance motorcycle riding throughout North and Central America in the late 1990s as he contemplated his life and came to terms with his grief over the deaths of his daughter Selena in August 1997 and his common-law wife Jackie in June 1998. It was published by ECW Press.

== Story ==
Peart begins his story by explaining the beginning of his travels by motorcycle from his home in Quebec to Telegraph Creek, British Columbia. In reality he has no schedule, no restriction in time or life for that matter. In time, he finds himself traveling from Canada to Alaska and south through the United States to Mexico then to Belize. Eventually, he travels (by plane) back to his home in Canada where he continues a series of letters to his friend Brutus. He then continues his journey, which ultimately ends at his home.

=== Conclusion ===
The epilogue of Ghost Rider concludes with Peart summing up what has recently happened with him and his band Rush. He explains his new love for life (including his new wife Carrie) and how he had a revelation/epiphany of some sort, ultimately finding a reason to live. He explains that he found a will to also resume his career with Rush in Toronto.

== Reception ==
An excerpt from chapters 1, 4, and 6 was published in the Art section of Toronto Star on July 27, 2002. The Library Journal review called the writing lyrical and the story poignant as a travel adventure and a memoir.
