= Simon Gandolfi =

English long-distance motorcycle rider

Simon Ralph William Gandolfi
- Born: 1933 (age 92–93); London
- Known for: Long-distance motorcycle riding
- Website: simongandolfi.com

Simon Gandolfi (born February 11, 1933, in London) is an English writer and long-distance motorcycle rider. He has ridden over 110,000 kilometres (68,000 mi) on solo, unsupported rides in America and India including:

- 2007–2008, Mexico to Tierra del Fuego via Mexico, Guatemala, Honduras, Nicaragua, Costa Rica, Panama, Colombia, Ecuador, Peru, Bolivia and Argentina: 34,000 km (21,000 mi) on a 125 cc Honda
- April–December 2009, Tierra del Fuego to New York: 46,000 km (29,000 mi) on the same Honda
- November–June 2010 – 2011, India: 18,000 km (11,000 mi) on 125 cc Honda Stunner
- April–October 2013, India: 16,000 km (9,900 mi) TVS Motor Company TVS Phoenix 125

A 2010 tour of India was undertaken in defiance of the 2008 Mumbai attacks, of which he said "The attack infuriated me and I saw all the tourists cancelling and so I rode around India, and if a grand old man like me can ride around India at my age, it can't be that dangerous." The 2008 solo ride was undertaken when Gandolfi was 73, 2010 when he was 77, and the 2013 solo ride around his 80th birthday. The 2013 ride around India was published as a series of contributions to The Guardian's "Backpacking" travelogue section between June and October of that year. The column on his ride, which was planned to span India to England, ended when he suffered broken ribs and other injuries after being kicked off his bike by a heifer in the road.

Gandolfi's father, Ralph Vincent Gandolfi-Hornyold, Duca Gandolfi, Marchese di Melati, died in 1938. He is the stepson of Lt. Colonel Euan Rabagliati DFC, MC, Legion of Honour, British pilot in World War I, and World War II MI6 officer.

== Bibliography ==
Even With The Shutters Closed 1965 Peter Davies ISBN 978-1871565591.

100 Kilo Club. Wildwood House 1975 ISBN 978-0704501621

The Reluctant Stud, Sphere. 1981. ISBN 978-0722138038

France Security. Frederick Muller. 1981. ISBN 978-0-856341168

Golden Girl. Orion. 1992. ISBN 978-1855920088

Golden Web. Orion. 1994. ISBN 978-1857975116

Golden Vengeance. Orion. 1995 ISBN 978-1855928213

White Sands. Orion. 1996. ISBN 978-1857976915

Aftermath. Orion. 2000. ISBN 978-0752832296

- Old Man on a Bike. HarperCollins. 2008. ISBN 978-1906321666.
- Old Men Can't Wait. Shuvvy Press. 2011. ISBN 978-0956430526.
  - Arcadia Press reprint 2013 ISBN 978-1-910050-61-3
  - An Indian Love Affair. Arcadia. 2016. ISBN 978-1910050811
