= Paul Pelland =

American motorcycle rider

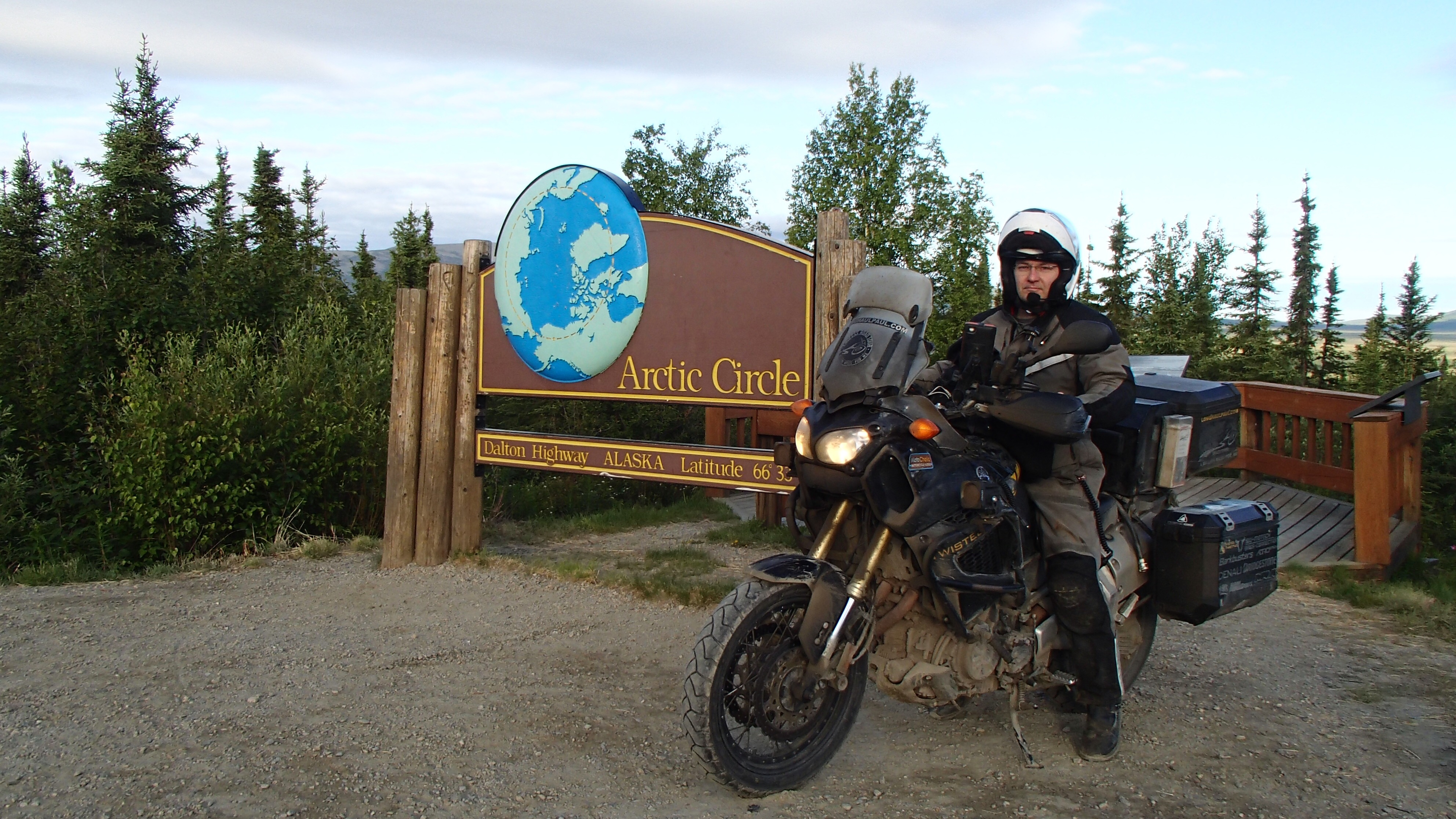
Longhaulpaul Chasing the Cure

Paul Pelland (also known as longhaulpaul) (born c. 1966) is an American long distance motorcyclist who has set many world records while living with multiple sclerosis. He lives in Londonderry, New Hampshire.

He finished his first Iron Butt Rally – an 11-day 11,000-mile motorcycle endurance event known as "The World's Toughest Motorcycle Competition" – on a Ural motorcycle in 2001. He suffered many mechanical issues along the way and had to make new pushrods out of drill bits he found at a hardware store.

In 2003, before receiving his diagnosis, Pelland was a top ten finisher of the Iron Butt Rally. As he continued through the latter portion of this rally, he found that he could not remember the name of a fellow rider at an accident scene. He also found his hands numb and experienced memory and cognitive issues. He learned shortly after this experience that these were symptoms of multiple sclerosis. Pelland retired from competition after the 2003 Iron Butt Rally and gave up riding for nearly a decade.

In 2012, Pelland made his diagnosis public and began documenting a million mile journey, "Chasing the Cure for Multiple Sclerosis". He travels the country as an inspirational speaker sharing his story and encouraging others to continue following their passions regardless of what obstacles are in their path.

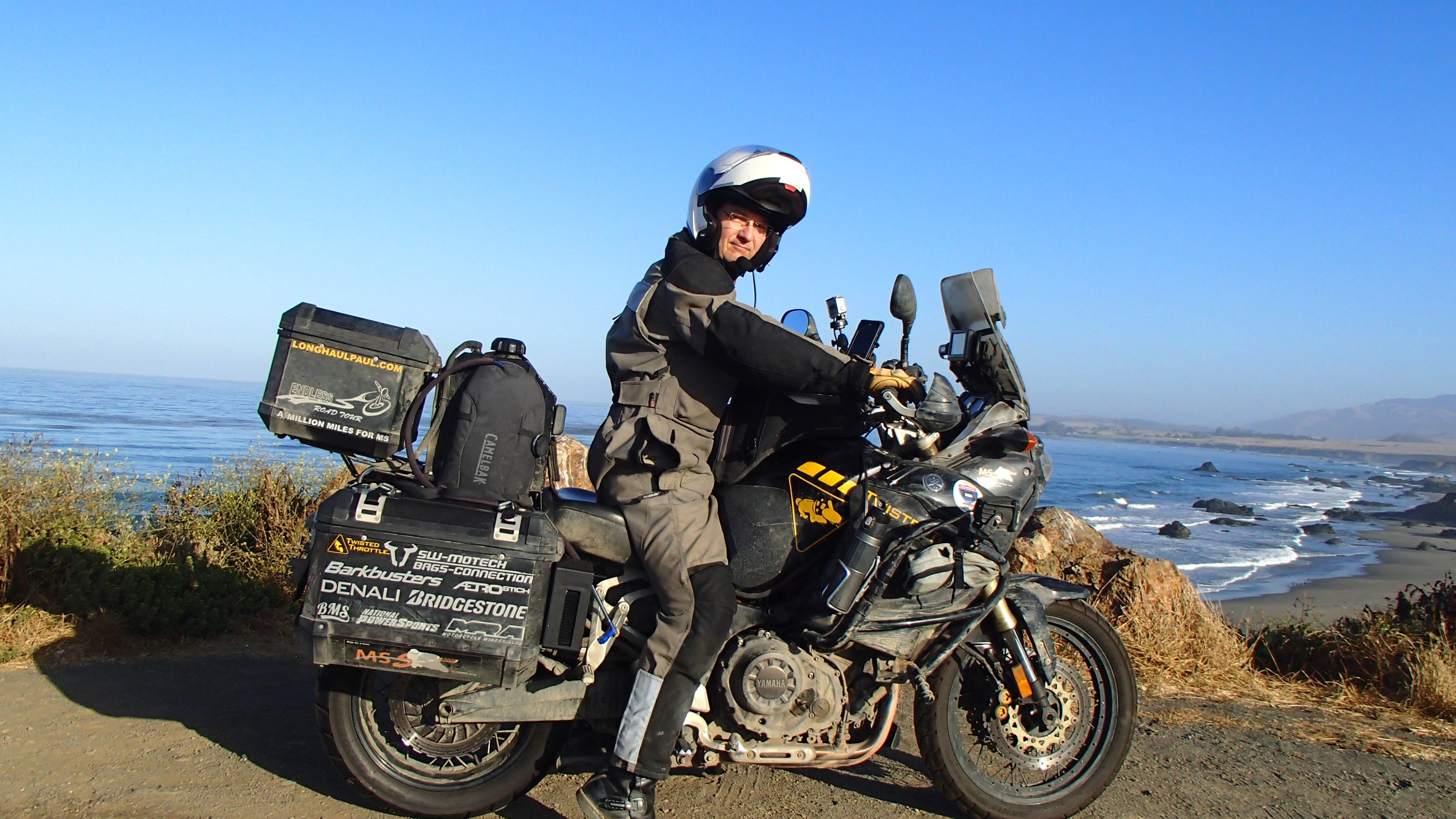
Paul Pelland

On September 29, 2012, Pelland, sponsored by National Powersports, set a world record by riding 1,000 miles in under 24 hours on 100 different motorcycles. This was his first fundraiser for the National MS Society.

Pelland said he will continue to ride until he meets his one million mile goal. He calls this "Longhaulpaul's Endless Road Tour" and is to raise funds for Multiple Sclerosis.

In May 2014, Pelland rode a Piaggio scooter c. 1,000 miles (1,600 km) from Boston to Chicago in 16.5 hours, wearing a blue tuxedo over an Aerostich motorcycle riding suit. At this point he had logged 55,000 miles of his one-million-mile goal for MS awareness and fundraising.

On November 6, 2016, Pelland set his second world record by being the first motorcyclist to document riding 28 hours in the same day. By traveling west across four time zones on the day daylight saving time ends, he rode 2000 miles and 28 hours all on the same calendar day. He raised $6000 for MS with this ride.

Overlooking CURECHASER at Barber Motorsports Museum

Curechaser, Paul's first Yamaha Super Tenere is on display at Barber Motorsports Museum in Birmingham Alabama after setting the record and completing 172,000 miles of the million mile journey.

In 2018, Pelland rode a Yamaha Star Venture 24 hours without stopping on a dynamometer while entertaining live on social media. Nonstop to Nowhere fundraising world record attempt raised over $28,000 for MS charities.

In July 2021, Pelland set his fourth world record by becoming the first rider to document riding coast to coast in under 50 hours on a naked, raked out chopper. The Iron Butt Association's 50CC GOLD attempt was achieved after Pelland rode 2930 miles in 46 hours, from the Atlantic Ocean in Wilmington North Carolina to San Francisco. The Nut on a Bolt ride raised over $20,000.

As of November 2021, Pelland has ridden 470,000 miles for MS while speaking at over 250 events across the United States while raising almost $250,000 for MS Charities.
