= BMW G650GS =

G650GS
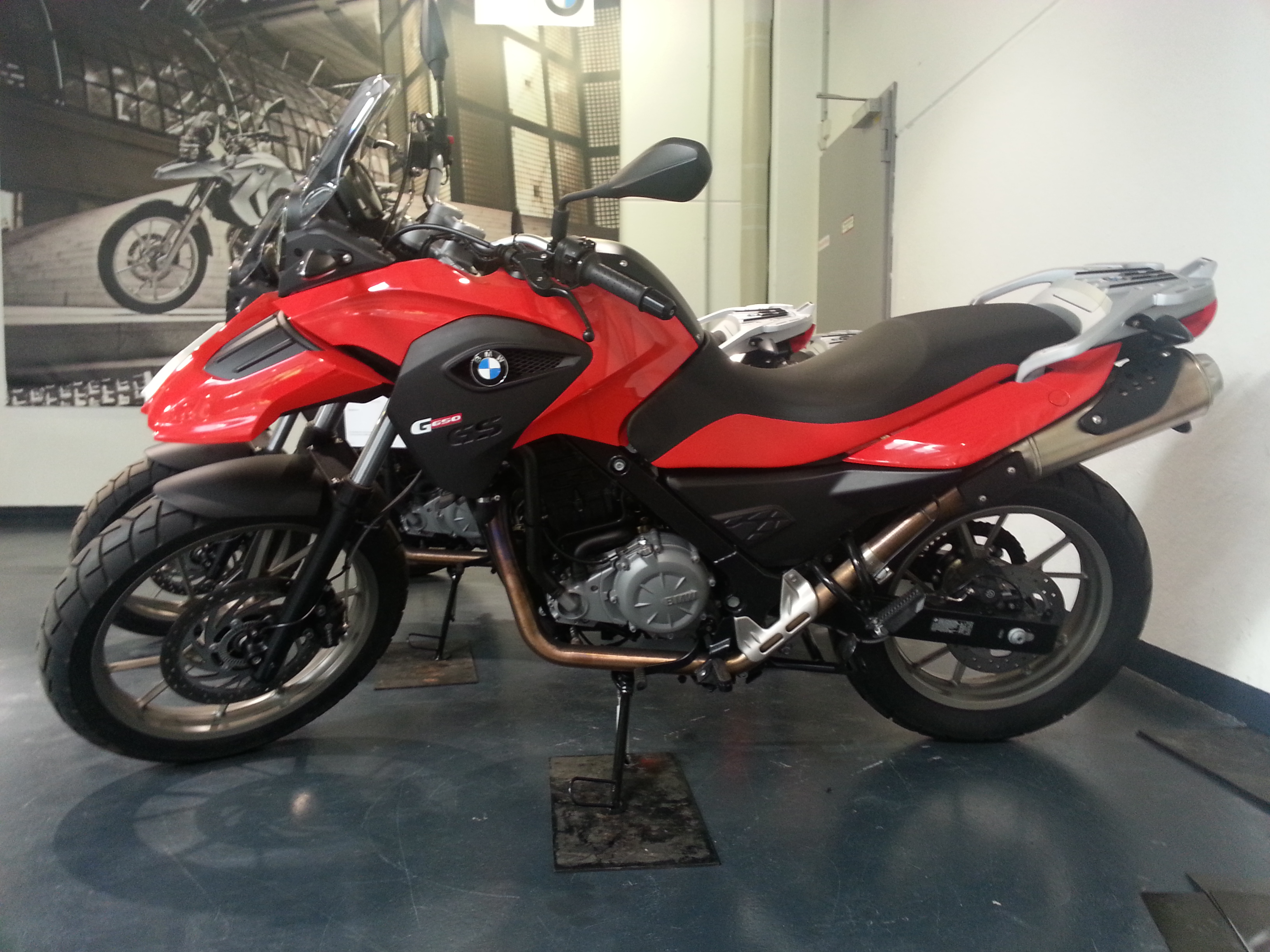
- 2013 BMW G650GS
- Manufacturer: BMW
- Also called: G650 Sertão
- Production: 2008–2016
- Assembly: Germany
- Engine: 652 cc (39.8 cu in), single-cylinder 4-stroke engine, four valves, two overhead camshafts, dry sump lubrication, water-cooled
- Bore / stroke: 100 mm × 83 mm (3.9 in × 3.3 in)
- Compression ratio: 11.5:1
- Top speed: 170 km/h
- Power: 35 kilowatts (47 hp) at 6,500 rpm
- Torque: 60 newton-metres (44 lbf⋅ft) at 5,000 rpm
- Transmission: 5-speed

The BMW G650GS and G650 Sertão are motorcycles manufactured by BMW Motorrad, part of the BMW group.

In late 2008, BMW relaunched the original single-cylinder F650GS under the new name G650GS in the United States, Latin America, China, Taiwan and Australia. The new G650GS is essentially the 2007 single-cylinder F650GS brought back into production with some minor modifications and with the engine assembled by Loncin in China instead of Rotax in Austria, but still using parts manufactured by Rotax in Europe. The finished engines are shipped back to BMW in Germany where the bikes are assembled. G650GS models with the Chinese-assembled engines are painted black, while in the earlier European-assembled engines were finished in silver. For a short period before discontinuation of the bike in 2007 the engines were assembled by Kymco in Taiwan.

The G650GS received some upgrades over the F650GS of 2007: the engine now produces 3 additional horsepower (now 53 hp) and received a stronger 400 watt alternator. In the United States and Australia, ABS and heated grips are now standard equipment instead of additional cost options. An emergency services specific version of the G650GS, fitted with blue lights and sirens, is available from BMW Motorrad's Official and special duty vehicles division.

In 2010, at the EICMA show in Italy, BMW Motorrad announced the global availability of the G650GS with a slightly down-rated engine producing 35 kW (47 hp).

In 2012, BMW released the G650GS Sertão, which is a more off-road capable version. The Sertão fills the product gap that was left when the F650GS Dakar was discontinued in 2008.

The G650GS and Sertão were discontinued in 2017.
