= Long-distance motorcycle riding =

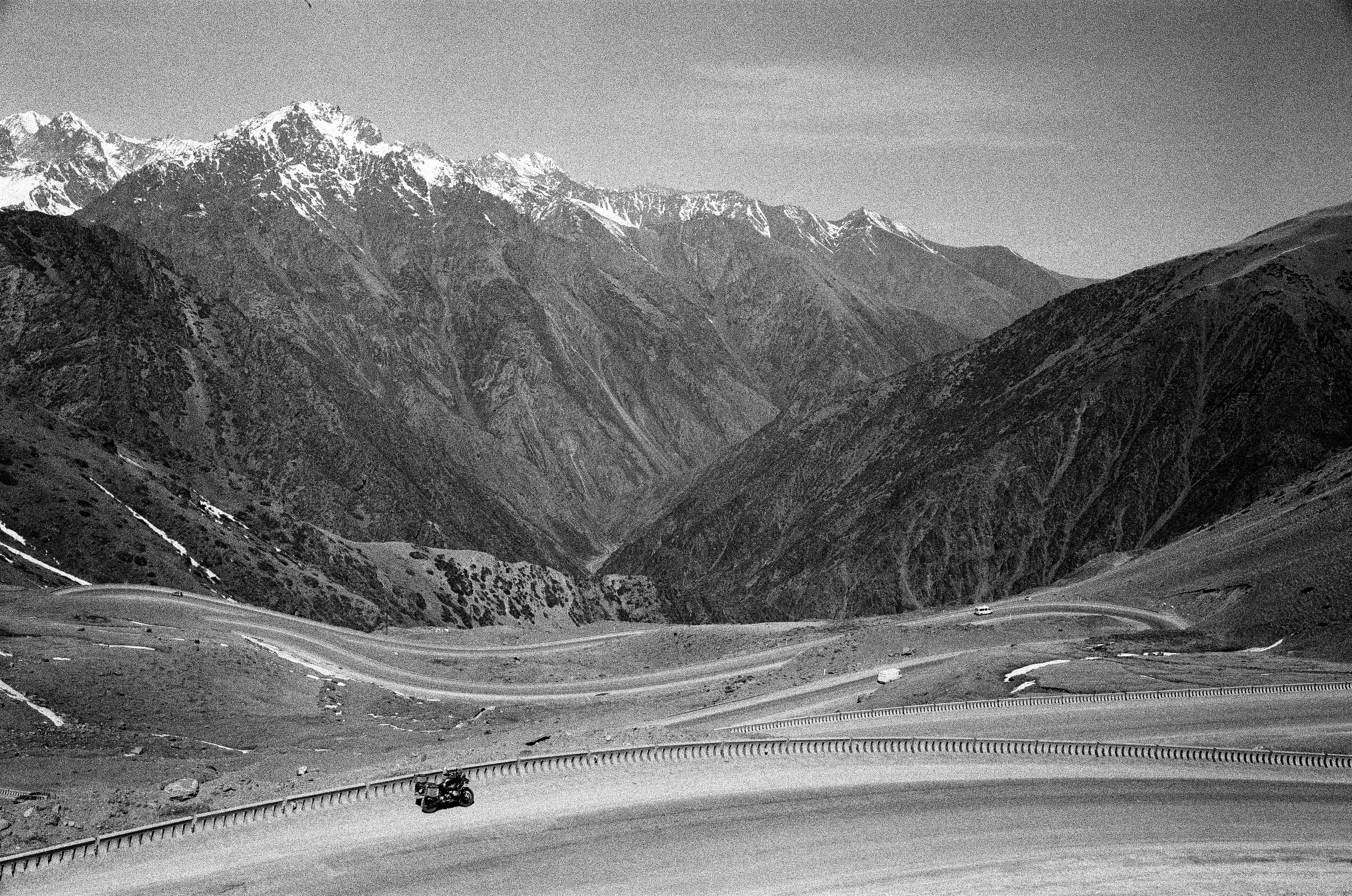
BMW R1200GS Adventure travelling through the M41 in Kyrgyzstan

Long-distance riding is the activity of riding motorcycles over long distances, both competitively and as a pastime. A goal of long-distance riding is to explore one's endurance while riding a motorcycle, sometimes across several countries.

Non-competitive forms of long-distance riding are typically a form of motorcycle touring, sometimes as part of an organised rally. Competitive long-distance motorcycle riding consists of riding in endurance events such as the French Bol d'Or and the 24 Heures du Mans.

== History ==
The most prominent organized form of competitive long-distance riding, the Iron Butt Rally, grew out of an idea by American rider Mike Rose, who taking inspiration from the car-touring event One Lap of America wondered whether a motorcyclist could loop the 48 contiguous U.S. states in eleven days. Ten riders took up the challenge in the rally's first running in 1984, starting and finishing at a dealership near Philadelphia, Pennsylvania, with four entrants tying for first place. Two years later, rally organizers Michael Kneebone, Richard Hoffman, and Faye Hoffman, formally established the Iron Butt Association. Falling interest led to the rally being skipped in 1988, and it did not return until 1991, when a revived event under the new association's management drew 27 entrants. The rally has been held only in odd-numbered years ever since.

== Events ==
Long-distance riders may participate in a number of structured and unstructured events.

=== Rallies ===
Endurance riders sometimes engage in endurance events known as rallies. Rallies take on a multitude of formats, differing in duration (anywhere from 8 hours to 11 days), style, types of roads ridden and so forth. Some rallies have been referred to as "advanced scavenger hunts" and require participants to locate specific locations (a series of "Little House on the Prairie" locations, for instance), perform specific tasks (take a Polaroid photograph of a giant baseball bat, write down time, date and mileage and so forth), and sundry other items during the duration of the rally.

==== Iron Butt Rally ====
The 'Olympics' of all endurance rallies is the Iron Butt Rally (IBR). This event takes place over eleven days, on odd numbered years, and is run by the Iron Butt Association. The inaugural rally departed over the Labor Day holiday weekend in 1984, but recent runnings have instead started in mid-June: the 2025 Iron Butt Rally began and ended in Coralville, Iowa, between 16 and 27 June. The Iron Butt Rally, like all endurance rallies, is not a race. In the early years this was an obscure event with only a dozen or so riders. However, as distance riding has gained popularity over the past decade, the event has become so crowded that the IBA has imposed a limit of 125 riders. Entry is via lottery and discretion of the rallymasters. The basic concept is a lap around the lower 48 United States, with possible diversions into Canada and Alaska. There are interim checkpoints, at which the rider must appear within a brief time window or forfeit any bonus points acquired on that leg. There is no advantage to arriving early at a checkpoint. The goal is to earn the most points, which are not directly related to number of miles traveled. The winning rider may not be the one with the most miles ridden.

Other endurance rides recognized by the Iron Butt Association are not competitions, but are documented rides (such as the Saddlesore 1000, the BunBurner 1500, the BunBurner Gold 1500, the 100 Coast-to-Coast-to-Coast insanity) that require the rider to meticulously record mileage, fuel taken on and other factors in order to complete a documented ride.

==== Other rallies ====
There are a large number of other rallies, with shorter distances and more accessible participation entry, available to the competitive and long-distance rider. Some popular 24-hr rallies are the Utah 1088, Minuteman 1000, Land of Enchantment 1000, Mason Dixon 20-20, Not Superman Rally, Texas Two Step, Cal 24, Minnesota 1000, and many others. For those looking for an IBR-like event, there are multi-day rallies such as the Butt Lite, Northwest Passage, and newcomers Spank and Ten 'N Ten. These rallies are all put on by rallymasters and volunteers who devote countless unpaid hours to their events. The riders themselves are competing for nothing more than bragging rights and the personal challenge. These rallies are also viewed as training grounds for the 11-day Iron Butt Rally.

== Notable long-distance riders ==
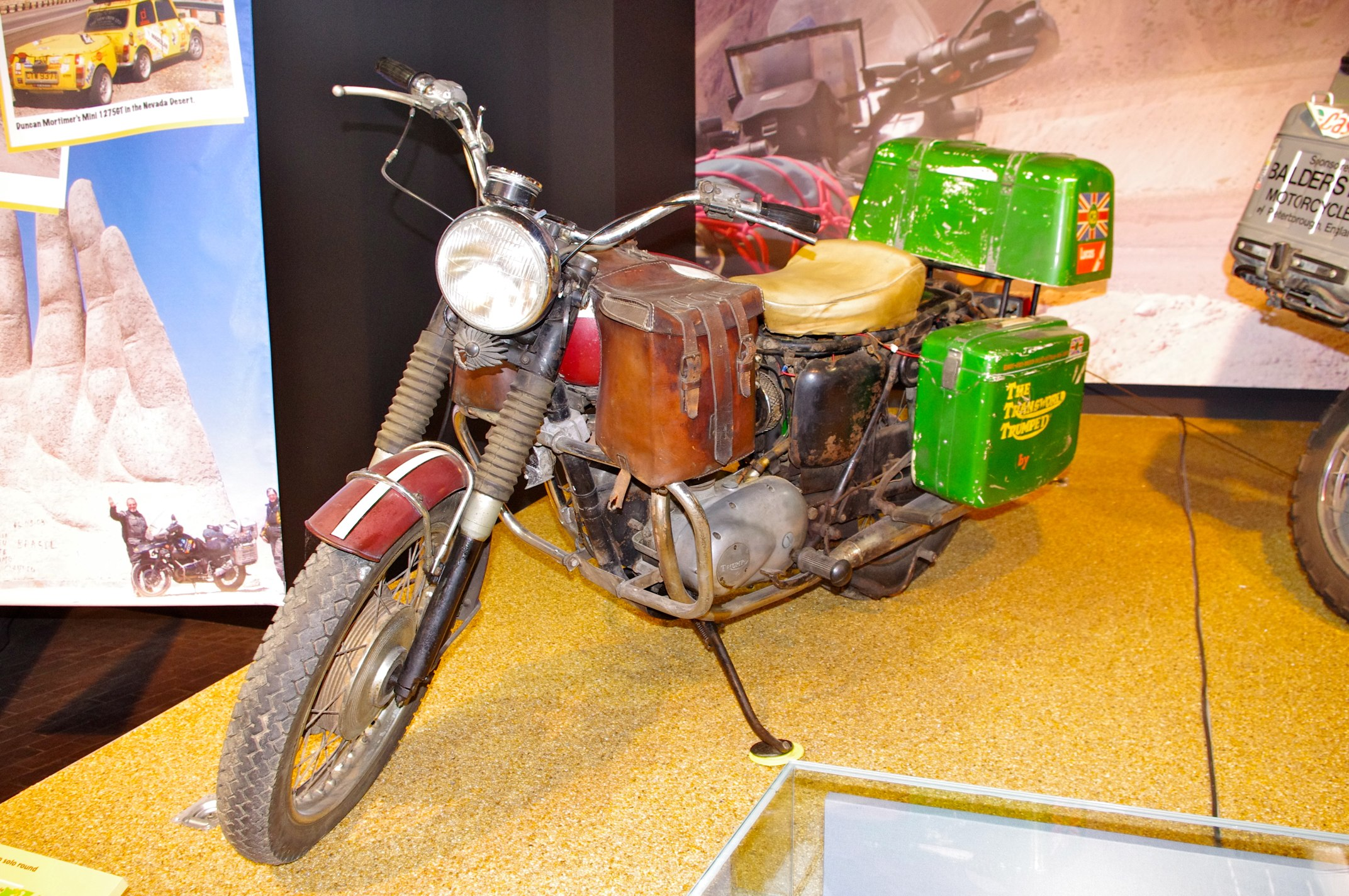
Ted Simon's Triumph Tiger 100 "Jupiter"

- Carl Stearns Clancy, the first motorcyclist to circle the globe, in 1912/13.
- Dave Barr — Vietnam veteran who became the first double-amputee to circumnavigate the world on a motorcycle
- Ewan McGregor and Charley Boorman — riding for the books and TV series Long Way Round, Long Way Down, and Long Way Up
- Simon and Monika Newbound — world record for motorcycle endurance
- Neil Peart — drummer of rock band Rush, who undertook a long-distance ride from his home in Quebec, Canada, across Canada to Alaska and then down to Mexico and Belize after the deaths of his daughter and wife—a ride that was later documented in the book Ghost Rider: Travels on the Healing Road
- Paul Pelland — riding to raise money for multiple sclerosis charities
- Max Reisch - Austrian motorcyclist and long distance traveler, reaching 1933 India the first time overland
- Benka Pulko — Slovenian motorcyclist who holds two Guinness World Records for her 5.5 year, 7 continent trip
- Nick Sanders — Guinness World Record for fastest circumnavigation of the world by motorcycle in 1997
- Kevin and Julia Sanders — broke Nick Sanders' record in 2002 and broke the record for the Pan American Highway in 2003
- Ted Simon — 64,000-mile (103,000 km) ride through 45 countries was documented in his books Jupiter's Travels and Riding High
- Kane Avellano — Guinness World Record for youngest person to circumnavigate the world by motorcycle (solo and unsupported) at the age of 23 in 2017.
- Wendy Crockett - First woman to win the Iron Butt Rally and, together with Australian long distance rider Ian McPhee, Guinness World Record holder for the longest motorcycle journey in a single country by a team. The world record ride is documented in their book, Pushing Miles: A Chronicle of Motorcycles, Mayhem, and Mettle.

== See also ==
- Long-distance horse riding
