= Famous and Fearless =

Television series

- Genre: Reality game show
- Presented by: Chris Evans
- Voices of: Nick Fellows
- Country of origin: United Kingdom
- Original language: English
- No. of series: 1
- No. of episodes: 6

Production
- Running time: 95–120 minutes
- Production company: Princess Productions

Original release
- Network: Channel 4
- Release: 2 January – 7 January 2011

Famous and Fearless is a reality game show series in which 8 celebrities compete in extreme sporting events to win money for their respective chosen charity. It aired in January 2011 on Channel 4 and was presented by Chris Evans and Clare Balding with Jack Osbourne appearing alongside them as a guest in most shows. The commentator of the events was Nick Fellows. The winner was Charley Boorman. The live part of Famous and Fearless was broadcast from the Liverpool Echo Arena, where all the Head-to-Heads and other events happened before an arena audience.

== Celebrities ==
Eight celebrities competed, split into two divisions – boys and girls. On 7 January 2011, Charley Boorman won the boys' group and Kelly Holmes won the girls, with the former becoming the overall champion.

Celebrity	Known for
Charley Boorman	Actor and TV adventurer, presenter of By Any Means, Race to Dakar, Long Way Round and Long Way Down
Jenny Frost	Singer, former member of Atomic Kitten and presenter of Snog Marry Avoid?, former I'm a Celebrity...Get Me Out of Here! contestant
Jonah Lomu	Former rugby union footballer for the All Blacks from New Zealand
Kacey Ainsworth	Actress, played Little Mo Slater in EastEnders
Dame Kelly Holmes	Olympic gold medallist
Rufus Hound	Comedian and TV personality, winner of Let's Dance for Sport Relief
Sam Branson	Son of entrepreneur and Virgin Group owner Richard Branson
Sarah Jayne Dunn	Actress, played Mandy Richardson in Hollyoaks

== Events ==
Day 1

- BMX (Boys)
- Streetluge (Girls)
- Car Flip (Head to Head)

Day 2

- Mini Moto (Girls)
- Powerboat (Boys)
- Monster Truck Assault Course (Head to Head)

Day 3

- Inline speed skating (Boys)
- Hovercraft (Girls)
- Demolition Derby (Head to Head)

Day 4

- Power Skateboarding (Girls)
- Enduro (Boys)
- Car Crash Dominoes (Head to Head)

Day 5

- Karting (Boys)
- Abseil (Girls)
- Car Jump (Head to Head)

Day 6 (Finale)

- Powerbocking (Girls)
- Dirt Buggy (Boys)
- Demolition Derby (Head to Head)

Charley Boorman beat Dame Kelly Holmes in Demolition Derby to become the eventual winner of Famous And Fearless.

== Reception ==
Famous and Fearless received mostly negative reviews from British media outlets. Stuart Heritage of The Guardian stated that the contestants were not celebrities and the events were not extreme. He went on to say Celebrity Big Brother's successor may have been more successful if it had been 'a mindless Saturday evening ITV show.'. The Independent claimed the show was too noisy and mislead viewers with its title, suggesting 'Vaguely Recognisable and Game for a Laugh' or 'Who's That and Why Is That Dangerous?' as more fitting titles.

== Ratings ==
Episode	Date	Rating (Millions)
Episode 1	2 January 2011	2.27
Episode 2	3 January 2011	1.73
Episode 3	4 January 2011	1.63
Episode 4	5 January 2011	1.70
Episode 5	6 January 2011	1.30
Episode 6	7 January 2011	1.44

== Cancellation ==
In February 2011, it was reported that the series had been axed after one series due to poor ratings.
