= Biking For Barnardos =

2008 motorcycle circumnavigation of the world

- Date: 14 June 2008 – 4 October 2008
- Location: Worldwide (start/finish in Morecambe, England)
- Cause: Barnardos
- Participants: Kurtis Murphy, David Snelling

Biking For Barnardos was a motorcycle circumnavigation of the world in aid of the children's charity Barnardos, undertaken by Kurtis Murphy and David Snelling in 2008.

== Overview ==
Beginning on 14 June 2008, Murphy and Snelling set off from the statue of Eric Morecambe in Morecambe, Lancashire, England, to circumnavigate the globe by motorcycle. Their route passed through France, Belgium, the Netherlands, Germany, Poland, the Czech Republic, Slovakia, Ukraine, Russia, Kazakhstan, Mongolia, and the United States. They returned to Morecambe on 4 October 2008, completing the journey in under four months.

The trip was inspired by Ted Simon's book Jupiter's Travels and Ewan McGregor and Charley Boorman's journey Long Way Round. Their path was similar to that of Long Way Round, but undertaken without a support crew or major sponsorship.

== Bikes ==
Snelling and Murphy rode identical Suzuki V-Strom 650 motorcycles fitted with standard luggage. Due to budget constraints, no off-road tires were used during the journey.
