= Motorcycle touring =

Tourism by motorcycle, often over longer distance

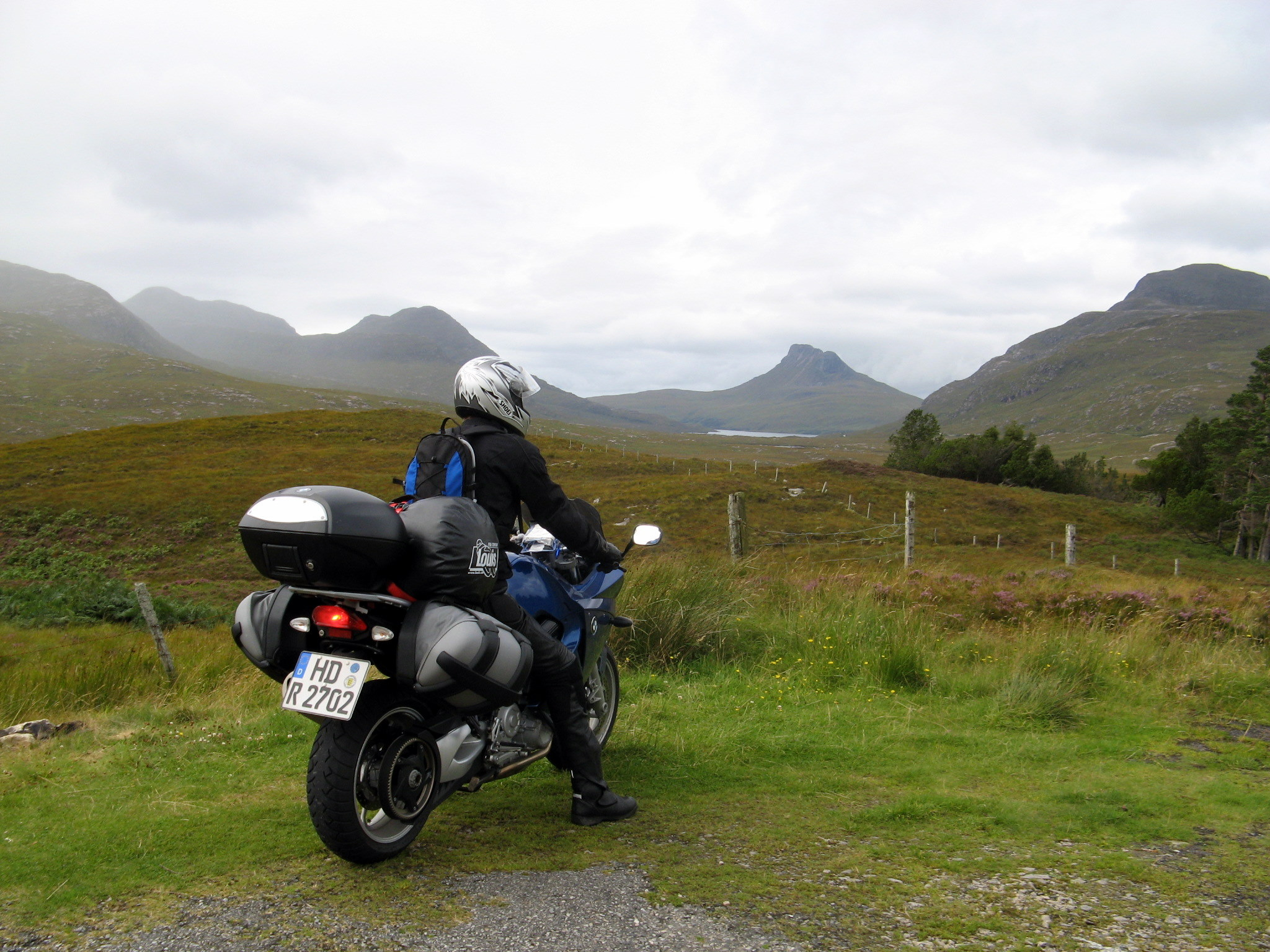
Motorcycle touring in Great Britain

Motorcycle touring is a format of tourism that involves a motorcycle. It has been a subject of note since at least 1915.

Motorcycle touring involves special equipment and techniques. A touring motorcycle optimized for long range travel and luggage carrying capacity may be used. Special preparations involved include route planning for unfamiliar areas, packing tools that might be needed, finding food, making overnight stops, finding fuel in remote areas, and physical care of the rider's body. It may involve camping or attending motorcycle rallies along the way.

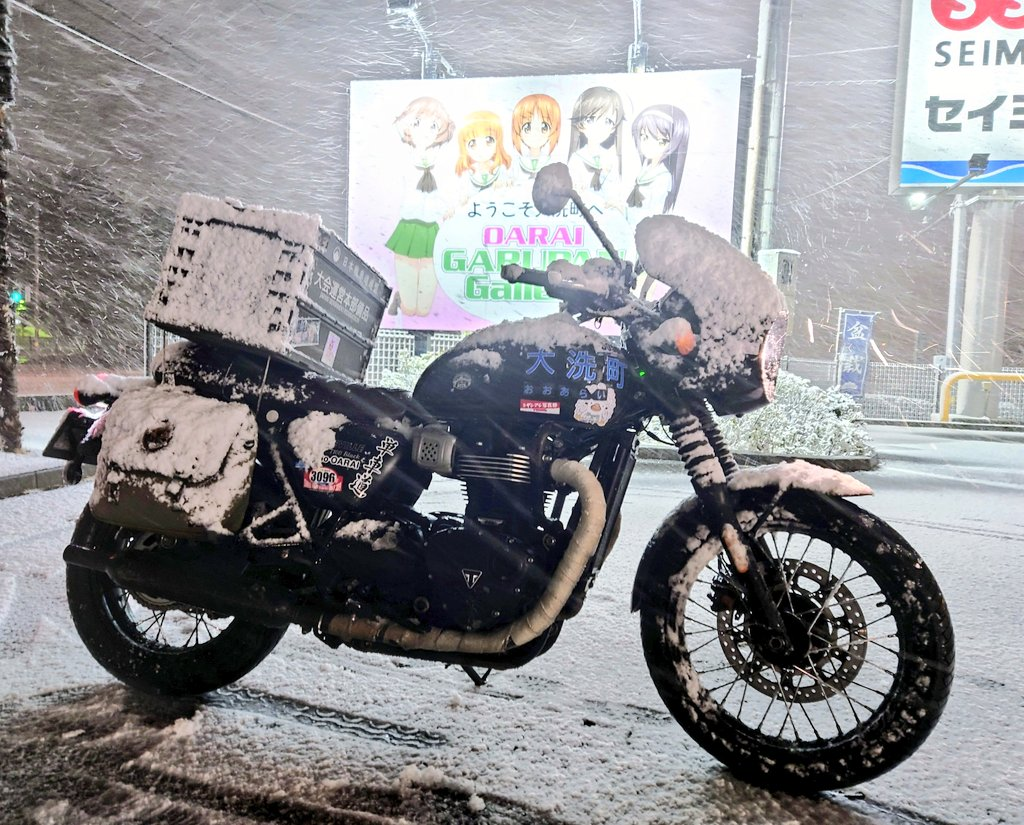
Triumph Bonneville in Ōarai town covered in snow

Some riders take touring to extremes with rides of thousands to over 100,000 miles or kilometers, and lasting years or decades (see Long-distance motorcycle riding and List of long-distance motorcycle riders). These long-distance riders may also join specialized societies such as the German Globetrotter Club and publish. Some notable works concerning such tours include The Gasoline Tramp or Around the World on a Motorcycle by Carl Stearns Clancy; India: The Shimmering Dream and other works by Max Reisch; The Motorcycle Diaries by Che Guevara; Fastest Man Around the World and other works by Nick Sanders; Jupiter's Travels by Ted Simon; Riding the Edge and Riding the Ice book and video by Dave Barr; Motorcycle Touring by Peter Thoeming and Peter Rae; the film Sjaak the World and the book Life on 2 wheels written by Sjaak Lucassen; the Long Way Round and Long Way Down book and television series by Ewan McGregor and Charley Boorman; and Ghost Rider: Travels on the Healing Road by Neil Peart.

Motorcycle touring supports a large amount of commerce, not only the sale of motorcycles but also substantial amounts of equipment. Riding suits alone can cost thousands of dollars. By a 2014 estimate, over 40% of all street motorcycles sold in the United States were touring models. Some companies cater to tourists who need to rent a motorcycle. One mass-market magazine in the US, Roadrunner Motorcycle Touring & Travel is devoted to motorcycle touring as is Australian Motorcyclist Magazine in Australia. Brokers offers "motorcycle cruising", in which they arrange to bring owners with their bikes on board a cruise ship from the United States to the Caribbean Islands, handling the requisite legal paperwork to ride in Bermuda and elsewhere.

Starting in 2018, Chicago-based Twisted Road and Los Angeles–based Riders Share offer peer-to-peer motorcycle rentals, allowing motorcycle self-tours nationally in the U.S.

== Growth and popularity ==
Motorcycle touring has seen significant growth. This can be attributed to several factors, including:

- The rise of adventure touring: There's a growing interest in exploring remote destinations and experiencing the thrill of challenging terrains on a motorcycle.
- Increased accessibility: Advancements in motorcycle technology, touring gear, and the availability of well-maintained touring routes have made motorcycle touring more accessible to riders of all experience levels.
- Growth of motorcycle touring companies: The industry has witnessed a boom in companies catering to motorcycle touring enthusiasts. These companies offer a variety of guided tours, ranging from luxurious road trips to off-road expeditions, accommodating different experience levels and tour styles.

Motorcycle touring is a rapidly growing segment within the motorcycle industry. Several companies worldwide specialize in organizing motorcycle tours, offering a diverse range of experiences.

== See also ==
- Bicycle touring
- Pleasure riding
- Trail riding
- Overlanding
- Trekking
