= Claudio von Planta =

Swiss cinematographer

- Born: 16 September 1962 (age 63)
- Citizenship: Switzerland
- Education: Zurich University
- Occupations: Cameraman, director and editor
- Years active: 1985-present
- Website: www.vonplanta.net

Claudio von Planta (born 16 September 1962) is a Swiss cameraman, director and filmmaker, based in London.

== Projects ==
=== Long Way Round ===
His best known work is as the cameraman who accompanied Ewan McGregor and Charley Boorman on their Long Way Round motorcycle journey eastward from London to New York in 2004, Long Way Down from Scotland to South Africa in 2007, Long Way Up from Ushuaia to Los Angeles in 2019, and Long Way Home through Europe in 2025.

Shortly before the 2004 trip Planta discovered his motorbike licence was invalid for the journey. He subsequently failed his bike test the day before the team was due to leave. He remained in London and retook the test two weeks later, eventually flying out to join up with the team in Prague, the capital of the Czech Republic.

Planta would often ride far ahead of the other two in order to film them going past, or trail behind getting the shots he wanted. He suffered a couple of bad falls on the journey. At one point in Mongolia his bike took such a battering it had to be sent ahead for repairs and a replacement bike was purchased by McGregor and Boorman.

In 2006, he linked up again with Boorman and Russ Malkin as the director of photography for Race to Dakar, a documentary chronicling the team's attempt at the Dakar Rally. In 2007, he reprised his role as cameraman on Long Way Down. He again suffered an accident on the trip, coming off and damaging the bodywork on his bike after narrowly avoiding Boorman who was rapidly slowing down on a motorway in South Africa. In 2019, he joined McGregor, Boorman, and Malkin once again for Long Way Up, riding from the southern tip of South America, all the way through Central America, to Los Angeles.

=== Racing Green ===
Racing Green Endurance (RGE) was a student-led project at Imperial College London to demonstrate the potential of zero emission cars. The team drove 26,000 kilometres (16,000 mi) in 136 days down the Pan-American Highway starting in July 2010 in northern Alaska all the way down to Argentina in an open-top electric sportscar, which was filmed by Planta as eight 22-minute episodes for the BBC World News channel.

== Other career ==
After leaving the Swiss Army in 1982, Planta studied political science at the University of Zurich. He sold his first film in 1985 and has continued to build his portfolio of work since then. He has filmed in locations as diverse as war zones, terrorist training camps and the Pfizer UK marketing conference. He spent a month in prison in Pakistan for crossing the border illegally. He related a brief version of the story on the DVD release of Long Way Round while discussing the inability of the Swiss embassy to help its citizens.

In October 2007, Planta filmed Hull Freedom Trail, a 5,000-mile (8,000 km) road journey from Hull, England to Freetown, Sierra Leone undertaken by a group of five 4x4 vehicles. The vehicles were to be donated to charity projects working in Freetown to reunite families torn apart by the years of civil war in the country, and attempting to raise awareness of modern slavery/human trafficking issues.

== Filmography ==
- Chasing the Jet Stream
- Racing Green Endurance
- By Any Means
- Commando Chaplains
- Young Entrepreneur Awards 2008
- Hull Freedom Trail
- British Army TV Adverts
- Long Way Down
- Forced Repatriation
- Alcohol Smuggling into Iran
- Words of Warriors
- Blood on the Stone
- The Thin Blue Line (Documentary)
- Himalayan Expedition
- Guns for Hire - Congo DRC
- UNICEF Stop Aids Campaign
- Guns for Hire - Afghanistan
- Neils Excellent Adventure
- Pakistan on the Tightrope
- Living with Aids
- Rape Trade
- Right to the Edge: Sydney to Tokyo By Any Means
- Surviving Sudan (Living with Refugees)
- Long Way Round
- Saddam's Legacy
- War Widows
- Fighting by the Rules
- Saddam's Secret Time-Bomb
- The Saudi Tapes
- The Cuba Connection
- Karzan's Brothers - Escape from the Safe Haven
- Rebels of the Forgotten World
- Minefield Casualty
- African Railway
- Long Way Up
- Long Way Home
