= By Any Means =

By Any Means may refer to:

- By Any Means (2008 TV series), a BBC documentary television series
- By Any Means (2013 TV series), a BBC crime television series
- Right to the Edge: Sydney to Tokyo by Any Means also known as By Any Means 2, a 2009 adventure series
- By Any Means (mixtape), a mixtape by rapper Kevin Gates
- By Any Means, a 2025 album by Indo-Canadian rapper Sukha
- By Any Means (2016 film), an American thriller film
- By Any Means (2026 film), an American historical crime thriller film

== See also ==
- By any means necessary (disambiguation)
