= Simon Pavey =

Australian motorcycle racer

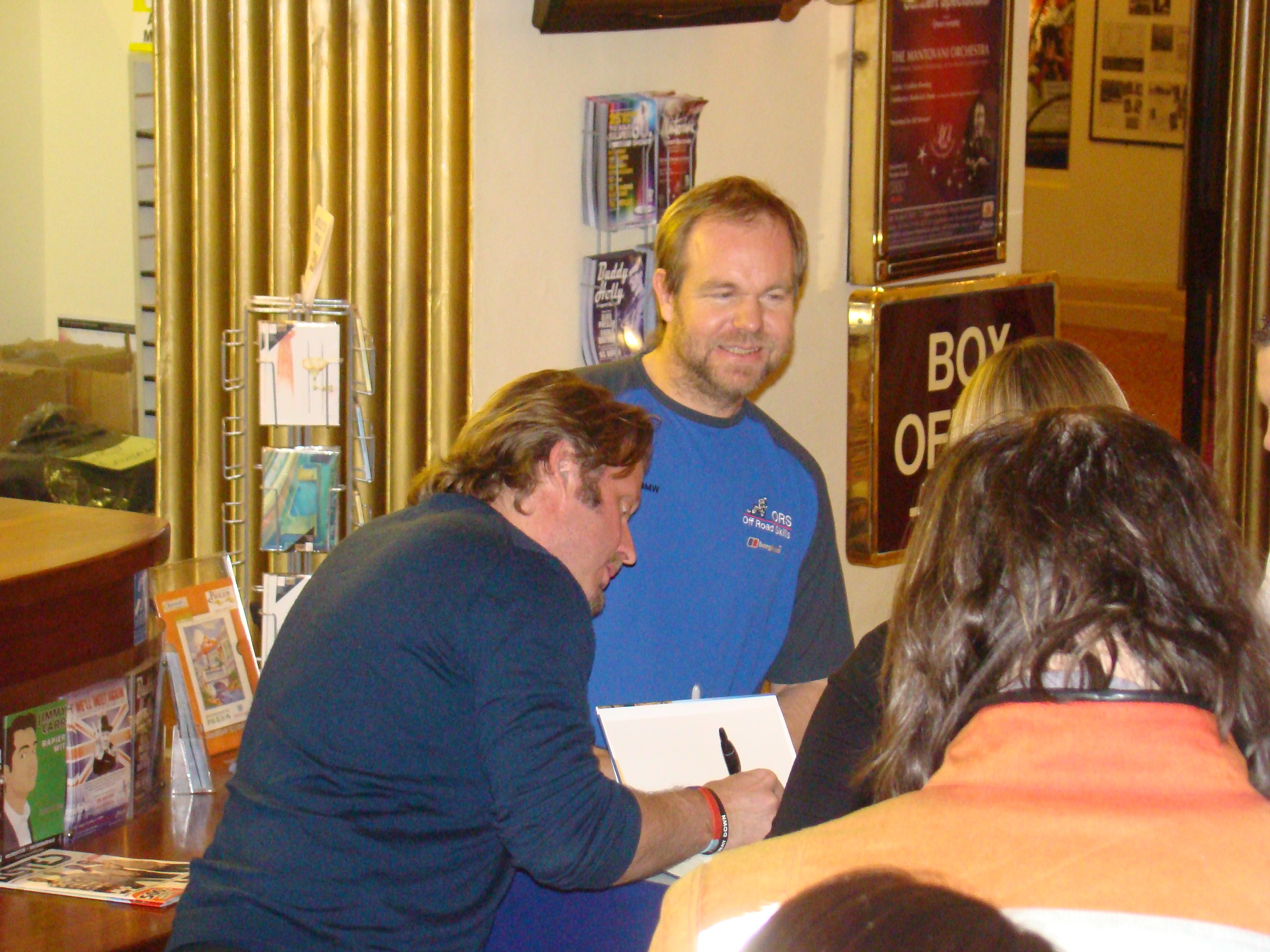
Simon Pavey (standing) with Charley Boorman at a book signing event

Simon Pavey (born 4 April 1967 in Sydney, Australia) is a motorcycle enduro and off-road racer, currently based in Wales.

Pavey started his racing career in Sydney in 1981 with a motocross race in Appin and won his first race at the same circuit that year. He has since competed in numerous rally events worldwide including the Dakar Rally ten times, completing it seven times (including his first attempt in 1998). He gained recognition when he first trained Ewan McGregor and Charley Boorman in off-road motorcycle riding for the TV series Long Way Round and then trained Boorman again to race off-road and compete in the Dakar Rally in 2006 for the TV series Race to Dakar. During the event, Boorman retired due to injury and Pavey went on to complete the race finishing in 86th position, his worst performance., and has high as 50th position in 1990. In 2015, Pavey and his son Llewelyn formed the first father-son team to not only attempt Dakar, but also to finish.

Pavey competed in the Transorientale Rally in 2008. The rally started in St Petersburg on 12 June and finished in Beijing on 28 June 2008. He placed 18th in the moto/quad division, with a final time of 53 hours, 51 minutes.

Pavey manages the BMW Motorrad off-road training facility in South Wales, where he teaches motorcyclists to ride off-road.

== Racing achievements ==
- 1988 New South Wales Hare Scramble Champion
- 1989 Number one enduro rider in Japan
- 1997 Finished First African Rally - Atlas Rally
- 1998 Finished First Dakar Rally
- 2004 Winner of the Great Britain Hare Scrambles Veteran Class
- 2008 Transorientale - 18th

=== Dakar Rally results ===
Year	Bike	Position
1998	(Japan) Honda	40
1999	(United Kingdom) CCM	50
2005	(Germany) BMW	78
2006	(Germany) BMW	86
2009	(Germany) BMW G 650 Xchallenge	68
2011	(Germany) BMW G450X	71
2013	(Sweden) Husqvarna TE 449	59
2015	(Austria) KTM 450 Rally Replica	72
