= Ujunglero =

Ujung Lero
- Town
- Nickname: Lero
- Location within Sulawesi
- Coordinates: 4°2′33″S 119°35′48″E
- Country: Indonesia
- Province: South Sulawesi
- Regency: Pinrang
- Time zone: UTC+8 (+8)

Ujung Lero is a town on the south-west coast of Sulawesi, Indonesia. A fishing port, the locals are skilled craftsmen in making boats and fishing. English explorer Charley Boorman visited Ujung Lero as part the televisions series Right to the Edge: Sydney to Tokyo By Any Means in 2009.
