= Jamie Lowther-Pinkerton =

British Army officer

Jamie Lowther-Pinkerton LVO MBE DL
- Born: Anthony James Moxon Lowther-Pinkerton; 28 January 1960 (age 66); Alderton, Suffolk, England
- Occupations: Equerry to Queen Elizabeth the Queen Mother (1984–1986), Private Secretary to the Duke and Duchess of Cambridge and to Prince Harry (2005–2013)
- Spouse: Susannah Richards
- Children: 4

Anthony James Moxon Lowther-Pinkerton, LVO, MBE, DL (born 28 September 1960) is the former Private Secretary to the Duke and Duchess of Cambridge and to Prince Harry. He was appointed on 2 May 2005 and resigned as full-time Private Secretary with effect from September 2013, remaining for a single day a week in order to mentor and advise the younger staff who succeeded him.

From 1979 to 1998, he was an officer in the British Army. He served with the Irish Guards and the Special Air Service (SAS), including in the first Gulf War, and in Colombia and the Balkans.

He is godfather to Prince George.

== Biography ==
=== Early life ===
Brought up in Alderton, Suffolk, he is descended from the Lowther landed gentry family, and shares a descent from the 1st Earl of Bessborough with his royal employers. He was educated at Eton College.

His first career was in the British Army. He trained at the Royal Military Academy, Sandhurst in 1979, and joined the Irish Guards. Lowther-Pinkerton served with the 1st Battalion Irish Guards, but was attached to the Special Air Service (SAS) throughout his 20-year army career. He retired from the Army in 1998.

=== Career ===
Lowther-Pinkerton served as Equerry to Queen Elizabeth the Queen Mother 1984–1986, and was promoted to captain on 8 June 1986. He was a troop commander of the SAS as a Captain. He served in the first Gulf War in 1990–1991 as Special Forces Liaison Officer with United States forces.

Lowther-Pinkerton was promoted to the rank of major on 30 September 1992, and was in charge of two 20-man SAS counter-narcotics operations in Colombia for two years in the early 1990s. He attended the Staff College, Camberley, and qualified as a staff officer (psc). Lowther-Pinkerton was Commanding Officer of G Squadron SAS. In the mid-to-late 1990s he was in the Balkans for the strategic policy review by the Ministry of Defence; reportedly in 1994 as part of a four-man SAS "Joint Communication Organisation" in Bosnia.

In 2001, Lowther-Pinkerton co-founded, and has since been a director of, Objective Travel Safety, which provides risk assessment training for young travellers and journalists. He trained Ewan McGregor and Charley Boorman for their Long Way Round and Long Way Down TV series. He is a part-time consultant to Kroll Risk Management, London.

Lowther-Pinkerton was appointed Member of the Royal Victorian Order (MVO) for his service as Equerry to the Queen Mother in 1986, Member of the Order of the British Empire (MBE) in 1990 for service with the special forces in Colombia, and Lieutenant of the Royal Victorian Order (LVO) in the 2013 New Year Honours. Until 2021, Lowther-Pinkerton served as a trustee for the veteran support and archaeology charity Waterloo Uncovered, which conducts excavations at the site of the Battle of Waterloo with veterans and serving personnel.

=== Personal life ===
Lowther-Pinkerton is married to Susannah Richards and has four children.
