= RIDE Adventures =

US-based travel agency

- Industry: motorcycle touring
- Founded: 2010
- Founder: Eric Lange
- Website: www.rideadv.com

RIDE Adventures is a US-based travel agency that conducts and arranges motorcycle tours and 4x4 adventure packages in South America, Europe, Africa, and the United States. The company was founded in 2010 by motorcyclist Eric Lange, who originally wanted to share the experience of motorcycling in Patagonia, a region that straddles the southern section of South America's Andes Mountains.

== History ==
After losing his job during the 2008 financial crisis, Eric Lange took a 2.5-year motorcycle trip from the northern US through Central and South America, ending in Patagonia. Impressed by the scenic views in the sparsely populated region, he founded RIDE Adventures and began serving as a guide for other interested motorcyclists.

The company soon expanded, partnering with other local motorcycle guide companies and adding more guides of its own. New routes included tours of the Patagonia region, Chile, and Brazil; the Caribbean; Peru; Bolivia; the United States; Africa; and Europe.

== Reviews ==
Rider magazine wrote of Lange that "He started RIDE Adventures to share the country he loves, and does a great job of it." The motorcycle site Thumper Talk described RIDE Adventures as doing "some of the most exciting Patagonia and Peru/Bolivia motorcycle tours we’ve encountered."
