= Tim Mayhew =

American businessman

- Born: 1970 or 1971 (age 54–55)
- Other names: "Pashnit"
- Known for: Motorcycling writing and business
- Website: pashnit.com

Tim Mayhew is an American businessperson well known for creating the pashnit.com website for motorcycle touring enthusiasts. The website, which started as a hobby in 1999 after Mayhew left U.S. Marine Corps active duty, catalogs over 250 roads, and had 75,000 to 100,000 page views per month at one point from motorcyclists, bicyclists and auto enthusiasts. Mayhew estimates he has ridden 350,000 miles (560,000 km) and taken over 100,000 photographs documenting California roads.

In 2004, after a Cycle World article about Mayhew and his website the previous year, he launched a motorcycle tour business in California. Mayhew has also appeared in print as an authority on the Suzuki Hayabusa, which he has used extensively as a tour guide.
