= Long Way Home (2025 TV series) =

Motorcycle Apple TV+ series

- The series art from AppleTV+
- Created by: Ewan McGregor; Charley Boorman; David Alexanian; Russ Malkin
- Starring: Ewan McGregor; Charley Boorman
- Country of origin: United Kingdom
- Original language: English
- No. of episodes: 10

Production
- Cinematography: Claudio von Planta; Jimmy Simak
- Running time: 36-45 minutes (per episode)

Original release
- Network: Apple TV+
- Release: 9 May – 4 July 2025

Related
- Long Way Round; Race to Dakar; Long Way Down; By Any Means; Long Way Up

Long Way Home is a British series documenting the 63-day journey from the United Kingdom across Scandinavia and Eastern and Central Europe made by Ewan McGregor and Charley Boorman on refurbished vintage motorcycles. The series premiered on Apple TV+ on 9 May 2025. This is the fourth journey the two have made for television, beginning with Long Way Round (2004) which was followed by Long Way Down (2007) and Long Way Up (2020).

== Premise ==
=== Trip details ===
The riders started at Ewan McGregor's home in Perthshire, Scotland and returned to Charley Boorman's home in Suffolk, England. From the United Kingdom, they rode across Europe for a cumulative distance of about 10,000 miles (16,100 km). The trip included about 17 countries.

Their route included a trip across the English Channel to Denmark and then across the North Sea to Scandinavia.

=== Motorcycles ===
Apple describes their motorcycles as "cranky old bikes." McGregor rode a 1974 Moto Guzzi Eldorado 850 police bike; Boorman rode a BMW R75/5 with a kickstarter. As with the Long Way Up, the support team drove all-electric Rivians.

== Episodes ==
Contents below are adapted from Apple TV+.

Episode	Original airdate	Synopsis
1	9 May 2025	Ewan and Charley makes plans to go through Europe on their fourth filmed trip. They celebrate the 20th anniversary of their first show, with producers David Alexanian and Russ Malkin in Manchester. They prepare their motorcycles and work out their route. They are given a musical sendoff by McGregor's school pipe band, and ride onto the ferry for Amsterdam.
2	9 May 2025	Ewan and Charley cross the English Channel on a ferry, and tour the Netherlands and Germany, including a visit to Charley's mother's hometown. They then head to the Danish islands.
3	16 May 2025	Ewan's bike falls out from underneath him in Denmark, but they continue to Sweden where a Swedish biker club helps them keep going. They visit UNICEF's distribution center, in their roles as UNICEF ambassadors.
4	23 May 2025	The friends visit Norway, riding through the snow covered fjords and seeing castles. They enjoy Viking churches and ancient rock formations.
5	30 May 2025	Ewan and Charley fly to Svalbard to see the damage from climate change. They learn about renewable energy, and reindeer deaths attributed to the changing climate.
6	6 June 2025	Ewan and Charley leave Norway for Sweden, where they set up camp in a bug infested forest. They continue touring Sweden's forests. Ewan's bike starts to backfire, and he tries to fix it. They visit a drag racing strip. After one more night of camping, they head into Finland to visit the Lapland forest. They stay in a tree house, and later enjoy some water sports and musical instruments in the forest.
7	13 June 2025	Ewan and Charley continue through rainy Finland, visiting the Silent Art installation and trying their hand at logrolling. They visit the Russian border, and camp on an island in Lake Saimaa. The continue to Helsinki, where they cook a meal for their families. They board the ferry to Tallinn, Estonia. The episode ends with Ewan's motorcycle continuing to backfire, requiring service.
8	20 June 2025	Still in Estonia, Ewan's bike requires service after breaking down. They take the bike to a service shop, where an electrical problem is fixed after several attempts. They then head to the sparsely populated island of Kihnu, to visit a woman's colony and enjoy several meals with the residents. They board the return ferry and drive to Latvia. They visit a bodsled track along the way, and continue along through Riga to Lithuania. They visit a Motoball club along the way. They take a detour to look for amber along the beach, and finish their day with a stay at a Lithuanian castle and a hot air balloon ride.
9	27 June 2025	Ewan and Charley leave Lithuania and head into Poland. They visit Bialystock, and take a walking tour. They then head to Warsaw and separate for solo walking tours. They then visit a local UNICEF family center, supporting Ukrainian refugees displaced by the Russian Ukraine war. They continue to Krakow and visit a castle along the way. They explore Krakow the next day, and get tattoos. They play some vintage pinball machines, and head for the Tatra Mountains in southern Poland the next day. They are welcomed at a Polish home by costumed locals, who teach them shepherd culture. The next day, they ride into Slovakia and revisit Bojnice Castle, with fellow show creators Dave and Russ.
10	4 July 2025	In the season finale, the boys visit Vienna, Austria, where they stop in at a local coffee shop for coffee and pastries. They ride into the Austrian Alps for the premier of a new opera. They then drive into Switzerland, and go paragliding. They visit an artist's castle in the mountains, and visit cameraman Claudio Von Planta's house. They play a round of Hornussen "farmer's golf" and leave Switzerland. They drive through France to the port of Calais, stopping in Reims along the way to visit the cathedral. They return to England on the Chunnel train, and reunite with their families at Charley's English home. The next day, Ewan returns to his home in Scotland.

== Reception ==
The Guardian gave the series three out of five stars, calling the series a bit slow and with too many episodes, but that it was ultimately entrancing watching the co-stars, calling it perfectly pleasant. The series was also noted for the leads' easygoing charm and personal rapport. Pop culture website Decider also recommended the programme, noting the scenic shots and relationship between the two leads. Benji Wilson for The Daily Telegraph gave the programme two out of five stars, writing that “Ewan and Charley’s boys’ tour is certainly fun; mostly makes you want to get off your sofa and get out there, which is probably not what the programme makers wanted. But there’s always a slight sense that we’re the ones being taken for a ride.” The programme was also nominated in 2025 as one of the best travel/adventure shows in the 7th Critics Choice Association Real TV category, losing to eventual winner Conan O'Brien Must Go.

== See also ==
- List of long-distance motorcycle riders
