= The Serpent's Kiss =

- Theatrical release poster
- Directed by: Philippe Rousselot
- Written by: Tim Rose Price
- Starring: Ewan McGregor; Greta Scacchi; Pete Postlethwaite
- Music by: Goran Bregović
- Distributed by: Guerilla Films
- Release date: 14 May 1997 (Cannes)
- Running time: 104 minutes
- Country: United Kingdom
- Language: English

The Serpent's Kiss is a 1997 British romantic drama film directed by Philippe Rousselot. Set in late-17th-century England, it tells the story of a Dutch garden architect, Meneer Chrome (Ewan McGregor), who has been hired by a wealthy merchant (Pete Postlethwaite) to create an extravagant garden. The film also stars Greta Scacchi and Richard E. Grant.

The film was entered into the 1997 Cannes Film Festival. To date, it is the only feature directed by Rousselot, who usually works as cinematographer.

== Plot ==
Thomas Smithers (Postlethwaite), who has made his fortune as an ironmonger and cannon-maker, hires the famous Meneer Chrome (McGregor) to create the most extravagant garden imaginable on his overgrown property. Smithers doesn't know that his wife's cousin Fitzmaurice (Grant) has already hired Chrome, with the goal of bankrupting Smithers and essentially acquiring Juliana, whom he loves. Juliana, however, is attracted to Chrome and he in turn to the Smithers' daughter, Anna, who filters all experiences through a volume of Andrew Marvell's poems that she is never without. Her parents, thinking her mentally unstable, subject her to numerous "treatments" that prompt Chrome's compassion.

As the garden grows increasingly complex and Smithers approaches bankruptcy, Fitzmaurice realizes that Chrome's affection for Anna makes him a liability; he threatens to reveal some damaging information about Chrome and then decides to kill him, but his plan backfires and Fitzmaurice dies. Juliana decides to remain loyal to her husband, now bankrupt from his obsession with the garden project. Chrome, revealed as an imposter (the assistant to the actual Chrome), goes to the sea with Anna, where she throws away her book of poetry.

== Cast ==
- Ewan McGregor as Meneer Chrome
- Greta Scacchi as Juliana
- Pete Postlethwaite as Thomas Smithers
- Richard E. Grant as James Fitzmaurice
- Carmen Chaplin as Thea / Anna
- Donal McCann as Physician
- Charley Boorman as Secretary
- Gerard McSorley as Mr. Galmoy
- Britta Smith as Mrs. Galmoy
- Susan Fitzgerald as Mistress Clevely
- Pat Laffan as Pritchard
- Rúaidhrí Conroy as Physician's Assistant
- Henry King as Lead Reaper

== Locations ==
Most of the film was shot in the County Clare village of Sixmilebridge and in Mount Ievers Court, the Republic of Ireland.

== Legacy ==
This film marks the start of Charley Boorman and Ewan McGregor's long running friendship that would eventually lead to their trip around the world: Long Way Round and is referenced in the documentary.
