= David Alexanian =

American director and producer (born 1967)

David Alexanian (born December 10, 1967) is an American director and producer.

== Career ==
In 2004, Alexanian directed and produced Long Way Round, which followed Ewan McGregor and Charley Boorman on a 20,000-mile (32,000-kilometre) motorcycle journey from London to New York, through Europe, Kazakhstan, Mongolia, Siberia, far eastern Russia and North America.

In 2009 Alexanian produced The Way with Emilio Estevez Estevez and Alexanian assembled an independent film crew and a small group of actors to travel across the north of Spain along The Camino de Santiago. The film starred Martin Sheen, Deborah Kara Unger, James Nesbitt and Yorick Van Wageningen as misfits who find each other and themselves during their trek together along the ancient Spanish route called El Camino or The Way of Saint James. The film went on to premiere at the Toronto Film Festival in 2010 and was released in 2011.

In 2021 the TV series Long Way Up was nominated for the Outstanding Travel, Adventure and Nature Program Emmy award.

In 2025, the fourth iteration of his long spanning motorcycle series collaboration with McGregor and Boorman, Long Way Home, was nominated as one of the best travel/adventure shows in the 7th Critics Choice Association Real TV category, losing to eventual winner Conan O'Brien Must Go.

== Filmography ==
- Wake Up And Smell The Coffee (2001)
- Where the Red Fern Grows (2003)
- Long Way Round (2004)
- Long Way Down (2007)
- The Way (2010)
- Marley African Roadtrip (2011)
- Long Way Up (2020)
- Long Way Home (2025)
