= By any means necessary (disambiguation) =

By any means necessary is a phrase used by Jean-Paul Sartre and Malcolm X.

By any means necessary may also refer to:

== Music ==
- By Any Means Necessary (Gary Thomas album), 1989
- By Any Means Necessary (Pastor Troy album), 2004
- "By Any Means Necessary", a song by Bloc Party from Alpha Games, 2022

== Others ==
- "By Any Means Necessary" (Babylon 5), an episode of the television series Babylon 5
- NWA By Any Means Necessary, a professional wrestling event
- BAMN, or By Any Means Necessary, an American militant left-wing civil rights group

== See also ==
- By Any Means (disambiguation)
