= Roadrunner (magazine) =

RoadRUNNER Motorcycle Touring & Travel
- Type: Publishing
- Industry: Motorcycle touring
- Founded: 2001 by ECC
- Founder: Christian & Christa Neuhauser
- Headquarters: Clemmons, North Carolina
- Key people: Florian Neuhauser, Publisher
- Website: RoadRUNNER

RoadRUNNER is a bimonthly publication covering motorcycle touring. It is based out of Clemmons, NC, and first appeared in the bookstores in 2001. It is also available via subscription in the U.S. and Canada. Contents include coverage of tours, product reviews, and maps for the featured tour. In addition to sports, touring, cruising and dual-sport bikes, the magazine also covers vintage bikes and motor scooters. RoadRUNNER was started by Christian and Christa Neuhauser in 2001. In 2025, their son Florian took over as publisher and editor-in-chief.
