= Russ Malkin =

British television director

- Born: Russell Malkin; Greater London
- Website: http://www.bigearthtv.co.uk

Russ Malkin is a British TV producer and director, the founder of Big Earth Productions. He has created documentaries for broadcasters including BBC, ITV, Sky, National Geographic, Amazon, and Discovery, often working with high-profile personalities.

He is known for the adventure travel documentaries Long Way Round, Long Way Down, Long Way Up, and Long Way Home with actors and motorcyclists Ewan McGregor and Charley Boorman. His work also includes Prince Harry in Africa, David Beckham: For the Love of the Game, and the National Geographic documentary Fiennes: Return to the Nile.

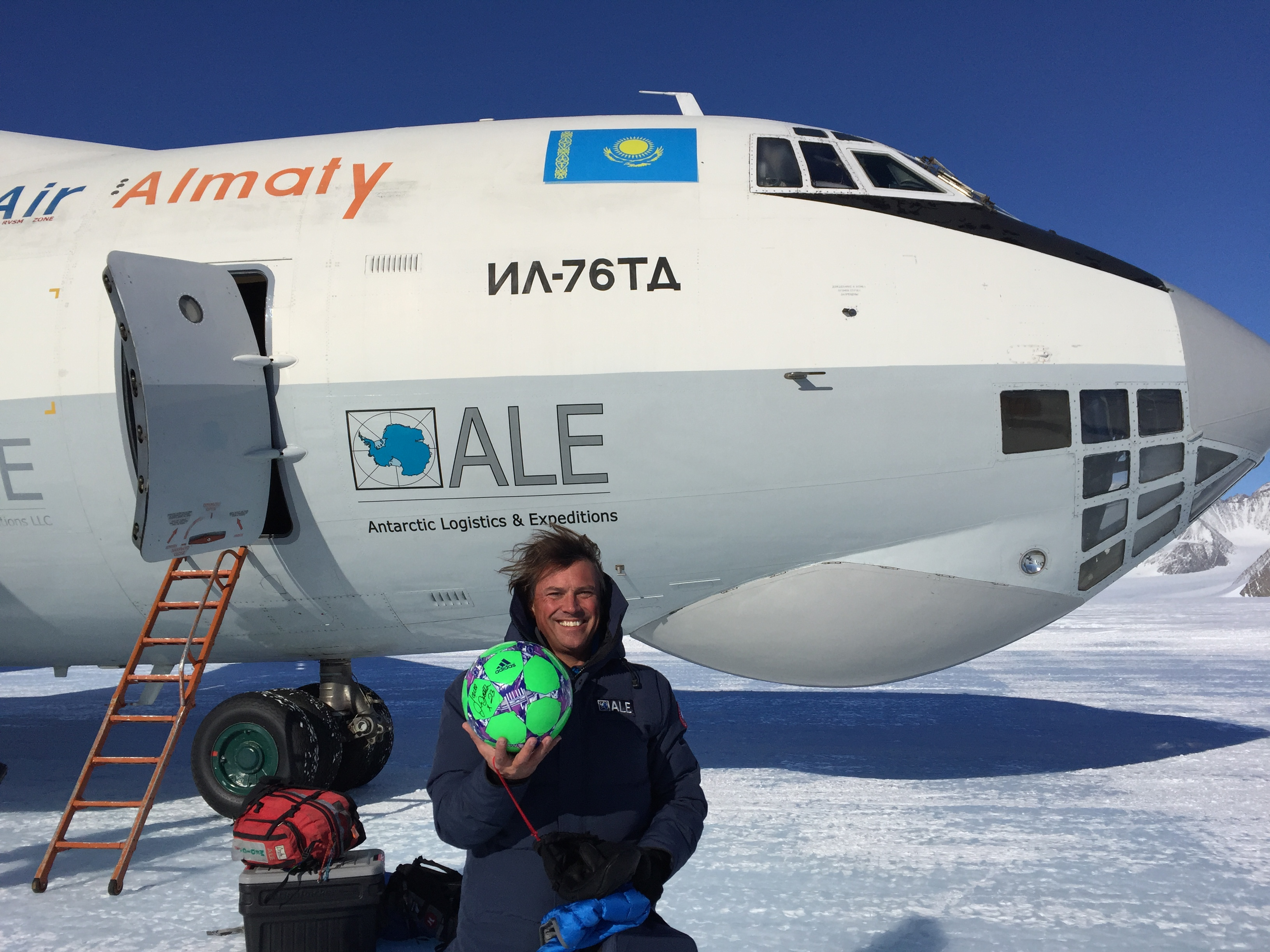
Russ Malkin filming David Beckham For The love Of The Game in Antarctica, November 2015

== Works ==
=== Prince Harry in Africa ===
In 2016, Malkin produced and directed Prince Harry in Africa following the prince's journey from Kensington Palace to Lesotho in Southern Africa to see the progress being made by his charity Sentebale, to combat HIV/AIDS. The informative and emotive documentary, featuring guest appearances from Sir Elton John, Chris Martin and Joss Stone, was produced by Big Earth for ITV.

=== David Beckham: For the Love of the Game ===
In 2015, Malkin produced and directed David Beckham For The Love Of The Game, in which David Beckham played seven football matches on seven continents in under nine days, for his UNICEF 7 Fund. The documentary features matches in the jungles of Papua New Guinea, with earthquake survivors among the historic temples of Nepal, with refugees on the desert planes of Djibouti and a game in the dangerous barrios of Buenos Aires. It also includes the unique, World's First official game of football on the isolated and inaccessible continent of Antarctica. The final game took place in front of 70,000 fans raising £1M for UNICEF. Big Earth successfully completed this major logistical undertaking to produce a 90 minute special for worldwide distribution with the BBC.

=== Fiennes: Return to the Nile ===
In 2019, Malkin was the Executive Producer for Ranulph and Joseph Fiennes’s National Geographic documentary, Fiennes: Return to the Nile. The three-part series saw the Fiennes cousins re-trace Ranulph’s expedition in Egypt back in the 1960s, including a rare chance to stay overnight in the giant pyramid of Cheops.

=== Joss Stones's Total World Tour ===
In 2015, Russ collaborated with Joss Stone and New Earth Films to follow Stone on her SE Asia tour to Malaysia, Indonesia and the Philippines. The online adventure saw Joss visit causes close to her heart.

=== Long Way series ===
Malkin is best known for producing and directing with David Alexanian a trio of travel documentaries – Long Way Round (2004), Long Way Down (2007), and Long Way Up (2020) – featuring Charley Boorman and Ewan McGregor. In each mini-series, Malkin, Alexanian, and a small camera crew accompany and provide logistical support for the two actors as they ride motorcycles on a months-long globe-spanning journey: from London to New York, from Scotland to South Africa, and from Tierra del Fuego to Los Angeles.

=== With Charley Boorman ===
Following the first Long Way series, Malkin and Boorman collaborated on several similar adventure series for TV. The format of these programmes meant that Malkin also made frequent on-screen appearances. Each series has combined social media, books, DVDs and commercial partnerships.

In 2006, Malkin produced and directed Race to Dakar, a documentary series following Charley Boorman's entry into the 2006 Dakar Rally from Lisbon to Dakar. First aired on Sky Two and ABC Television (Australia) during 2006, it was also released as a book.

In 2008 and 2009, Malkin produced and directed By Any Means and Right to the Edge: Sydney to Tokyo By Any Means for the BBC, which followed him and Boorman as they travelled from Ireland to Australia and then Australia to Japan, "by any means" of transport available, including gondolas, yachts, and elephants.

In 2011, Malkin produced and directed the Channel 5 adventure travel series Charley Boorman's Extreme Frontiers which spawned a follow-up book and DVD, Extreme Frontiers: Racing Across Canada from Newfoundland to the Rockies. The series featured Boorman undertaking extraordinary adventures through Canada, South Africa and the United States on his motorbike.

=== Other works ===
Malkin has produced and directed a number of short-form digital brand adventures, most recently featuring Henry Cavill and Anna Friel. He has also worked on other television productions including Murder or Mutiny, Britain in Motion, Ball’s in Our Court, Road Rivals (UK Travel Channel), Adventure or Luxury (Amazon Prime), Tales of Travel (CNN), the World Wakeboarding Championships and Clothes Show Live for ITV , along with World's Fittest Woman (2003).

As well as television, production and branded content, Malkin wrote his book ‘Big Earth's 101 Amazing Adventures’, published by Transworld in 2011. The book documents the must-go places and routes he has visited, for other keen adventurers to follow. During Malkin’s early career, he produced events that broke several world records including the fastest produced feature film in 1990, the largest aerobics event with the 1993 Boots’s Aerobathon as well as three world records for the indoor go-karting, outdoor go-karting and electric go-karting. He was also responsible for saving the HEMS London Air Ambulance Service after it lost its sponsor, securing sponsorship from Richard Branson who assumed the contract for the next 10 years.

He is a fellow of UNICEF and the Royal Geographical Society.
