= Patsy Quick =

Patsy Quick is an English off-road motorcycle racer, from Heathfield, East Sussex. She was the first British woman to compete in the Dakar Rally in 2003 and became the first British woman to complete it in 2006.

== Dakar Rally participation ==
In her first attempt to finish the Dakar rally, Quick was involved in a life-threatening accident which stopped her from completing the course. She was flown to a military hospital where she had her spleen removed. Her husband Clive Dredge was part of the four-person back-up team which accompanied her Dakar attempt. She was sponsored by more than a dozen organisations, including KTM who supplied her bike. She appeared in the documentary TV series Race to Dakar (Season 1, Episode 6), in which she suggested her success in 2006 had cost her more than £150,000.

== Other activities ==
Quick owns a motorcycle training club called Desert Rose Racing.
