= EagleRider =

- Founded: 1992 in Los Angeles, California
- Founder: Chris McIntyre; Peter Wurmer; Jeffrey Brown
- Key people: Sebastian Schoepe (CEO), Chris McIntyre (Co-Founder), Jeffrey Brown (Co-Founder)
- Website: www.eaglerider.com

EagleRider (EagleRider, Inc) is an American motorcycle rental and tour company. It carries lines of motorcycles including Harley-Davidson, Indian, BMW, Honda, Yamaha and more for rent and touring. The company operates from over 200 worldwide locations, leads over 100 guided and self-drive motorcycle tours including Route 66 and the Wild West, and offers one-way motorcycle rentals, luggage storage, free parking, and membership benefits. EagleRider is headquartered in Los Angeles, California.

== History ==
EagleRider was founded in 1992 by motorcycle enthusiasts Chris McIntyre, Jeffrey Brown, Peter Wurmer, and Robert Pitts. The company started with four self-purchased Harley-Davidsons, and operated out of Wurmer's garage in San Pedro, California. The company's first rental took place in 1994, with four riders from Austria, and it now provides rentals and tours in over 30 countries.

In 1997, EagleRider began franchising and opened its first international franchise in 2001. Between 2010 and 2013, EagleRider was ranked in Entrepreneur Franchise 500 three times (#309 in 2010, #202 in 2011, and #446 in 2013). In the early 2000s, EagleRider had introduced its most popular motorcycle tour through U.S. Route 66, and by 2013 had added tours in Mexico, New Zealand, Australia, the United Kingdom, and throughout Europe. In 2012, EagleRider began selling its fleet of used motorcycles, and motorcycle parts and accessories.

In 2013 (December 1, 2013) EagleRider opened its first Master Franchise in Australia with FineDays Pty Ltd and owners Will and Santina Keith. EagleRider Australia began with one Sydney location and 12 Harley-Davidson motorcycles and has grown to include locations in Brisbane, Melbourne, Noosa, Launceston and Adelaide.

In 2017, EagleRider and Harley-Davidson Motor Company announced that they had entered into an exclusive alliance. One benefit to this agreement was an expanded network of participating EagleRider locations which would allow renters to pick up a motorcycle at one location and drop it off at another.

== Competition ==
In 2018, Chicago-based Twisted Road and Los Angeles-based Riders Share started offering peer-to-peer motorcycle rentals on a national basis. In Europe main competitors are Hertz motorcycle rental and BikesBooking.
