= Ted Simon =

British journalist (born 1931)

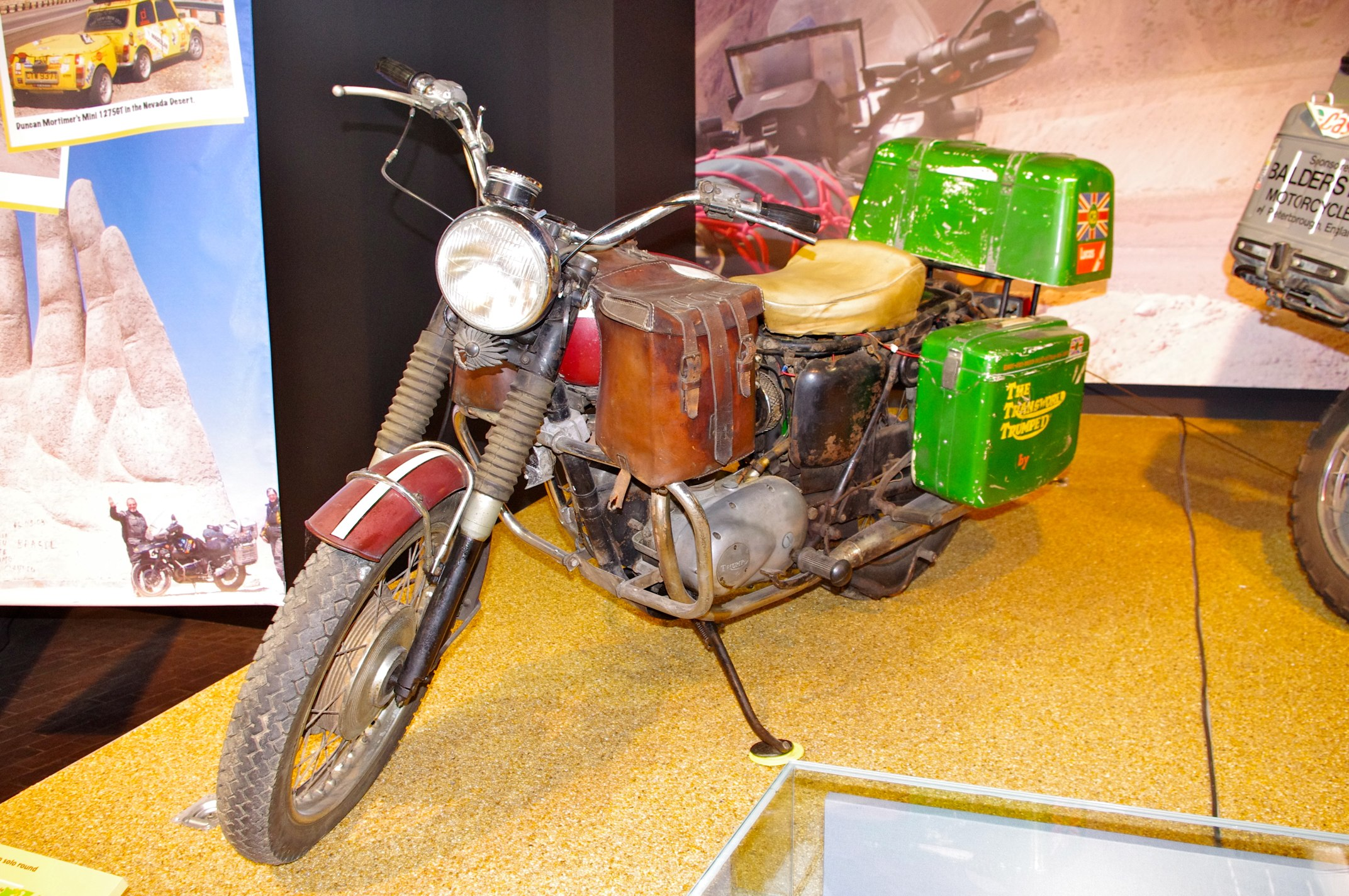
Ted Simon's Triumph Tiger 100 "Jupiter"

Ted Simon (born 1931) is a British travel writer noted for circumnavigating the world twice by motorcycle. He was raised in London by a German mother and a Romanian father.

== Early career ==
After studying chemical engineering at Imperial College he began his newspaper career in Paris with the Continental Daily Mail. Back in England, whilst undertaking National Service with the RAF he founded Scramble, a magazine for recruits, which caught the attention of Arthur Christiansen, redoubtable editor of the Daily Express, and worked in Fleet Street for ten years. He eventually became Features Editor of the Daily Sketch, and shortly before that paper was amalgamated with the Daily Mail in 1964 he left to found and edit a man's magazine, King, which survived for three years. He moved to France and contributed to various English newspapers and magazines, including The Observer and Nova. His first book, The Chequered Year, or "Grand Prix Year" (U.S. 1972), was an account of the 1970 Formula One season.

== First circumnavigation ==
In late 1973, sponsored by The Sunday Times, Simon began travelling around the world on a 500 cc Triumph Tiger 100 motorcycle. For four years he travelled over 64,000 miles (103,000 km) through 45 countries. Most accounts from his trip are detailed in his book, Jupiter's Travels, while some of the book's gaps are filled in its follow-up, Riding High.

His books and long distance riding inspired the actors Ewan McGregor and Charley Boorman in their 2004 journey from London to New York on motorcycles (Long Way Round), during which they arranged to meet Simon in Ulan Bator, Mongolia.

== After the first circumnavigation ==
In 1980, married with one son, he moved to Northern California, became active in organic farming and consumer supported agriculture, and wrote the book The River Stops Here: Saving Round Valley, A Pivotal Chapter in California's Water Wars. He went on to write The Gypsy in Me, which details his search for his mother's and, particularly, his father's roots in Eastern Europe. This time he mainly walked and caught public transport between Kaliningrad and Romania. This was not long after the Communist regimes in Russia, Poland, Ukraine and Romania had fallen.

== Second circumnavigation ==
In 2001, Simon started a new motorcycle journey, this time on a modified BMW R80GS, that roughly followed the same route as his 1973 trip. He was around 70 years old at that time and completed the journey in three years. His new book, Dreaming of Jupiter, detailing this journey, was released in March 2007.

== Selected works ==
- Jupiter's Travels (1979)
- The Gypsy in Me (1997)
- Riding High (1998)
- Dreaming of Jupiter (2006)
