= Riders Share =

Motorcycle sharing community

Riders Share (RidersShare, Inc.) is a peer-to-peer motorcycle sharing community based in Austin, Texas. The company matches underused motorcycles with vetted riders that want to rent them. Riders Share uses machine learning to screen riders, supplies owners with insurance policies, and offers roadside assistance to their renters. Main competitors are EagleRider and Twisted Road in USA and BikesBooking in Europe.

As of 2021, Riders Share has a community of 80,000 registered users and over 15,000 members have rented their motorcycles on the platform. They carry a large selection of motorcycles including brands like BMW, Ducati, Harley-Davidson, Indian Motorcycle, and Can-Am.

Their mission is to make motorcycles affordable by creating extra income for people who want to rent their bikes and by helping more than 20 million ex-riders in the United States get back on the road.

== History ==
In 2018, Guillermo Cornejo, CEO, launched Riders Share in Los Angeles, California. The peer-to-peer company is similar to online marketplaces like Airbnb and Turo.

In 2020, The company moved its headquarters to Austin, Texas. Riders Share raised 2 million dollars with LiveOak Venture Partners as the lead investor. Previously, the company raised $970,000 from Texas HALO Fund, Edgebrook Partners, Techstars, and private investors.

In 2021, Riders Share launched their membership service Rider Pass. Riders can purchase an annual membership to receive discounts on their rentals.

== Insurance ==
Riders Share runs its own insurance company that uses machine learning to identify the cost of insuring individual rentals. The company partners with insurance company Lloyd's of London to offer liability coverage to riders.
