= Race to Dakar =

Television series

- DVD cover
- Genre: Documentary
- Created by: Charley Boorman; Russ Malkin
- Presented by: Charley Boorman
- Starring: Charley Boorman; Simon Pavey; Matt Hall
- Theme music composer: Jim Penfold and the Hollywood Killers
- Opening theme: Race To Dakar
- Country of origin: United Kingdom
- Original language: English
- No. of episodes: 7

Production
- Executive producers: Russ Malkin; Charley Boorman
- Producer: Russ Malkin
- Production location: 2006 Dakar Rally
- Camera setup: Multi-camera
- Running time: 45 minutes per episode (approx.)

Original release
- Network: Sky Two
- Release: 17 October – 28 November 2006

Related
- Long Way Round; Long Way Down; By Any Means; By Any Means 2 Extreme Frontiers; Long Way Up; Long Way Home

Race to Dakar is a documentary series following actor and keen motorcyclist Charley Boorman's entry into the 2006 Dakar Rally from Lisbon to Dakar. First aired on Sky Two and ABC Television (Australia) during 2006, it was also released as a book.

== Overview ==
One of Boorman's lifelong dreams had been to enter the Dakar Rally, which he had discussed with the publishers of the Long Way Round book. Having publicly committed to it, Boorman felt he had to do the rally and proposed the idea to Russ Malkin, one of the producers of Long Way Round, who liked the idea. Malkin was concerned that Boorman might not finish the rally should he enter alone, so Boorman approached Simon Pavey to see if he was interested in making the documentary and also training him. A third rider, Matt Hall, was chosen to film their participation and, if necessary, allow his bike to be used for parts if anything happened to Boorman's or Pavey's. They entered the rally riding BMW F650RR rally bikes. The team went out to Dubai to train on the dunes so they'd be used to riding on the sand, but Boorman broke his collar bone early on in the trip, and had to return home ahead of schedule.

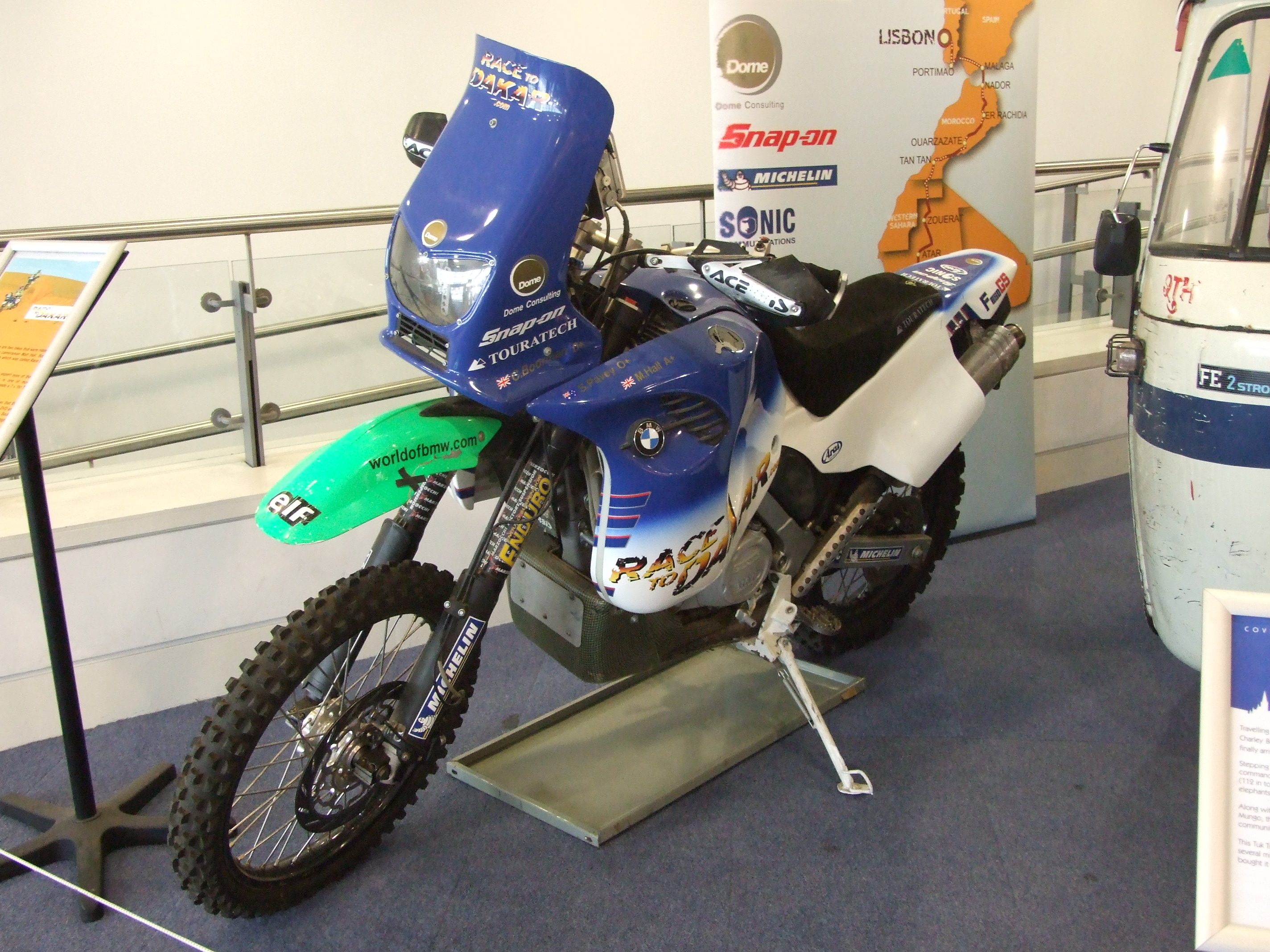
Hall's BMWF650RR pictured at the Coventry Transport Museum

During the rally, Boorman crashed and broke bones in one hand, and dislocated the thumb in the other when he fell and tried to push his bike up and off his body. There is a lot of interesting focus on the mental and emotional battles during which Boorman tries to rationalize his failure. He rode on to the end of the stage and chose to withdraw. Hall and Pavey rode on, but Hall gave up and quit the stage where he spent two days and was eventually picked up by the camion balais sweeper truck. Pavey was able to finish the event. The team were met at Dakar by their spouses and girlfriends, as well as Charley's best friend Ewan McGregor, who flew out to congratulate them.

Fellow British motorcycle riders Nick Plumb and Patsy Quick appear repeatedly during the programme. The accidental death of rider Andy Caldecott is covered briefly.

== Team ==
- Charley Boorman – An actor and keen motorcyclist, Boorman had partnered with Ewan McGregor in Long Way Round in 2004 and later in Long Way Down in 2007. He was forced to retire after five stages when he dislocated his left thumb and broke his right hand.
- Simon Pavey – Pavey manages BMW Motorrad's off-road training facility in South Wales. He has entered the Dakar Rally six times and finished four times. Pavey finished the race.
- Matt Hall – Hall has entered many British enduro races and has produced enduro films. He retired during stage 9 due to exhaustion.
- Russ Malkin – Malkin drove the BMW X5 support vehicle for part of the Rally. He was both producer and director of Long Way Round.
- Claudio von Planta –and Jim Foster, driving the X5 and travelling with the support crew as cameraman and director of photography, he previously served as cameraman for the Long Way Round in 2004, riding the third bike. He reprised this role in 2007 in the Long Way Down series.
