= Right to the Edge: Sydney to Tokyo by Any Means =

2009 British television series

- Created by: Charley Boorman; Russ Malkin
- Starring: Charley Boorman
- Country of origin: United Kingdom
- Original language: English
- No. of series: 1
- No. of episodes: 6

Production
- Producer: Russ Malkin
- Running time: 60 minutes

Original release
- Network: BBC Two
- Release: 27 September 2009

Related
- Long Way Round; Race to Dakar; Long Way Down; By Any Means

Right to the Edge: Sydney to Tokyo By Any Means, also known by the working title By Any Means 2, is a 2009 adventure series by Charley Boorman and is a sequel to the 2008 BBC travel series and book By Any Means in which Boorman travels from one place to another by any mode of transport. By Any Means 2 follows Boorman's journey from Sydney, where the last series finished, to Tokyo.

== Background ==
On 22 March 2009, Charley announced on his Twitter page that a sequel, tentatively named By Any Means 2, was in the works. He originally announced that it would take him and the team from Sydney to far eastern Russia via the Pacific Rim.

Filming for By Any Means 2 commenced on 18 May 2009 leaving from Manly, Sydney with a bike convoy. Boorman traveled across Australia, Papua New Guinea, Indonesia, the Philippines, Taiwan, and completed his journey in Tokyo, Japan.
