= Jupiter's Travels =

Book by Ted Simon

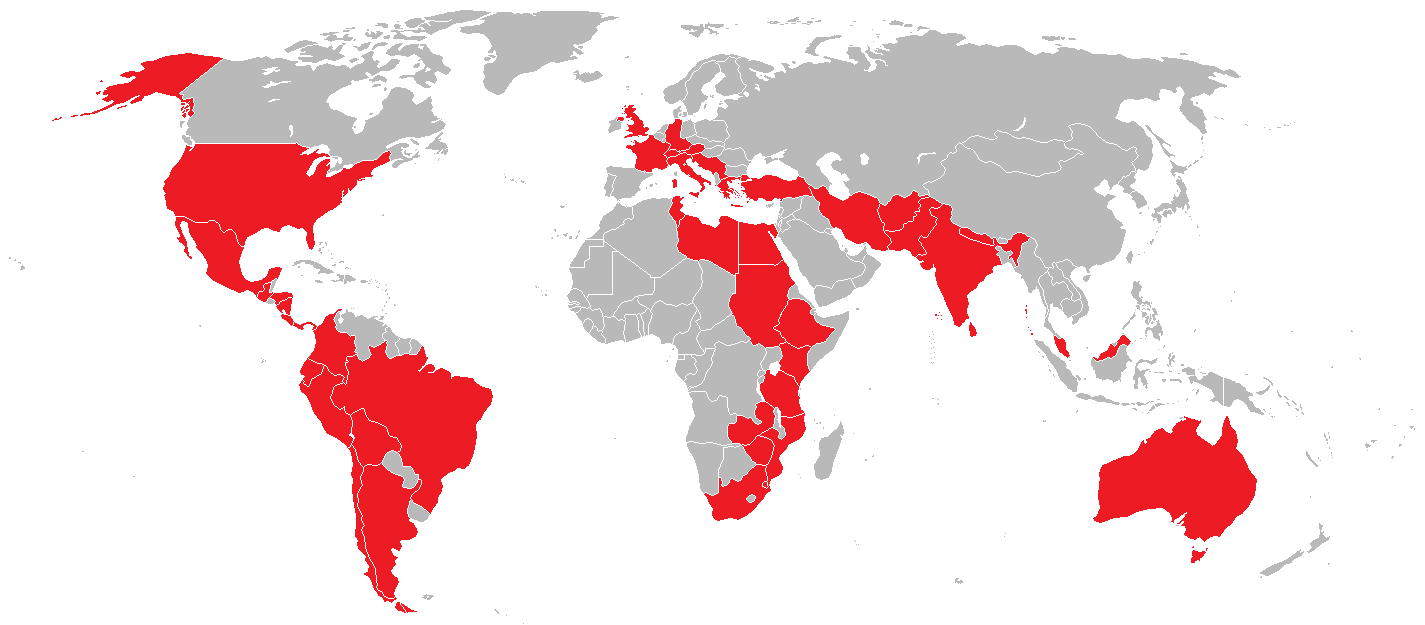
- Map of countries visited by Ted Simon, as described in the book Jupiter's Travels.
- Author: Ted Simon
- Illustrator: Sally Scott (maps)
- Language: English
- Genre: Biography, Adventure
- Publisher: Hamilton
- Publication date: 1979
- Publication place: United Kingdom
- ISBN: 978-0-241-10180-3
- OCLC: 475280967

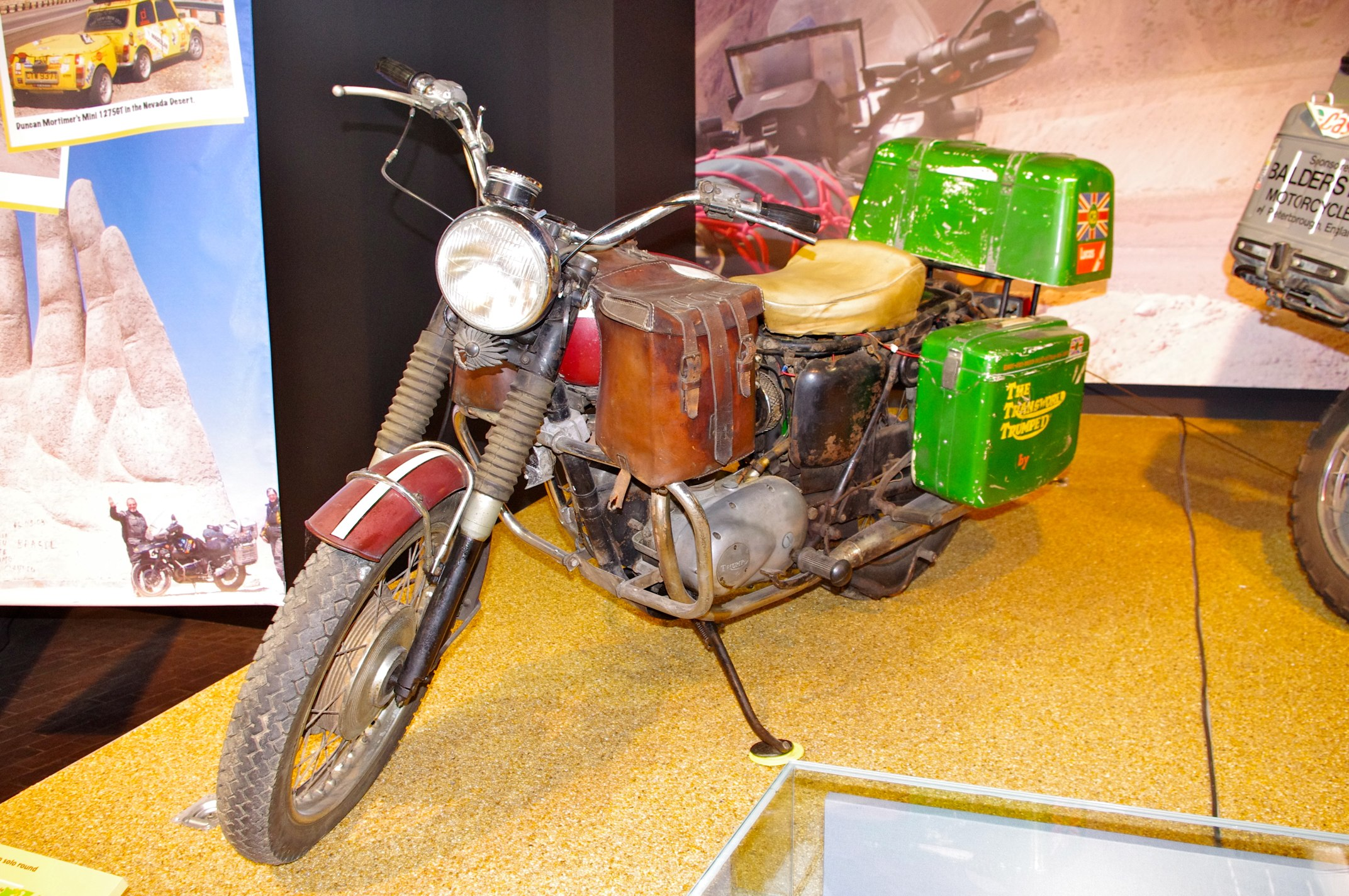

Jupiter's Travels is a book by Ted Simon which narrates his four-year journey through 126,000 km across 45 countries on a Triumph Tiger 100 500 cc motorcycle from 1973 to 1977. His book was first published in English in 1979.

Jupiter's Travels is the first of Ted Simon's books on motorcycle adventure, he is now a widely published and accomplished adventure motorcycle rider and writer, running a writers retreat in France.
