= Long Way Round =

Television series

- DVD cover illustrating Ewan McGregor and Charley Boorman
- Created by: Ewan McGregor; Charley Boorman; David Alexanian; Russ Malkin
- Starring: Ewan McGregor; Charley Boorman
- Country of origin: United Kingdom
- No. of episodes: 7 (10 ep. extended broadcast)

Production
- Cinematography: Claudio von Planta; Jimmy Simak
- Running time: 42 minutes (per episode / approx.)

Original release
- Network: Sky 1
- Release: 18 October 2004 – 1 February 2005

Related
- Race to Dakar; Long Way Down; By Any Means; Long Way Up; Long Way Home

Long Way Round
- Author: Ewan McGregor and Charley Boorman
- Cover artist: Julian Broad (photo) and Duncan Spilling (design)
- Genre: Travelogue
- Publisher: Atria Books
- Publication date: 2 November 2004
- Media type: Hardback
- Pages: 320
- ISBN: 0-7434-9933-6
- Followed by: Long Way Down

Long Way Round (LWR) is a British television series and book documenting the 19,000-mile (31,000 km) journey of Ewan McGregor and Charley Boorman from London to New York City on motorcycles. They travelled eastwards through Europe and Asia, flew to Alaska, and continued by road to New York. The series aired on Sky One from 18 October 2004 – 1 February 2005 and was repeated on BBC Two in 2008. The series was added to Apple TV+ in 2020, along with its sequels, Long Way Down (2007) and Long Way Up (2020), followed by Long Way Home (2025).

== Overview ==
From 14 April to 29 July 2004, Ewan McGregor, Charley Boorman and cinematographer Claudio von Planta travelled eastwards from London to New York City. The journey passed through twelve countries, starting in the UK and riding across France, Belgium, Germany, Czech Republic, Slovakia, Ukraine, Russia, Kazakhstan, Mongolia, Canada, and the US over a cumulative distance of 18,887 miles (30,396 km).

The only sections not undertaken by motorcycle were the 31-mile (50 km) passage through the Channel Tunnel, 580 miles (930 km) by train in Siberia to circumvent the Zilov Gap, several river crossings and a short impassable section in eastern Russia undertaken by truck, and a 2,505-mile (4,031 km) flight from Magadan in eastern Russia to Anchorage, Alaska in the US.

The riders took their BMW motorcycles through deep and swollen rivers, many without functioning bridges, while travelling along the Road of Bones to Magadan. The summer runoff from the icemelt was in full flow, and the bikes eventually had to be loaded onto passing trucks to be ferried across a few of the deepest rivers.

The team stayed mainly in hotels while in Europe, North America, and the more populated parts of Russia, but frequently had to camp out in Kazakhstan and Mongolia. They visited various sights and landmarks en route, including the Church of Bones in the Czech Republic, the Mask of Sorrow monument (described as the "Mask of Grief" in the show) in Magadan, and Mount Rushmore in the U.S. state of South Dakota. They arrived in New York on schedule and rode into the city accompanied by a phalanx of bikers, including McGregor's father Jim and the Orange County Choppers crew.

== Support crew ==
In addition to McGregor, Boorman, and von Planta, the team had a support crew of producers David Alexanian and Russ Malkin, and cinematographer Jimmy Simak. For the journey through Asia, they were also accompanied by security advisor Sergey and doctor Vasily. The crew travelled in two Mitsubishi off-road vehicles – a red L200 Animal LWB 4x4 pick-up (which overturned in Mongolia and was exchanged for a Ford Excursion in Alaska) and a black Shogun Warrior DI-D automatic estate. Additional vehicles such as a Ulyanovsk Automobile Plant 4x4 van were also used by the support crew during the Russian/East Asia segment. The vehicles generally followed about a day behind the bikers, meeting them at border crossings and when circumstances required a greater degree of teamwork.

Before setting off from London, McGregor and Boorman received specialist training to prepare for the expedition. Operating within hostile and dangerous environments (such as unauthorised checkpoints) was covered by ex-SAS major Jamie Lowther-Pinkerton. Training also covered off-road riding, the Russian language, and motorbike maintenance. They took advice from experts and embassy officials about the more remote countries they were to visit. During the first aid training, McGregor decided they would take a doctor with them on the Siberian part of the trip, where they would be far from medical help.

Researchers, dubbed "Ewan and Charley's Angels", helped get the team on the road and acquire all the necessary paperwork and visas.

== Bikes ==
McGregor advocated riding BMW motorcycles, while Boorman preferred KTM (a specialist Austrian motocross and off-road bike manufacturer). They had also considered Honda. After off-road tests on KTM and BMW machines, McGregor agreed to go for KTMs, but KTM ultimately declined to provide them with promotional bikes, out of concern that the team might fail.

BMW then contributed three BMW R1150GS all-terrain motorcycles, which were modified to help the team achieve and document their mission. They were also equipped with cameras, microphones and display/viewfinder screens mounted on the dashboards. A customised GPS with specially mapped waypoints in Mongolia and Siberia was crucial in areas with no roads or signposts.

== Authorities ==
When the team crossed from the Czech Republic into Slovakia, they realised that they hadn't received a stamp on their carnet (a document that ensures expensive items brought into a country are not sold) when entering the Czech Republic. This could have led to the seizure of their cameras, but a bribe was paid and the team allowed to continue. A similar problem occurred when crossing into Ukraine: border officials insisted on seeing original copies of the vehicle registration certificates, while the team only had photocopies. After the team waited around twelve hours, the Ukrainian Ministry of Foreign Affairs contacted the checkpoint and insisted that the team be let through.

The police in Kazakhstan often insisted on escorting the team through the country. The journey became a local news story, and the police would bring them to impromptu welcoming parties, usually featuring a television news crew and offerings of fermented milk. The team grew tired of these unscheduled events and eventually insisted they be allowed to travel alone. After an incident when a passenger in a passing car pointed a handgun at them on a deserted stretch of highway, the team realised the value of police protection and were glad to see the authorities when they reached the next town.

== Filming ==
The on-board cameras used by McGregor and Boorman were designed specifically for the trip by Sonic Communications, in consultation with the team. Each rider controlled two cameras, including one built into his helmet, to provide a panoramic forward view. The second was removable to allow McGregor and Boorman to hold them, and to prevent theft or damage when the bikes were left unattended. They could see what they were filming on a small monitor attached to the handlebars. Von Planta and Jimmy Simak both carried more sophisticated camera equipment to capture story, scenery and action shots of the two principal stars.

== Riding for UNICEF ==
The journey was also used to promote the humanitarian efforts of UNICEF, and the team took time to visit and film some of its work. The projects visited were an orphanage in Ukraine housing children affected by the Chernobyl disaster, a climbing wall at a youth centre in Kazakhstan, and an outreach project working with street children living in the heating systems of apartment blocks in Ulaanbaatar, Mongolia. At the outreach center, McGregor was charmed by a young orphan girl, whom he and his wife adopted after production, named Jamyan McGregor. Details of meeting Jamyan and the adoption, as well as a now-grown Jamyan, were featured in the 2020 series Long Way Up.

== Accidents ==
Ewan McGregor had petrol sprayed into his (recently laser-corrected) eyes at filling stations on two occasions, one of which required a trip to an optometrist in Ukraine. In the first case, Boorman attempted to stop a petrol pump by putting his finger over the nozzle, only to send a jet of fuel directly into McGregor's face; in the second, petrol gushed out of McGregor's own bike's tank while filling.

McGregor's forehead became badly swollen around a mosquito bite in Kazakhstan, which required treatment. McGregor also showed his badly bitten rear in Far East Russia and revealed that his penis had become swollen and painful, again due to mosquito bites.

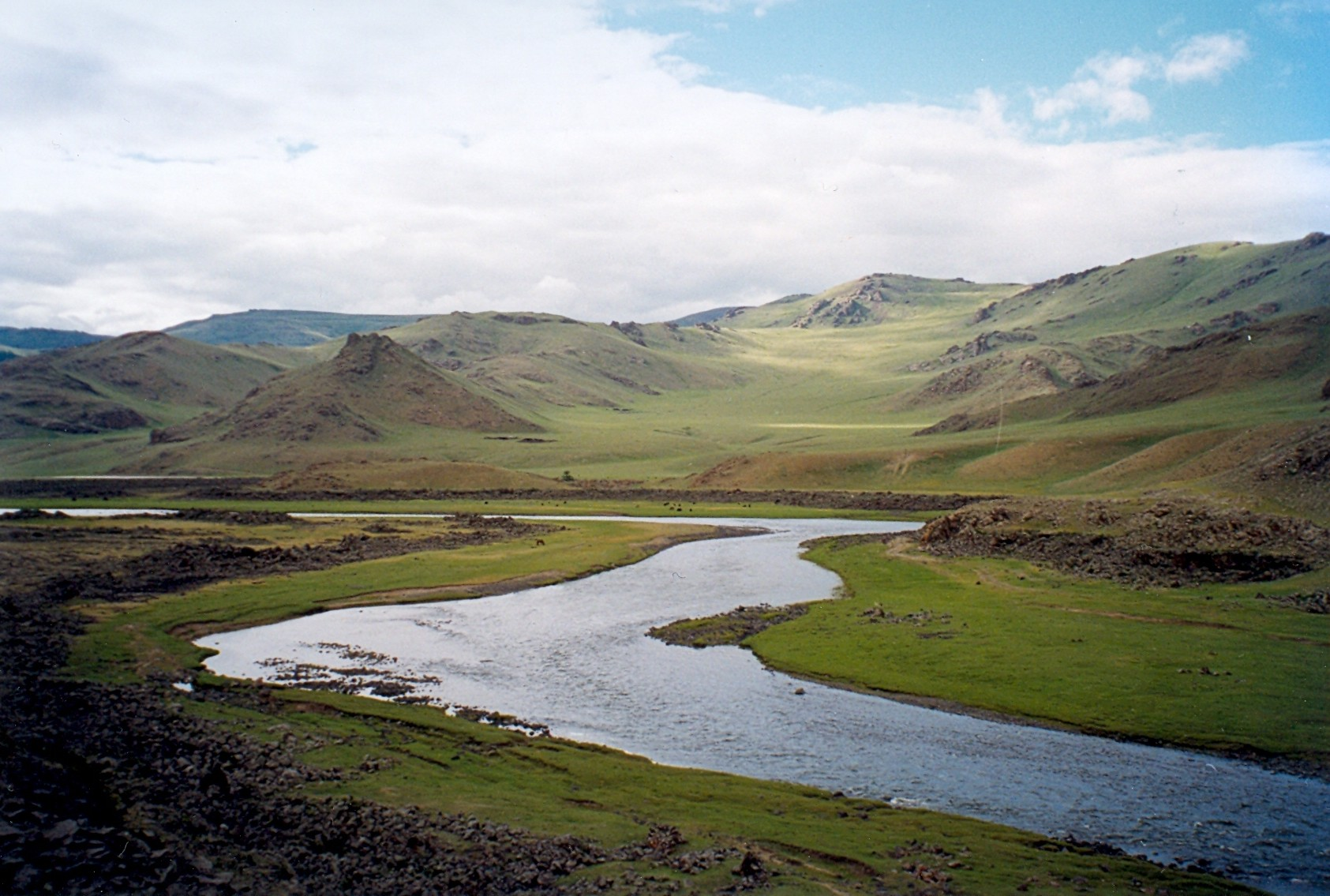
Riding through remote parts of Mongolia and Siberia and crossing swollen rivers was one of the most demanding parts of the journey

Russ Malkin and Vassili the doctor rolled their off-roader in Mongolia, but escaped with minor injuries. Boorman badly strained his left shoulder in Siberia and was unable to ride for several days (mostly while they were riding on local trucks or with their support crew). McGregor was struck by a very young driver outside Calgary and was lucky that his panniers took the brunt of what could have been a very serious incident. The following day, Boorman was bumped while stationary by a driver who reversed into him at slow speed, but without causing injury or major damage. Cameraman Claudio von Planta had an opportunist thief steal his tent and personal effects whilst left unattended in Siberia. Boorman also had his wallet stolen from his jeans at some natural hot springs in Canada, losing $500 and €400 along with his credit cards.

== Motorcycle breakdowns ==
Von Planta's bike suffered a broken frame after a bad fall in Mongolia, and only a bodge-job by Boorman using tire levers and cable-ties enabled them to get to the next town, where it could be welded. Afterward, they realized that the anti-lock braking system no longer worked (due to the battery not being disconnected prior to the electric arc welder being used to repair the frame), and the entire bike had to be shipped to Ulaanbaatar and sent home. A replacement was found locally (nicknamed 'The Red Devil'), a new Russian-made IZh Planeta 5, purchased for about US$1,000. This later developed gearbox problems. Two passing Mongolian sheep herders were able to quickly repair it, laughing that McGregor and Boorman had such high-quality tools but little idea how to fix the bike, with McGregor and Boorman finding the irony as funny as their helpers. The next part of the route was especially wet and muddy, making the heavy BMW bikes undrivable and forcing McGregor and Boorman to man-handle them for long distances, whilst von Planta on the much lighter Planeta had no trouble riding. The frame of McGregor's bike broke in two places just past the small city of Tynda in Siberia, forcing them to flag down a passing truck which took them back to Tynda for more welding.

One of McGregor's greatest fears was drawing water into his engine, which affected his bike twice while crossing Siberian rivers. He pumped out water from the engine and exhaust, and the bike restarted. The bikes also sustained problems after being incorrectly stowed during the flight from Magadan, which required a full service when they arrived in Alaska. Boorman's bike suffered the only serious tire puncture of the trip. Boorman also broke a spoke on his rear wheel, which was replaced by The Motorcycle Shop in Anchorage. All of the motorcycles also suffered bumps, scrapes and cracks, but, except for von Planta's BMW, ultimately survived the journey.

== Music ==
The music in Long Way Round was picked by McGregor and Boorman and includes tracks from Stereophonics, Blur, Coldplay, Orbital, Massive Attack, and Radiohead. The theme song was written and performed by Kelly Jones, the lead singer of Stereophonics. McGregor and Jones had discussed ideas for the song by text message during the trip.

== DVD ==
A two-disc DVD was released as a mini-series late in 2005, consisting of seven episodes of about 45 minutes each, totalling around 400 minutes. The episodes are unnamed, but cover roughly the following:

- Episode 1: Preparation;
- Episode 2: London to Volgograd;
- Episode 3: Kazakhstan;
- Episode 4: Barnaul to Western Mongolia;
- Episode 5: Western Mongolia to Yakutsk;
- Episode 6: Yakutsk to Magadan (the Road of Bones);
- Episode 7: Anchorage to New York

The accompanying bonus disc contains several short features and deleted scenes.

=== Special edition ===
A special edition DVD was released, extending the series to ten episodes of about 45 minutes over three discs (and without the original bonus disc), totalling around 540 minutes. Differences between the two versions are notably at the beginning (the original covers their preparation with one episode rather than two), and at the end (the original shows their trip from Anchorage through Canada to New York in one episode rather than two). The special edition also dedicates an episode to retrospective interviews one year later. The special edition's episodes are unnamed, but cover roughly the following:

- Episode 1: Preparation, part 1;
- Episode 2: Shoving Off;
- Episode 3: London to Volgograd;
- Episode 4: Kazakhstan;
- Episode 5: Barnaul to Western Mongolia;
- Episode 6: Western Mongolia to Yakutsk;
- Episode 7: Yakutsk to Magadan (The Road of Bones);
- Episode 8: Anchorage to Calgary;
- Episode 9: Calgary to New York;
- Episode 10: One Year Later.

The music selection is also slightly different between the two versions.

On September 18, 2020, the 10-episode edition was made available for streaming on Apple TV+.

== Other projects ==
McGregor, Boorman and the LWR team undertook a second journey known as Long Way Down, riding from John o' Groats in northern Scotland to Cape Town, South Africa in 2007. As with Long Way Round, visiting and raising awareness for UNICEF projects was an important part of the journey. Boorman competed in the 2006 Dakar Rally, which was filmed and broadcast in various countries as Race to Dakar. Boorman has also undertaken trips from Ireland to Sydney (By Any Means) and from Sydney to Tokyo (Right to the Edge: Sydney to Tokyo By Any Means).

McGregor, Boorman, and the LWR crew's third journey was titled Long Way Up. They departed from the southern tip of South America and drove 13,000 miles (21,000 kilometres) to Los Angeles, California. McGregor and Boorman rode Harley-Davidson LiveWire electric motorcycles, while the crew vehicles included prototype Rivian electric trucks.

== Inspiration ==
McGregor and Boorman were inspired by motorcyclist Ted Simon's book Jupiter's Travels. They met with Simon in Mongolia.

They also watched Austin Vince's Mondo Enduro and called him for advice before reaching the Zilov Gap.

== See also ==
- List of long-distance motorcycle riders
