= Long Way Down =

Television series and book

- Opening title shot for Long Way Down
- Genre: Documentary
- Created by: Ewan McGregor; Charley Boorman; David Alexanian; Russ Malkin
- Starring: Ewan McGregor; Charley Boorman
- Country of origin: United Kingdom
- Original language: English
- No. of episodes: 6 (10 ep. extended broadcast)

Production
- Producers: David Alexanian; Russ Malkin
- Cinematography: Claudio von Planta; Jimmy Simak
- Running time: 60 minutes

Original release
- Network: BBC Two
- Release: 28 October – 2 December 2007

Related
- Long Way Round; Race to Dakar; By Any Means; Long Way Up; Long Way Home

Long Way Down
- Author: Ewan McGregor and Charley Boorman
- Language: English
- Genre: Travelogue
- Publisher: Sphere Books
- Publication date: 11 October 2007
- Media type: Hardback
- Pages: 352
- Awards: Galaxy British Book Award 2008- Best Popular Non Fiction
- ISBN: 1-847-44053-3
- Preceded by: Long Way Round

Long Way Down is a television series and book documenting a motorcycle journey undertaken in 2007 by Ewan McGregor and Charley Boorman, from John o' Groats in Scotland through eighteen countries in Europe and Africa to Cape Town in South Africa. It is a follow-up to the Long Way Round of 2004, when the pair rode east from London to New York via Eurasia and North America.

The journey started on 12 May and finished on 4 August 2007. They were accompanied by the same key team members from Long Way Round, including cameraman and director of photography Claudio Von Planta and cameraman Jimmy Simak (who also oversaw music supervision and soundtrack production), and producers Russ Malkin and David Alexanian. They also decided to travel with medic Dai Jones, cameraman and security officer Jim Foster, and various "fixers"—local guides and interpreters. They rode the BMW R1200GS Adventure, the successor to the R1150GS Adventure bikes in Long Way Round.

As with their previous trip, and Boorman's Race to Dakar, Russ Malkin's company Big Earth produced the series. The television series began broadcast on BBC Two on 28 October 2007, with clips also shown online. The series was added to Apple TV+ on 18 September 2020 along with the first iteration Long Way Round (2004) and sequel Long Way Up (2020).

== Route ==
The team travelled from their base in Shepherd's Bush, London, to John o' Groats at the northern tip of Scotland to begin their journey. The start was nearly delayed after Boorman, frustrated by an official at Gatwick Airport, made an off-the-cuff comment regarding bombs and was detained for questioning. After being released without charge, he took a later flight to Inverness, and the journey began as scheduled. The team took four days to ride from John o' Groats back to London, via the McGregor family home in Crieff and the Silverstone racetrack, where they camped in the middle of the circuit. They took the Channel Tunnel to France and rode south to Italy. The European leg ended in Sicily, where they caught a ferry to Tunisia.

In Tunisia, McGregor and Boorman visited the set of Star Wars and then rode into Libya. American producer David Alexanian and cameraman Jimmy Simak were unable to obtain the necessary entry visas and were forced to fly from Tunisia to Egypt. After visiting the pyramids, they boarded a ferry to Sudan, continued into Ethiopia and then into Kenya, where they crossed the equator. From Kenya, they rode to Uganda and then Rwanda, where they had an audience with President Paul Kagame. They went from there to Tanzania and then into Malawi, where they were joined by Ewan McGregor's wife Eve. The final leg took them through Zambia, Namibia, Botswana and into South Africa. The journey ended at Cape Agulhas, the southernmost point of the continent, from where they were accompanied to Cape Town by a phalanx of bikers, similar to their arrival in New York on the Long Way Round.

== Border crossings ==
The team anticipated problems at the various borders crossings, particularly in Africa. Given their experiences on the Long Way Round, which included problems with Russian visas, a "fine" for a missing stamp in their carnet exiting the Czech Republic, and delays of up to twelve hours, major preparation and planning went into the transit between countries. Although the American crew members were barred from entering Libya, this was anticipated ahead of their arrival. Upon arrival in Tunisia, the team bribed the local authorities with a few bottles of vodka to aid their passage into the country. It was assumed this would become a regular occurrence while travelling through Africa. Although delays of a few hours were common, there were few significant problems at crossing points as they travelled further south.

== Breakdowns and accidents ==
The quality of road surfaces throughout east Africa were surprisingly smooth, but sections were rough, bumpy or had sandy terrain, with some travel through a small river and mud wallow. The shock absorbers bore the brunt, with both McGregor's and von Planta's bikes suffering broken springs. As the only spare had been fitted to McGregor's bike, von Planta rode in a support vehicle while his bike was sent ahead for repair. McGregor and von Planta also came off and damaged their bikes' bodywork, with von Planta involved in the more serious incident on a motorway in South Africa. Boorman admitted he had been "putting on a show" for a roadside garage and braked sharply as part of a maneuver. Von Planta says he was riding too closely and fell while avoiding a collision; he was shaken but uninjured. His motorcycle was substantially damaged, and the footage of the rest of the journey to Cape Agulhas appears only to include support vehicle and helmet cam footage, suggesting that Von Planta's motorcycle was no longer used. McGregor's wife, Eve, who learned to ride only for the journey, joined them partway and took several falls on sandy terrain in Malawi and Zambia, apparently without injury.

== UNICEF ==
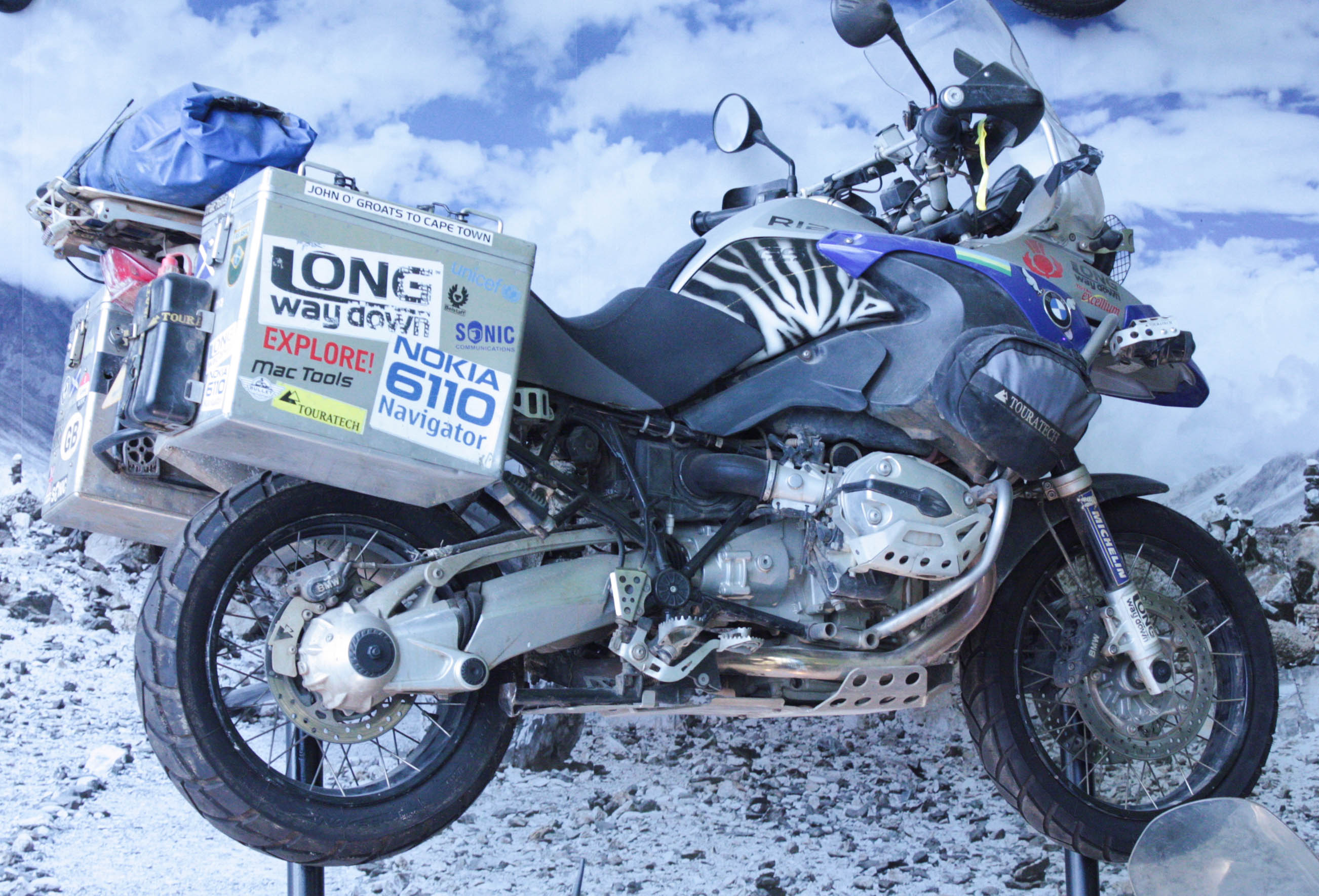
Ewan McGregor's motorbike from "Long Way Down", now in the Riverside Museum, Glasgow

During the trip, the pair visited three UNICEF facilities to promote the work done by the organisation. In Ethiopia, they visited a land mine awareness project and met children injured by mines. In Uganda, they met former child soldiers of the Lord's Resistance Army and saw the work being done to rehabilitate them. In Malawi, they visited care centres for children orphaned by AIDS. Both McGregor and Boorman had visited such centres in Africa previously.

== Music ==
The title song was performed by Welsh group Stereophonics and is identical to the Long Way Round theme, with the lyric "round" replaced with "down".

The soundtrack features music drawn substantially from the catalogue of Real World Records, which produced the accompanying album. Co-director of photography Jimmy Simak also acted as music supervisor and soundtrack producer for the series.

== Broadcast schedule ==
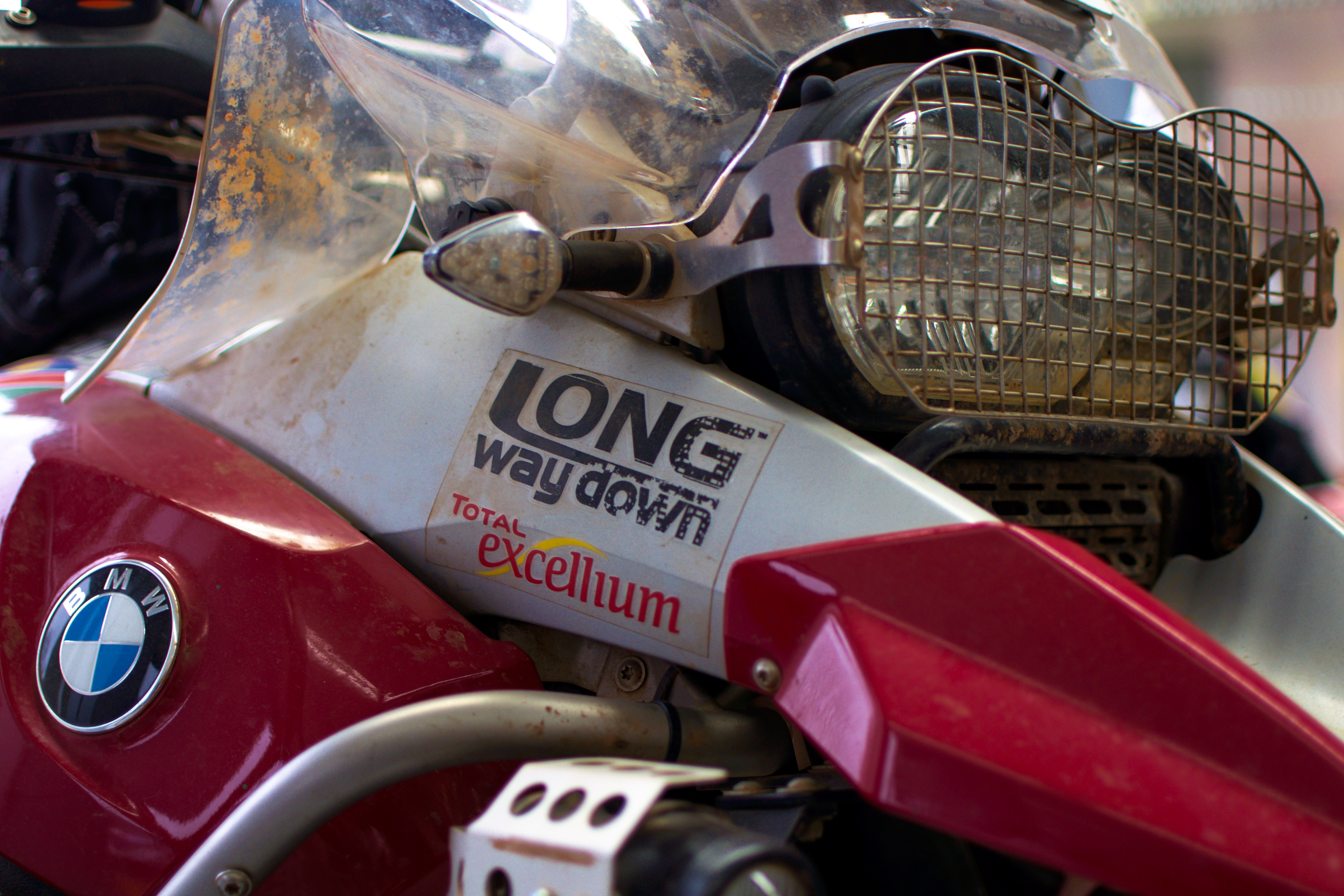
Boorman's BMW R1200GS motorcycle

The original broadcast dates and the Weekly ratings for each show on BBC Two in the United Kingdom were: (all ratings are provided by BARB)

Episode	Date	Official rating (millions)	Weekly rank for BBC Two
Gentlemen, Start Your Engines	28 October	3.82	2
Scotland to Tobruk	4 November	4.33	2
Tobruk to Ethiopia	11 November	3.83	3
Kenya	18 November	3.74	3
Kenya to Tanzania	25 November	3.57	2
Tanzania to Cape Town	2 December	4.14	2

== Future trips ==
The final pages of the Long Way Down mention a "Long Way To Go"; this is not the intended title for a third series but a reference to the continual support that UNICEF needs for its work. In the DVD extras, while preparing the bikes for cargo, Ewan McGregor refers to a possible future trip in South America, perhaps called Long Way Up.

On the Late Show with David Letterman (17 February 2010), McGregor said he was not planning another trip, because he found it difficult to be away from his family for such a long time, but he also mentioned wanting to do a trip from South to North America. In June 2015, McGregor indicated that the long-discussed South American trip was still at the planning stage, but he expected that an excursion through Baja California Peninsula would take place first. In March 2017, during a Reddit AMA, Ewan said there were "no plans at the moment" to do a third installment of the series. On 6 August 2018, Boorman tweeted a tease that the Long Way Up, a trip from Tierra del Fuego to Alaska, would happen "if all goes well". In June 2019, it was reported that Boorman confirmed that the filming of a third installment would begin "in a few months".

On 27 May 2020, it was announced that the series Long Way Up would premiere on Apple TV+.

== See also ==
- List of long-distance motorcycle riders
