= By Any Means (2008 TV series) =

British television series

- Opening title
- Created by: Charley Boorman; Russ Malkin
- Starring: Charley Boorman
- Country of origin: United Kingdom
- Original language: English
- No. of episodes: 6

Production
- Running time: 60 minutes

Original release
- Network: BBC Two
- Release: 4 June 2008 – 23 December 2011

Related
- Long Way Round; Race to Dakar; Long Way Down

By Any Means, also known as Ireland to Sydney by Any Means, is a television series following Long Way Round and Long Way Down TV presenter Charley Boorman. Travelling from Wicklow, Ireland, to Sydney, New South Wales, Australia, it features him completing the journey using 112 modes of transport and only travelling by plane when absolutely necessary.

== Background ==
After Long Way Round and Long Way Down, Boorman and producer Russ Malkin conceived By Any Means in late 2007. Travelling across 24 countries, the crew comprised only Boorman, Malkin and a cameraman, Paul "Mungo" Mungeam.

== Journey ==
=== Episode 1 ===
(7 September 2008) The expedition got under way on 12 April 2008 from Boorman's father John Boorman's house in Wicklow. They rode their motorbikes up to Kilkeel before crossing the Irish Sea by fishing boat to the Isle of Man, and then by ferry to Liverpool. There they took a combination of taxis and a train down to the Coventry Transport Museum to spend the night, where Boorman was reunited with the motorcycle he rode on Long Way Down, before riding again on motorcycle down to The Ace Cafe in London the next day. From there they drove an AEC Routemaster bus down to Dover and boarded a small sailboat across to Calais which they completed in five hours.

=== Episode 2 ===
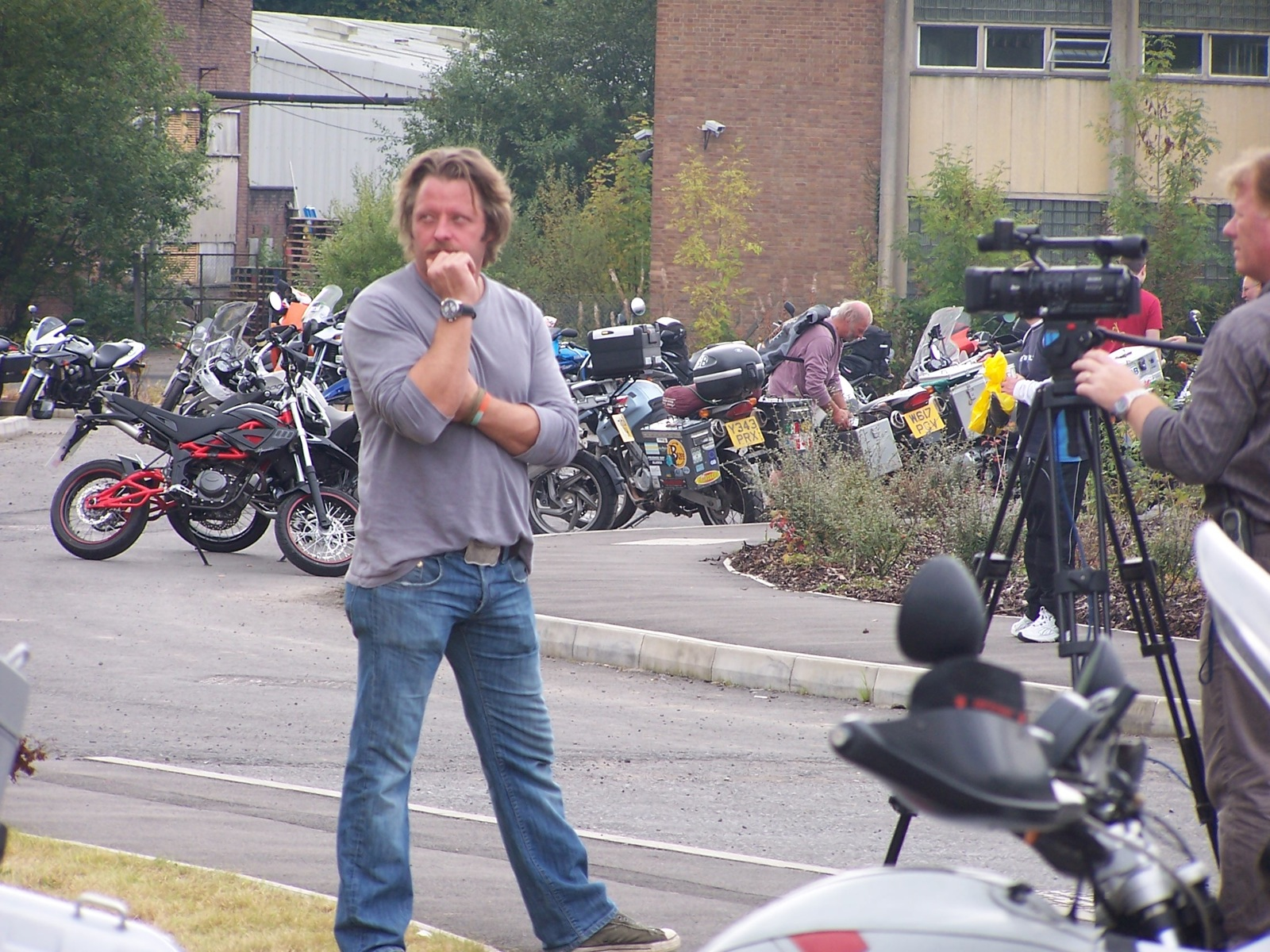
Boorman in 2008

(14 September 2008) From Calais the expedition drove down to Paris in a 1969 Citroën DS and boarded the Venice-Simplon Orient Express which took them across France, Switzerland and Austria to Venice, Italy. They spent some time in Venice, experiencing the daily lives of people on the Venetian canals before boarding a catamaran to Poreč, Croatia. From there they travelled to Zagreb in a Yugo and then to Vukovar where they spoke to locals about the devastating Croatian War of Independence and the city's water tower with over 600 bullet holes in it that still failed to collapse it. They then boarded a train which took them through Serbia and Belgrade and they took a boat down to the Danube. Later they travelled through Bulgaria by train, where they compared the hills and pastures on the landscape to the Lake District in England, through Sofia where they stopped very briefly for refreshments before continuing on to Istanbul.

In Istanbul they experienced Turkish cuisine such as Turkish delight and apple tea which is sold in abundance in the country and they boarded a boat across the Bosphorus and drove across the coast of Northern Turkey in a minibus. It was designed as a public service bus with notices of the towns they would pass on their journey on the windows. They encountered some memorable passengers along the way including one passenger named Fatih (the pronunciation of which is "Farty" – a euphemism for flatulence common in England), this unfortunate conflict of dialect/pronunciation caused some amusement to the team and consequently some upheaval to the point the passenger felt offended and had to depart the bus. They crossed into Georgia to Batumi, where they resumed their journey in an old Russian UAZ and across to the Caspian Sea in Baku, Azerbaijan. They noted how polluted the city was, and the difficulties of the everyday lives of the workers who worked in the multibillion-dollar oil industry despite earning very little. They then travelled down the coast of the Caspian Sea to Astara, Iran but on the way they had to switch transport to an old Russian car (GAZ Volga) which was regarded as a Rolls-Royce of Russian automobiles and quite a privilege.

They reached Iran, where they joined a truck cargo with over one million kilometres to its name and its drivers who took them through to Tehran, on the way noting how the journey seemed split by lush green countryside in which tea was grown, and suddenly juxtaposed against the desert landscape by only a tunnel which they encountered on the second half of the leg. In Tehran they took a taxi through the city, driven by a tough Iranian female driver and boarded the Iranian Express which took them down to Esfahan, Qom and down to Bandar Abbas on the southern coast, travelling with the Bakhtiari along the way.

=== Episode 3 ===
(21 September 2008) From Iran the team took a catamaran across to Dubai which Boorman described as "paradise" before boarding a 270 metre long cargo ship across the pirate waters of the Gulf and the Arabian Sea to Mumbai, India. Boorman found Mumbai extremely crowded and hot, but took the time to visit some pottery makers in the city. He then took a cab to the train station where he boarded a train for the 852 miles journey to Delhi that took 19 hours. In Delhi they took a tuk tuk across the city, where they picked up Royal Enfield Bullet 500cc motorcycles to take them to Agra. During this time the cameraman, Mungo, learned of his grandfather's death and seriously injured his leg meaning he had to return to London to receive treatment whilst the others continued. They took a taxi to Kanpur and then boarded a Tata Truck which Boorman was emphatic about through Allahabad to Mirzapur. There they switched transport to Mahindra Jeeps for some 42 miles to Ramnagar Fort. There they boarded a rowing boat on the Ganges for the five miles journey to Varanasi, one of India's holiest cities for both Hindus and Buddhists. Boorman found the city extremely spiritual and a moving experience, witnessing the Sandhya Aarti and cremations at the river side at night and the cleansing.

=== Episode 4 ===
(28 September 2008) After some time driving a tuk tuk themselves, the team caught the Gorakhpur Express train to Gorakhpur and then an Ambassador 1800 to Sunauli across into Nepal. Due to heavy rainfall the 68 mile trip to Tharu lodge in the Royal Chitwan National Park was a difficult one and they were forced to use 6 different modes of transport in 24 hours including a minibus, Mahindra 275 jeep, a tractor, a Chitwan dugout canoe and even elephants towards Kathmandu in which they eventually caught a taxi. On 28 May it was announced that the old monarchy was coming to an end and a new Republic with a president would be replacing it and they experienced massive crowds in the streets proclaiming the end of the monarchy. After visiting a UNICEF site in the city they took one of the UNICEF minibuses to Kodahi.

Later they took a helicopter trip to Tengboche in the Himalayas which Boorman described as "the most awesome flight he had ever taken in his life" due to the scenery of the green valleys, the looming mountains and Mount Everest. During their time there it coincided with the 55th anniversary of Sir Edmund Hillary's ascent of Everest, and they met his son, Peter Hillary who was visiting with family. They witnessed a marathon being held there, always won by the Sherpas due to them being accustomed to the thin air at that altitude. They were also under scrutiny on the Tibetan border by the Chinese army as their helicopter teetered marginally into Chinese airspace.

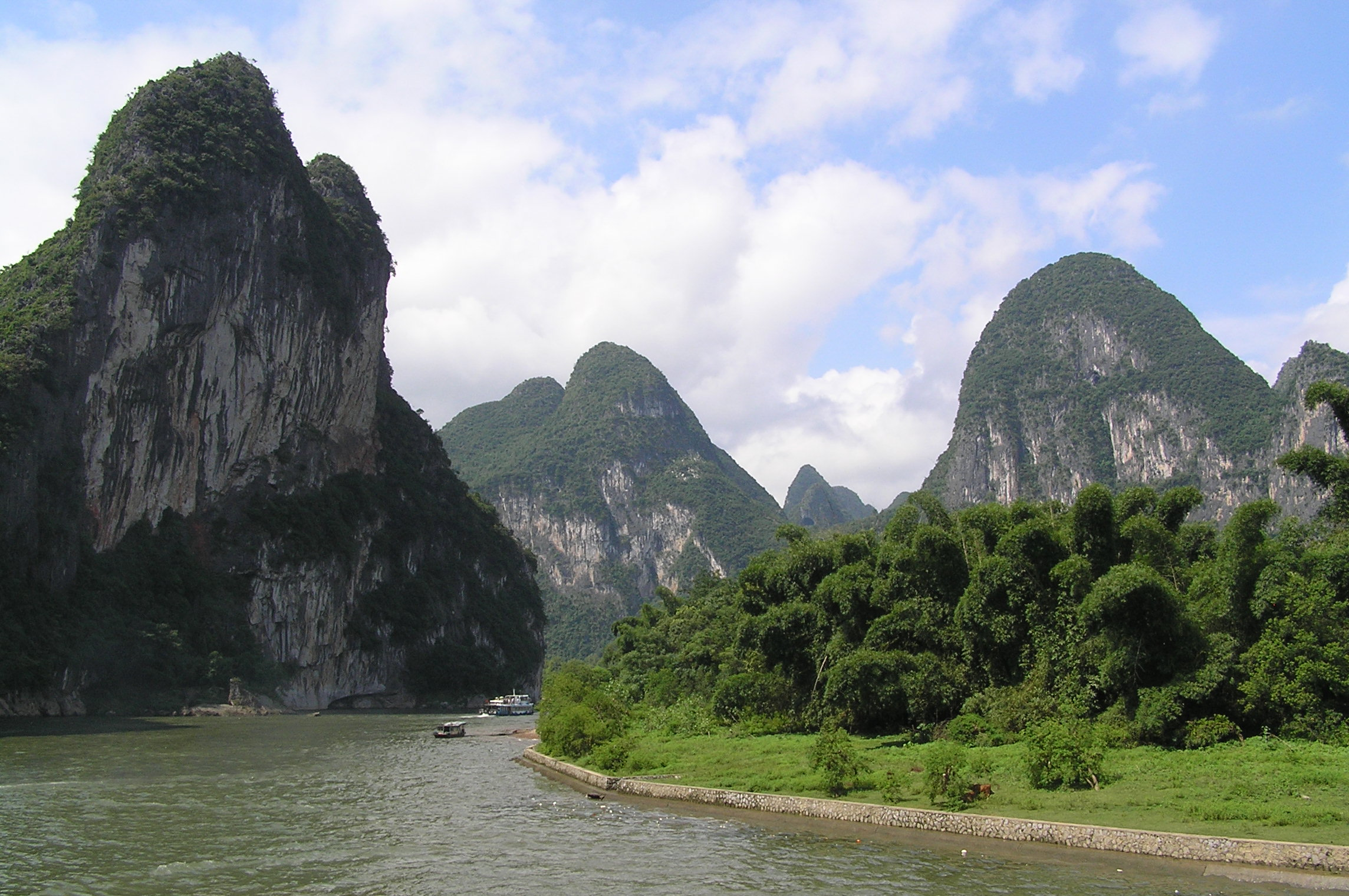
Lijiang River

Back in Kathmandu, due to the natural disasters that have devastated Burma and Sichuan, they caught a plane to Guangzhou in south-east China, where Boorman received treatment for his painful wisdom tooth. They then caught a cement barge along the Lijiang River in a westerly direction through Xijiang to Wuzhou in Guilin province, spending time with a family who live the entirety of their lives going back and forth along the polluted river. In Wuzhou they caught a bus to Yangshuo where they experienced village life in the area and the rice fields, exploring the deep pot hole mud caves, and enjoying a balloon ride. They then took a minibus through Nanning and Guangxi province to Pingxiang on the border with Vietnam.

=== Episode 5 ===
(5 October 2008) From the Chinese border they rode Minsk motorbikes down to Hanoi, where they spent some time learning about the Vietnam War. They then took the 75 miles to Hạ Long by bus and went out onto Hạ Long Bay in a shuttleboat to experience the local pearl trade. The engine of their boat was drenched by a passing wave and they had to be rescued by fishermen, later catching a passenger boat to safety. They then caught a minibus to Nam Định and then the Reunification Express train from Haiphong to Đông Hà, a trip of 289 miles. They then rode 19 miles in an open top U.S. jeep to a village named Vịnh Mốc which had experienced extreme bombing during the Vietnam War as it was a landmark between North Vietnam and South Vietnam. During the war the local villagers built many tunnels to hide, and 17 babies were born beneath the ground between 1966 and 1972. They then visited the Khe Sanh base for further war history. They then reached Dongpanh in Laos and after some part travelled on a Lao Songthaew to Phnom Keng, and they caught a Lod Mei bus through Savannakhet Province. They later travelled down the Mekong past Pakse to Champasak and by minibus to visit the Khon Phapheng Falls in southern Laos near the border with Cambodia, the largest waterfall in southeast Asia. Then via minibus to Veren Kham in Cambodia, they took a rocket boat for two hours which was equipped with a powerful road engine, leaving Boorman confessing it was the greatest mode of transport to date. Past Stung Treng they used dirt bikes to travel across much of Cambodia, including a ferry to transport their bikes across the river, through Kratie and up to Beng Mealea to visit the ruins before continuing on to visit the grand Angkor Wat site, encountering a monsoon along the way.

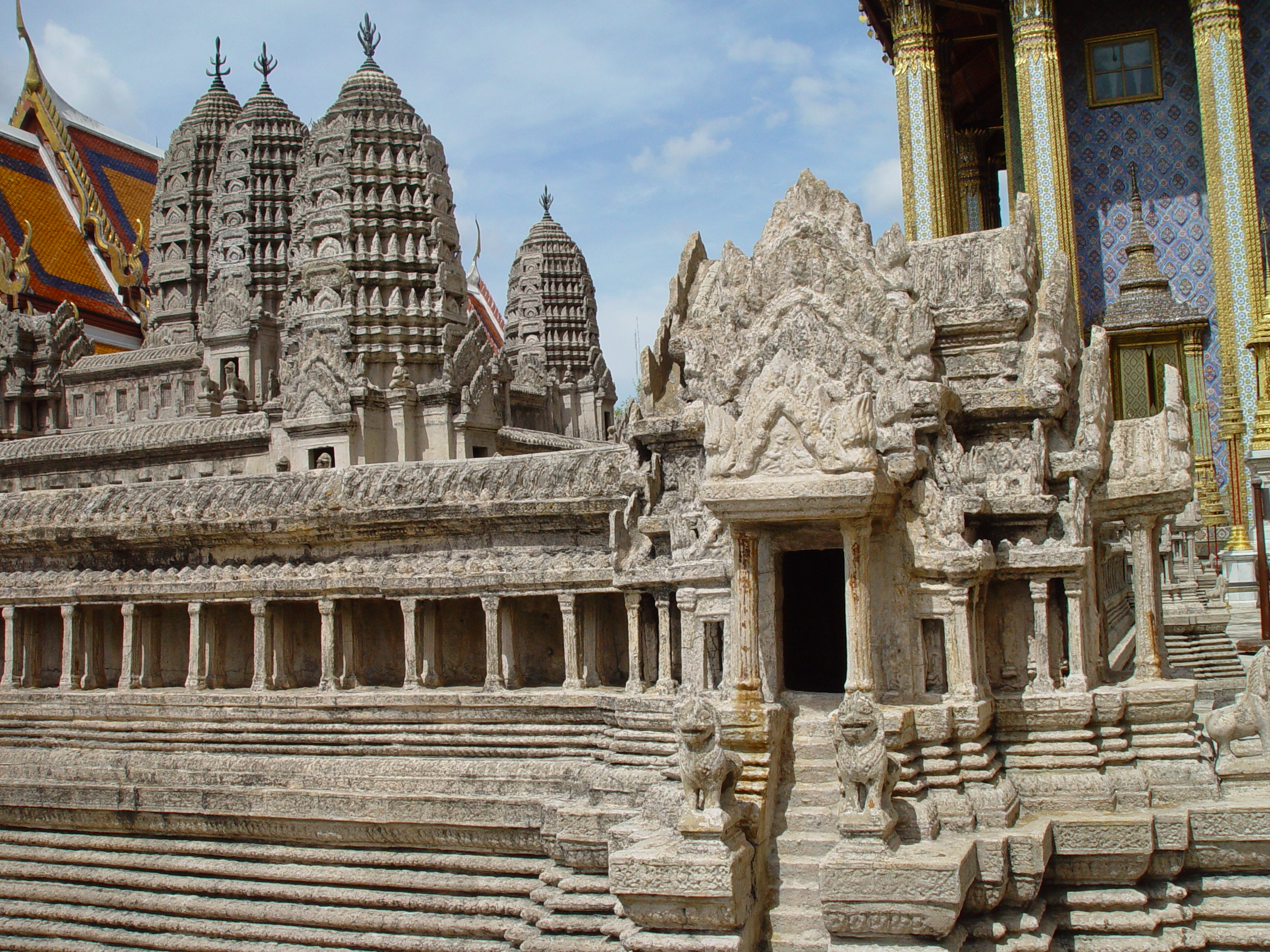
Boorman took the time to ascend the steps of Angkor Wat

After some time visiting the ruins of Angkhor and the surrounding temples, they continued on to Phnom Kulen and rode on an elephant truck to Chang Neas, witnessing the primitive rice farming livelihoods of the Cambodians on their way to Sisophon. In Sisophon they rode about on an old bamboo cart train, and remarked that the town was very dirty and undeveloped. They then reached Aranyaprathet on the border with Thailand by minibus, before boarding a Mercedes Bus to take them four hours west to Bangkok.

In Bangkok, Boorman was surprised by the level of commercialisation of the city, comparing the difference between the vastly undeveloped parts of Cambodia like "chalk and cheese" . He caught the Bangkok Skytrain to beat the heavy traffic congestion and took the time to see Thai boxing. They departed Bangkok on the International Express Train in which due to the tight schedule travelled a 24-hour journey down to Butterworth on the border with Malaysia, from which they caught a coach directly down to Kuala Lumpur, leaving Boorman disappointed that they could not have experienced that leg further. After seeing the Petronas Towers and a mosque they used a hire car down to Danga Bay, and then Boorman became the first man in history to wakeboard (some, but not all) of the way from Malaysia across the bay 12 miles to Singapore. In Singapore he met with old friends and family and their colonial black and white home there, before boarding the Indera Supala ferry to Bintan. They then drove in a 1971 Holden Kingswood, an Australian car across the island, and then caught a water taxi to Nikoi Island before continuing to the mainland on Borneo.

=== Episode 6 ===
(12 October 2008) Boorman went to Pontianak in West Kalimantan, and visited a UNICEF tetanus vaccination facility in the area before catching a flight on a Boeing 737 to Bali where he caught up with Russ. He rode in an X2K speedboat for the 68 miles to the Gili Islands as night was falling. On the Gili Islands he rode in a horse and cart (known to locals as a Cidomo) before resuming a 218-mile journey in the speedboat the following day, arriving 9 hours later in Bima. From Bima he boarded a 222 ft Phinisi wooden sailing ship, crammed with people across the Flores Sea where he stopped off at Komodo Island before returning to Bima to resume the trip to Kupang, in West Timor, East Nusa Tenggara on the Pelni ferry, equally as populated. There Boorman then boarded a small iron wood ship named the Oelin helmed by an experienced Australian and they crossed the 643 miles to Darwin in six days at an average speed of 7 knots. On the way Boorman witnessed dolphins swimming around the ship, remarking it was the closest he had ever been to them.

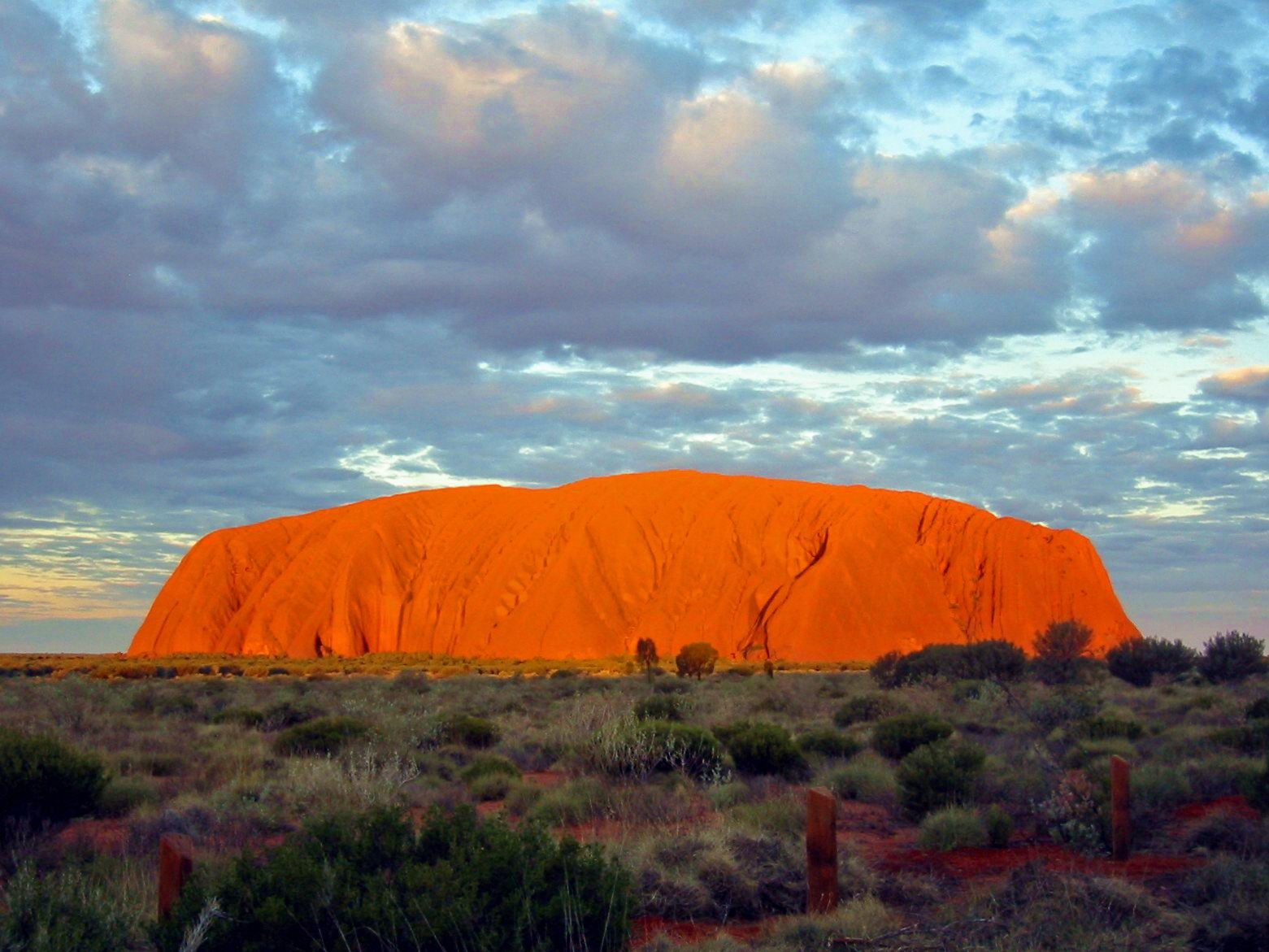
Uluru/Ayers Rock, where Boorman and crew camped out

From Darwin they drove in an old camper van for the 906 miles to Alice Springs, where they took the time for some camel riding and for meeting up with a group of old touring Australian bikers, during which they rode around an old airstrip. They then resumed in a modern pickup can/truck and detoured to visit Uluru/Ayers Rock, camping in the vicinity in the outback, resuming the next day and experiencing some enormous modes of transports such as a road grader and a road train which Boorman compared with his boyhood dream when he would play with Tonka trucks.

They resumed in the pickup van to Coober Pedy and William Creek, reportedly the smallest town in Australia located near the world's biggest cattle run, the size of Belgium but only farmed by three people. Boorman then drove in an old 1953 classic Holden which was a popular family car in Australia in the 1950s to Quorn where he tested out a solar car which had been used in the World Solar Car Challenge. Near Woolshed Flat, he and Russ rode in a steam train, and then resumed in the pick-up van. On the way to the Snowy Mountains, they stopped at a garage where one of the owners was a specialist steel carver who had made many 3D-looking figures out of steel. Russ purchased a large steel carving of a biker who was renowned in Australia in the 1950s and put it on the back of the pick-up van and resumed. In the Snowy Mountains, Boorman went horse riding, before driving up into the peaks via a Ski Tube and then a snowmobile at the top. After descending, they resumed the journey to Wollongong, on the coast where they caught up with their families. They then met up with a rally of bikers in a fashion that emulated Long Way Round, and Boorman on a BMW motorcycle with gang rode the 76 miles north along the coast to Sydney. There, the journey finished in Sydney Harbour opposite the Sydney Opera House. In total they used 112 modes of transport that took them through 24 countries in 102 days.

== Release and tie-ins ==
The show premièred on 7 September 2008 on the BBC and was shown at a later date on the National Geographic Channel. The book By Any Means was published on 23 September and the DVD set was released on 3 November. The show is available to stream in the UK on Amazon Prime Video.

== Music ==
The theme music for By Any Means was performed by Jamiroquai.

== Ratings ==
Weekly ratings for each show on BBC Two. All ratings are provided by BARB.

Episode	Date	Official rating (millions)	Weekly rank for BBC Two
Wicklow to Calais	7 September	2.37	7
Calais to Bandar Abbas	14 September	2.72	5
Bandar Abbas to Varanasi	21 September	2.41	7
Varanasi to Pingxiang	28 September	2.40	5
Pingxiang to Borneo	5 October	2.67	5
Borneo to Sydney	12 October	2.21	13

== Second Series ==
On 22 March 2009, Charley announced on his Twitter page that a sequel was in the works. BAM2 would take Charley and the team from Sydney to Japan via the Pacific Rim. The journey began on 18 May leaving from Manly, Sydney, with a bike convoy and finished in Tokyo on 9 August. The series aired on BBC2 starting on 27 September 2009.
