= Charley Boorman =

English television presenter, writer and actor

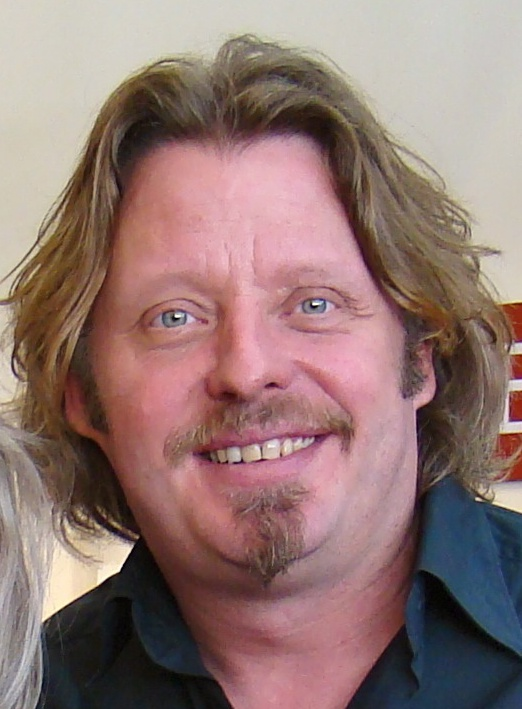
- Charles Boorman in an episode of Long Way Up (2020)
- Born: 23 August 1966 (age 60); Wimbledon, England
- Occupations: Writer, television presenter, traveller, actor
- Years active: 1972–present
- Parent(s): John Boorman; Christel Kruse

Charley Boorman (born 23 August 1966) is an English television presenter, travel writer and actor. A motorbike enthusiast, Boorman has made four long-distance motorcycle rides with his friend Ewan McGregor, documented in Long Way Round (2004), Long Way Down (2007), Long Way Up (2020) and Long Way Home (2025).

== Early life and background ==
Born in Wimbledon, London, Boorman spent much of his formative years in County Wicklow, Ireland. Boorman is the son of German costume designer Christel Kruse and film director Sir John Boorman. Lee Marvin, a lifelong friend of his father, was Charley's godfather.

== Acting career ==
At an early age, Boorman started appearing in films directed by his father. His first role was in Deliverance (1972).

In 1981 Boorman played a young Mordred in Excalibur, and was joined by his older sister Katrine Boorman who played Ygraine, Mordred's grandmother. In 1985 he played a leading role in The Emerald Forest. In 1987 he had a non-speaking role in Hope and Glory as a young German Luftwaffe pilot parachuting into wartime London, having been shot down; his sister Katrine also appeared in the film.

His further acting appearances include The Serpent's Kiss (1997), on which he met Ewan McGregor, and The Bunker (2001).

== Theatre show ==
In 2007, Boorman appeared on stage in Newcastle upon Tyne at the Tyne Theatre. The 'evening with' style show then went on a tour around the UK and Ireland in 2010. Around this time Boorman revealed he had testicular cancer. Caught early, he had a testicle removed and has since been a supporter of Movember. Boorman was given the all-clear, but continued telling audiences across the country about his ordeal, encouraging more men to be aware and get checked out early if there was any concern. In 2011, the Charley Boorman Live show toured the UK and Ireland again, following a similar format to the first tour but without support acts.

Boorman also began promoting African Adventures, which are commercial 17-day BMW motorcycle trips across Africa. Taking 50 riders from Cape Town to Victoria Falls, Boorman used various technologies to help promote the trip, including a GPS satellite tracking device allowing people to follow the trip day by day.

== Charity work ==
Boorman has supported the United Nations Children's Fund (UNICEF) since 2004, carrying out a number of visits to UNICEF projects, which have been noted in his television programmes Long Way Round, Long Way Down and By Any Means. In 2009, Boorman was made president of Dyslexia Action; he is dyslexic. Boorman has been on many visits to Dyslexia Action's regional centres and was involved in the charity's appeal "It's ME!". He also supported its school initiative "P4L" (Partnership for Literacy). Boorman participated in a live web chat for the charity where he answered questions about his dyslexia and his various adventures.

In 2009, Boorman went to Helmand Province, Afghanistan and visited troops. Kandahar and Bastion were the two key camps he visited, just before Christmas.

In February 2014 and November 2016 Boorman presented Gold Duke of Edinburgh's Awards at St James's Palace, on behalf of The Duke of Edinburgh.

== Accident ==
Boorman was involved in a serious accident test riding a motorbike with journalists in Portugal in 2016. He broke both legs after colliding with a wall while avoiding a car that pulled out in front of him. He then broke his hip riding a Vespa while still in recovery. After a period reliant on a wheelchair, Boorman was back riding, but walking with a limp as his left leg was 1 cm shorter than his right after operations to repair the breaks.

== Presenting career ==
In 2004, Ewan McGregor and Boorman undertook an international motorcycle journey from London to New York, riding east across Europe, Asia, and North America. This was recorded for a popular television series and book titled Long Way Round. Critical responses were mixed, with one noting 'Boorman comes across as a copper-bottomed, ocean-going, 24-carat prick.'

Along with producer Russ Malkin (from Long Way Round) and a motorbike team, Boorman competed in the 2006 Dakar Rally in January 2006. The event was filmed and the series Race to Dakar began on Sky2 in the United Kingdom in October 2006. During the rally Boorman was injured and was forced to retire from the race after five days.

In 2007, he took another journey with McGregor: Long Way Down, a trip from John o' Groats in Scotland, to Cape Town, South Africa. This was televised on BBC2 starting in October 2007.

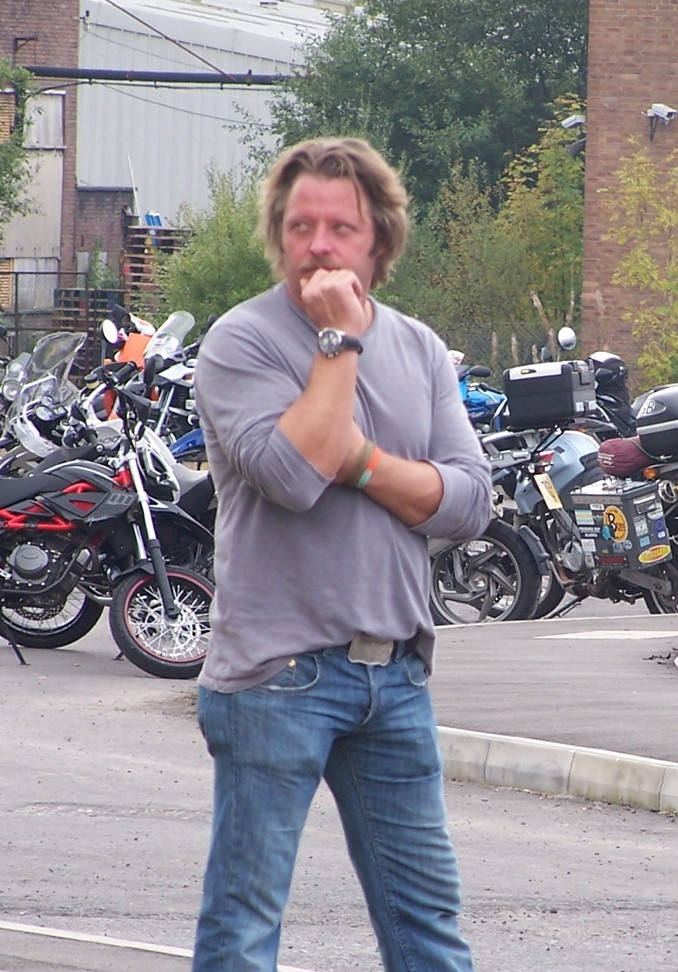
Boorman in 2008

In 2008, Boorman produced By Any Means, which started in his hometown in County Wicklow, ending in Sydney. He set out to complete the journey "by any means", using local transport appropriate to the area being travelled, and using air travel only when necessary.

In 2009, the BCC released Right to the Edge: Sydney to Tokyo By Any Means, featuring Boorman travelling from Sydney to Tokyo via the Pacific Rim.

In 2011, Boorman presented Charley Boorman's Extreme Frontiers, a prime-time adventure series for Channel 5. This show was another collaboration between Boorman and producer-director Russ Malkin, who made frequent on-screen appearances. Extreme Frontiers claimed to 'take in all four extremities of Canada'. Accompanying the show was book and DVD. From 9 June to 22 July 2012, Boorman and his team journeyed around South Africa on two motorbikes and a 4-wheel vehicle.

Boorman and Malkin returned on Channel 5 at the end of 2013 for his next trip, which was in the US. Starting in Hawaii, he moves to Alaska, then to the Eastern seaboard and down to the Southern states, inland to the Gulf of Mexico, up again to the Rockies and finishing on the Pacific Coast at Los Angeles.

For Long Way Up, Boorman and McGregor travelled in 2019 from Ushuaia in Argentina through South and Central America to Los Angeles in the United States on electric Harley-Davidson LiveWire motorbikes.

In 2022 Boorman began presenting Motorbike TV, a motorcycle magazine entertainment show for Motorsport.TV.

== Filmography ==
=== Film ===
- Deliverance (1972) - Ed's Boy
- Excalibur (1981) - Boy Mordred
- Nemo (1984) - Cunegond / lift operator
- The Emerald Forest (1985) - Tomme
- Hope and Glory (1987) - Luftwaffe pilot
- Ada dans la jungle (1988) - Nancy
- Mister Frost (1990) - thief
- Connemara (1990) - Loup
- Massacres (1991) - Ronny
- Beyond Rangoon (1995) - photographer
- Two Nudes Bathing (1995, Short) - The Painter
- The Serpent's Kiss (1997) - secretary
- Cannes Man (1997) - himself
- Cash in Hand (1998) - George Tompkins
- The Bunker (2001) - Pfc. Franke
- I, Cesar (2003) - Charley Fitzpatrick
- In My Country (2004) - Adam Hartley
- Travellers (2011) - Brian Seaborn
- David Knight: Iron Man of Enduro (2004) - himself (narrator)

=== Television ===
Year	Title	Role	Notes
2004	Long Way Round	Himself	With Ewan McGregor, from London to New York City through Eastern Europe, Central Asia, Russia, Alaska, Canada.
2006	Race to Dakar	Himself	
2007	Long Way Down	Himself	With Ewan McGregor, from John o' Groats in Scotland to Cape Town in South Africa
2008	By Any Means	Himself	Ireland to Sydney
2009	Right to the Edge: Sydney to Tokyo By Any Means	Himself	Sydney to Tokyo
2011	Charley Boorman's Extreme Frontiers	Himself	3 Seasons, Canada, South Africa and USA
2011	World's Most Dangerous Roads	Himself	In Episode 1, with Sue Perkins, in Alaska
2011	Famous and Fearless	Himself	Winner. Chosen charity: UNICEF
2013	Freedom Riders Asia	Himself	through six Asian countries: Malaysia, Philippines, Indonesia, India, Vietnam and Thailand
2014	Me and Me Dad: A Portrait of John Boorman	Himself	An intimate portrait about the iconic filmmaker John Boorman directed by his daughter Katrine Boorman.
2014	Celebrity MasterChef	Himself	
2020	Long Way Up	Himself	With Ewan McGregor from Ushuaia in Argentina through South and Central America to Los Angeles
2025	Long Way Home	Himself	With Ewan McGregor from Scotland in a loop through Europe ending in London

== Bibliography ==
- Long Way Round (2004 – With Ewan McGregor)
- Race to Dakar (2006)
- Long Way Down (2007 – With Ewan McGregor)
- By Any Means (2008)
- Right to the Edge: Sydney to Tokyo By Any Means (2009)
- Extreme Frontiers (2011)
- Long Way Back - Autobiography (2017)
- "Long Way Up" (2020- With Ewan McGregor)
- "Long Way Home" (2025- With Ewan McGregor)
