= Long Way Up =

Travelogue Television Series

- Genre: Documentary
- Created by: Ewan McGregor; Charley Boorman; David Alexanian; Russ Malkin
- Starring: Ewan McGregor; Charley Boorman
- Country of origin: United Kingdom
- Original language: English
- No. of seasons: 1
- No. of episodes: 11

Production
- Producers: David Alexanian; Russ Malkin; Lucy Trujillo
- Cinematography: Claudio Von Planta; Jimmy Simak; Anthony Von Seck
- Running time: 45 minutes

Original release
- Network: Apple TV+
- Release: 18 September – 13 November 2020

Related
- Long Way Round; Long Way Down; Race to Dakar; By Any Means Long Way Home

Long Way Up is a British television series which debuted on 18 September 2020, documenting a motorcycle journey undertaken in 2019 by Ewan McGregor and Charley Boorman, from Ushuaia in Argentina through South and Central America to Los Angeles in the United States. It is a follow-up to 2004's Long Way Round where the pair rode from London to New York, and to 2007's Long Way Down, when they rode from John o' Groats in Scotland to Cape Town in South Africa.

The first three episodes of Long Way Up premiered globally on Apple TV+ on Friday, 18 September 2020, and eight further episodes aired weekly through to 13 November 2020.

== Overview ==
The journey covered a 13,000-mile (21,000 km) route, through 13 countries, over 100 days from 5 September 2019 to 14 December 2019, using prototype Harley-Davidson LiveWire electric motorcycles that had been converted into adventure bikes.

Accompanying Ewan and Charley were the key team members from Long Way Round and Long Way Down, including director/producers David Alexanian and Russ Malkin and directors of photography Jimmy Simak and Claudio Von Planta. Joining for the first time were associate producer Taylor Estevez and cinematographer Anthony Von Seck.

The production team followed Ewan and Charley's route in prototype Rivian electric pick-up trucks built especially for the journey. Trucks and motorcycles were sometimes charged at charging points built especially for the journey by Rivian. They were supported by diesel powered vehicles and generators.

== Episodes ==
The series follows Ewan and Charley as they journey up Latin America through Argentina, Chile, Bolivia, Peru, Ecuador, and Colombia, and on into Central America — Panama, Costa Rica, Nicaragua, Honduras, Guatemala — and Mexico, before entering the United States and finishing in California.

=== Episode 1: "Preparation" ===
Release date: 18 September 2020

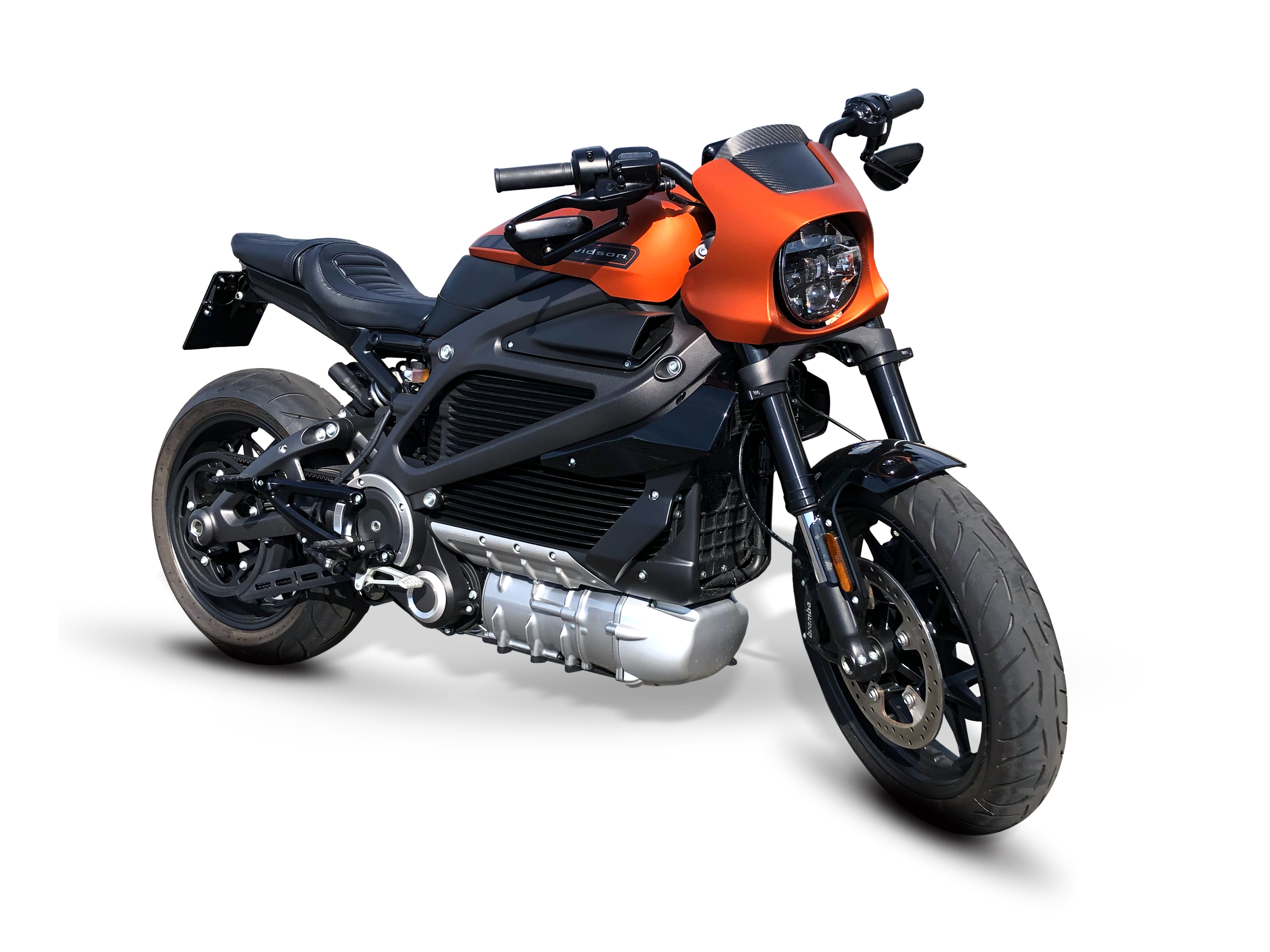
Harley Davidson Livewire motorbike, similar to the ones used

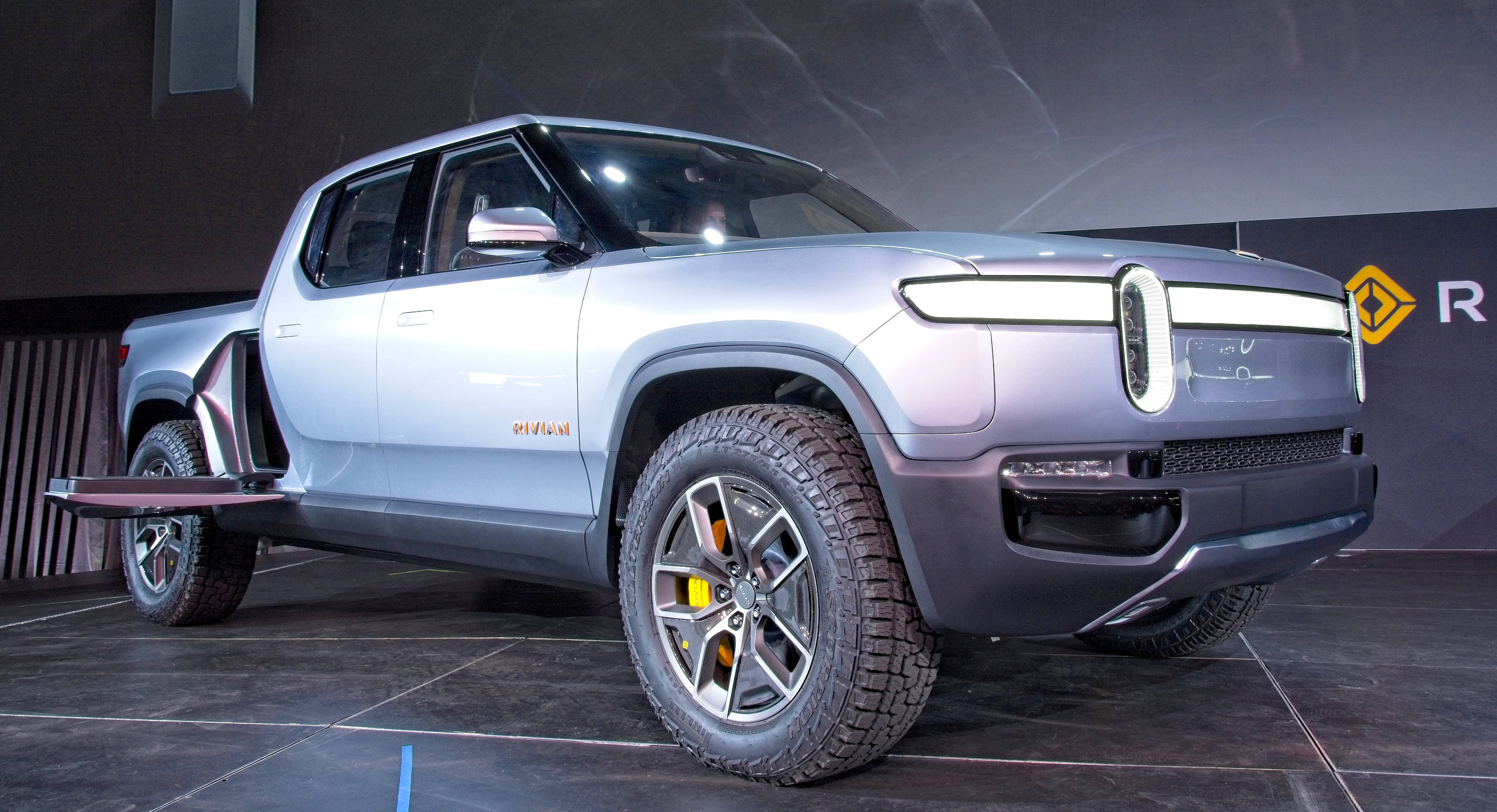
Rivian R1T pick-up truck

Eight months prior to the intended start date of 1 September 2019, the team maps out the route, revealing that they plan to use electric motorbikes. Having tested an electric road bike, Charley and Ewan are satisfied that they have made the correct choice. After discovering that the range of even the best off-road electric motorbike is limited to 72 miles, doubts start to creep in as they intend to travel 150-mile (240 km) per day, which would need a lengthy charging session, placing the entire fourteen-week schedule in jeopardy.

During the planning stage, Charley had a serious motorcycle accident. After recovering, he tests an all-electric Harley-Davidson Livewire. Although designed as a street bike, the team work with the Harley engineers to adapt the design for dual purpose use, receiving the prototypes ten weeks before departure.

Both Charley and Ewan want to offset their carbon footprint for the journey which necessitates using BEVs as support vehicles. Rivian agrees to supply two hand-built pre-production R1T pick-up trucks and install 150 fast chargers along the 13,000-mile (21,000 km) route to keep both them and the electric motorbikes charged.

=== Episode 2: "Ushuaia" ===
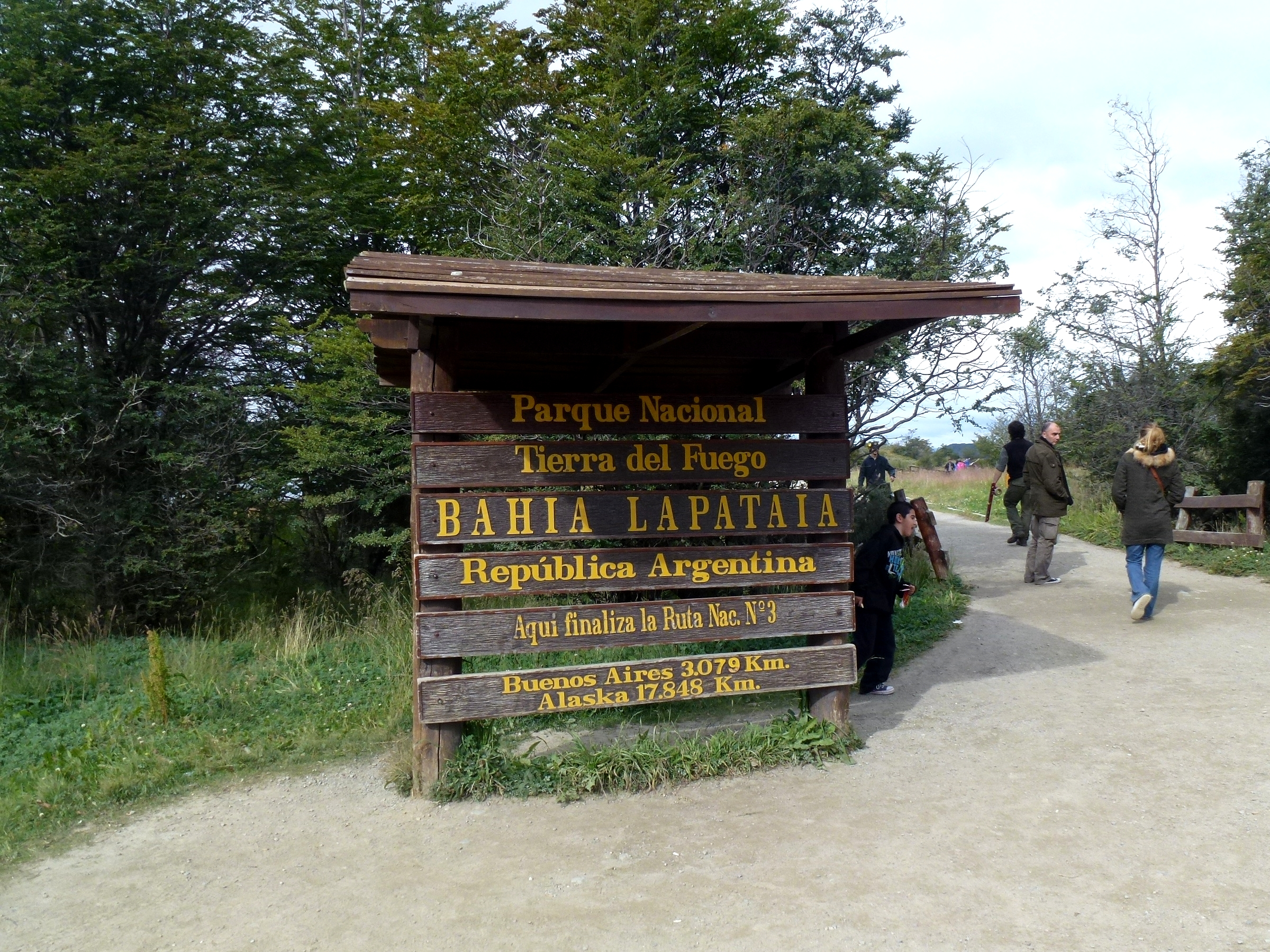
Start point at Bahia Lapataia

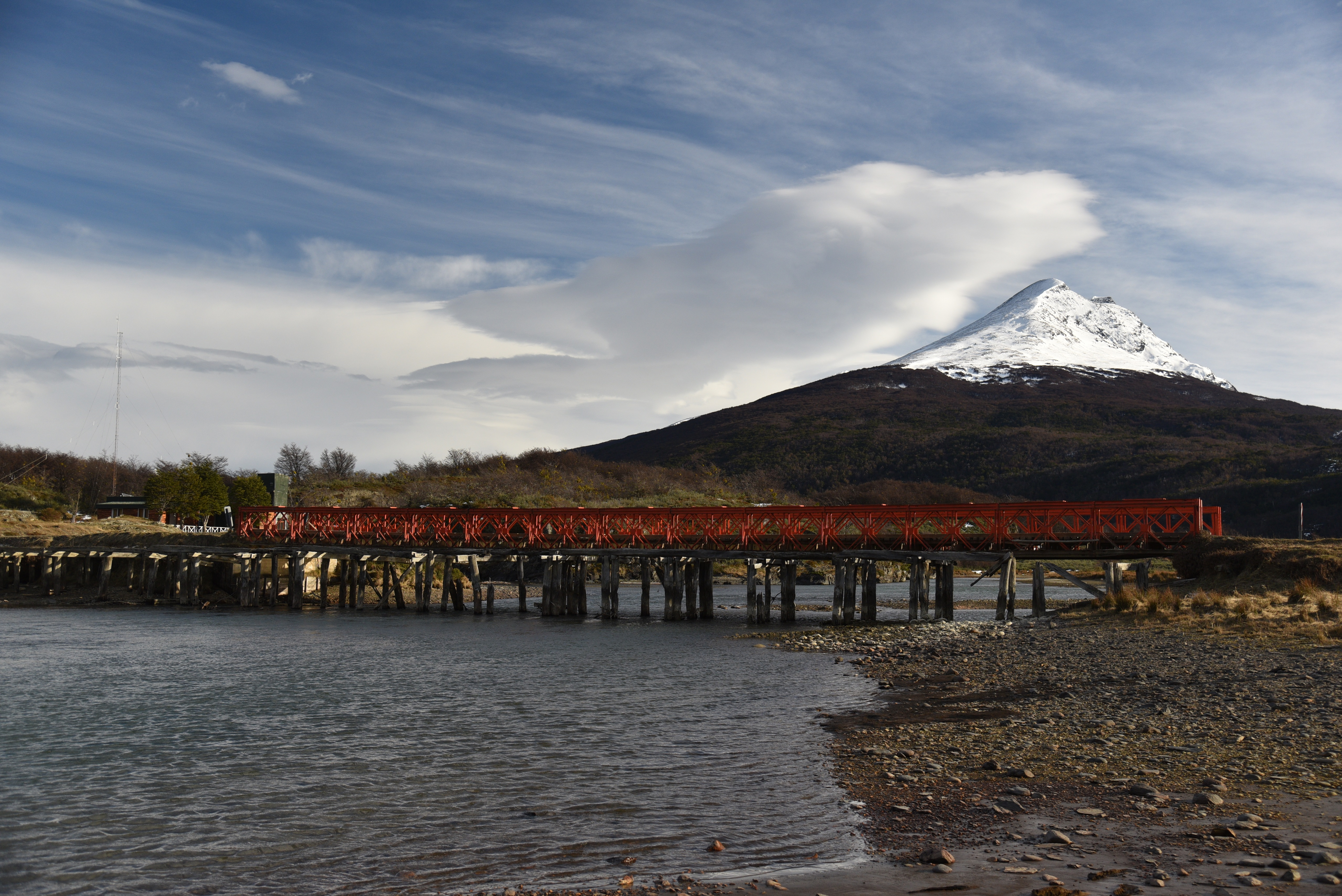
Bridge over the Rio Lapataia

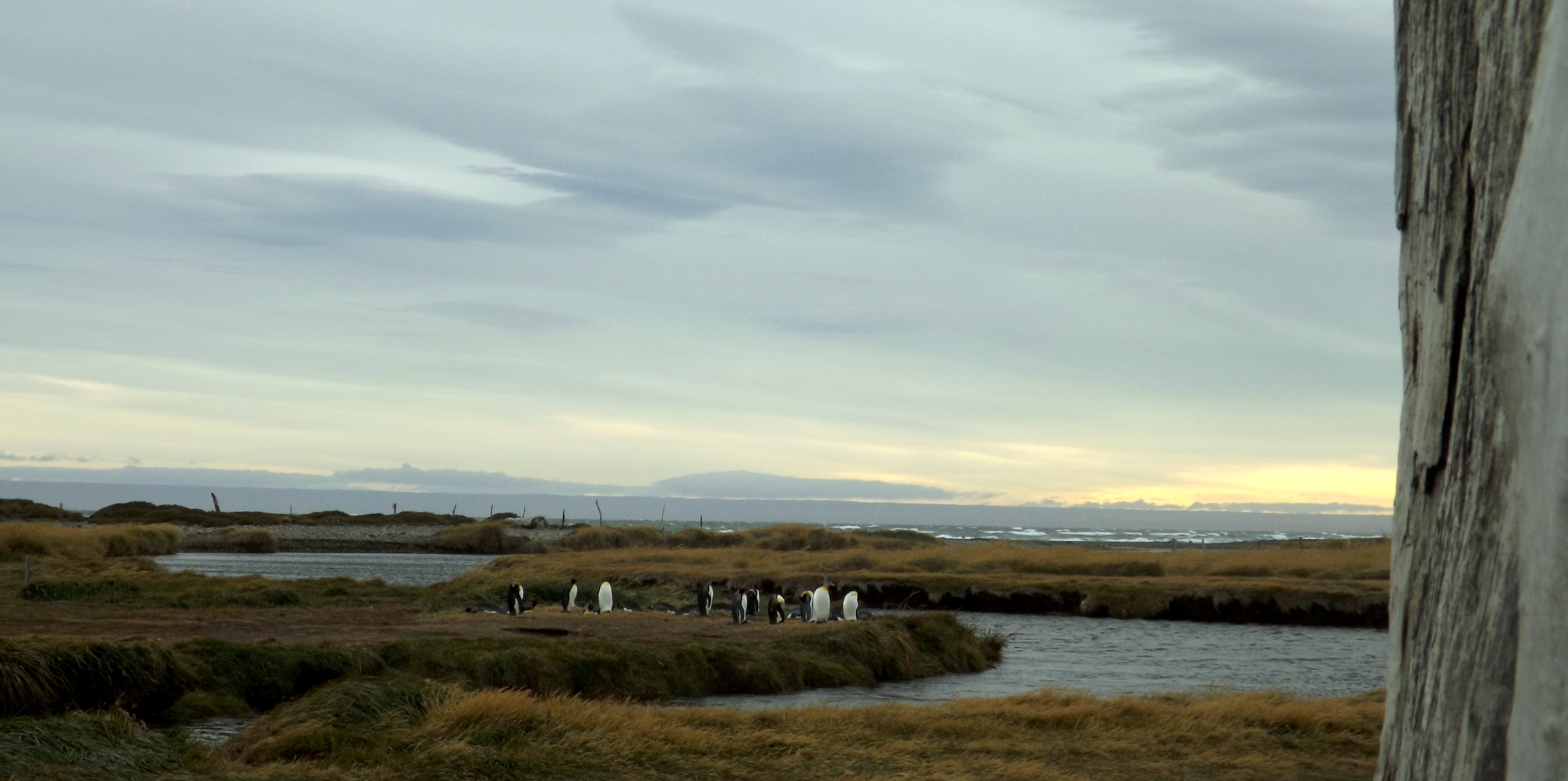
Pinguino Rey Reserve

Release date: 18 September 2020

In Tierra del Fuego the team meets with heavy winter snow. The Harleys’ ability to use level one AC charging is a concern as the level three DC fast-charging equipment is too cumbersome for the duo to carry. The team decides to wait until a new component arrives, delaying their start by three days.

During the initial leg, Charley and Ewan make the first of several border crossings and detour down Ruta Y-85 to Pinguino Rey Natural Reserve on Inútil Bay, to see the only colony of King penguins in South America. Range anxiety resurfaces and they plan to charge from a support vehicle that has solar panels. When this fails, they attempt to charge from sockets at the reserve’s research station, but with a low current, the motorbikes fail to take a charge. The pair take refuge at Estancia Caleta Josefina, which although closed for the winter, opens for them. The production team runs out of charge with ten miles to go, and resorts to tow-charging the R1Ts.

ROUTE: Ushuaia (ARG) → Ruta Nacional 3 → Tolhuin (ARG) → Ruta Nacional 3 → Border crossing (San Sebastián) → Ruta 257-CH → Onaisin (CHL)

=== Episode 3: "Southern Patagonia" ===
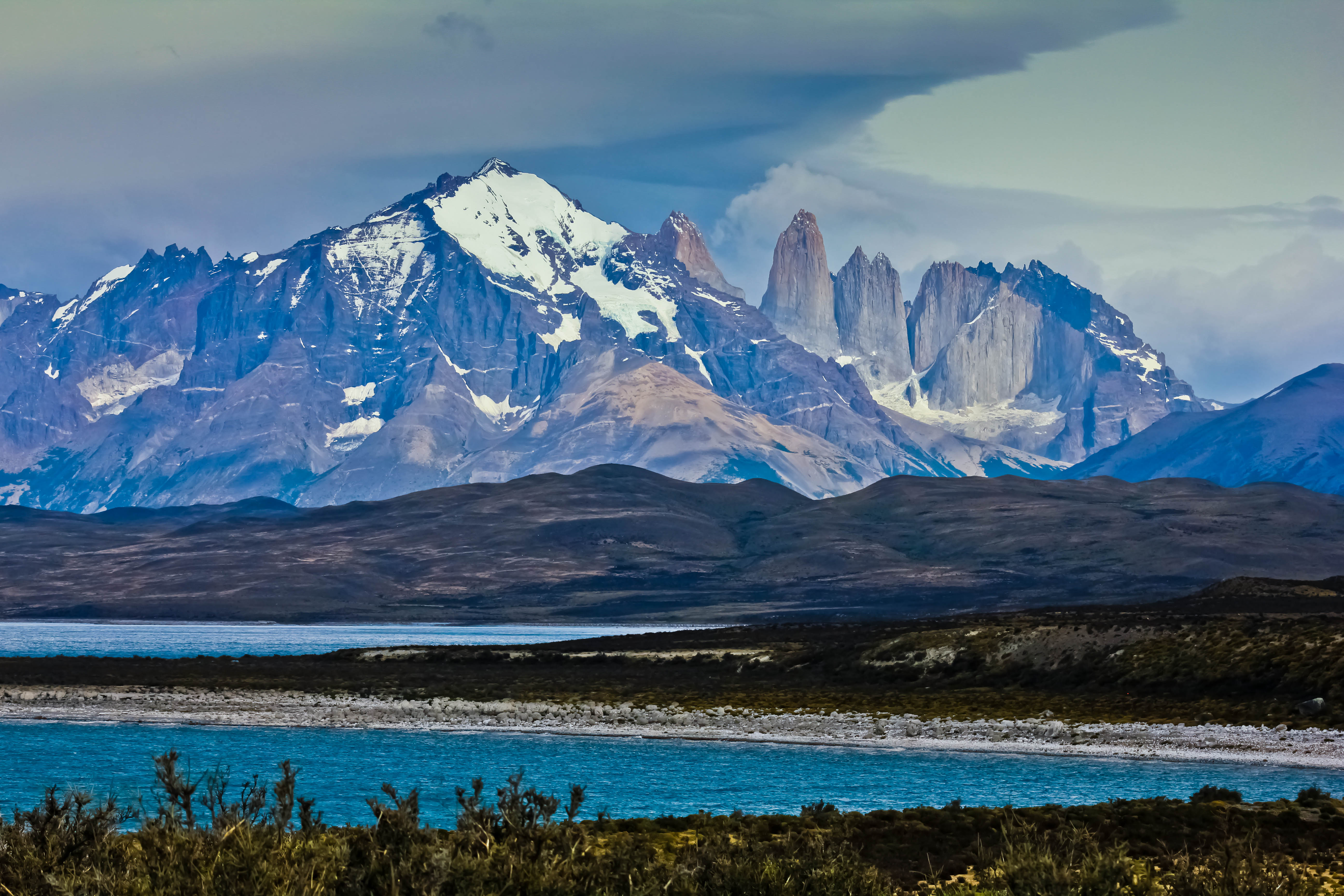
Torres del Paine National Park

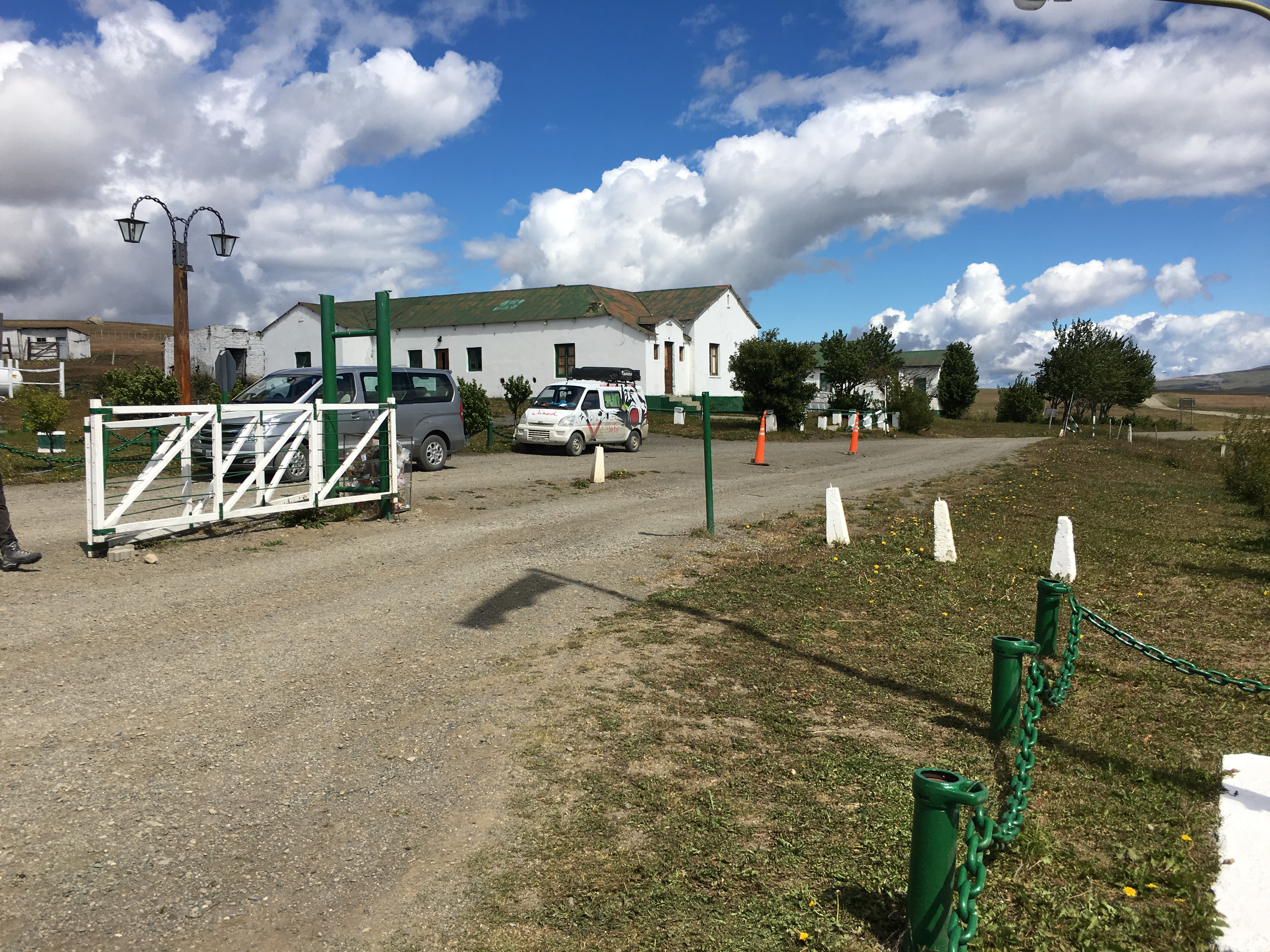
Border crossing at Río Don Guillemo

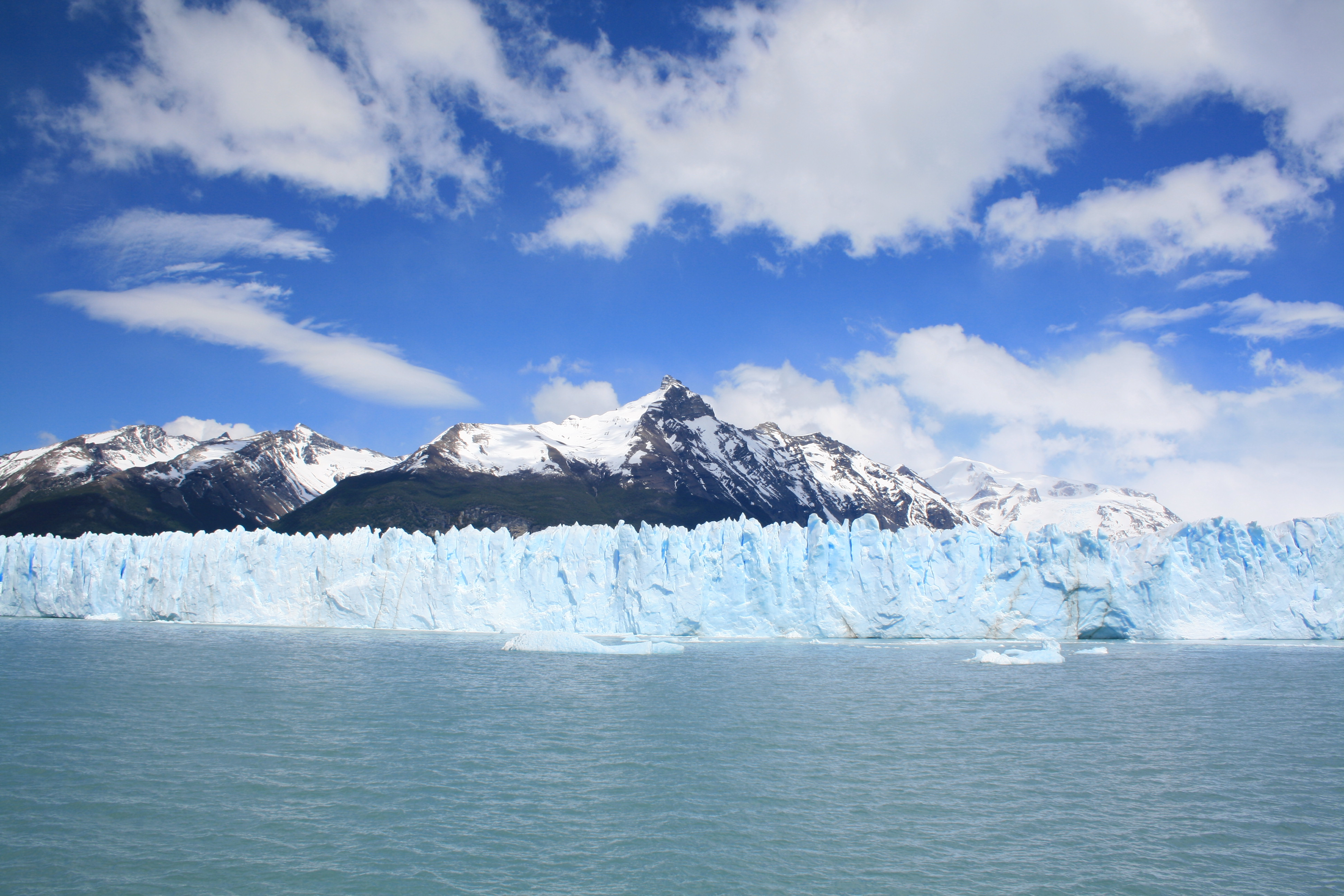
Perito Moreno Glacier

Release date: 18 September 2020

After unsuccessful attempts at charging overnight, Charley and Ewan ask the support team to bring a diesel generator to charge the motorbikes. Nevertheless, Ewan runs out of charge within sight of the ferry and the production team has to assist him.

Two days are spent in the Torres del Paine National Park in Chilean Patagonia. Whilst lodging at EcoCamp Patagonia, charging proves challenging and overnight both the 12-volt batteries that power the motorbikes' electrical systems discharge. After jump starting both motorbikes, it appears they have enough range in the traction batteries to make it to the border with Argentina, but once across, again they have to use a diesel generator for recharging before the 100-mile (160 km) section to El Calafate in Santa Cruz province.

The duo decides to take the next day off to recharge the motorbikes, and to take a boat trip to the Perito Moreno Glacier in Los Glaciares National Park.

ROUTE: Onaisin (CHL) → Ruta Y-71 → Porvenir (CHL) → Ferry (Pathagon) → Punta Arenas (CHL) → Ruta 9-CH → Torres del Paine (CHL) → Ruta Y-150 / Y-156 → Torres del Paine National Park (CHL) → Ruta Y-156 / Y-150 → Torres del Paine (CHL) → Ruta Y-205 → Border crossing (Río Don Guillemo) → Ruta Nacional 40 → El Calafate (ARG) → Ruta Nacional 40 → La Leóna (ARG) → Ruta Nacional 40 → Tres Lagos (ARG) → Ruta Nacional 40 → Las Horquetas (ARG)

=== Episode 4: "The Andes" ===
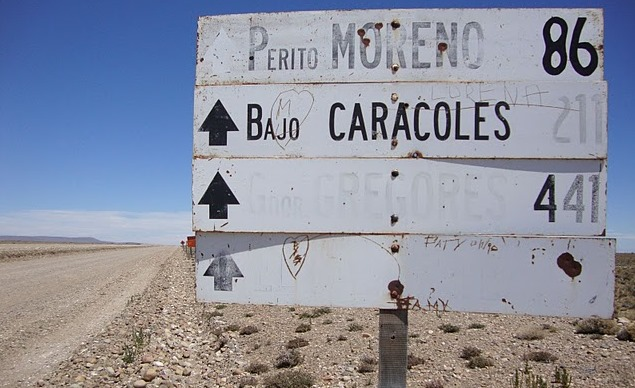
RN40 to Perito Moreno

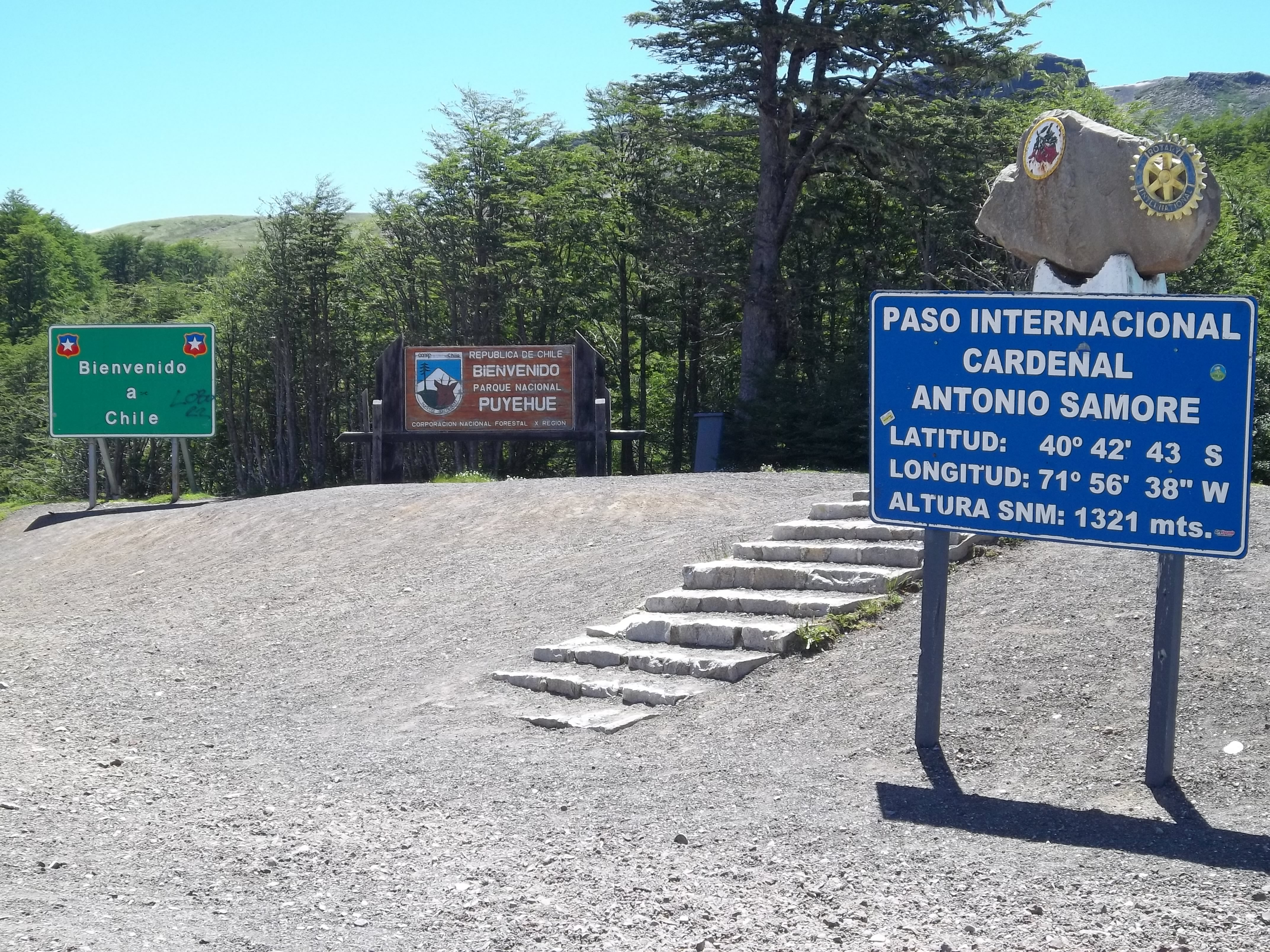
Border crossing (scene of the snowball fight)

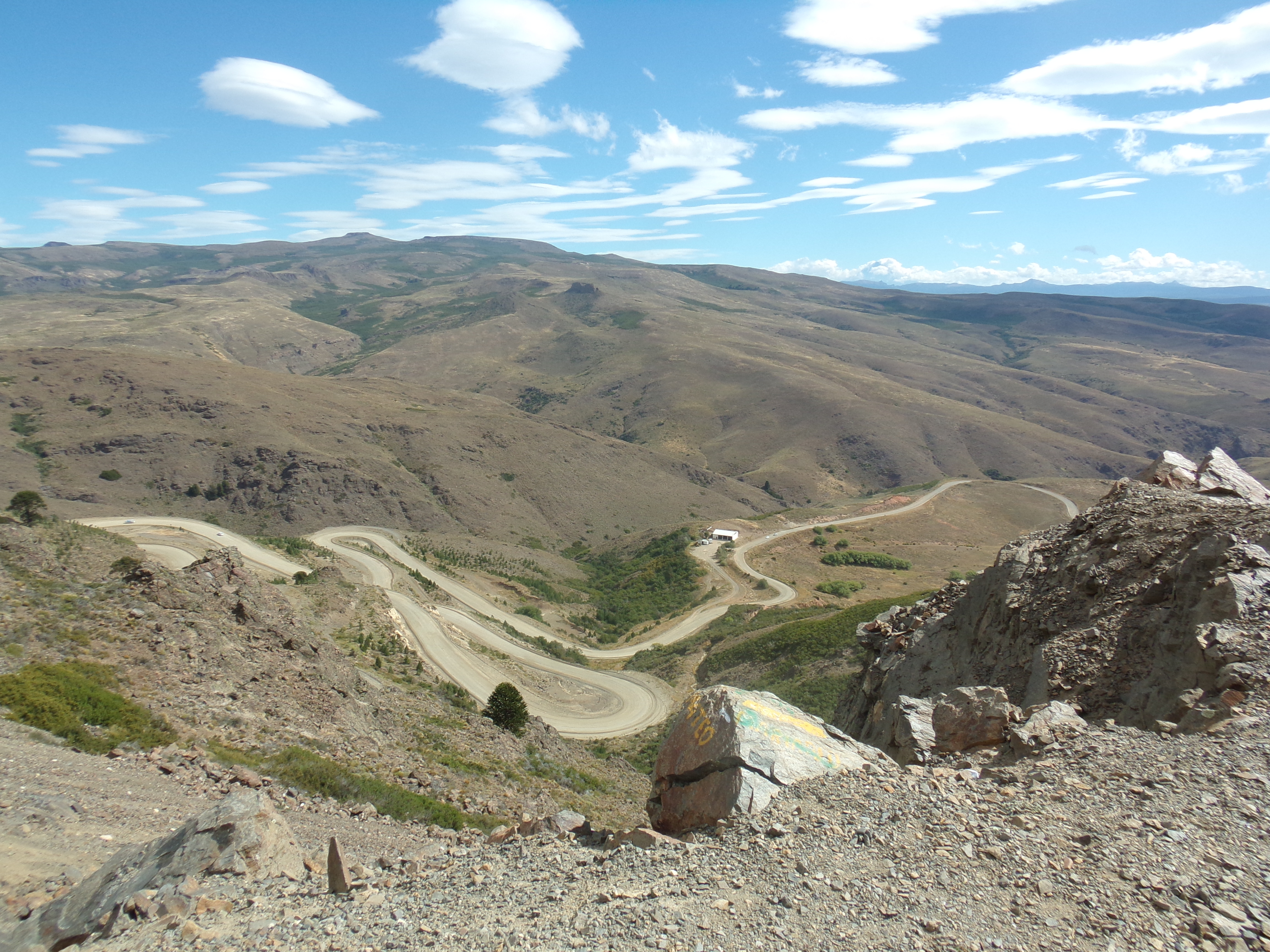
Switchbacks on the RP46

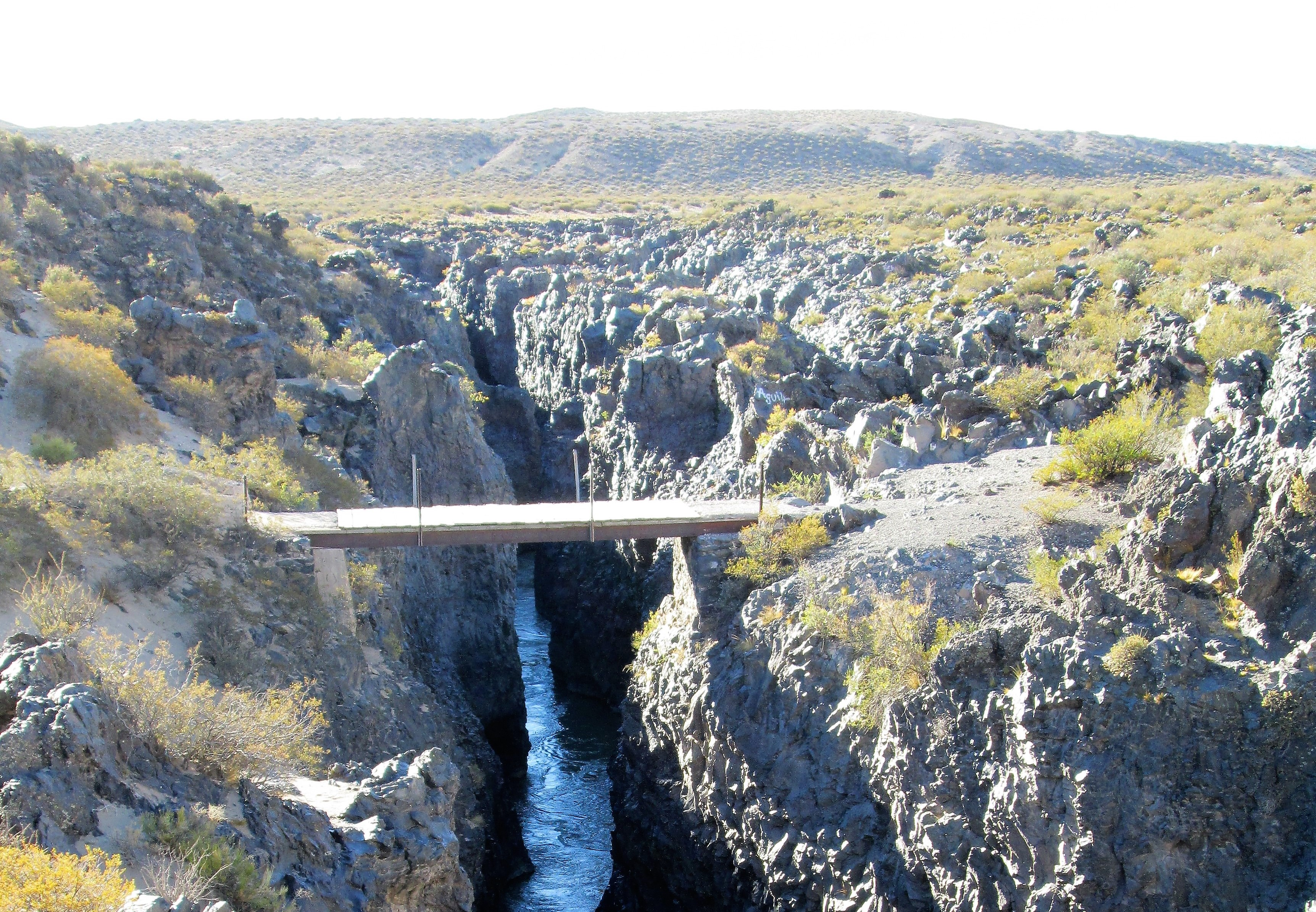
La Pasarela

Release date: 25 September 2020 (despite the name, this episode features very little of the Andes!)

The pair crosses back into Chile, now understanding that the bikes' batteries perform worse in cold temperatures. They adjust their expectations, traversing the Aysén region and the Carretera Austral to the port of Chaitén. Here the team elects to cross both the Gulf of Corcovado and the Gulf of Ancud by ferry to Puerto Montt as there are several gaps in the Carretera Austral further north which need either multiple water crossings or a long detour inland.

Whilst Charley and Ewan head along the Pan-American highway toward another border crossing, and into the Argentinian province of Neuquén, the production team, off-grid and running low on charge, co-opt a semi-truck driver to give them a tow-charge. David’s R1T has its first breakdown on the way to Las Lajas, but a system reboot sees it on its way. After adjusting their route to visit the Bajada del Rahue switchbacks on RP46, Charley and Ewan face another delay in Zapala whilst they wait for cameraman Claudio, who is riding a petrol Harley-Davidson Sportster XL1200, to refuel. Nevertheless, they manage a 137.6-mile (221.4 km) distance on a full charge due to warmer temperatures. They visit the indigenous Mapuche communities in Chorriaca and Chos Malal, and then camp for the first time on the trip near Barrancas. They are awestruck by The Catwalk (La Pasarela), where the RN40 crosses the Rio Grande and the Agua del Toro hydroelectric dam in Mendoza province.

ROUTE: Las Horquetas (ARG) → Ruta Nacional 40 → Perito Moreno (ARG) → Ruta Provincial 45 → Border crossing (Ingeniero Pallavicini) → Ruta X-65 / Ruta 7-CH → Villa Mañihuales (CHL) → Ruta 7-CH → Puyuhuapi (CHL) → Ruta 7-CH → Chaitén (CHL) → Ferry (Agios) → Puerto Montt (CHL) → Ruta 5-CH / Ruta 215-CH → Border crossing (Cardenal Antonio Samoré Pass) → Ruta Nacional 231 / Ruta Nacional 40 → Villa La Angostura (ARG) → Ruta Nacional 40 / Ruta Provincial 23 → Aluminé (ARG) → Ruta Provincial 46 → Zapala (ARG) → Ruta Nacional 40 → Las Lajas (ARG) → Ruta Nacional 40 → Barrancas (ARG) → Ruta Nacional 40 → Bardas Blancas (ARG) → Ruta Nacional 40 → Malargüe (ARG) → Ruta Nacional 40 → San Juan (ARG) → Ruta Nacional 40 → Villa Unión (ARG) → Ruta Nacional 40 → Chilecito (ARG) → Ruta Nacional 40 → Belén (ARG)

=== Episode 5: "Atacama Desert into Bolivia" ===
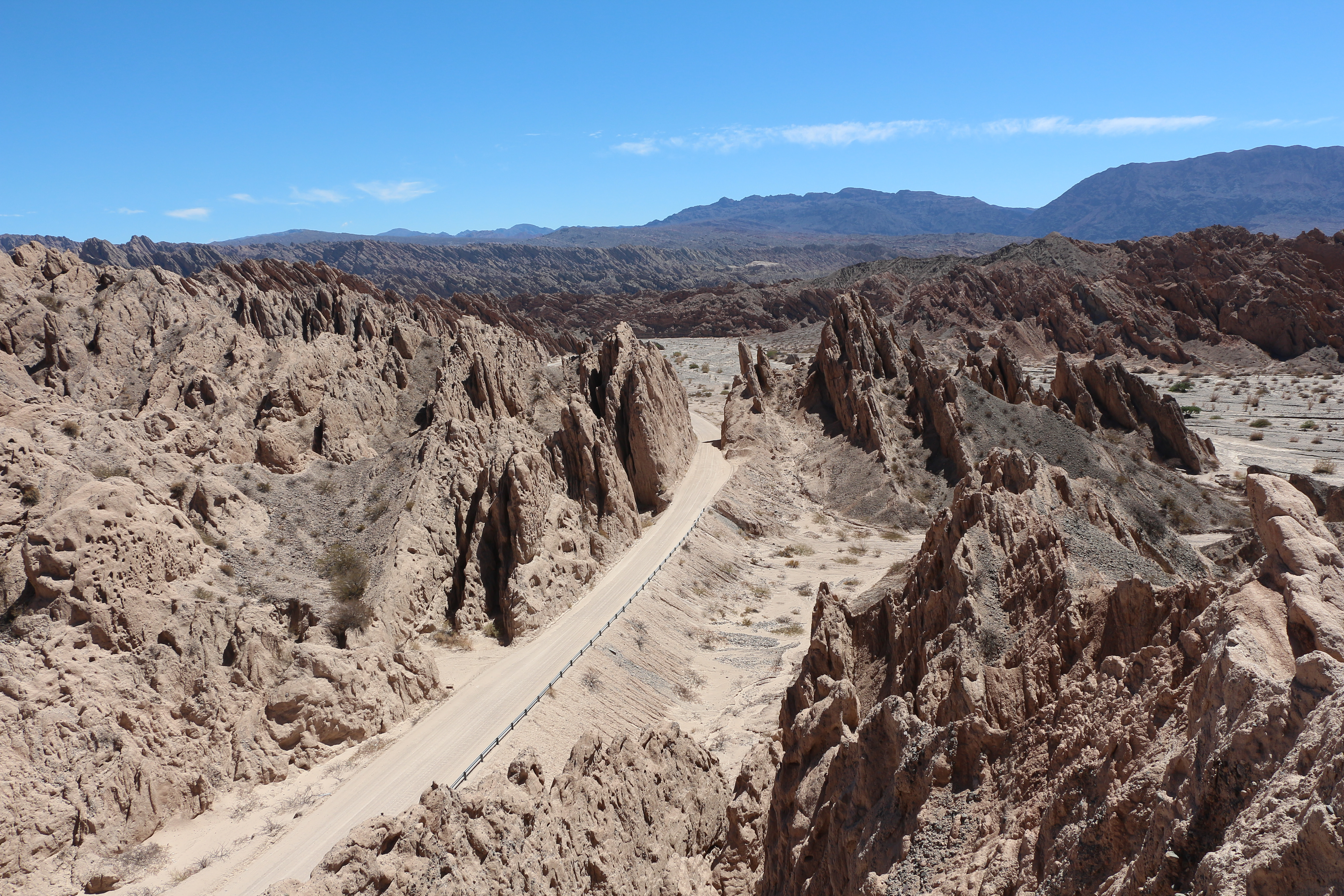
RN40 (Calchaquí Valleys)

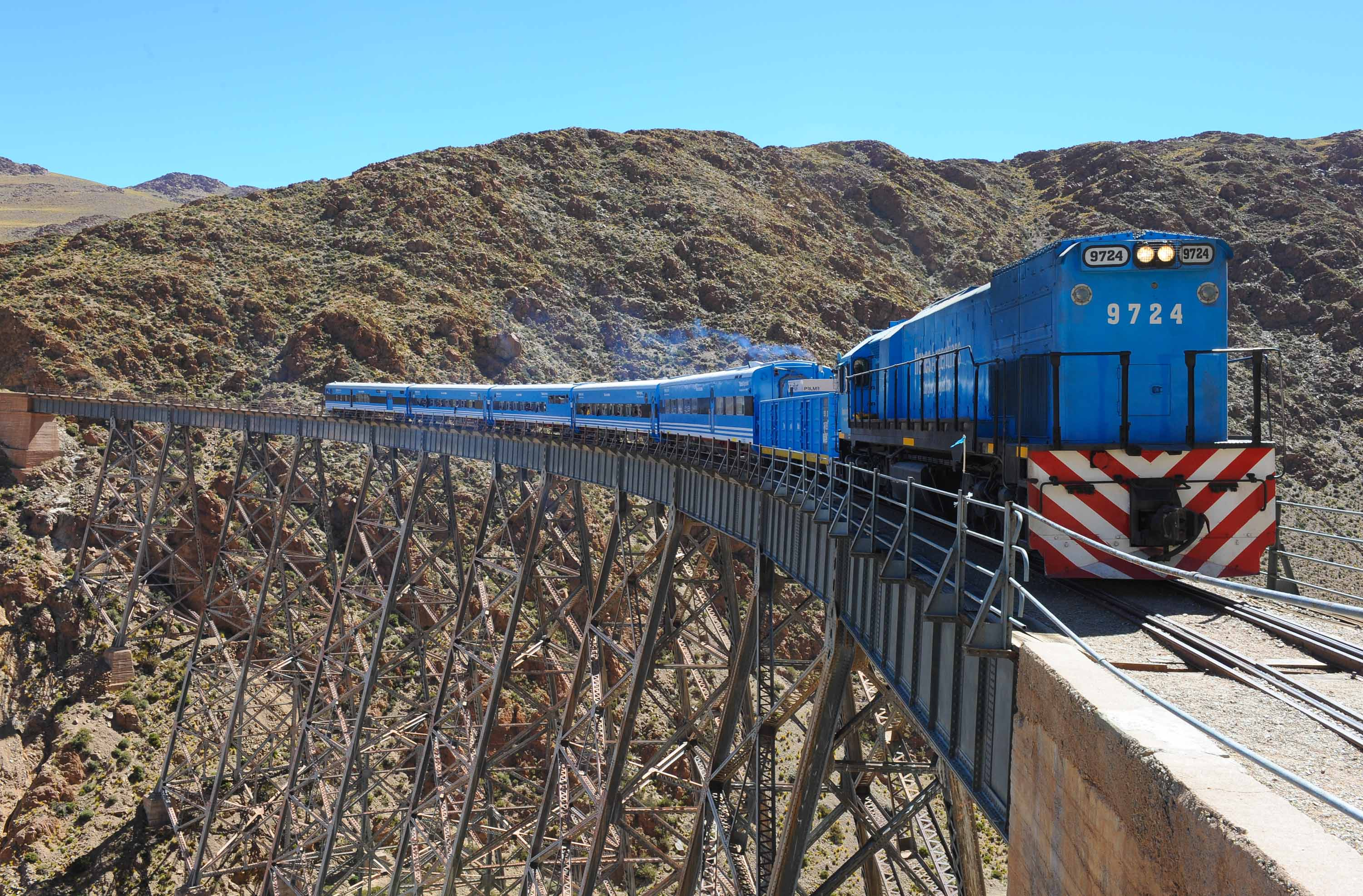
The cloud train

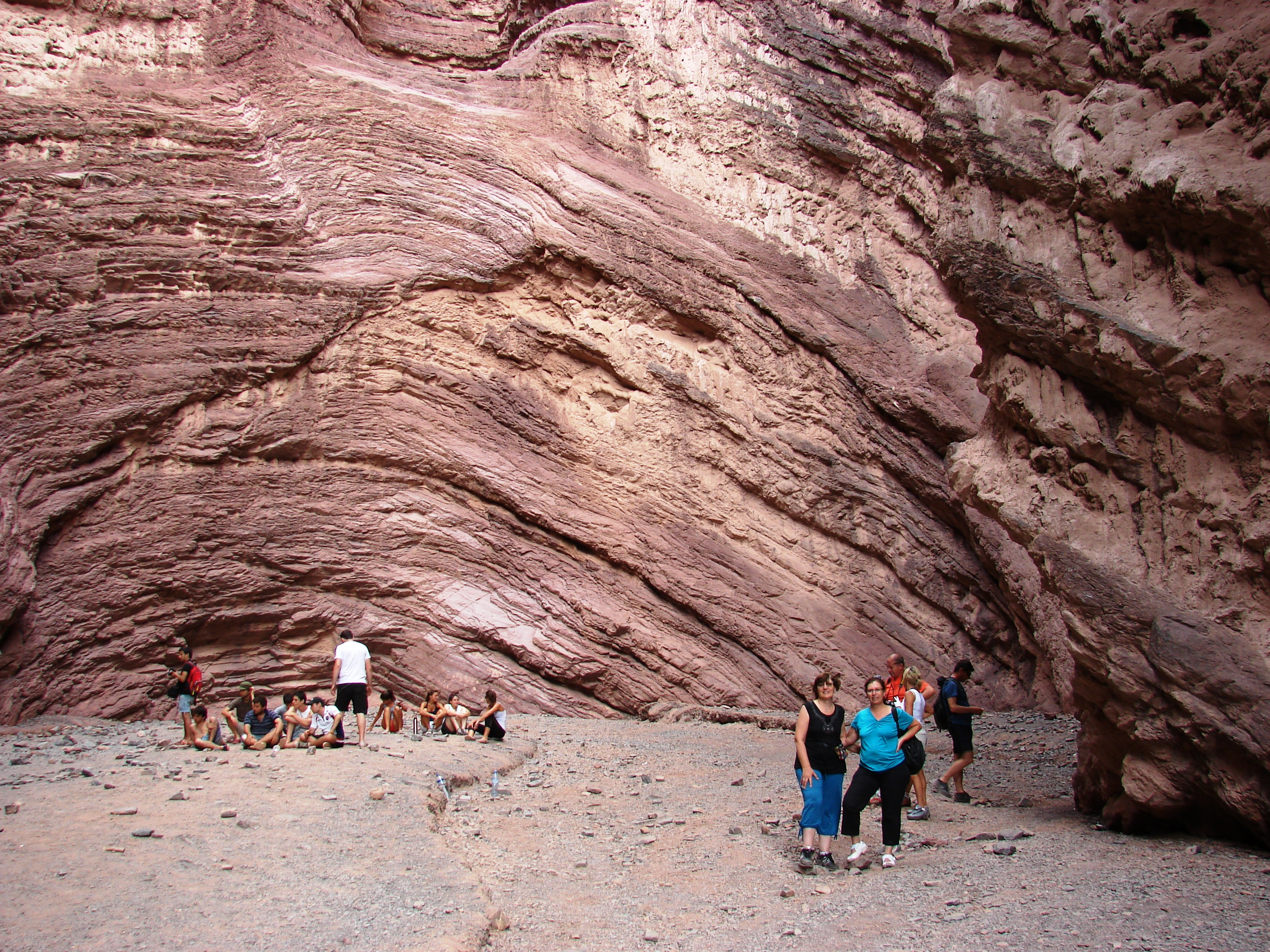
Cafayate amphitheatre

Release date: 2 October 2020

Having entered Salta province, Charley and Ewan detour from RN40 to visit the Gorge of Shells (Quebrada de las conchas) and a natural amphitheatre off RN68 near Cafayate. The entire team then heads for an excursion on the Cloud Train (Tren a las Nubes) high into the Andes. To counter the strong headwinds, Charley and Ewan slipstream a support vehicle to eke out extra range. Altitude sickness affects assistant producer Taylor, who leaves for lower altitudes and plans to rejoin them in Bolivia.

Bidding farewell to Argentina and having crossed into the Antofagasta region in Chile over the Sico Pass, the duo head across the Atacama Desert towards the border at Portezuelo del Cajón with Bolivia, stopping to admire the Salar de Atacama and the Licancabur volcano.

Holding both British and American passports, Ewan uses his US passport to exit Chile not realising that to enter Bolivia he will then require a visa. After some confusion, the team pay for a visa and they enter the altiplano to head through the Siloli Desert on gravel tracks, during which Ewan falls off his bike.

ROUTE: Belén (ARG) → Ruta Nacional 40 → Calchaquí Valley (ARG) → Ruta Nacional 40 → San Antonio de los Cobres (ARG) → Ruta Nacional 51 → Border crossing (Paso Internacional de Sico) → Ruta 23-CH → San Pedro de Atacama (CHL) → Ruta 27-CH / Ruta B-243 → Border crossing (Hito Cajon) → Ruta de las Joyas Altoandinas / Ruta Laguna Verde → Termas de Polques (BOL) → Ruta Laguna Colorada → Laguna Colorada (BOL)

=== Episode 6: "Bolivia" ===
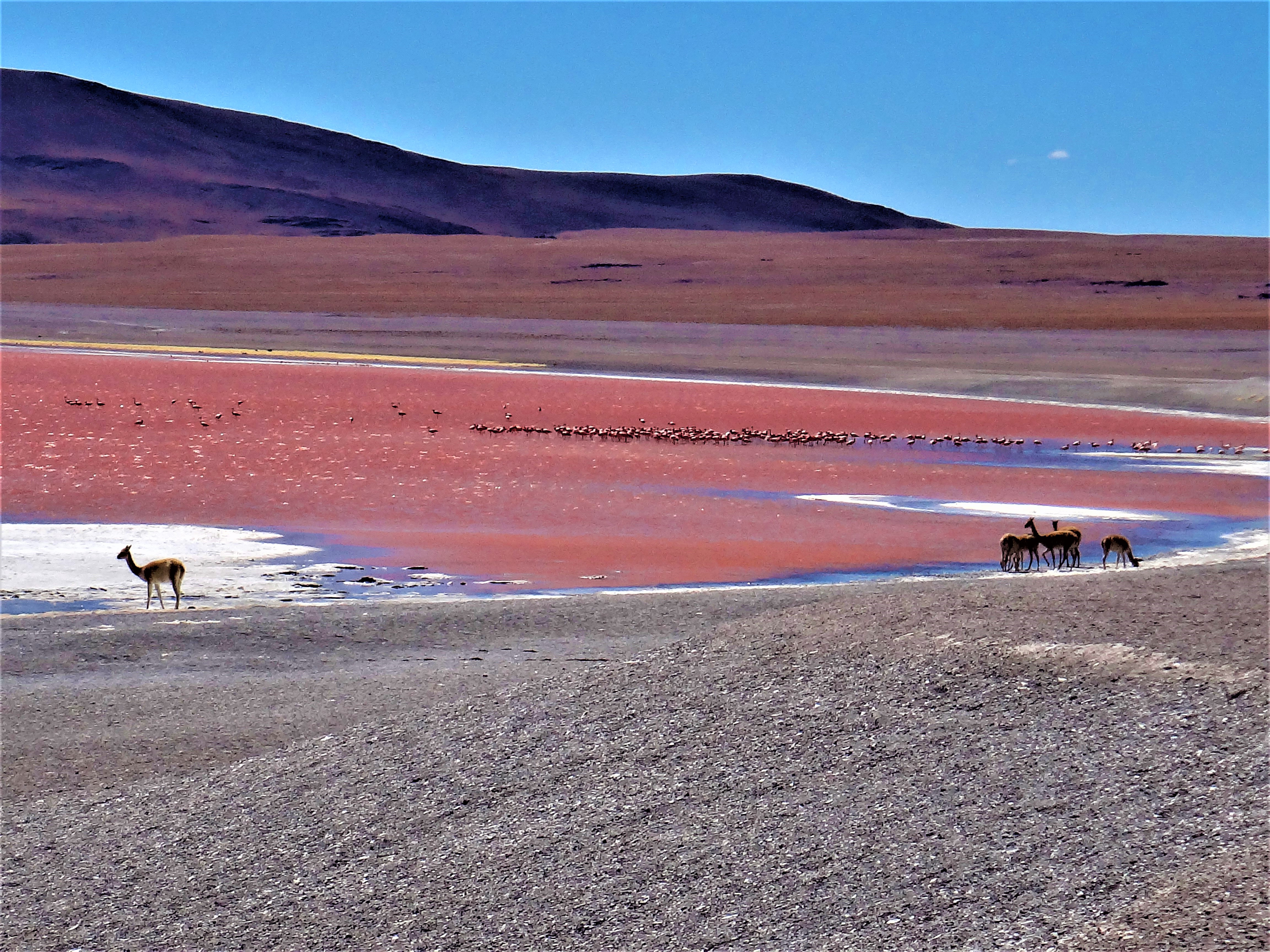
Blood of the Gods lake

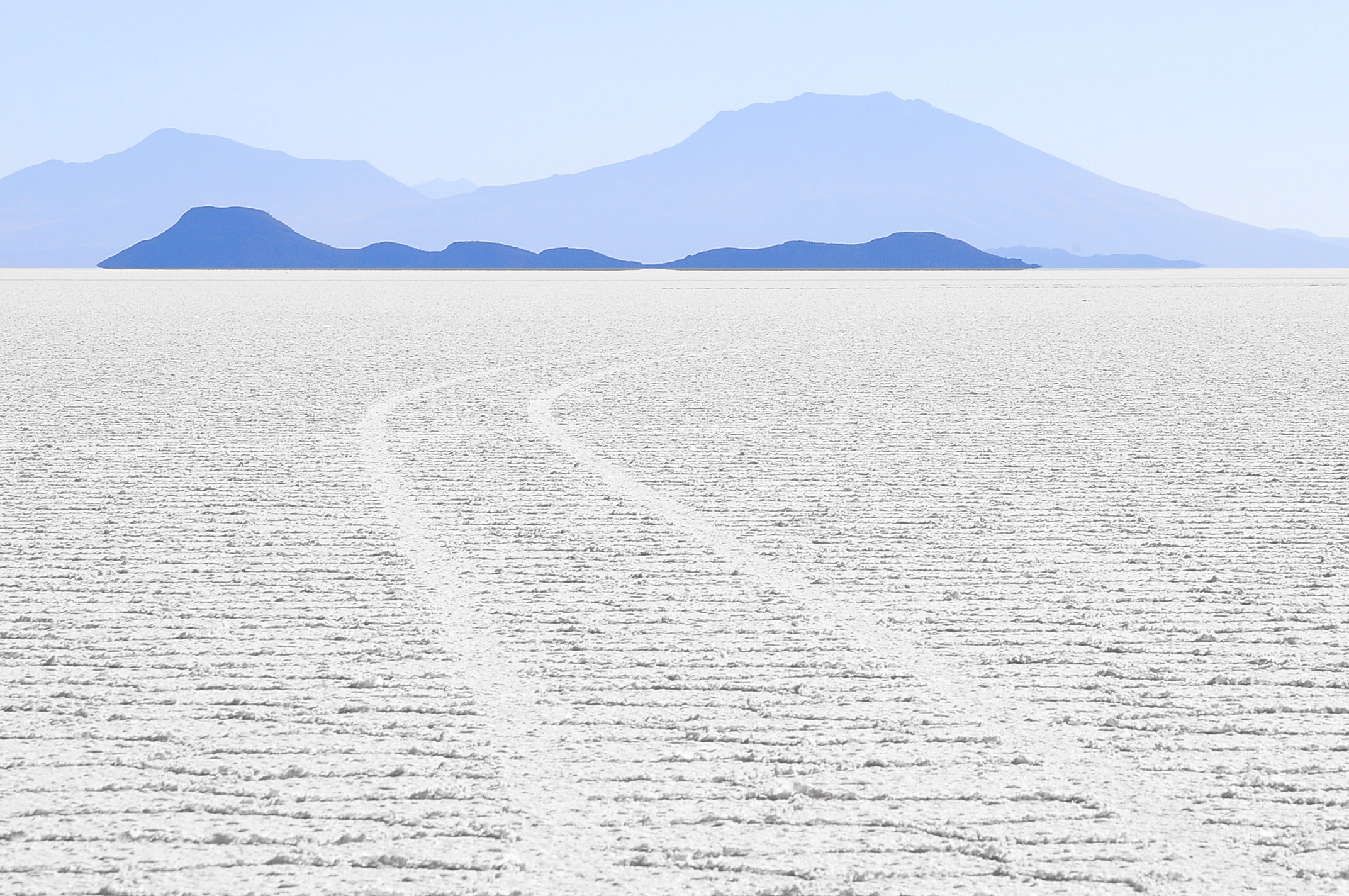
Uyuni Salt Flats

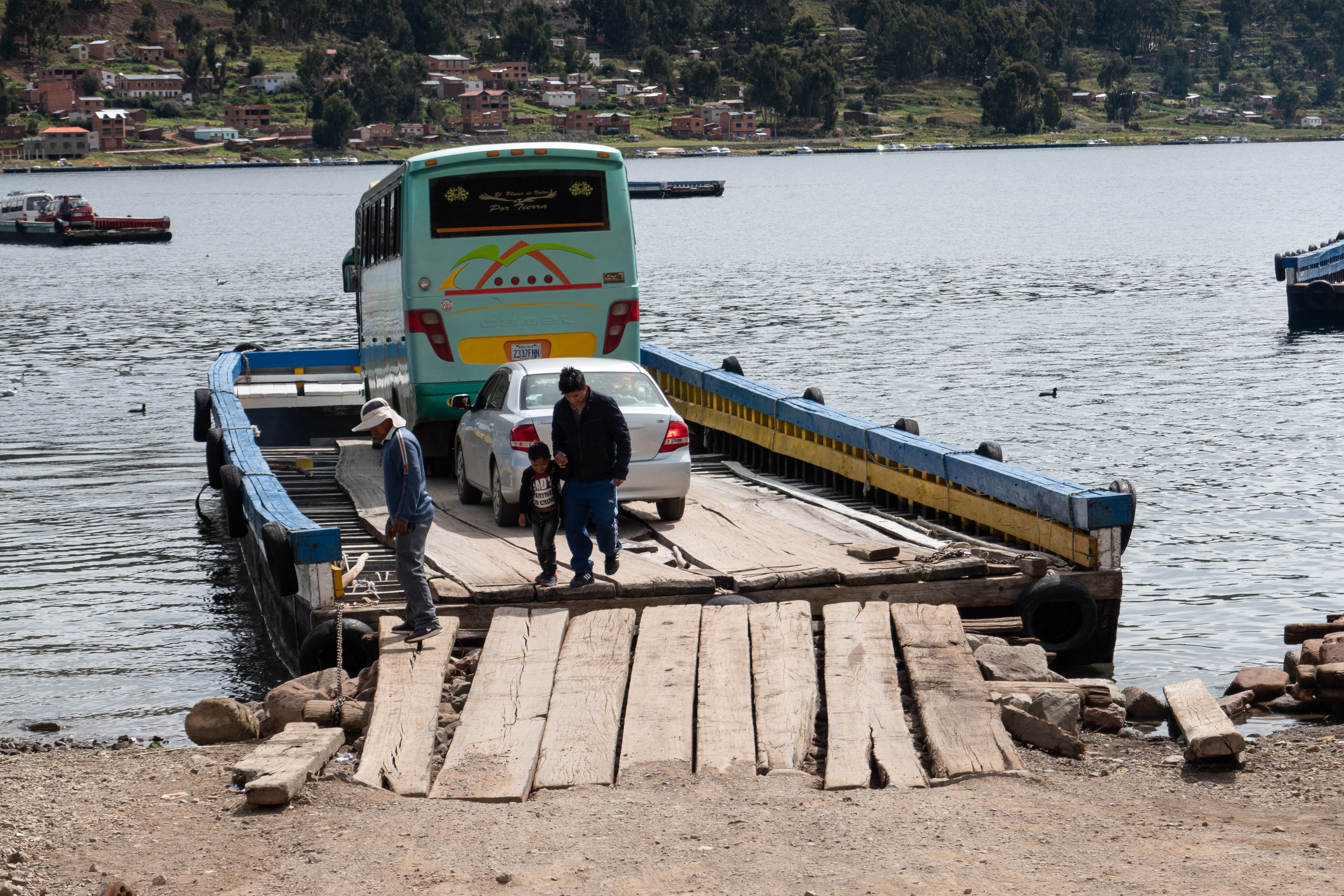
Barge across Lake Titicaca

Release date: 9 October 2020

Setting off from the refuge near Laguna Colorada after nightfall in a bid to reach a charging station, one of the R1Ts runs out of charge and has to be tow-charged. The other suffers damage to its suspension and parking brake. In daylight, Charley and Ewan press on through the Siloli Desert, past the Blood of the Gods lake but find the terrain ever more sandy. Charley takes a tumble but is not seriously hurt. Having set off against the advice of Rivian, without a fully functional braking system, David finds his R1T rolling back on an incline and wedging on a rock with a hydraulic oil leak. Near Challapata, Charley and Ewan visit the UNICEF backed Challamayu School for indigenous Quechua children, where they are taught in both Spanish and their native tongue, helping to preserve the Quechuan language and cultural identity.

At La Paz the pair visit GustuBar, a restaurant that began as a school for under-privileged kids, some of whom have gone on to become successful chefs. Taylor has devised a solution which detects a live electric current to alert them whenever charging has stopped with an audible alarm.

At Lake Titicaca, after another challenging day of riding, Ewan and Taylor start to feel the effects of altitude sickness, culminating in a visit by the team doctor.

ROUTE: Laguna Colorada (BOL) → Ruta Laguna Colorada / Ruta 701 / Ruta 5 → Uyuni (BOL) → Ruta 30 → Salar de Uyuni (BOL) → Ruta 30 → Challapata (BOL) → Ruta 1 / Ruta 4 / Ruta 1 → La Paz (BOL) → Ruta 1 → El Alto (BOL) → Ruta 2 → Lake Titicaca (BOL) → Ferry (barge) / Ruta 2 → Copacabana (BOL)

=== Episode 7: "Peru" ===
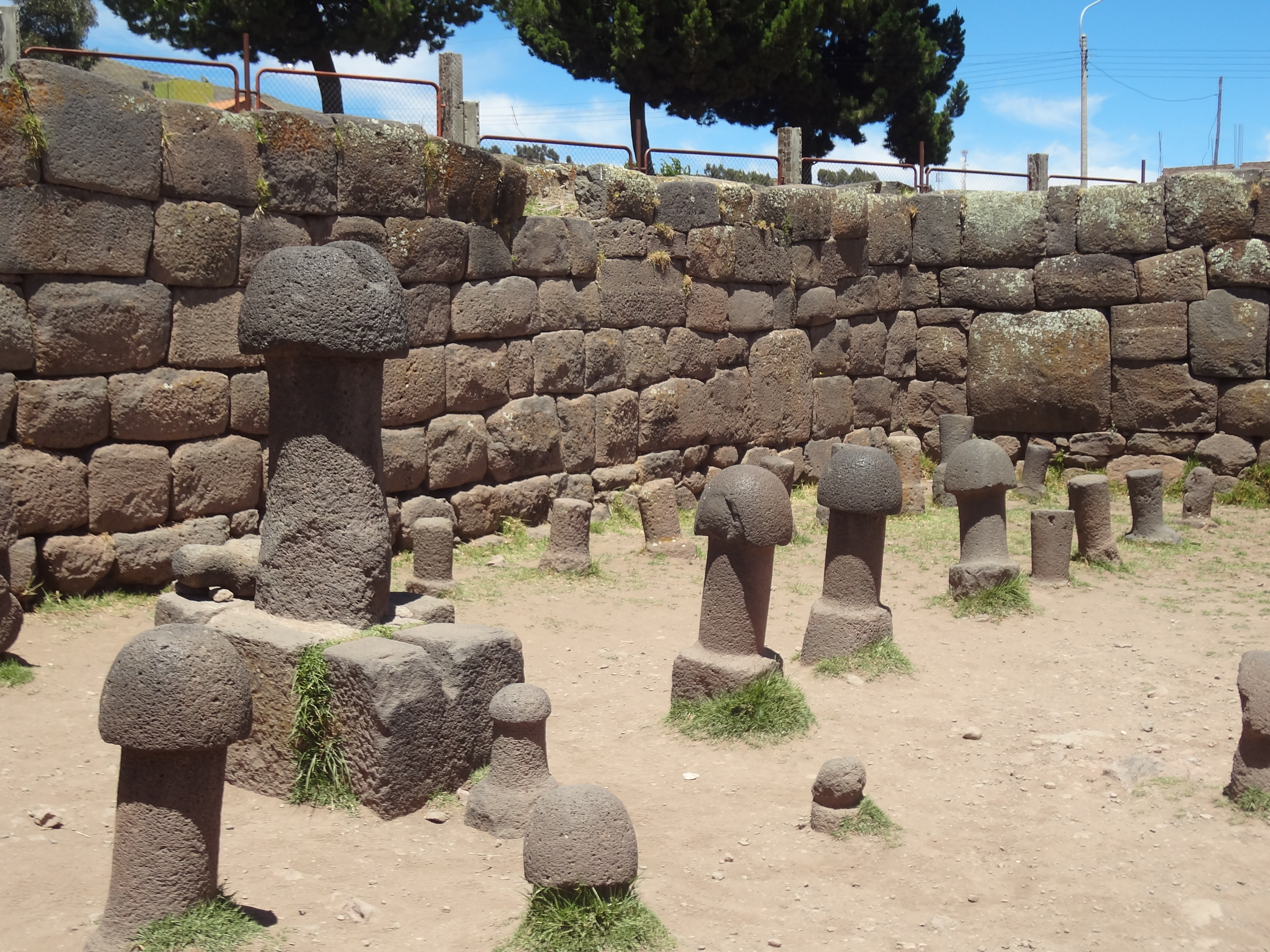
The Temple of Fertility at Inca Uyo

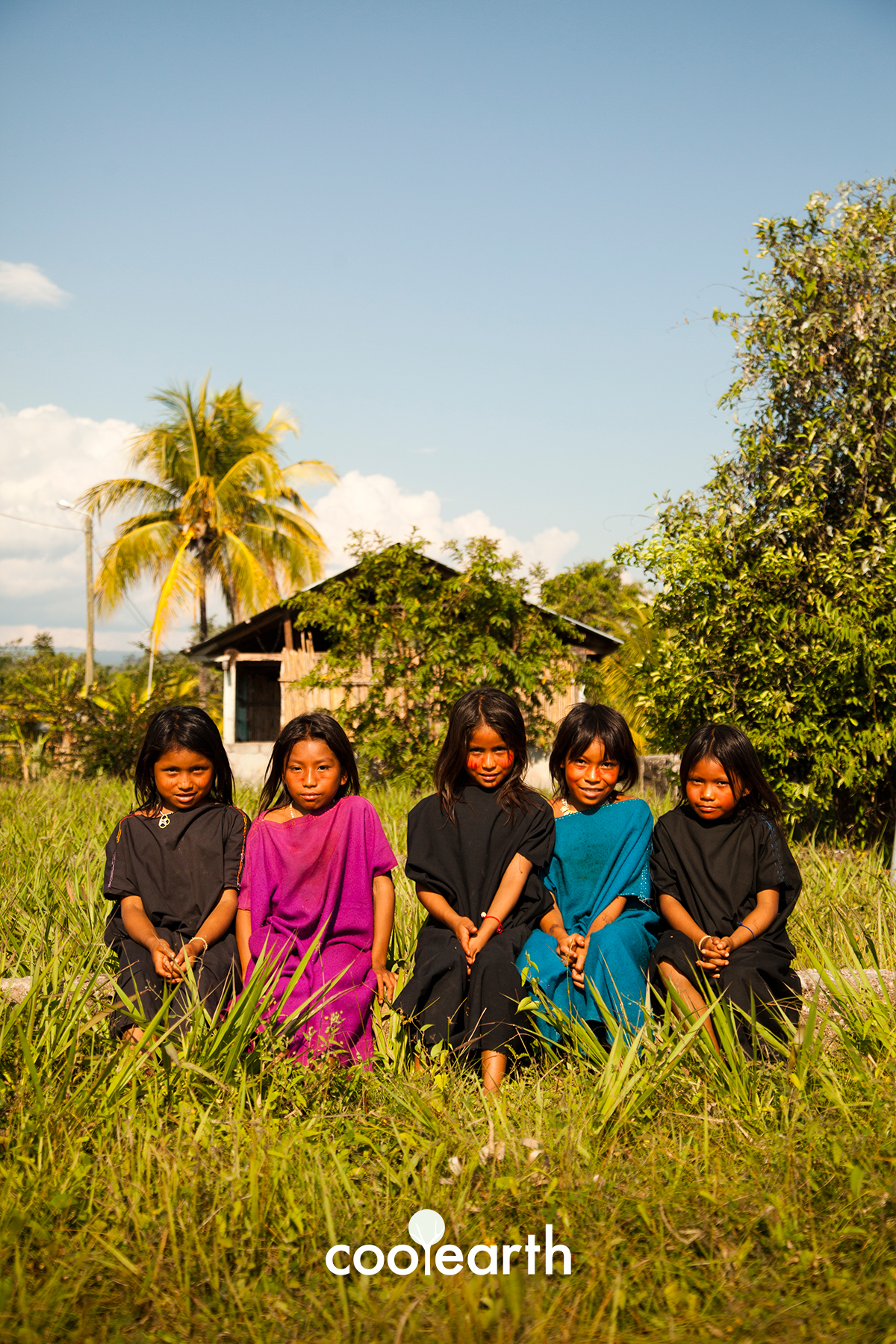
Asháninka children in Cutivireni

Release date: 16 October 2020

Having crossed into Peru, Charley and Ewan stop at Inca Uyo, a pre-columbian site with stone-carved phalluses near Chucuito. On the outskirts of Cusco they visit the Ccochahuasi animal sanctuary where they see Condors and Andean Geese. After reaching Ollantaytambo the team takes an overnight train to Aguas Calientes, the nearest town to Machu Picchu. The site is shrouded in mist, but once the clouds lift, the site makes a lasting impression.

On day 39 they depart Ollantaytambo for Ayacucho, where they hope to meet a tribal community in the rainforest near Cutivireni. En route Ewan has another fall. On Ruta 3S they meet Peruvian Para-cyclist Yuber Pichihua Perez. In Ayacucho, they leave the motorbikes and travel the final 90-mile (140 km) into the rainforest by helicopter to meet the Asháninka people who are trying to reduce deforestation and promote sustainability with the assistance of the NGO Cool Earth. In the village of Tinkareni the pair witnesses how the nomadic tribe has put down roots in twelve settlements and become the guardians of the forest. Back on the road, they continue to Ica, and take a light aircraft to see the Nazca Lines. Before leaving Peru they visit UNICEF at a refugee camp in Tumbes assisting children fleeing Venezuela. Meanwhile, Rivian engineers add a feature that allows the motorbikes to charge from the R1Ts' batteries using vehicle-to-load (VTL) circuitry in just two hours.

ROUTE: Copacabana (BOL) → Ruta 2 → Border crossing (Khasani) → Ruta 130 / Ruta Nacional 3S → Chucuito (PER) → Ruta Nacional 3S → Puno (PER) → Ruta Nacional 3S → Cusco (PER) → Ruta Nacional 28G / Ruta Nacional 28B → Ollantaytambo (PER) → Ruta 110 / Ruta Nacional 3S → Andahuaylas (PER) → Ruta Nacional 3S → Ayacucho (PER) → Ruta Nacional 28A / Ruta Nacional 1S → Ica (PER) → Ruta Nacional 1S / Ruta Nacional 1N → Tumbes (PER) → Ruta Nacional 1N → Border crossing (Aguas Verdes)

=== Episode 8: "Ecuador" ===
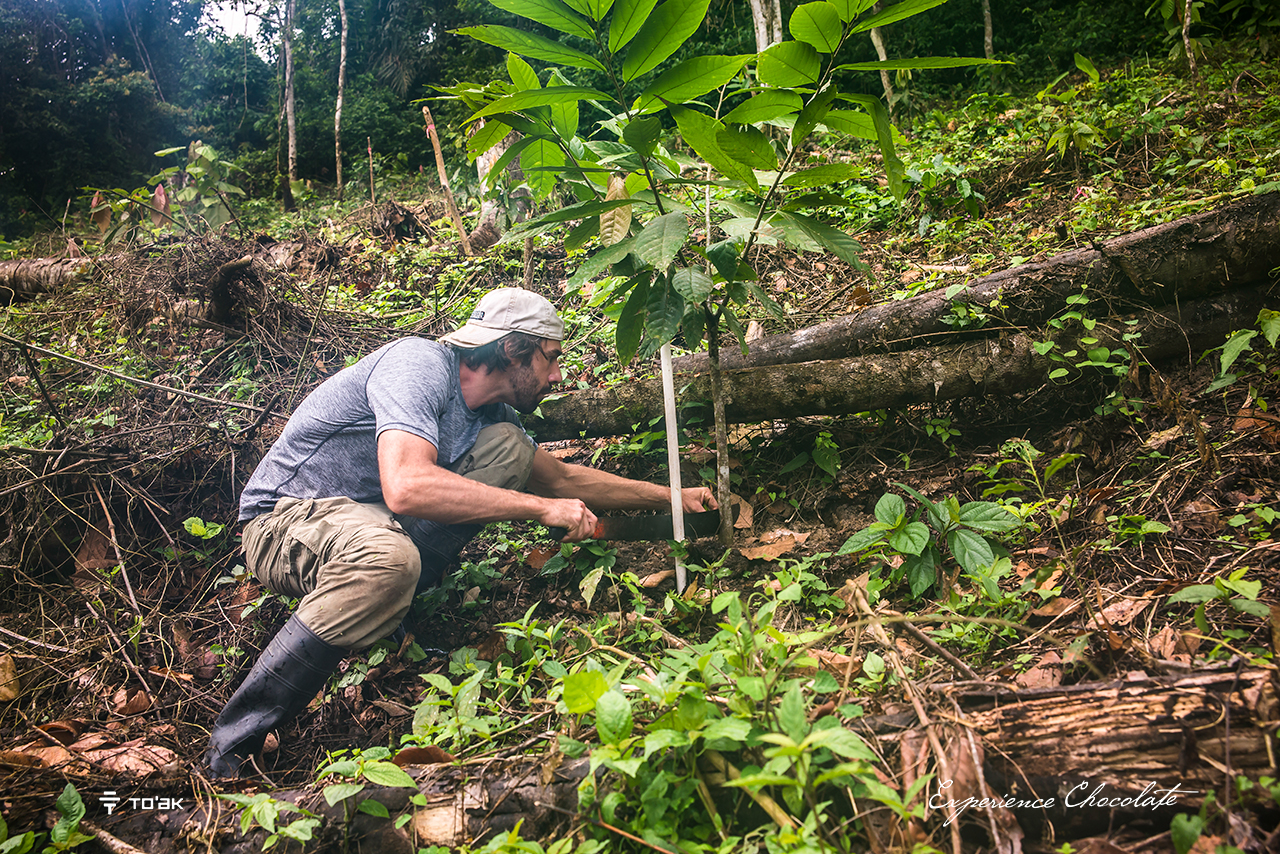
Jerry Toth of TMA

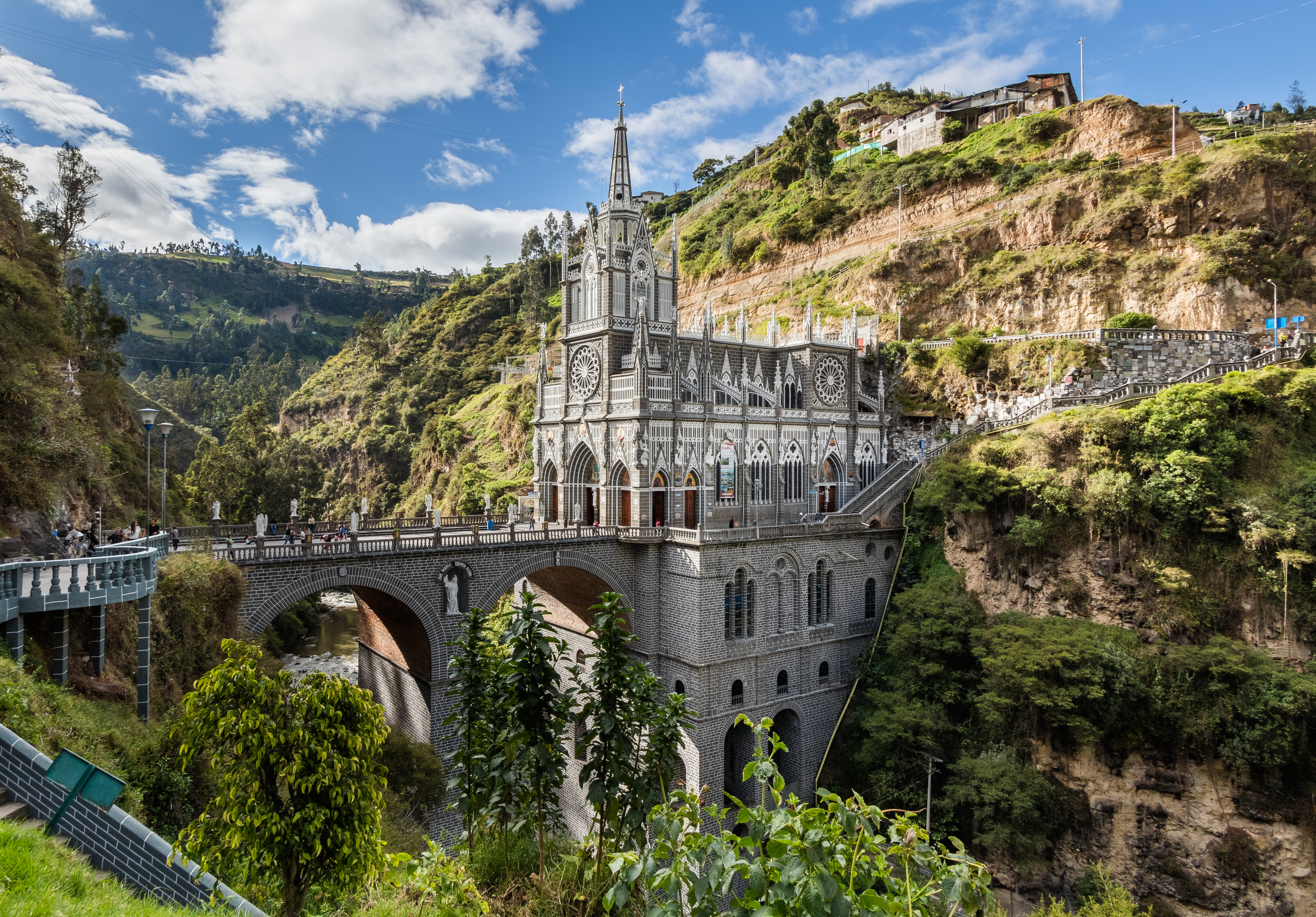
Las Lajas Shrine

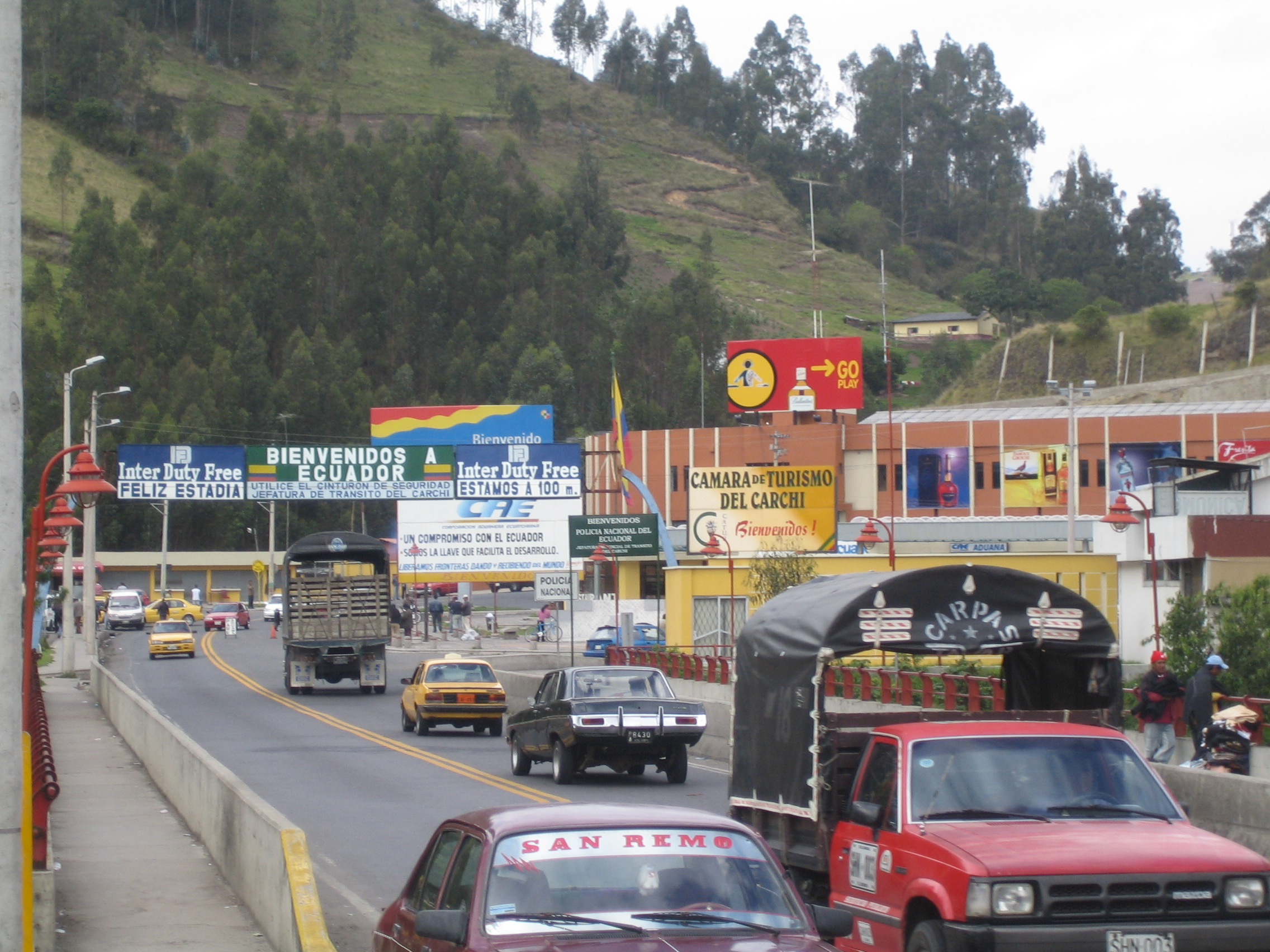
Rumichaca Bridge

Release date: 23 October 2020

Charley and Ewan are mobbed in Guayaquil by Star Wars fans. In Montecristi they see Panama hats being made by hand in a local factory, and then head to what's left of the coastal rainforest to visit a reforesting initiative led by the Third Millennium Alliance (TMA). The jungle had lost more than 90% of its vegetation before the conservancy intervened. With the tree cover returning, the pair spot Howler monkeys and hummingbirds.

The production team meanwhile makes for the port of Esmeraldas to drop their vehicles for shipping to Panama City, to avoid the impassable Darién Gap.

In Tulcán, near the border with Colombia, Ewan's motorbike throws up an error message. A hard reboot fails to clear it. Tele-support from Harley-Davidson HQ diagnoses that the BMS failed during a software update, and either a replacement motorbike or traction battery are the only options, best done in Panama. A revised plan involves flying from Pasto to Buenaventura and then sailing up the coast to Bahía Solano, where another flight will take them onto Panama City. With his motorbike now on the back of a tow truck, Ewan commandeers Claudio's bike with Claudio riding pillion. At the border, they have difficulties with Customs until it is pointed out that Obi-Wan is in danger of missing his plane. En route to Pasto they detour to the Las Lajas Shrine, at the site of a vision of the Virgin Mary. Delayed at Pasto airport due to bad weather, the team looks unlikely to make the boat.

ROUTE: El Oro (ECU) → Ruta E25 → Guayaquil (ECU) → Ruta 482 → Montecristi (ECU) → Ruta E15 → Jama-Coaque Ecological Reserve (ECU) → Ruta E30 / Ruta E25 / Ruta E20 / Ruta E35 → Tulcán (ECU) → Ruta E35 → Border crossing (Rumichaca) → Ruta 25 → Pasto (COL)

=== Episode 9: "Colombia, Panama & Costa Rica" ===
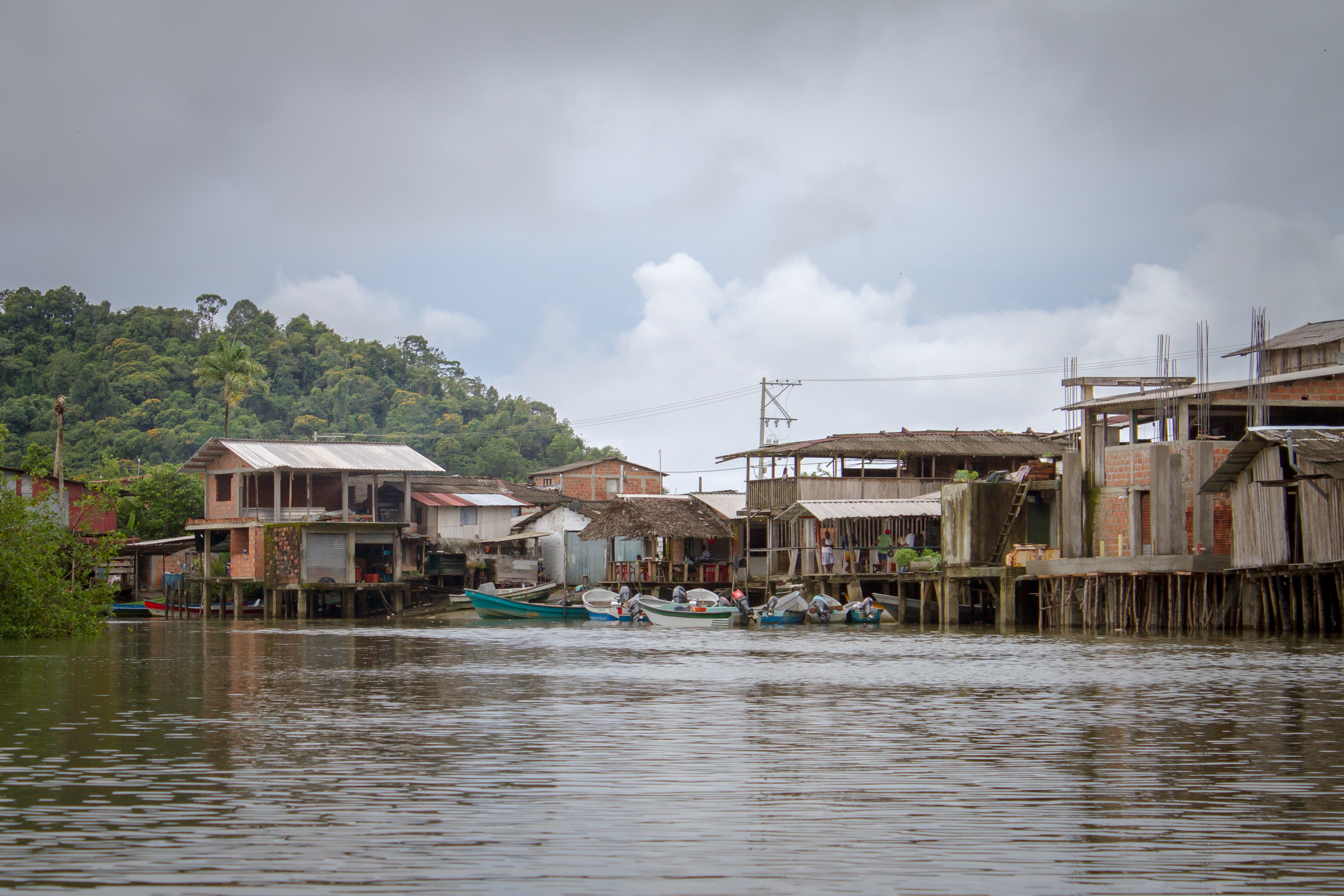
The village of Nuquí, Colombia

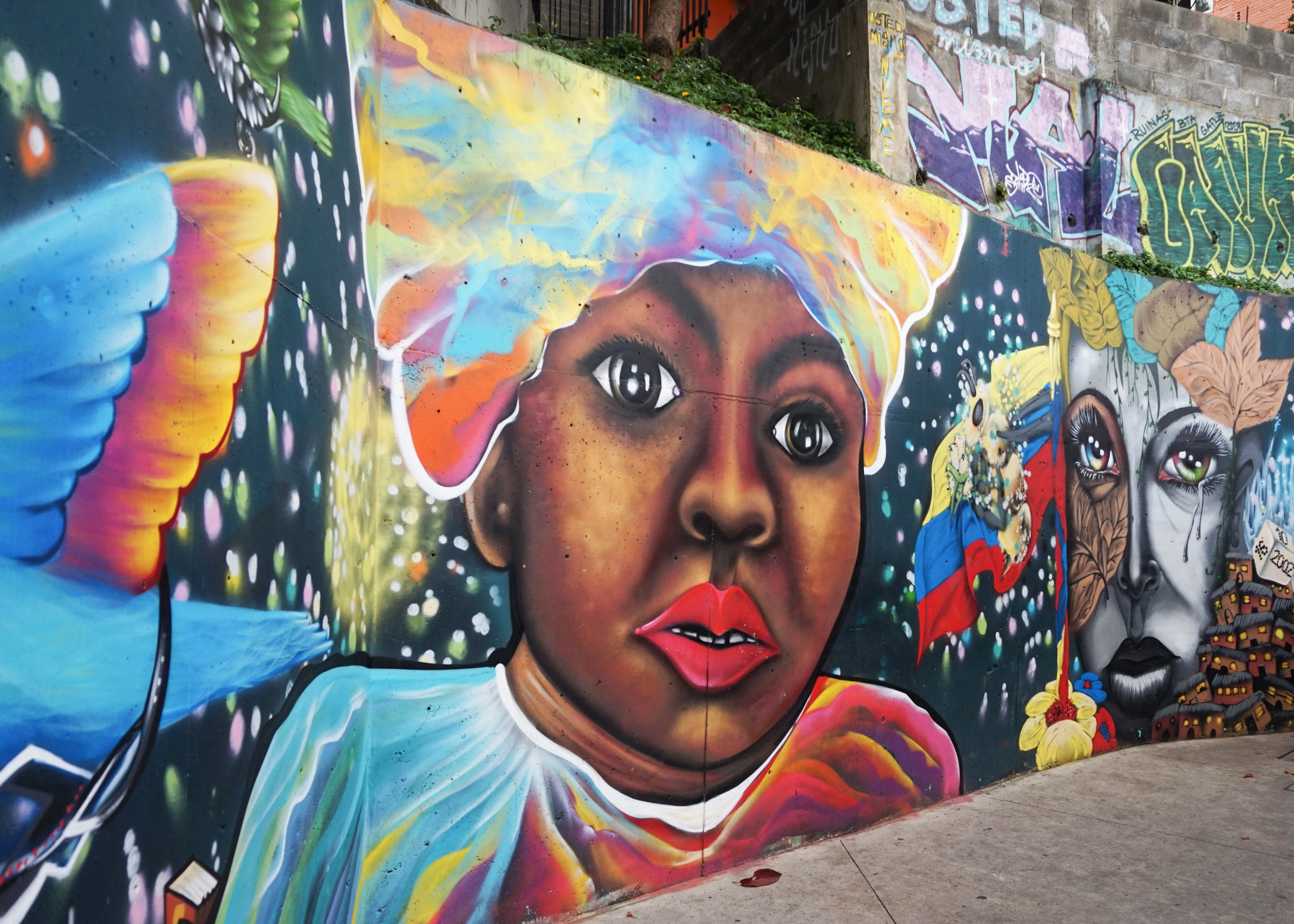
Street art in Comuna 13, Medellín

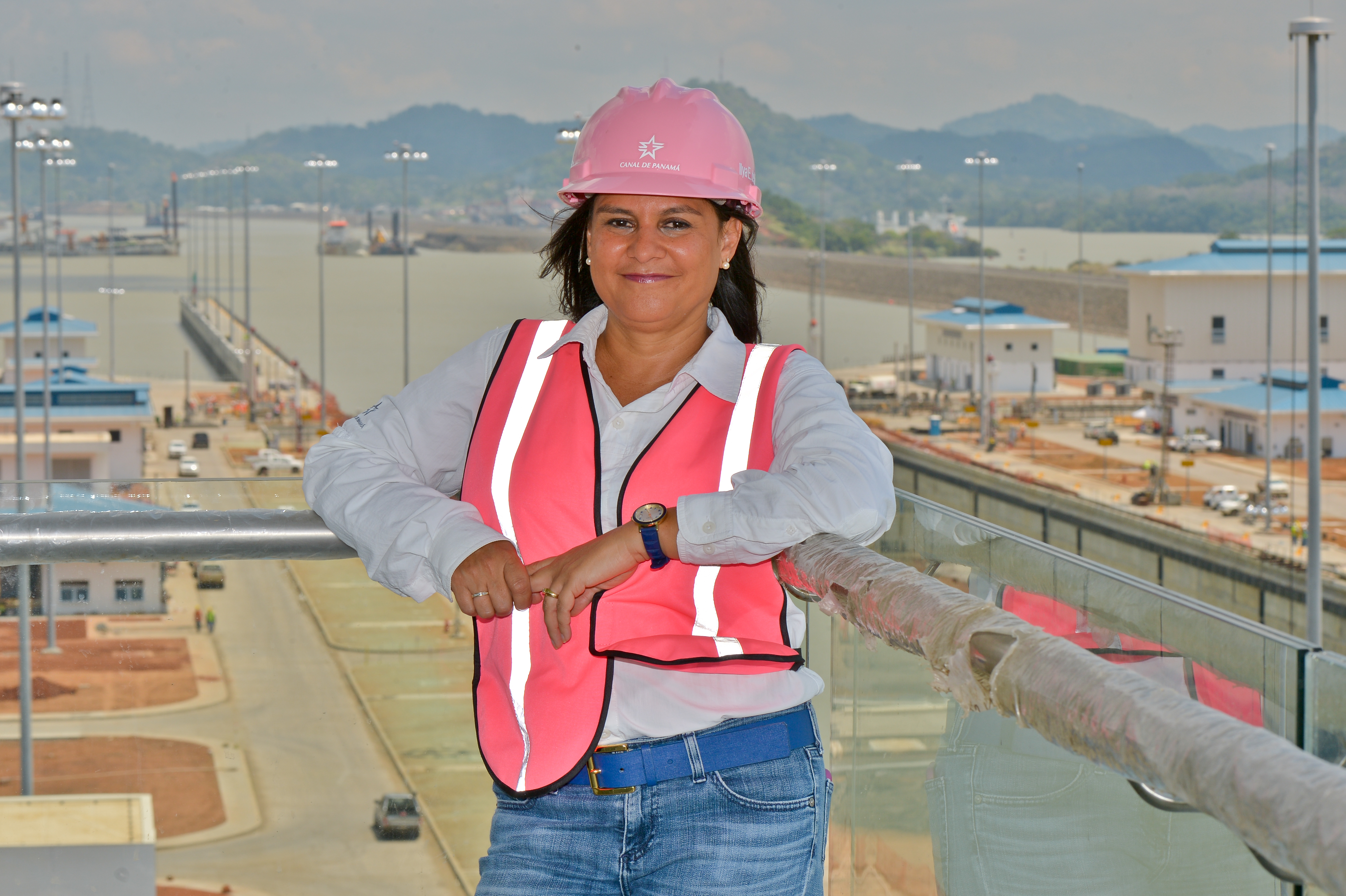
Ilya Espino de Marotta

Release date: 30 October 2020

At Buenaventura, the team is concerned the rusting old fishing vessel they are directed to is not the vessel they had seen in photos, but find themselves with no choice but to accept what is on offer. The boat stops at several isolated coastal villages in the Chocó region to trade supplies, and the team takes the opportunity to explore one called Nuquí. News arrives that the parts for Ewan's bike will be shipped to Costa Rica, so he decides to rush ahead there, leaving Charley to navigate Panama alone.

Whilst waiting for the chartered plane, they head to a beach at El Valle. As the cargo plane is not permitted to take cross-border passengers, they alight in Medellín, but Ewan is granted crew status so he can stay on board to Panama. However, Customs formalities create an overnight delay. While Ewan accompanies the bikes, Charley explores Medellín, visiting Comuna 13 (San Javier) and meeting local street artist Yesgraff.

Arriving in Panama, Ewan loads his bike onto a pick-up truck for the drive to San José through the Puntarenas region. Charley collects his bike when he lands later that day and heads to the Panama Ship Canal to meet Ilya, the female chief of engineering, and to recreate a scene from The Tailor of Panama which had been directed by his father. He then meets a fellow Harley-Davidson enthusiast Pachanga Russell in Chiriquí province who is 85 years old. After a strip-down and rebuild overnight, having a functional motorbike once again, Ewan seeks out Charley who has arrived in San Jose.

ROUTE: Pasto (COL) → Plane (Let L-410UVP-E Turbolet) → Buenaventura (COL) → Boat (MC01457 Dani) → Bahía Solano (COL) → Plane (Antonov AN-26B) → Medellín (COL) → Plane → Panama City (PAN) → Ruta 1 (Pan-American Highway) → [Charley alone; Chiriquí (PAN)] → Ruta 1 / Ruta Nacional Primaria 2 → San José (CRI)

=== Episode 10: "Nicaragua, Honduras, Guatemala & Mexico" ===
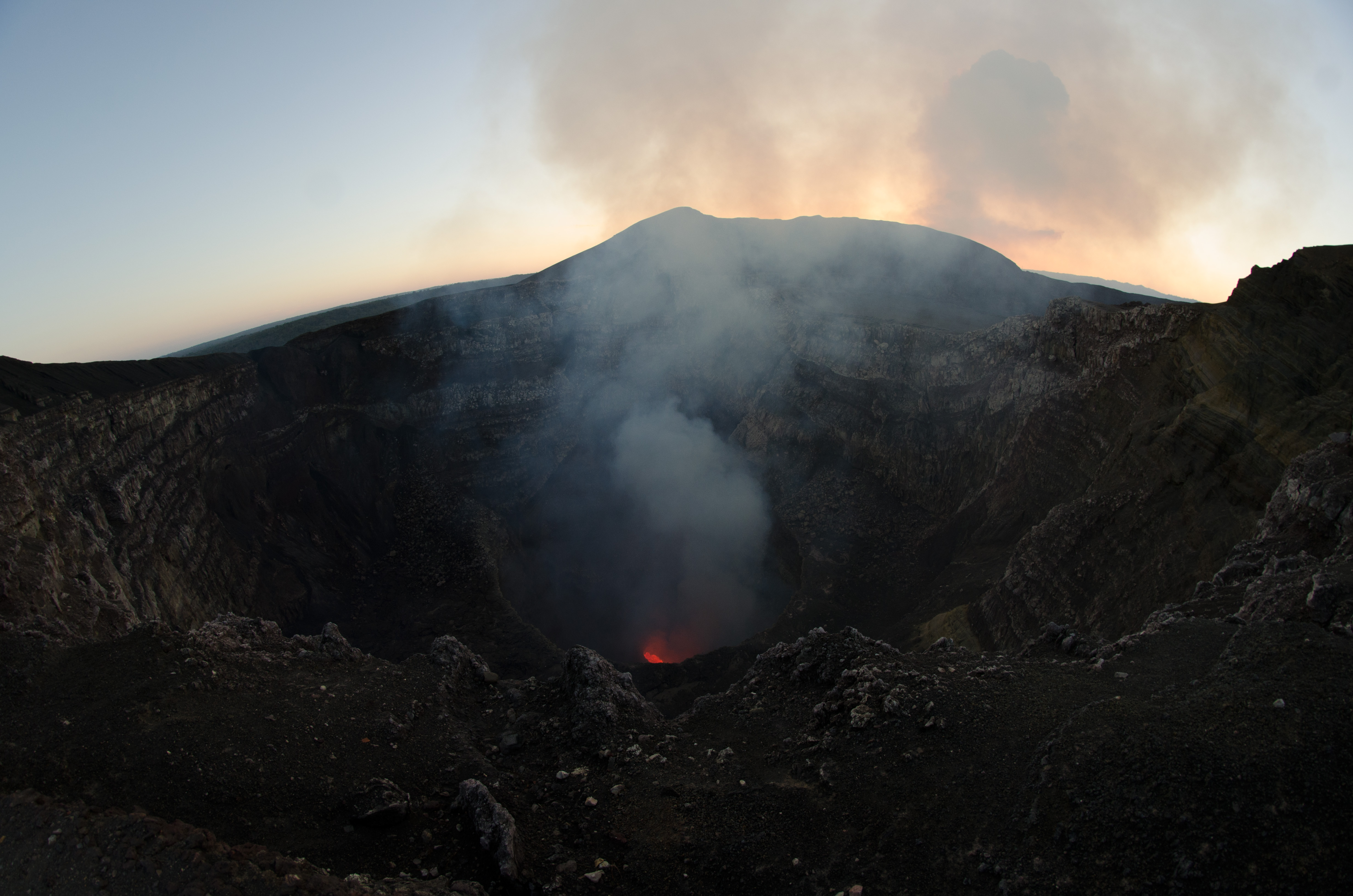
Masaya Volcano, Nicaragua

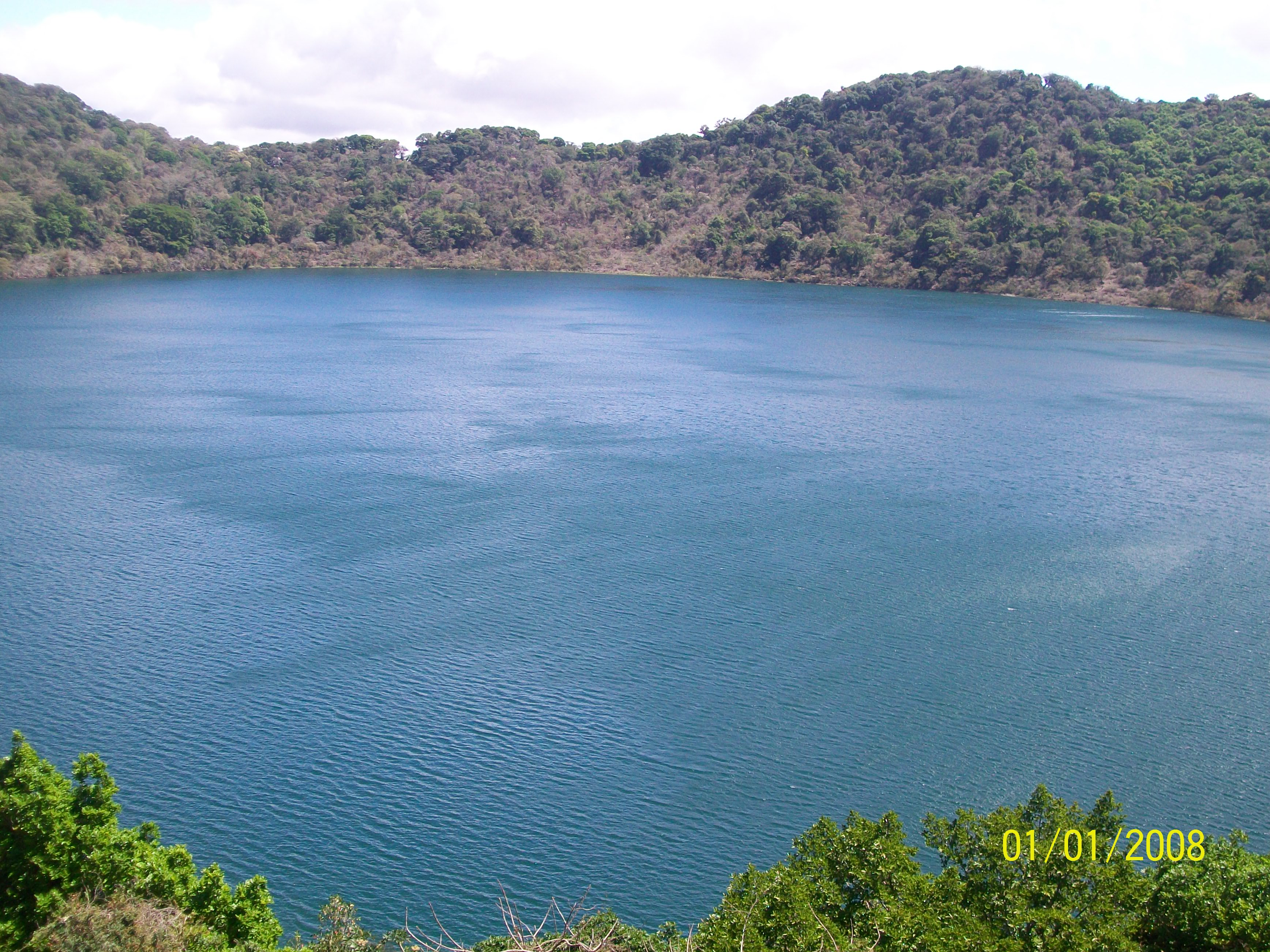
Lake Ipala, Guatemala

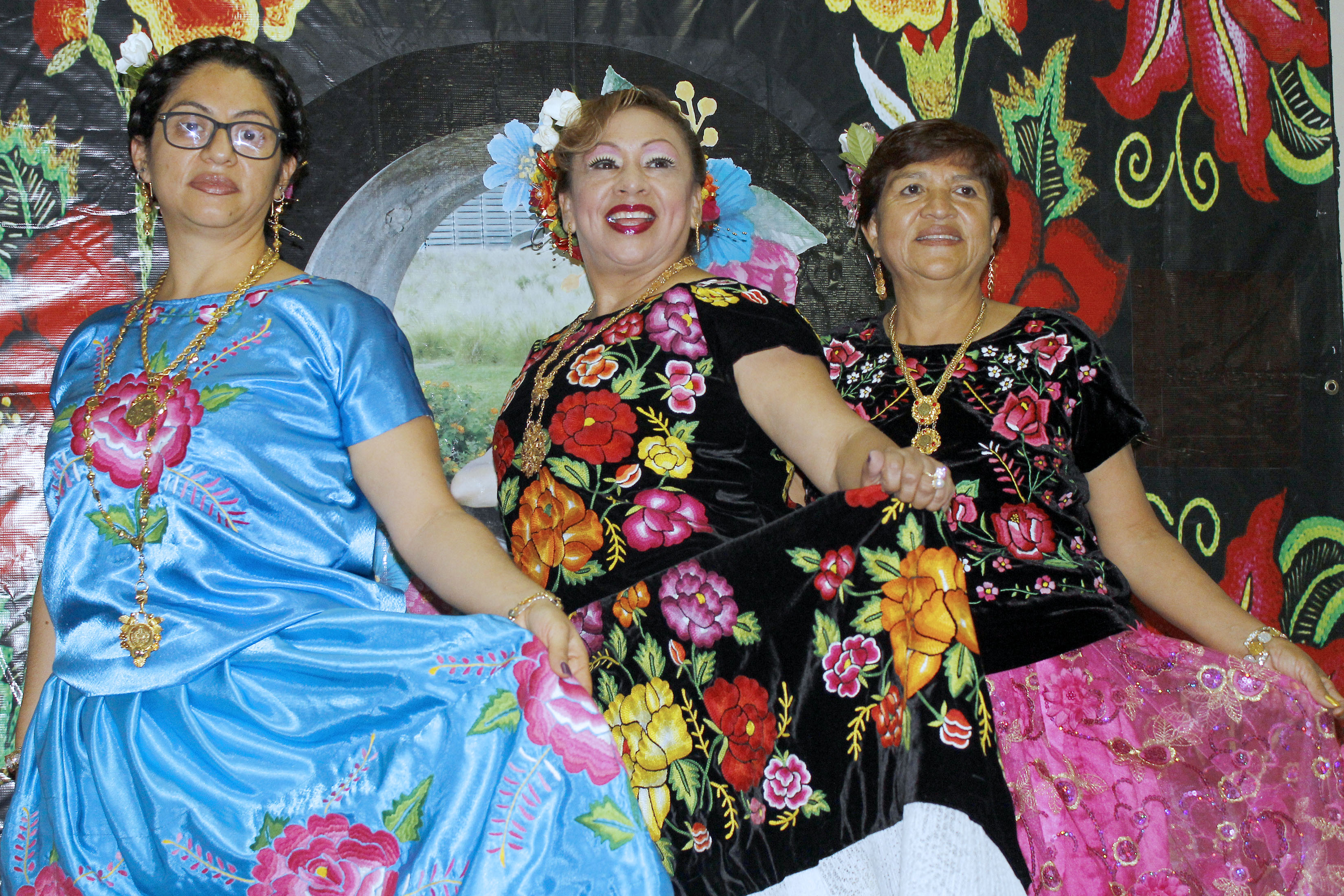
Zapotec Muxes

Release date: 6 November 2020

Reunited, Charley and Ewan ride through Guanacaste province on the Costa Rican Pacific coast, towards Playa Hermosa. Here Ewan introduces his daughter Jamyan, an orphan from Mongolia he adopted after Long Way Round. She accompanies them on a visit to the active Masaya volcano in Nicaragua, and then through Central America to the Mexican border.

In Honduras, Charley and Ewan visit a UNICEF project at the Centro de Alcance Juvenil Japón, which helps children escape from the cycle of gang violence. Crossing into Guatemala, they head for the extinct Ipala volcano, camping beside Lake Ipala, its flooded caldera, and taking a swim.

The team re-evalautes the safest way to travel through Mexico because of drug cartel activity, and decide to ride by day, loading the bikes onto a bus that would travel at night. At San Cristóbal de las Casas, Charley and Ewan head to the Pacific coast towards Chahuites, whilst some of the support team go ahead to Oaxaca to look for a suitable bus. In Tehuantepec, Charley and Ewan meet some Muxes from the indigenous Zapotec people. In Oaxaca, with a bus acquired, the support team gets to work on making it roadworthy.

ROUTE: San José (CRI) → Ruta Nacional Primaria 1 / Ruta NP21 → Playa Hermosa (CRI) → Ruta NP1 → Border crossing (Peñas Blancas) → Ruta 1 / Ruta 4 → Granada (NIC) → ? → Border crossing (Guasaule) → Ruta CA-3 / Ruta RN-112 / Ruta CA-5 → San Pedro Sula (HND) → Ruta CA-13 → Choloma (HND) → Ruta CA-4 / Ruta CA-11 → Border crossing (El Florido) → Ruta CA-11 / Ruta 18 → Ipala → ? / Ruta 1 → Panajachel (GTM) → Ruta CA-1 → Border crossing (La Mesilla) → Carretera Federal 190 → San Cristóbal de las Casas (MEX) → Carretera Federal 190 → Chahuites (MEX) → Carretera Federal 190 / Carretera Federal 185 → Tehuantepec (MEX) → Carretera Federal 190 → Oaxaca (MEX)

=== Episode 11: "Oaxaca to L.A." ===
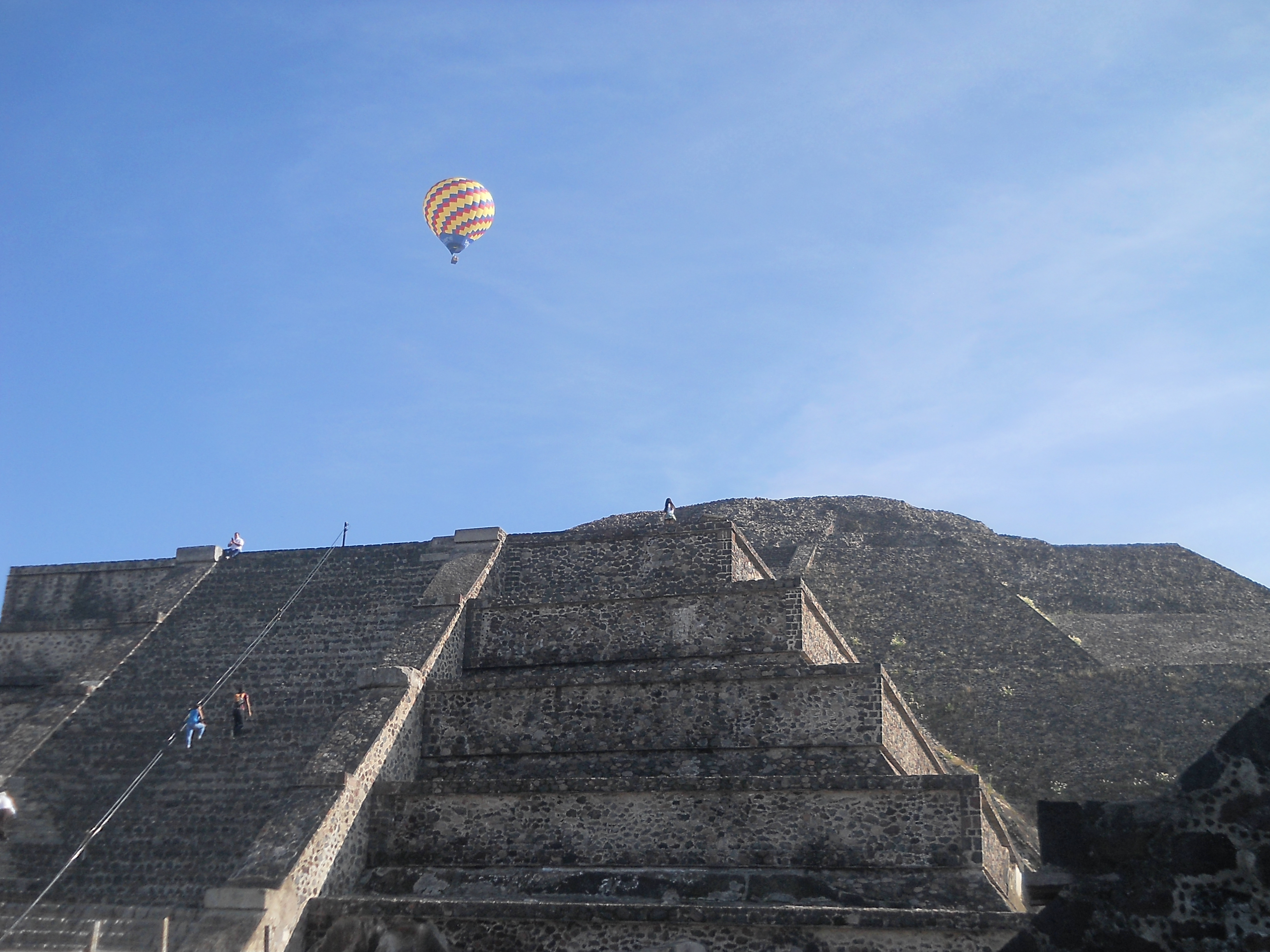
Teotihuacan, Mexico

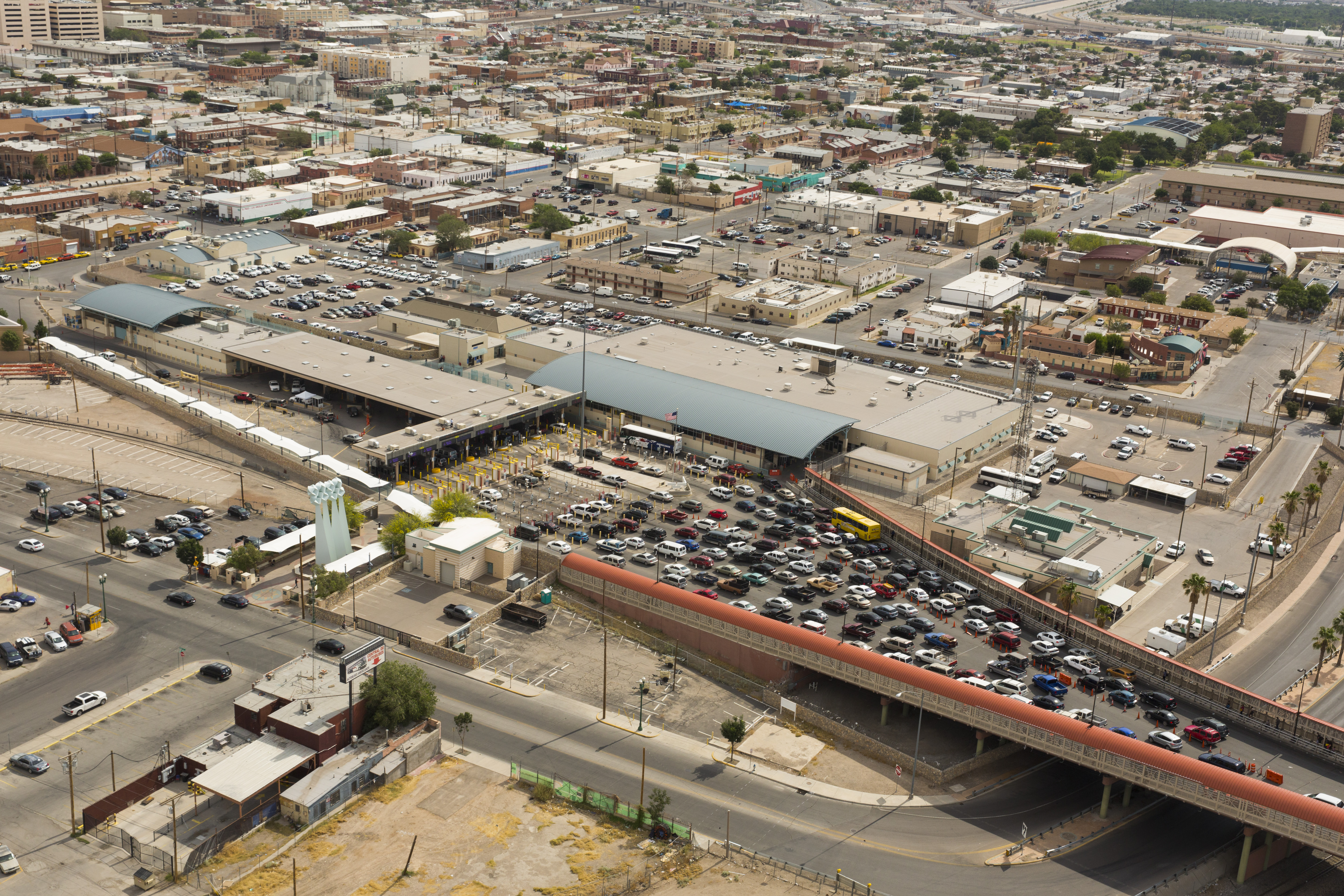
Border at Juarez

Release date: 11 November 2020

In Oaxaca, Charley and Ewan help with renovating the bus. With official paperwork and plates holding up its departure, they go ahead on the bikes towards Teotihuacan via the Tehuacán-Cuicatlán valley. At Teotihuacán they go up in a hot air balloon, giving them a bird’s eye view of the archaeological site.

Once the bus catches up with them they load the bikes for the journey north. With only 95-mile (153 km) to the US border remaining, they take to the open road and arrive in Juarez to find localised flooding. The team on the bus gets lost en route, but eventually everyone reaches the border crossing, to find they need to be at different gateways into the US some twenty miles apart due to the separation of commercial and non-commercial traffic. A refugee camp there illustrates the problems facing Mexico. After a twelve hour delay at the border, the team continues into Texas. Rapid charging stations in the US make the journey to California straightforward. In Palm Springs, reunited with their families, they form a convoy to ride into Los Angeles with the trip coming to an end at the Bike Shed Moto Co. in the L.A. Arts District.

ROUTE: Oaxaca (MEX) → Carretera Federal 135 / Carretera Federal 150 / Carretera Federal 132 → Teotihuacan (MEX) → ? → Chihuahua (MEX) → Carretera Federal 45 → Juarez (MEX) → Border crossing (El Paso del Norte) → El Paso (USA) → Interstate 110 / Interstate 10 → Willcox (USA) → Interstate 10 → Palm Springs (USA) → Interstate 10 / State Route 91 / Interstate 5 → Los Angeles (USA)

== Episodes ==
No.	Title	Original release date
1	"Preparation"	18 September 2020
2	"Ushuaia"	18 September 2020
3	"Southern Patagonia"	18 September 2020
4	"The Andes"	25 September 2020
5	"Atacama Desert Into Bolivia"	2 October 2020
6	"Bolivia"	9 October 2020
7	"Peru"	16 October 2020
8	"Ecuador"	23 October 2020
9	"Colombia, Panama & Costa Rica"	30 October 2020
10	"Nicaragua, Honduras, Guatemala & Mexico"	6 November 2020
11	"Oaxaca to L.A."	13 November 2020

== Music ==
The title song was performed by Welsh group Stereophonics, and is similar to the Long Way Round and Long Way Down theme with the lyrics "round" and "down" replaced with "up". Other artists to feature include: Jhony Rojas (two songs under Astronauta, two with Passto and four with Últimos Glaciares), Totó la Momposina, Aurelio, Sidestepper, Los de Abajo and Charlie Winston. During Episode 6 in Bolivia, McGregor performs an acoustic guitar cover of Endlessly by Muse, from their album Absolution.

== Critical reception ==
On the review aggregator website Rotten Tomatoes, the series holds an approval rating of 100% based on 6 reviews, with an average user rating of 8.50/10.

== Accolades ==
Year	Award	Category	Result	Ref.
2021	Daytime Creative Arts Emmy Awards	Outstanding Travel, Adventure and Nature Program	Nominated	
2021	Daytime Creative Arts Emmy Awards	Outstanding Multiple Camera Editing	Nominated	
2021	Daytime Creative Arts Emmy Awards	Outstanding Sound Mixing and Editing	Nominated	

== UNICEF ==
During Long Way Round, Ewan and Charley visited UNICEF programmes in Ukraine, Kazakhstan, and Mongolia. The last of which is where Ewan came across an orphaned girl who he would subsequently adopt and features in Long Way Up. After being made UK ambassadors, the pair embarked on their second adventure, Long Way Down, and saw UNICEF’s work with child soldiers in Uganda and land-mine awareness programmes in Ethiopia.

The Long Way Up sees the duo visit three more UNICEF programmes in Bolivia, Peru and Honduras. In Bolivia, Ewan and Charley visit the UNICEF supported Quechua indigenous Challamayu School and attend a bilingual lesson taught in Spanish and traditional Quechuan. The UNICEF program is designed to give indigenous Bolivian children the opportunity to learn and further their education in their own language.

In Peru the pair visit a Venezuelan refugee camp in Tumbes, close to the Ecuadorian border, where UNICEF is helping to identify and assist vulnerable or at-risk children, particularly those separated from family or unaccompanied by an adult. Here Charley and Ewan meet several children who are stuck in the camp desperately trying to reach family in other South American countries.

In Honduras, Charley and Ewan visit a UNICEF project at the Centro de Alcance Juvenil Japón in Choloma that gives children an alternative to gang membership and gang violence by providing a safe space, one that offers a range of programmes in drama and the arts.

== See also ==
- List of long-distance motorcycle riders
