= Ilya Espino de Marotta =

Engineer

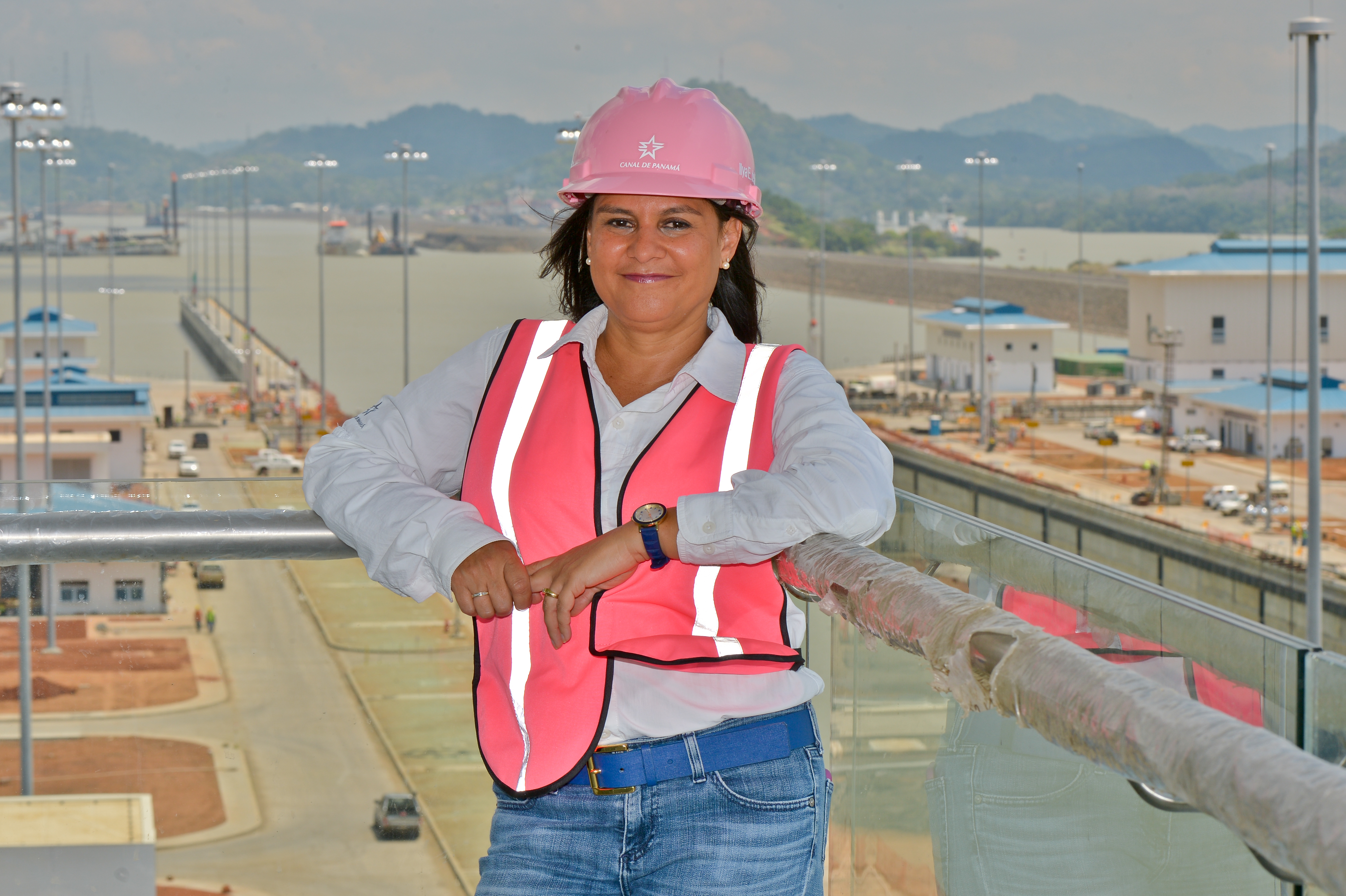
- Ilya Espino de Marotta in 2016
- Education: Texas A&M Galveston, Universidad Santa María La Antigua
- Spouse: Peter Marotta
- Children: Marco G. Marotta Espino, Peter A. Marotta Espino, Andrea N. Marotta Espino
- Engineering career
- Discipline: Marine engineering
- Employer: Panama Canal Authority
- Projects: Panama Canal Expansion

Ilya R. Espino de Marotta is an engineer best known for leading the Panama Canal Expansion Project as Executive Vice President for Engineering in the Panama Canal Authority. Espino de Marotta was appointed to the role in 2012 and was the first woman in the history of the Panama Canal Authority to hold the role. Espino de Marotta said that some male colleagues questioned her appointment and is quoted as saying, "I wear the pink hard-hat to make a statement that a woman can do this job." Marotta describes the Panama Canal Expansion project as "a dream job for any engineer". Alongside responsibility for the physical expansion of the canal Marotta also oversaw other investment projects including, all the construction contracts, new bridges and purchasing. Every month during the expansion phase of the project, she directed a videography team from a helicopter to monitor work on the canal.

== Education ==
Espino de Marotta earned a degree in Marine Engineering from Texas A&M in 1985. She earned a master's degree in Economic Engineering from the Universidad Santa María La Antigua (The Old Saint Mary University in Panama City, Republic of Panama) in 1996. Espino de Marotta also studied management at the Instituto Centroamericano de Administración de Empresas (INCAE).

The Project Management Institute certified her as "Project Manager" in 2007. She is also certified as a licensed public translator.

== Career ==
Espino de Marotta says that her fascination with the water was due in part to her fascination with scuba diving and the work of Jacques Cousteau who was an explorer of the ocean and also pioneered the aqualung. Marotta has worked for the Panama Canal Authority since 1985, where her first role was in the repair workshop on the canal in Colón. She began working as a valuation engineer for the Canal Accounting Division in 1994. In 1998, she became the capital investment program coordinator for the Department of Maritime Operations. Since 2002 she has been involved in the expansion project and in 2007 became executive manager of resources and project control. In 2012, Jorge Luis Quijano suggested that Espino de Marotta replace him as the executive vice president on the Panama Canal Expansion Project.

Espino de Marotta was awarded "Outstanding Woman of the Year" in 2014 by the Panamanian Association of Business Executives. Forbes Magazine included her in its list of the 50 most powerful women in Central America. She was also featured on the cover.

In 2025 she was elected an international fellow of the Royal Academy of Engineering
