= Barrancas, Neuquén =

Barrancas
- Municipality and village
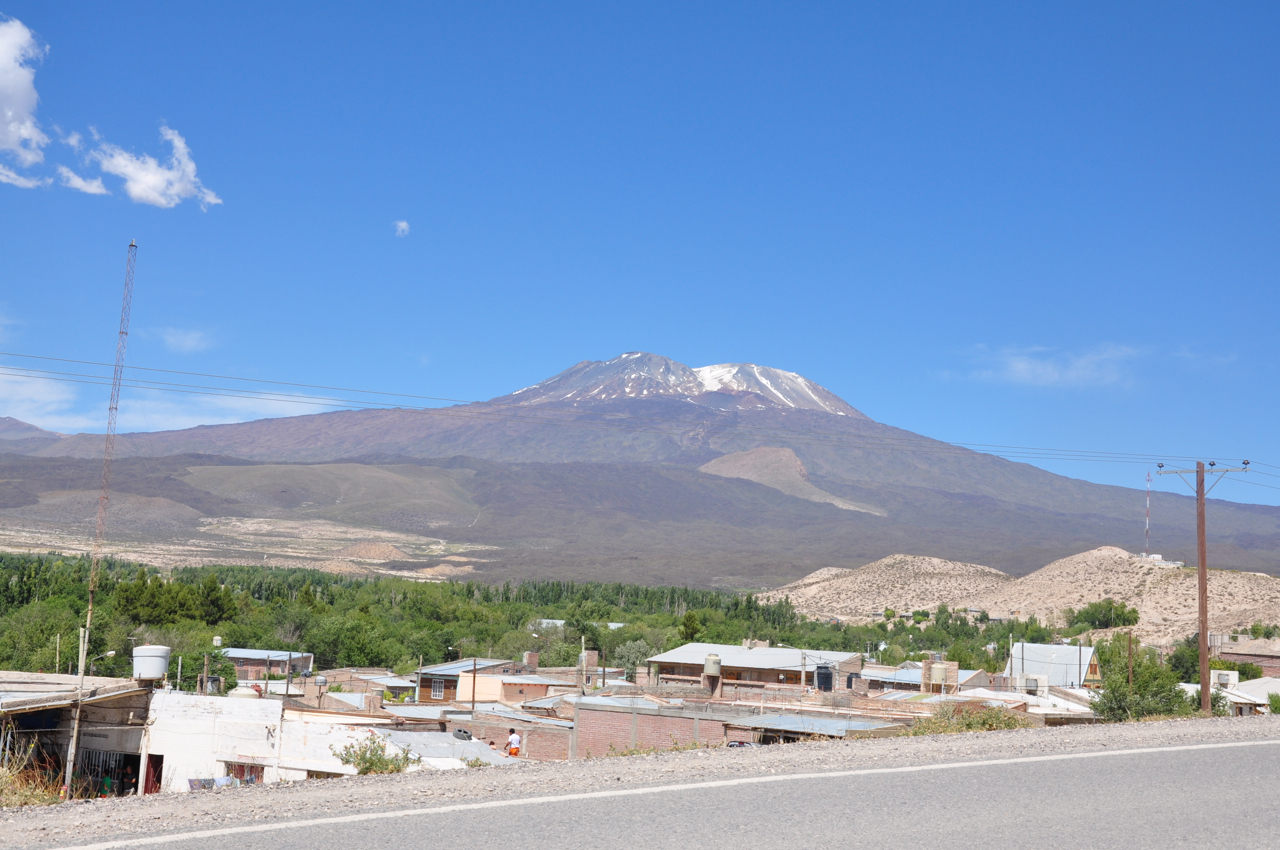

- Location within Neuquén Province Location within Argentina
- Coordinates: 36°49′15″S 69°54′52″W
- Country: Argentina
- Province: Neuquén Province
- Department: Pehuenches Department

Government
  - Mayor: Juvenal Urrutia MPN

Population (2001)
  - Total: 813
- Time zone: UTC−3 (ART)
- Postcode: Q8353
- Area code: 02948
- Climate: BSk

Barrancas (Neuquén) is a village and municipality in Neuquén Province in southwestern Argentina.

== Population ==
Barrancas has a population of 813 as of 2001, which shows an 80.2% increase over the previous census in 1991 when the population was 451.
