= Harpocrates =

God-child of Greek and Egyptian mythology

Name in hieroglyphs
G5 Z1 p X r d Xrd
- Major cult center: Alexandria and Mendes
- Parents: Isis and Osiris, Serapis or Banebdjedet and Hatmehit (at Mendes)

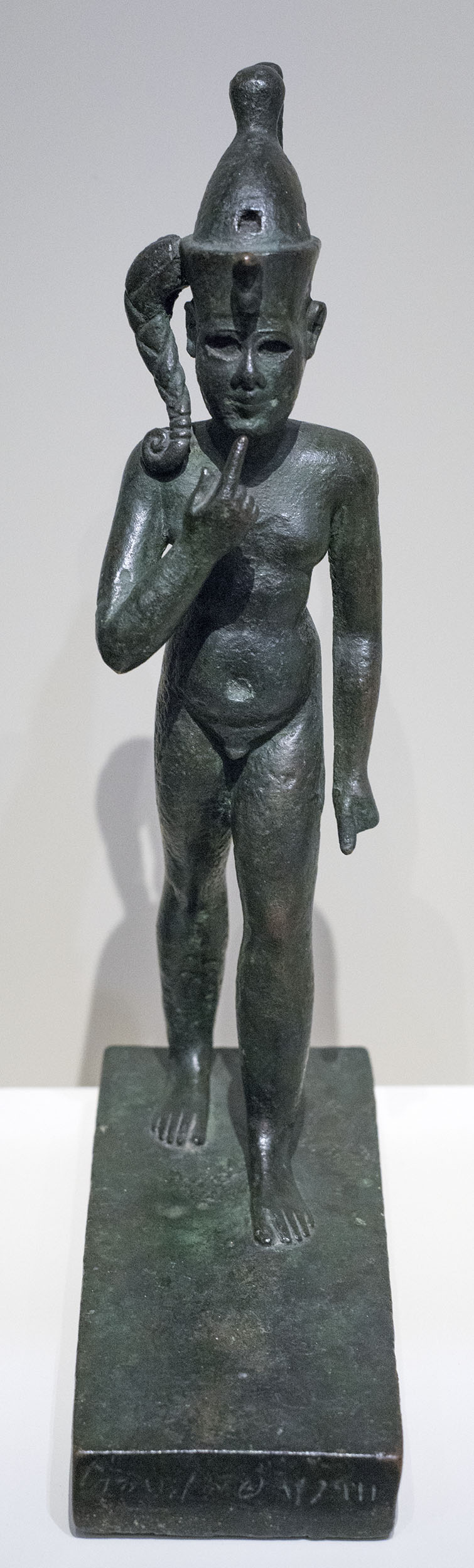
One of two known Phoenician Harpocrates statues

Harpocrates (Ancient Greek: Ἁρποκράτης, Phoenician: 𐤇𐤓𐤐𐤊𐤓𐤈, romanized: ḥrpkrṭ, Coptic: ϩⲁⲣⲡⲟⲕⲣⲁⲧⲏⲥ harpokratēs) is the god of silence, secrets, and confidentiality, and a protector of reputations in the Hellenistic religion developed in Ptolemaic Alexandria (and also an embodiment of hope, according to Plutarch). Greeks adapted Harpocrates from the Egyptian child-god Horus, who represented the newborn sun, rising each day at dawn. The name "Harpocrates" originated as a Hellenization of the Egyptian Har-pa-khered or Heru-pa-khered, meaning "Horus the Child".

Horus the Child was portrayed as a naked boy with his finger to his mouth as if sucking on it, an Egyptian artistic convention for representing a child. Greeks and Romans misunderstood this pose as a gesture of silence and interpreted Harpocrates as the god of secrecy.

== Horus ==
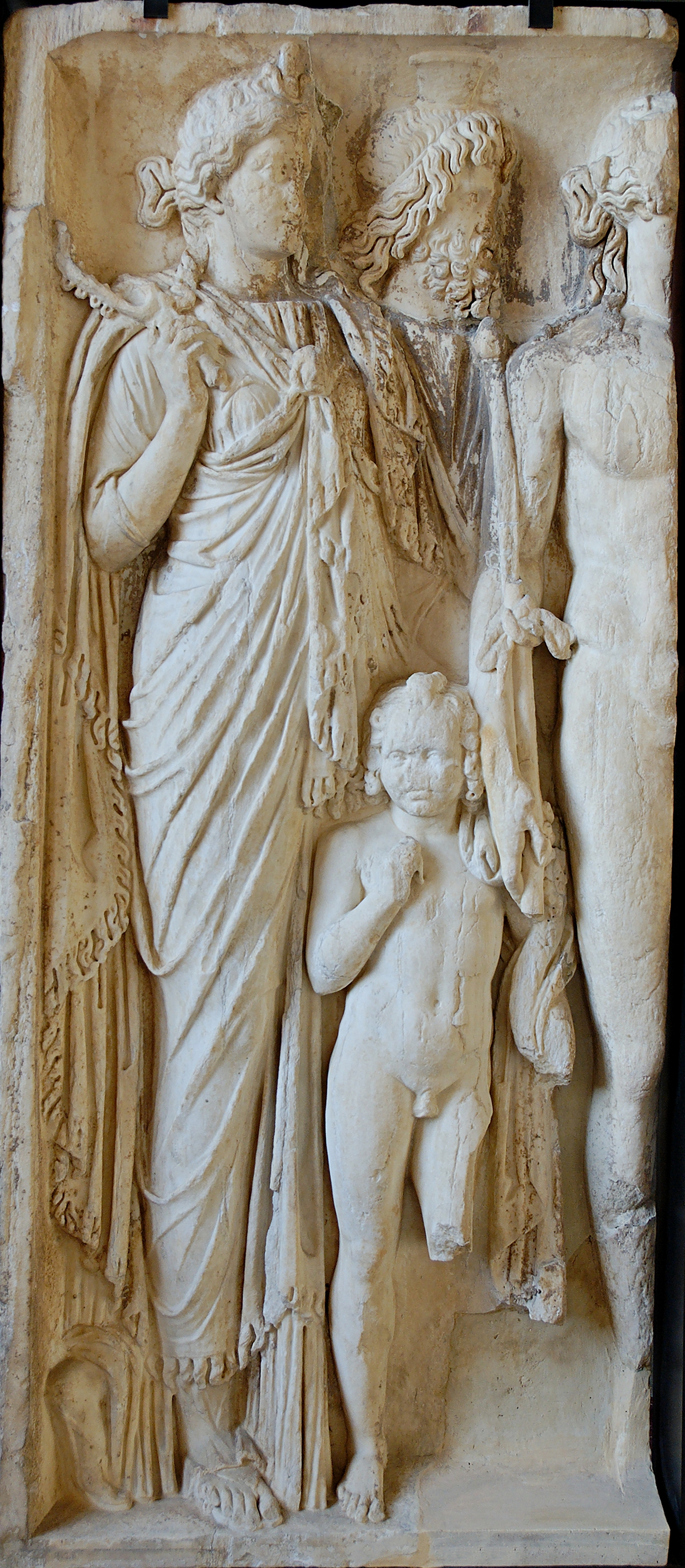
Isis, Serapis and their child Harpocrates (Louvre)

In Egyptian mythology, Horus was the child of Isis and Osiris. Osiris was the original divine pharaoh of Egypt, who had been murdered by his brother Set (by interpretatio graeca, identified with Typhon or Chaos), mummified, and thus became the god of the underworld. The Greeks melded Osiris with their underworldly Hades to produce the essentially Alexandrian syncretism known as Serapis.

Among the Egyptians, the full-grown Horus was considered the victorious god of the sun who each day overcomes darkness. He is often represented with the head of a Eurasian sparrowhawk, which was sacred to him, as the hawk flies high above the Earth. Horus fought battles against Set, until he finally achieved victory and became the ruler of Egypt. Thereafter, the pharaohs of Egypt were seen as reincarnations of the victorious Horus.

"Horus on the Crocodiles" steles depicting Heru-pa-Khered standing on the back of a crocodile and holding snakes in his outstretched hands were erected in Egyptian temple courtyards, where they would be immersed or lustrated (purified) in water; the water was then used for blessing and healing purposes as the name of Heru-pa-Khered was itself attributed with many protective and healing powers.

In the Alexandrian and Roman renewed vogue for the Greco-Roman mysteries at the turn of the millennium into the common era — mystery cults had already existed for centuries — the worship of Horus became widely extended, linked with his mother Isis and his father Serapis.

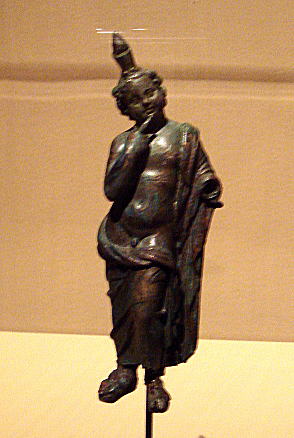
Bronze statuette of Harpocrates, Bagram, Afghanistan, 2nd century.

In this way Harpocrates, the child Horus, personifies the newborn sun each day, the first strength of the winter sun, and also the image of early vegetation. Egyptian statues represent the child Horus, pictured as a naked boy with his finger on his chin with the fingertip just below the lips of his mouth, a realization of the hieroglyph for "child" that is unrelated to the Greco-Roman and modern gesture for "silence". Misunderstanding this sign, the later Greeks and Roman poets made Harpocrates the god of silence and secrecy, taking their cue from Marcus Terentius Varro, who asserted in De lingua Latina of Caelum (Sky) and Terra (Earth).

These gods are the same as those who in Egypt are called Serapis and Isis, though Harpocrates with his finger makes a sign to me to be quiet. The same first gods were in Latium called Saturn and Ops.

Ovid described Isis:

Upon her [Isis's] brow stood the crescent moon-horns, garlanded with glittering heads of golden grain, and grace of royal dignity; and at her side the baying dog Anubis, dappled Apis, sacred Bubastis and the god who holds his finger to his lips for silence sake.

One other tale relates the story about the Greek gods. Aphrodite gave a rose to her son Eros, the god of love; he, in turn, gave it to Harpocrates to ensure that his mother's indiscretions (or those of the gods in general, in other accounts) were kept under wraps. This gave roses the connotation of secrecy (a rose suspended from the ceiling of a council chamber pledged all present – sub rosa "under the rose"), which continued through the Middle Ages and through the modern era.

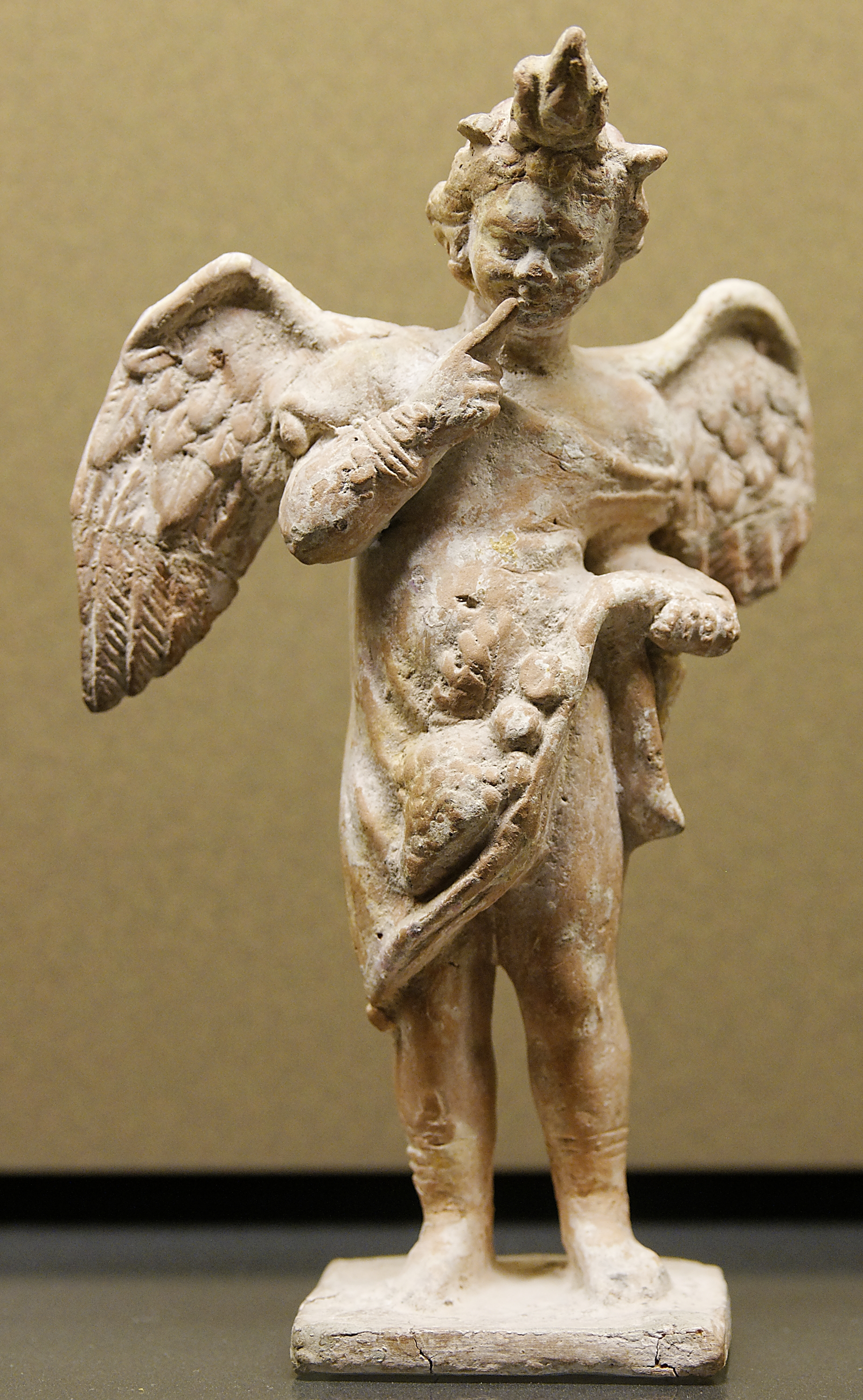
Harpocratic Eros, terracotta figurine made in Myrina, Greece, c. 100–50 B.C. (Louvre)

Inexpensive cast terracotta images of Harpocrates, suitable for house shrines, are found scattered throughout the Roman Empire. Thus Augustine of Hippo was aware of the iconic gesture of Harpocrates:

And since in practically all the temples where Serapis and Isis were worshiped there was also a figure that seemed to enjoin silence by a finger pressed against its lips, Varro thinks this had the same meaning, that no mention should be made of their having been human beings.

Martianus Capella, author of an allegorizing textbook that remained a standard through the Middle Ages recognized the image of the "boy with his finger pressed to his lips" but neglected to mention Harpocrates's name: "[Q]uidam redimitus puer ad os compresso digito salutari silentium commonebat". The boy was identified, however, as Cupid in glosses, a syncretism that had already resulted in the figure of Harpocratic Cupid.

Plutarch wrote that Harpocrates was the second son of Isis and that he was born prematurely with lame legs. Horus the Child became the special protector of children and their mothers. As he was healed of a poisonous snake bite by Ra he became a symbol of hope in the gods looking after suffering humanity.

Another solar cult, not directly connected with Harpocrates, was that of Sol Invictus "the Unconquered Sun".

Amulet depicting the god Harpocrates. Egyptian faience, between 722 and 332 BC, Late Period of ancient Egypt. Museo Egizio, Turin.

Bronze statuette of Harpocrates. Late Period, between 722 and 332 BC. Museo Egizio. Turin.

== Modern occultist uses ==
Modern occultists display his image, loosely connected now with Hermetic gnosticism.

Many Discordians consider Harpo Marx to have been a contemporary avatar of Harpocrates. Because of this, Discordians often invoke Harpocrates as a trickster god or god of humor in addition to his classical attribution of god of silence.

== Cultural uses ==
Roses, a symbol strongly associated with Harpocrates, can sometimes be seen painted or else plastered upon borders around the ceilings of rooms intended for the receiving of guests (dining rooms, parlours, etc.), as a sign that topics discussed within the room are not to be discussed or else repeated outside of the room and other outside parties. Similarly, roses may be placed over confessionals to symbolize confidentiality.

== Archaeology ==
In 2018, archaeologists discovered a bone figurine depicting the god dating back to the 1st century BC. In addition to the god, two satyrs and a goose are depicted. It was discovered during excavations at the ancient Greek city of Tiritaka at Crimea. A statue of Harpocrates was also found in Saudi Arabia at Qaryat al-Faw, the capital of the Kingdom of Kinda in late antiquity.

== See also ==
- Elpis, Greek goddess of Hope.
- Fides, Roman goddess of trust and confidentiality.
