= Kanichi Fujiwara =

Long-distance motorcycle rider and writer

- 藤原かんいち or 藤原 寛一
- Born: 1961 (age 64–65); Iwate Prefecture, Japan
- Known for: Long-distance motorcycle riding
- Spouse: Hiroko Fujiwara
- Website: kanichi.com

Kanichi Fujiwara is a Japanese long-distance motorcycle rider and writer.

== Journeys ==
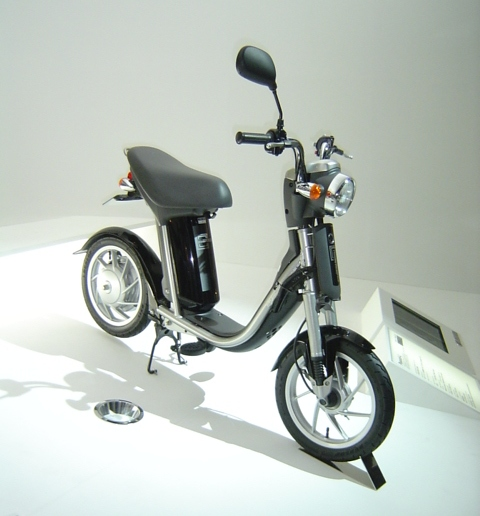
Yamaha Passol model used in 2004–2008 circumnavigation

Between May 1987 and August 1999 he journeyed several continents with a number of small motorcycles including a Honda Super Cub, 50 cc Honda Motra and Honda Gorilla utility minibikes, and a Honda Dio scooter. His 1995 trip around Japan was documented in his 1997 book The Original Bike Bastard Starving Around Japan.

Between March 2004 and May 2008 he made a 50,552-kilometre (31,412 mi) journey circumnavigating the world on a Yamaha Passol electric scooter, on a route including Australia from Sydney to Perth, Thailand, India to Lisbon, South Africa to Kenya, and America from New York to San Francisco (44 countries). It may have been the first global circumnavigation by electric two-wheeler. Fujiwara visited and documented the sites of sacred trees in various countries to spread awareness of green transportation.

The scooter he used in the 2004–2008 circumnavigation, sponsored by Yamaha, weighed 45 kilograms (99 lb), had a 30 km/h top speed, and an endurance of 20 km on a battery charge. Even with six batteries giving a 100 km range, his partner had to shuttle charged batteries to him in order to cross Australia's Nullarbor Plain.

Between April 2009 and November 2013, he rode 100,000 kilometers across Japan's major highways on a 50 cc Honda Cub, sponsored by motorcycle apparel supplier Rough & Road, and supported by serializing his journeys in the Japanese magazine Tandem Style and on his own blog.

== Online journalism ==
In addition to various blogs covering his motorcycle travels, Fujiwara is also a food critic. His "Tabigohan" column covers road food at roadside stations and other Japanese venues for BBB-Bike, an online publication of large Japanese auction house BDS.

== Bibliography ==
- Fujiwara, Kanichi (1997), 原チャリ野郎のハラペコ日本一周―74日間1万3390km8万5909円の旅 [The original bike bastard starving around Japan: 74 day, 13,390 km journey on 85,909 Yen], Japan Travel Bureau Publishing, ISBN 978-4533028144

== Notes and references ==
=== References ===
- Fujiwara, Kanichi (2003), Route map and mileage, archived from the original on 2016-03-03
- Japanese Man to Travel 'Around-the-Globe' on Electric Scooter, Agence France-Presse, March 9, 2004
- Fujiwara, Kanichi (2004), Big trees (published 2004–2008)
- "World trip on no-emission electric scooter", Channel News Asia, March 2, 2004 – via Reed Business Information
- "環境に配慮、電動バイクで世界一周へ 藤原夫妻" [Environmentally friendly: Fujiwara and his wife to travel around the world on electric bike], Asahi Shimbun (in Japanese), March 23, 2004, archived from the original on June 10, 2015 – via China People's Daily
- Hedge, Trevor (November 29, 2004), Battery powered world adventurers visit Perth, mcnews.com.au, archived from the original on August 31, 2011
- Fujiwara, Kanichi (June 17, 2008), 素晴らしい旅をありがとう [Thank you for a wonderful journey] (in Japanese), BBB-Bike.com, archived from the original on 2013-07-25
- Fujiwara, Kanichi (May 2009), 僕のワールドツーリングを支えてくれた原チャリ列伝 ／ 藤原かんいち [Original bikes that have supported my world touring]
- "ラフ&ロードな人々 — フリーライター 藤原かんいち＆ヒロコ 夫婦" [People — Couple: freelance writer Kanichi & Hiroko Fujiwara], Rough & Road official blog (in Japanese), Rough & Road, March 30, 2009
- "100,000 キロの旅ストーリー!" [The story of a journey of 100,000 kilometers], Tandem Style (in Japanese): 66–67, May 2009 – via Rough & Road official blog
- "タンデムスタイル５月号（3/24発売）掲載記事" [An article in the May issue of Tandem Style], Rough & Road official blog (in Japanese), Rough & Road, April 13, 2009
- Two-wheel related auctions (in Japanese), BDS, 2011
- Services (in Japanese), BDS, 2011
- Fujiwara, Kanichi (2012), 藤原かんいち 全国旅ごはん！バイク紀行 [Kanichi Fujiwara's cross-country road food! Bike journey], BBB-Bike (in Japanese), BDS Company Inc. (published 2012–2013)
- "100,000 km on the road", Tandem Style (in Japanese) (122): 90–95, July 2012 – via Rough & Road official blog
- Tesch, Bernd (September 11, 2013), Around-The-World by motorcycle, 2001–2004
- Fujiwara, Kanichi (November 7, 2013), "本日100000キロ達成しました!!" [Achieved 100,000 km today!!], On the Road 100000km blog
