= Yamaha Passol =

Electric scooter produced 2002–2007

Yamaha Passol/Passol-L
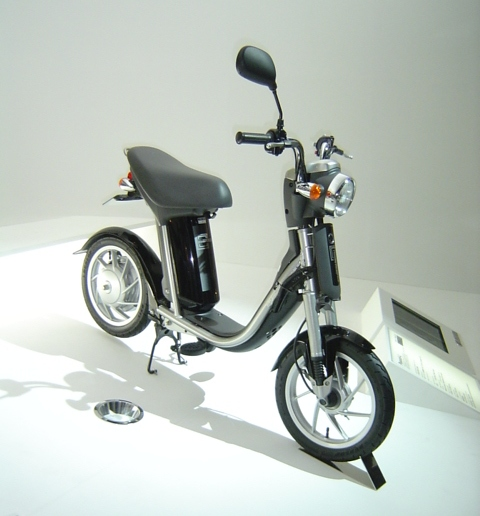
- Passol-L at its 2005 Tokyo Motor Show introduction
- Manufacturer: Yamaha Motor Company
- Also called: Yamaha EC 02; Yamaha EC 03
- Production: 2002–2007
- Class: Electric scooter
- Engine: Brushless DC electric wheel hub motor
- Power: 0.58 kW (0.78 hp)
- Frame type: Aluminum pipe backbone
- Suspension: Telescopic fork
- Brakes: Drum front and rear
- Tires: 60/100-12
- Wheelbase: 1,040 mm
- Dimensions: L: 1,530 mm W: 600 mm H: 995 mm
- Seat height: 745 mm
- Weight: 44 kg (97 lb) (dry)
- Fuel capacity: 14 Ah battery (Passol)
- Turning radius: 1.6 m
- Related: Yamaha EC-02

The Yamaha Passol is a line of scooters manufactured by Yamaha Motor Company beginning in 1977.

== Passol S50(1977) ==
The Yamaha Passol S50 is a scooter produced by Yamaha Motor Company. The scooter was Yamaha's first production scooter and was only released to the Japanese market.

The original Passol was launched in March 1977. To compete with Honda's Road Pal, which had Sophia Loren to promote it, Yamaha brought in actress Kaoru Yachigusa to promote the bike through commercials. Alongside the commercials, Yamaha also held exhibits and moped license schools to allow more people to have the ability to ride the scooter.

The Passol was originally marketed as a commuter bike and was listed at a price of ¥69,800 (~$250 following the exchange rate at the time). The bike was specifically marketed towards women in Japan and created the "soft bike" market. At the time Japan was beginning to incorporate women into the workforce. Yamaha decided to capitalize on this potential market by offering motorcycles designed for daily mobility.

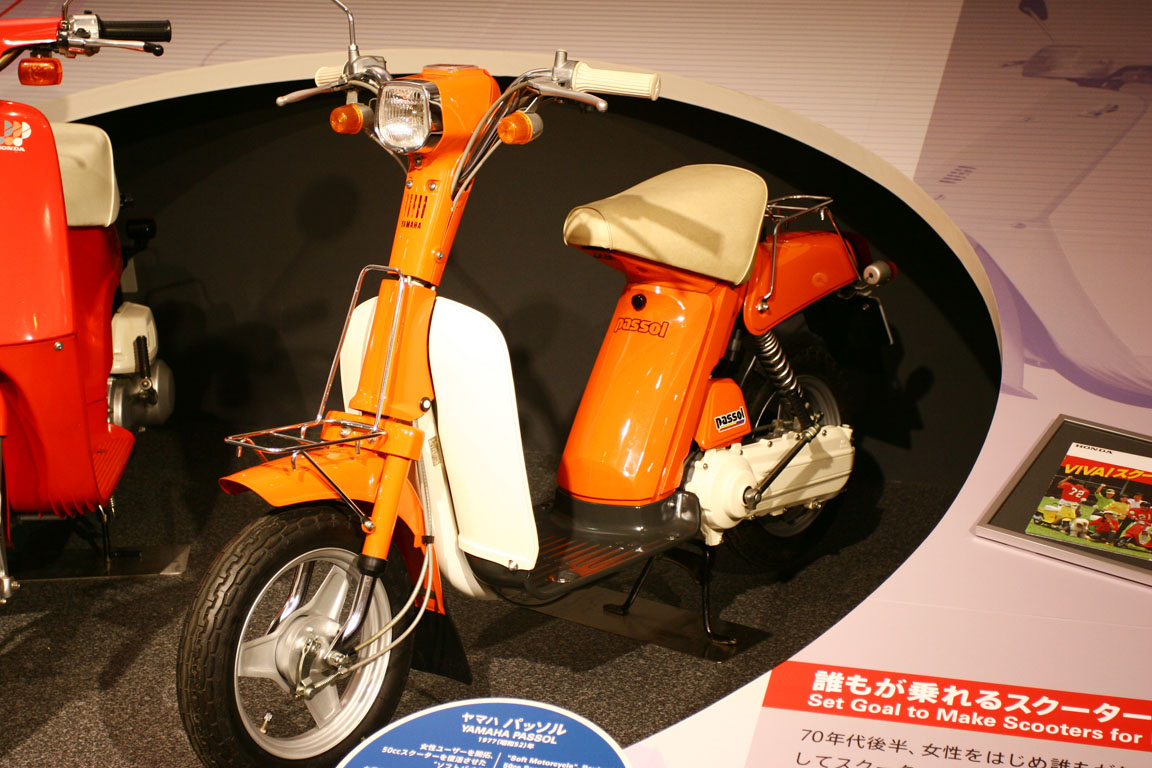
YAMAHA PASSOL S50 1977

=== Features ===
The frame of the Passol, also known as the 2E9 frame, was designed in a way to allow almost anyone to ride the scooter. Incorporated in the design of the bike were engine covers that were designed to avoid the fear of getting one's clothing dirty and also to give it a clean image. Yamaha also designed the "step-through" design in contrast to the "leg-over mounting" design to make the bike more comfortable and easier to get on.

Yamaha used drum brakes for both the front and rear brakes on the Passol. The bike also had bicycle handbrakes to give the comfort of riding a bicycle.

The Passol was given a 49cc Vertical engine. The engine was air-cooled and also included a carburetor. The engine was a single-cylinder, two stroke engine. The engine cylinder had a bore of 40mm and a stroke of 39.7mm. The engine produced 2.3ps (2.27 hp) at around 5,500 rpm and 3.6Nm (0.37kgfm) at around 3,500 rpm.

Yamaha gave the Passol a telescopic fork suspension for the front of the bike and a single shock suspension in the rear.

=== Specifications ===
- Engine: Vertical air-cooled two-stroke engine
- Total displacement: 49cc
- Maximum output: 2.3 horsepower/5,500 rpm
- Torque: 3.6 Nm
- Bore x stroke: 40mm x 39.7mm
- Top speed: 45 km/h
- Vehicle weight: 45 kg
- Frame type: 2E9
- Transmission: Continuously variable transmission
- Clutch: Automatic centrifugal clutch
- Brakes: Front and rear mechanical drum brakes
- Suspension: Front Telescopic and rear Unit Swing
- Fuel Capacity: 2.3L
- Fuel Consumption: 75 km/L

== Passola SA50 (1978) ==
After the success of the Passol the year prior, Yamaha updated the scooter the next year with the Passola. The Passola was marketed as the higher-end version of the original Passol. The Passola was released to the Japanese market at the price of ¥89,800. In addition to adding an extra 0.5 hp, the Passola also added a fuel gauge, automatic choke, and oil-level warning lamp.

=== Specifications ===
- Engine: Vertical air-cooled two-stroke engine
- Total displacement: 49cc
- Maximum output: 2.8 horsepower/6,000 rpm
- Torque: 3.8 Nm
- Bore x stroke: 40mm x 39.7mm
- Top speed: 45 km/h
- Vehicle weight: 51 kg
- Frame type: 2E9
- Transmission: 2-speed automatic transmission
- Clutch: Automatic centrifugal clutch
- Brakes: Front and rear mechanical drum brakes
- Suspension: Front Telescopic and rear Unit Swing
- Fuel Capacity: 2.3L
- Fuel Consumption: 75 km/L

== Electric Scooter (2002) ==
The electric scooter manufactured by Yamaha Motor Company began production in 2002, and sold only in Japan. Weight is 44 kilograms (97 lb) and claimed range 32 kilometres (20 mi). It was described as the first mass-produced electric motorcycle in Japan (the Peugeot Scoot'Elec was produced earlier). It has a lithium-ion battery. A Passol-L model with the same motor and bigger battery was released in 2005, and a related electric, the EC-02, featuring a built-in iPod dock, also was released in 2005.

A recall for battery problems in the Passol and EC-02 was issued in late 2006, followed by the halting of production of all Yamaha electric motorcycles in 2007 due to the recall coupled with weak sales.

== Records and awards ==
In 2003, the Passol won the Good Design Gold Award (MITI Prize) from Japan's Ministry of International Trade and Industry.

In 2004, Japanese long-distance motorcyclist Kanichi Fujiwara set off to circumnavigate the world on a Passol. It may have been the first global circumnavigation by electric two-wheeler.

In 2004, Yamaha won the Hong Kong Design Centre's Design for Asia Award for Product Design for the Passol.

== In exhibitions ==
A Passol was exhibited in an international show on Japanese design at Metropolitan State College of Denver's Center for Visual Art in 2005.

== Specifications ==
Specifications in infobox from Ono n.d.:6.

== Notes and references ==
=== References ===
- Yamaha unveils its first no-emission electric scooter, Agence France-Presse (AFP), October 9, 2002 – via Space Daily
- 2003 Good Design Gold Award: Electric Commuter Yamaha Passol EA06/5UY2, Ministry of International Trade and Industry, 2003
- DFA Award 2004: PASSOL electric scooter (PDF), Hong Kong Design Centre, archived from the original on June 10, 2015
- Hedge, Trevor (November 29, 2004), Battery powered world adventurers visit Perth, mcnews.com.au, archived from the original on August 31, 2011
- MacMillan, Kyle (Jul 4, 2005), "A Japanese design exhibition at Metro State is a little bit art, a little bit pop culture and a lot of kitschy fun", Denver Post, p. F.01
- Hanlon, Mike (October 27, 2005), Yamaha's radical adjustable electric motorcycle, Gizmag
- Photos: These bikes hum and fold: Yamaha Passol-L, CNET News, November 9, 2005
- "EC-02、Passol-Lに関するリコール情報", Recall bulletin (in Japanese), Yamaha Motor Company, 2006-10-05
- Moodie, Alison (June 25, 2007), "Green Wheels", Newsweek, archived from the original on September 24, 2015 – via HighBeam Research
- Yamaha EC-02, A Glowing-In-The-Dark IPod Scooter, Topspeed.com, August 22, 2007
- Yamaha unveils zero-emission electric motor scooter, AFP, July 14, 2010, archived from the original on July 19, 2010 – via Google News
- Kume, Hideyoshi (July 15, 2010), "Yamaha Motor to Reenter Electric Two-wheeled Vehicle Market", Tech-On!, Nikkei Business Publications
- Ono, Tomohiro (n.d.), "Specifications", Yamaha electric scooter 'Passol' (Yamaha technical paper)
- Tesch, Bernd (September 11, 2013), Around-The-World by motorcycle, 2001–2004
