= Abenteuermuseum (Saarbrücken) =

Coordinates: 49°14′42.119″N 6°59′20.350″E

Abenteuermuseum (Saarbrücken) is a former museum in Saarland, Germany, which was founded by the deceased Heinz Rox-Schulz.

== Exhibition ==
The Saarbrücker Abenteuermuseum, founded by the globetrotter, artist, author, and filmmaker Heinz Rox-Schulz, was an institution of the capital of Saarland. In the course of his trips to Africa, Asia, South America, and New Guinea, he brought curiosities and cultural objects like shrunk heads from Jivaro-Indians, hand axes, swords, rhino heads, sculptures, and Tibetan skull cups. The ethnological treasures include such as a corn mummy and a life-size figure in full gear of a warrior of the Tuareq from the Sahara. On his travels, Heinz Rox-Schulz battled his way as an artist and gymnast. Later, he became a cameraman at Saarländischer Rundfunk. His adventures and experiences can be found in his books "Die Abenteuer des Mr. Rox: Ohne Geld in die Welt" or "Himmel und Hölle Indien". He died a few days after his eighty-third birthday in March 2004. Until the end he guided school classes through his museum to promote respect for other cultures.

== Closure and reopening ==
In October 2004 the museum within the "Alten Rathaus am Schlossplatz" has been closed because the city canceled the grants for the personnel costs. Its stocks has been stored in boxes in rooms of the city of Saarbrücken since September 2005. On 10 February 2009, the city council or Saarbrücken refused the proposal to host the museum in two rooms in the former Saarbrücker Deutschherrnschule. The city council decided to locate an ethnological collection, which should take the remaining stocks of the "Abenteuermuseum".

Since November 2013, pieces of the collection can be found in the Krimicafe "Baker Street", which is located at the Mainzer Straße in Saarbrücken. In addition to the permanent exhibition the booster club "Freunde des Abenteuermuseums" wants to keep up the memories of Rox-Schulz by arranging regular special exhibitions.
