= Banebdjedet =

Ancient Egyptian deity

- Banebdjedet as a man with four ram heads wielding a Was-sceptre and Ankh
Name in hieroglyphs
E10 nb Dd Dd t niwt
- Major cult center: Mendes
- Consort: Hatmehit
- Offspring: Horus the Child, Khereduankh

Equivalents
- Upper Egyptian: Khnum

Banebdjedet also spelled Banebdjed or Banebdjetet is an Ancient Egyptian ram god with a cult centre at Mendes. Khnum was the equivalent god in Upper Egypt. He is most notable for appearing in the myth of Horus and Set.

== Family ==
His wife was the goddess Hatmehit ("Foremost of the Fishes"), who was perhaps the original deity of Mendes. Their offspring was "Horus the Child" and they formed the so-called "Mendesian Triad".

== Etymology ==
The words for "ram" and "soul" sounded the same in Egyptian, so ram deities were at times regarded as appearances of other gods.

== Image ==
Typically, the horned god Banebdjedet was depicted with four rams' heads to represent the four Bas of the sun god. He may also be linked to the first four gods to rule over Egypt (Osiris, Geb, Shu and Ra-Atum), with large granite shrines to each in the Mendes sanctuary.

== Accounts ==
The Book of the Heavenly Cow describes the "Ram of Mendes" as being the Ba of Osiris, but this was not an exclusive association. A story dated to the New Kingdom describes him as being consulted by the "Divine Tribunal" to judge between Horus and Seth, but he proposes that Neith do it instead as an act of diplomacy. As the dispute continues, it is Banebdjedet who suggests that Seth be given the throne as he is the elder brother.

Inside a chapel in the Ramesseum, a stela records how the god Ptah took the form of Banebdjedet, in view of gaining his virility, in order to have union with the woman who would conceive Rameses II.

== Gallery ==
Banebdjedet as a four-headed ram

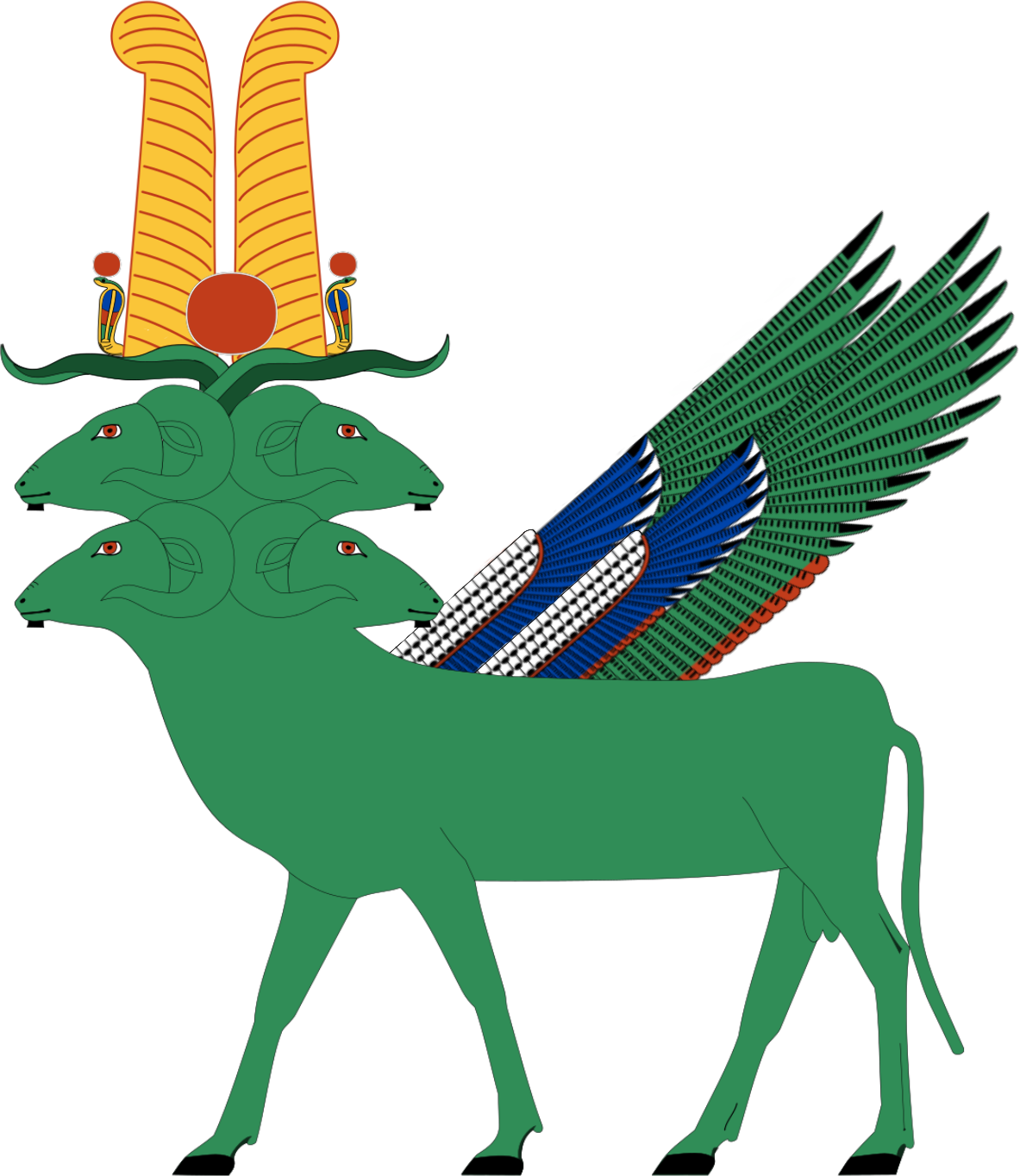
Banebdjedet as a four-headed ram with wings and a dual-feathers crown

Banebdjedet as a mummified man with the head of a ram

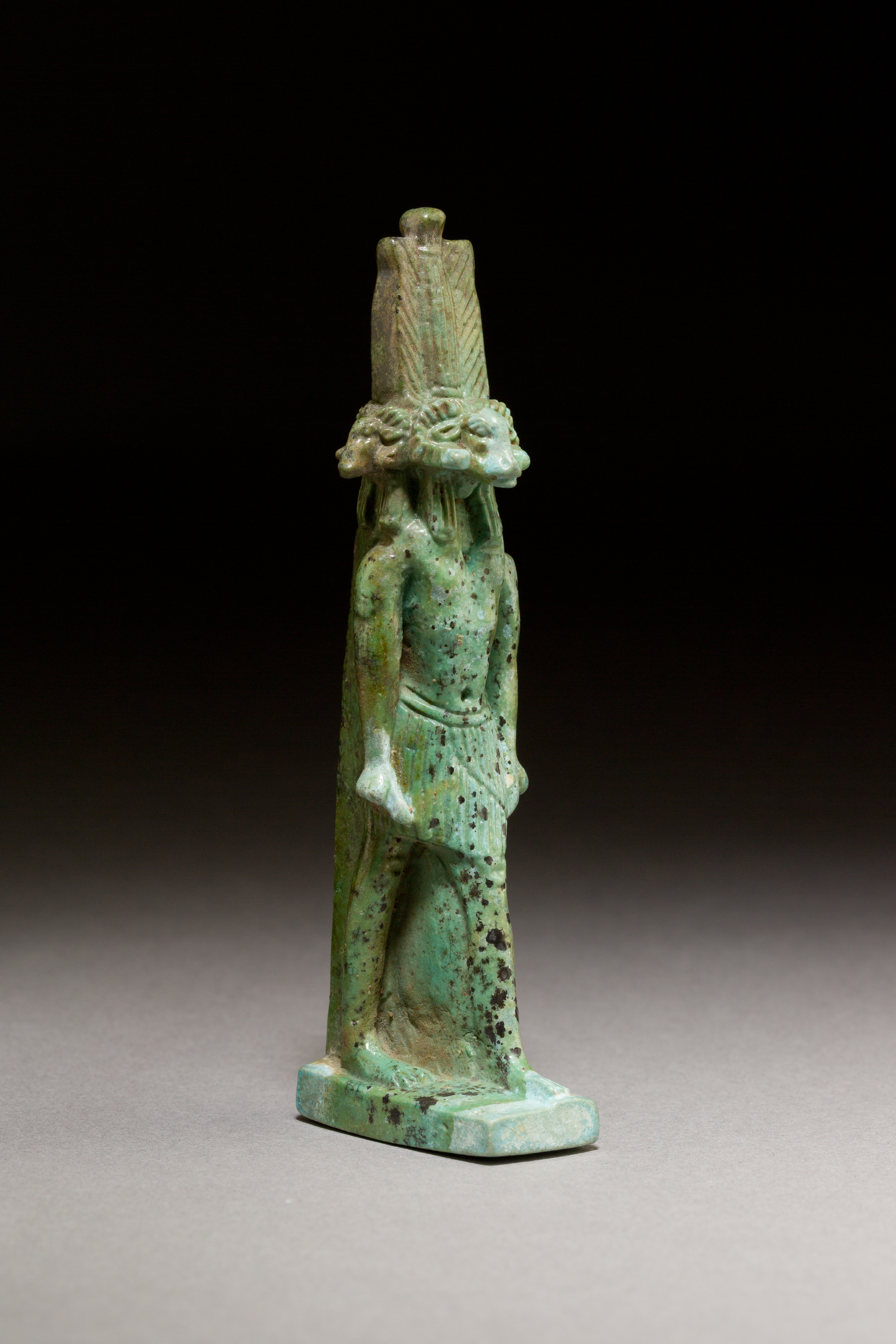
A statuette likely depicting Banebdjedet with four ram heads facing in four directions. Faience ceramic, ca 500-200 BC. Metropolitan Museum of Art

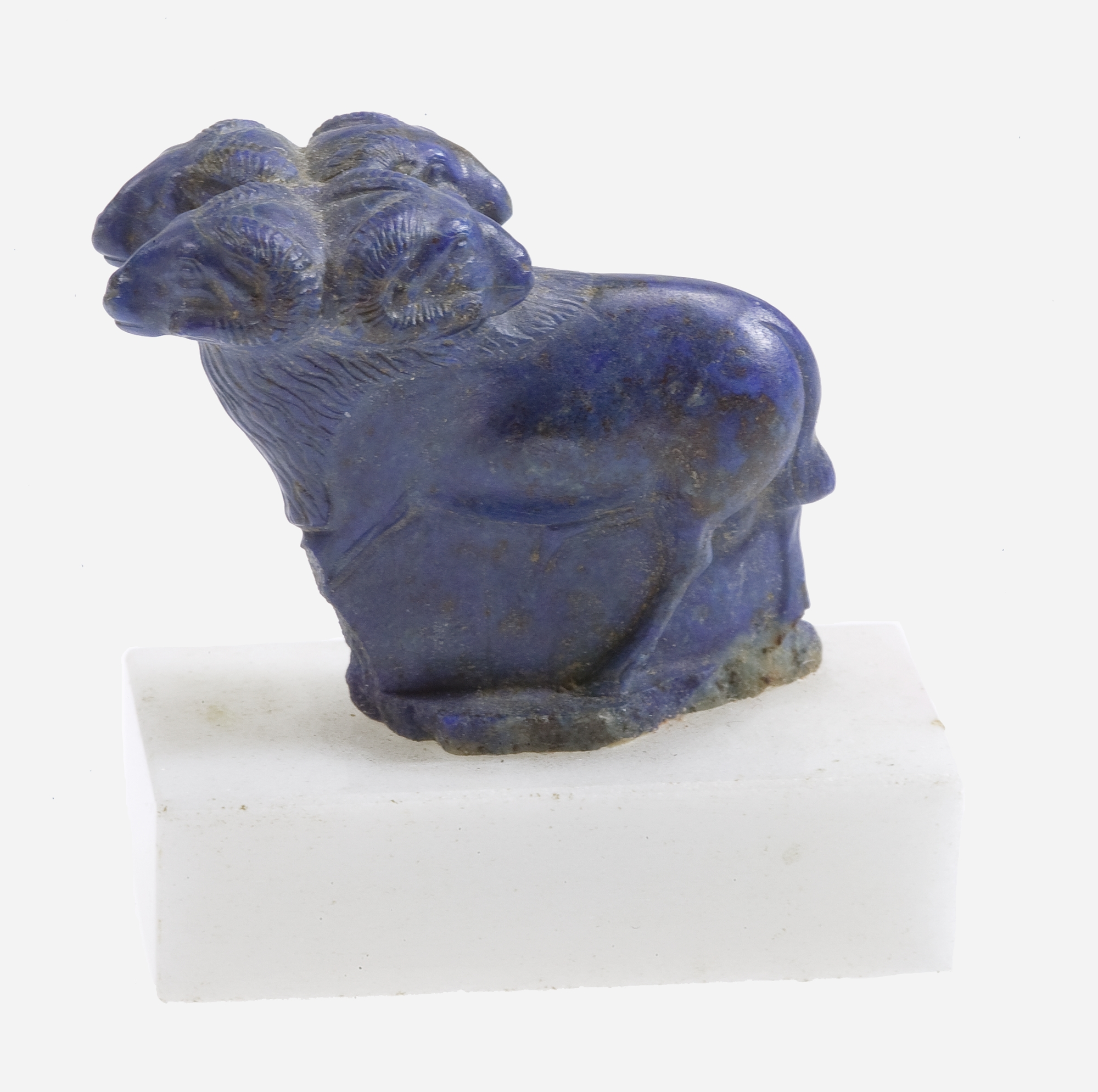
An amulet depicting Banebdjedet as a ram with four heads, Late Period. Metropolitan Museum of Art

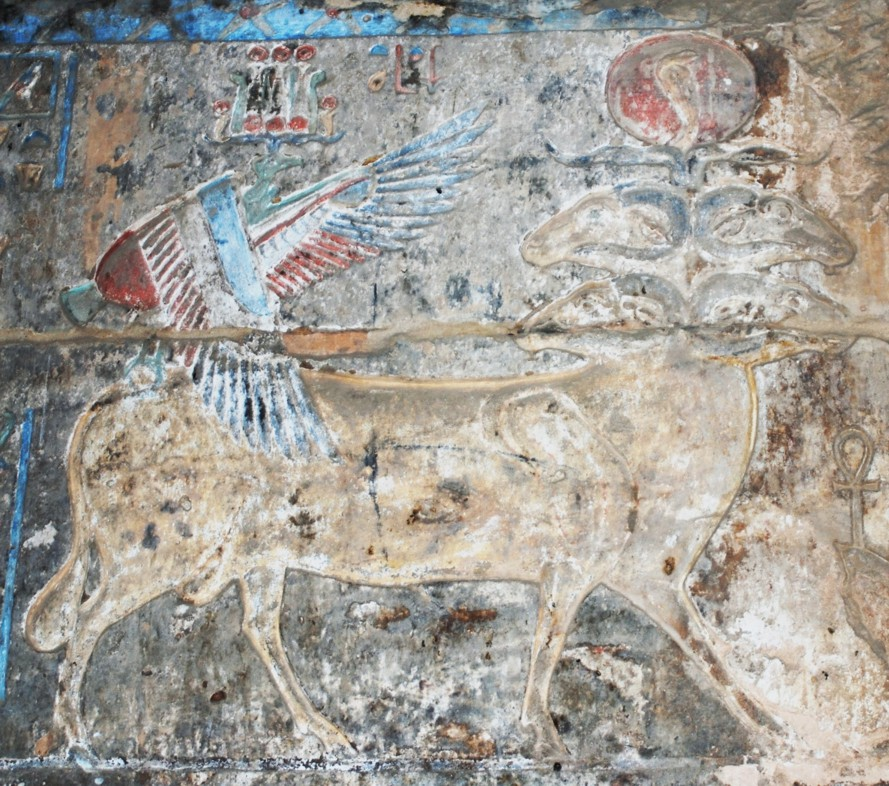
Banebdjedet as a four-headed ram, surmounted by Nekhbet

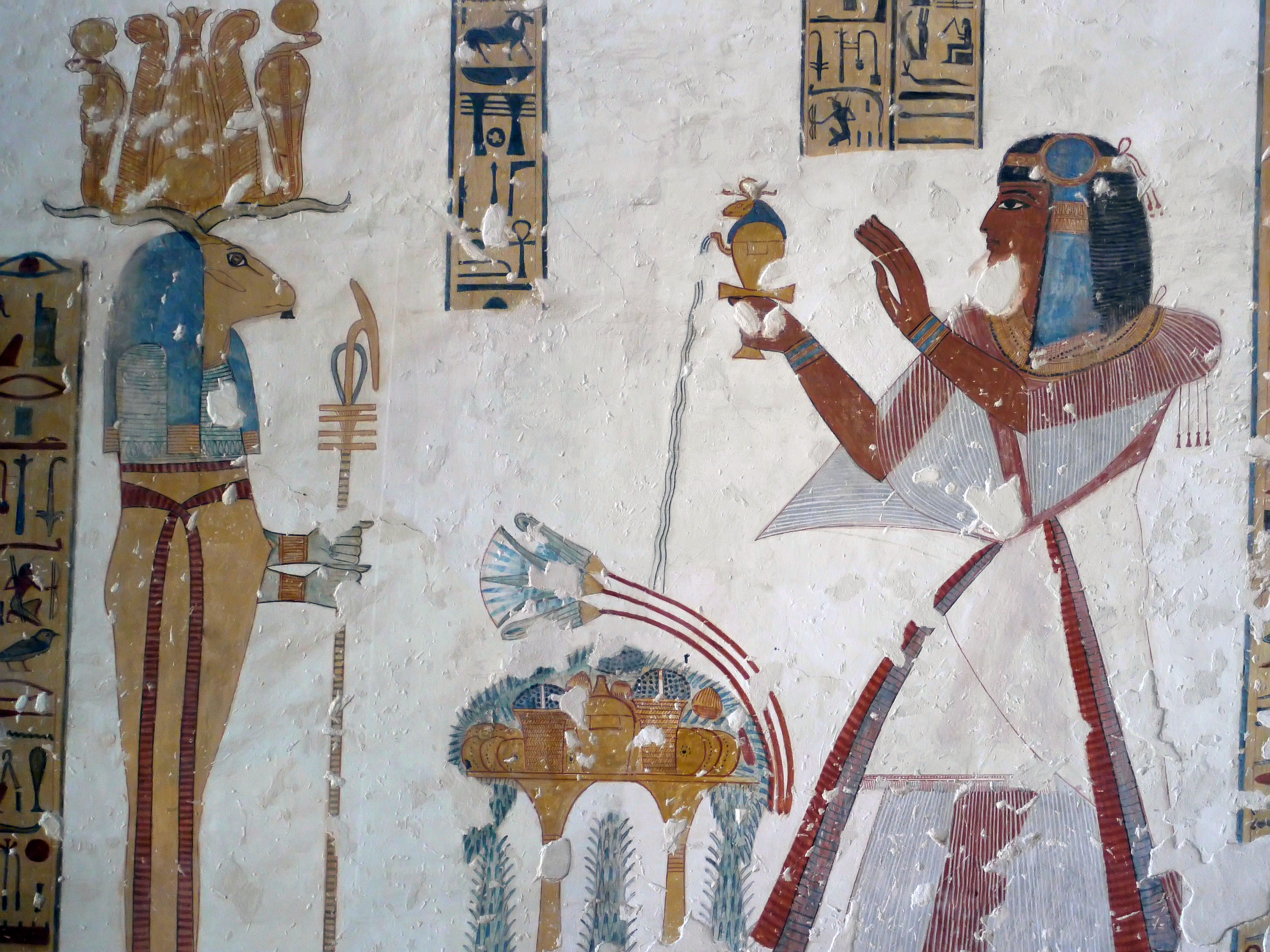
Prince Mentuherkhepeshef giving offerings to a mummiform-depicted Banebdjedet, KV19, 20th dynasty (ca 1129–1111 BC)

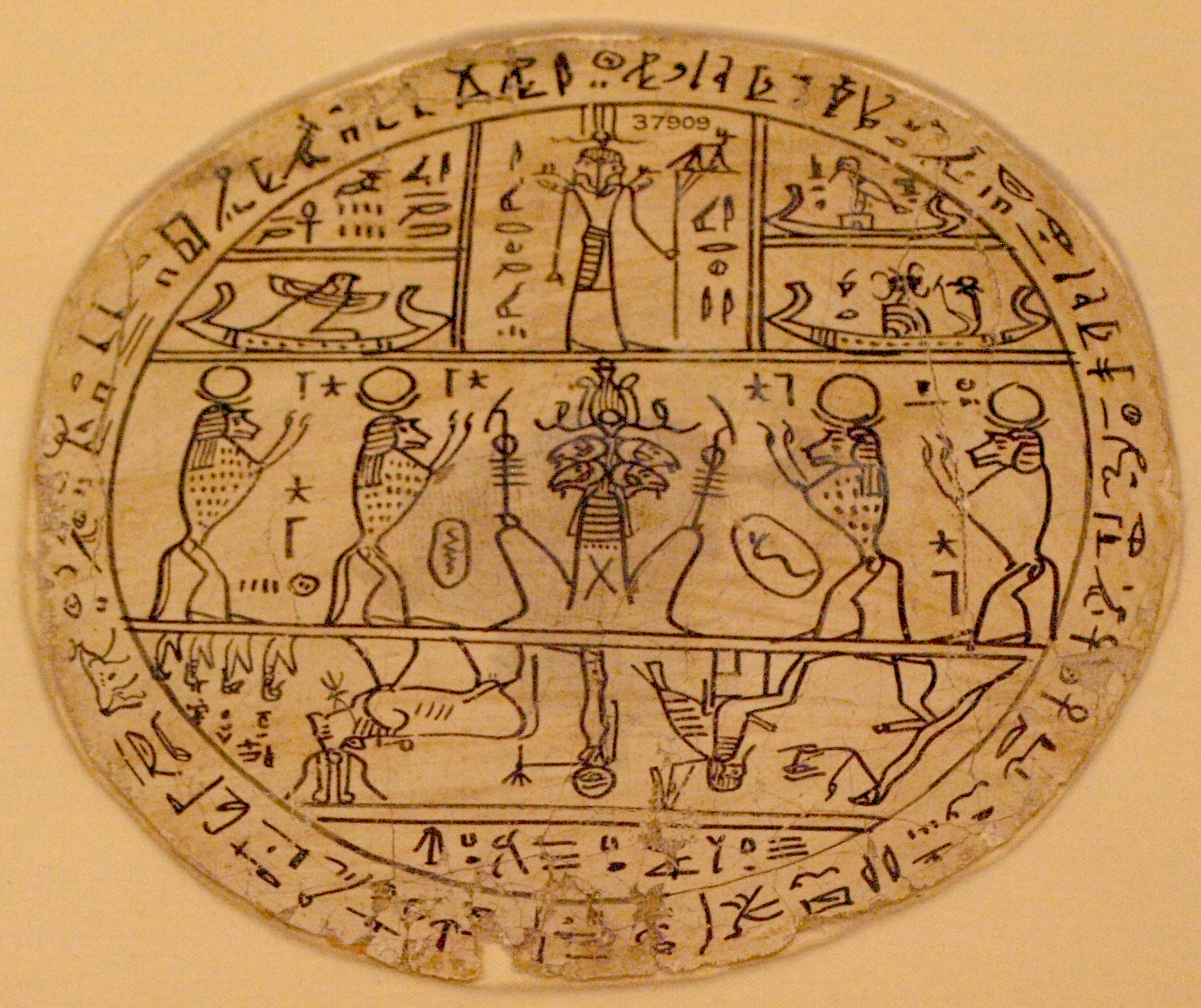
Banebdjedet (center) on the hypocephalus of Tasheritkhons, Ptolemaic Period (ca 305–30 BC), British Museum, London
