= Corn mummy =

Ancient Egyptian sculpture of Osiris

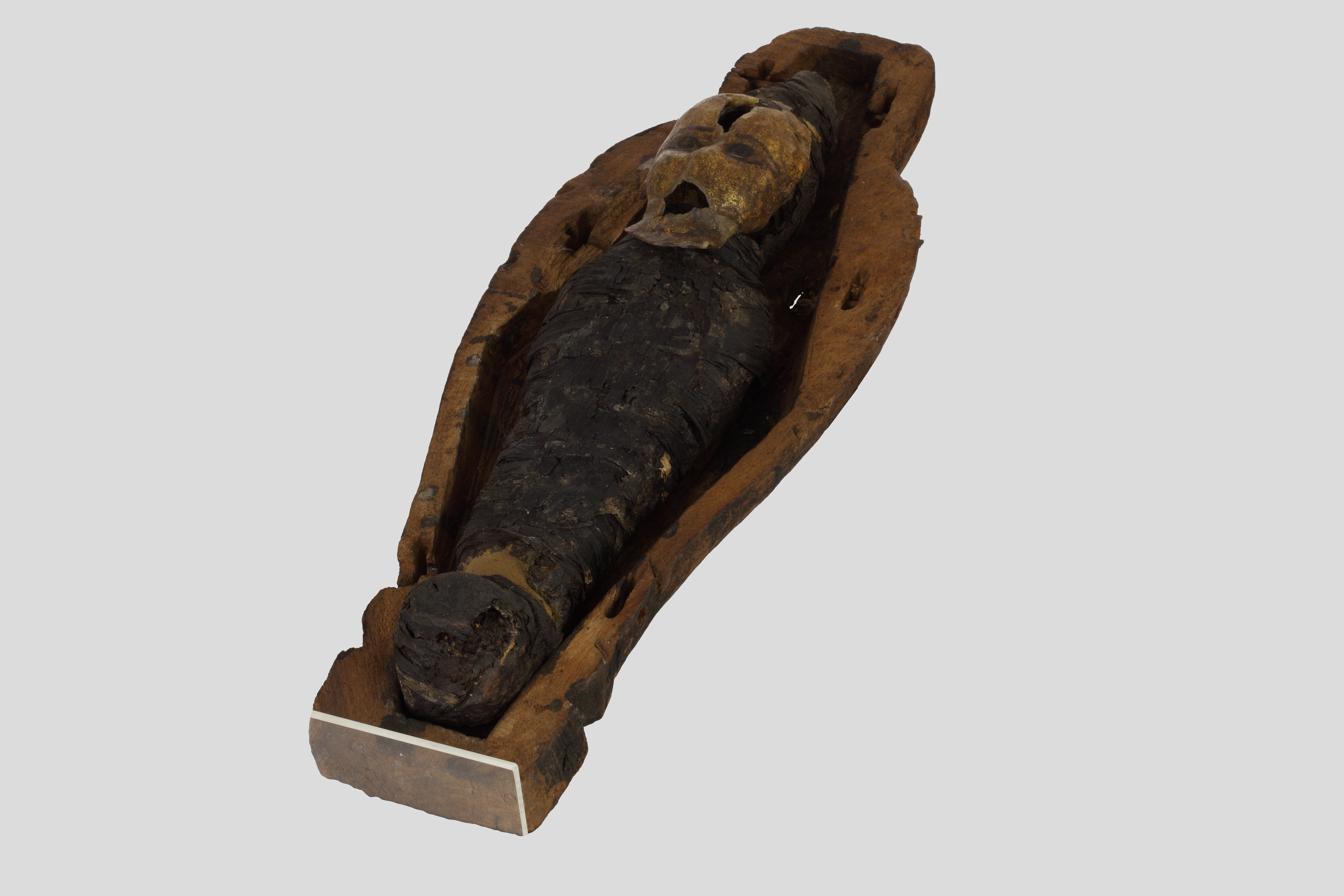
A corn mummy with a wax mask of Osiris, Ptolemaic Dynasty, Archaeological Museum of Kraków

A corn mummy or germinating Osiris is an Ancient Egyptian sculpture of the mummy of Osiris that contained germinated grain seeds, commonly wheat or barley. The rest of the mummy was made up of other materials such as wax, sand and earth. They were fitted with masks most commonly made of wax but sometimes silver. The mummies were provided with wooden coffins.

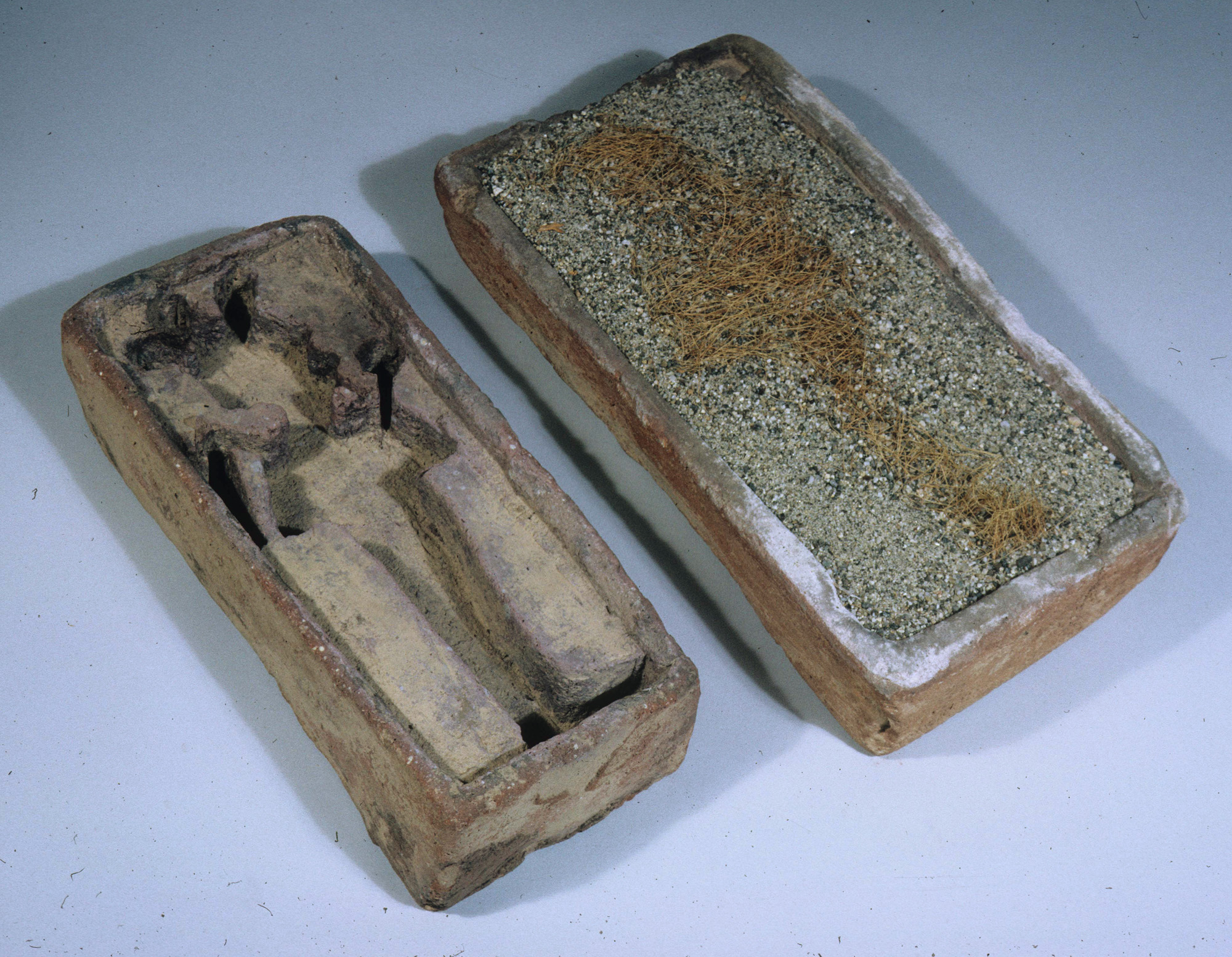
Germinating Osiris, Late Period, Metropolitan Museum of Art

They seem to have been buried as part of certain festivals such as Khoiak. They were also buried in tombs as part of funerary paraphernalia, with a notable example being found in the tomb of Horemheb, KV57, in the Valley of the Kings.
