= German Globetrotter Club =

- German Globetrotter Club Ltd
- Deutsche Zentrale für Globetrotter e.V.
- Abbreviation: DZG
- Named after: The Globetrotters Club
- Established: 1974; 52 years ago
- Founders: Ludmilla Tüting, Friedemann von Engel, Lutz Fehling, Norbert Denninghaus, Erich Drönner, Peter Fritze, Werner Göcke, Wolfgang Köhler, Reinhold Korte and Hannelore Vasel
- Founded at: Haarstorf near Ebstorf, Uelzen
- Registration no.: 5011
- Purpose: Travellers association
- Headquarters: Neubachstraße 115
- Location: 67551 Worms, Germany
- Region served: Worldwide
- Members: 800 (>3,000 since formed)
- Official language: German
- Chairpersons: Petra Decker, Jens Hövelmann
- Website: Globetrotter.org

The German Globetrotter Club Ltd (German: Deutsche Zentrale für Globetrotter e.V.) (DZG) is the largest non-commercial community of adventure travellers with about 800 members in 23 countries in Europe. It is the oldest Globetrotters Club after the British one, called simply "The Globetrotters Club".

== History ==
At a 1974 meeting in Hagen, attended by Ludmilla Tüting, Friedemann von Engel, Lutz Fehling, Norbert Denninghaus, Erich Drönner, Peter Fritze, Werner Göcke, Wolfgang Köhler, Reinhold Korte and Hannelore Vasel, the association was founded. Serving as a model was "The Globetrotters Club" established in 1948 in England. The idea and name came from Tüting, who dedicated her classic 1972 globetrotter handbook Von Alaska bis Feuerland ("From Alaska to Tierra del Fuego") to "the first German club for globetrotters". This alternative travel guide has sold over 70,000 copies.

The association has had more than 3,000 members since it was founded.

=== Deutsche Globetrotter-Zentrale ===
The similarly named "Deutsche Globetrotter-Zentrale" — later Internationale Globetrotter-Zentrale – Interglo, then Globetrott-Zentrale — has no connection to Deutsche Zentrale für Globetrotter. In 1975, Bernd Tesch used the name initially as a brand for his guide book and later established a shop for globetrotting equipment in Kornelimünster, Aachen.

== Goals ==
The club's goals are; the collection and sharing of information, finding travel partners, support in preparing for long-distance travel, the reintegration into society following long-term travel, ideas that bring people together and association work. Between travelling the Club serves as a haven for the like-minded.

Among its members are backpackers, Sahara drivers, camper van owners, outdoor enthusiasts, long-distance hikers, campers, travel cyclists, hitchhikers, endurance motorbike riders and 4by4ers and off-roaders.

Club members see themselves as "Globetrotters", without restricting this to a specific form of travel, rarely as "travellers". They are characterised by a pronounced individualism, identifying with their travels, this fulfillment is the top priority. Globetrotting differs from mass tourism through the individual organisation of trips, and the rejection of package tours.

Because travelling may be incompatible with their professional life, many Globetrotters combine both, by working in tourism, journalism, commercial flying, travel book writing, selling travel supplies or simply as tour guides.

The work of the association is carried out on a voluntary basis; commercial interests are not pursued. Service for non-members is provided at cost price. A member list, accessible to members only, provides a register of destinations and contact information for other members.

== Publications ==
The magazine Der Trotter has been published since 1975. It is published five times a year and bi-monthly since 2007. Around 14,000 editorial pages have appeared so far. About 50% of the content focuses on travel reports, travel book reviews, schedules, invitations to and reports from the Globetrottertreffen, background articles on individual travel and association announcements.

The association has had a website since 1996. It contains a public forum for globetrotter travel partner search, background information on the purpose of the association, information on preparing for travel, book reviews and a members' area. This contains country information with travel reports and downloads of the members' magazine.

== Globetrottertreffen ==
The association has been organising Globetrotter Meetings in Germany since 1974. The annual summer meeting takes place in Hachenburg, Westerwald forest on the last weekend in June. In addition to campfires and talks, there are slideshows and a flea market, workshops and readings by travel book authors. There are also around 12 regional meetings nationwide, an autumn meeting in the Eifel mountains and a winter meeting in the Weser Uplands.

== Selbstreise-Handbuch ==
The Self-Travel Guide came about in response to requests since the club's formation. Frequent interests were initially answered with loose pages, such as the "low-cost flight list" by Udo Schwark, which ethnologist Peter Meyer then bundled into an information booklet in 1984. In 1998, after the ninth edition, this was replaced by the Self-Travel Guide in two volumes, compiled by Norbert Lüdtke on behalf of the DZG, published by Peter Meyer Verlag (PMV), Frankfurt.

== Notable members ==
- Heinz Rox-Schulz, founder of Abenteuermuseums together with Oskar Lafontaine
- Werner Freund founder of the Werner Freund Expedition Museum and Wolf Park in Merzig
- Jochen Bludau
- Gerhard Lenser
- Gunther von Hagens
- Heinz Scheidhauer
- Claus von Carnap-Bornheim
- Gerhard Klingenberg
- Rudolph Chimelli

Numerous members not only wrote about their travel experiences in Der Trotter, but also published travel guides. Their books, the series and publishers they founded had a fundamental influence on the travel literature market and are still well known today.

The earliest authors in the field of individual travel guides, Brigitte Blume, Friedemann von Engel, Rainer Lössl, Jens Peters, Rolf Schettler, Heribert Seul, Ludmilla Tüting, joined together to write the Globetrotter schreiben für Globetrotter (GsfG) ("Globetrotters write for Globetrotters") series. Authors and self-publishers of this series, Helmut Hermann, Edgar Hoff, Peter Rump, Sigrid & Wil Tondok with Peter Meyer Verlag, founded in 1976, formed the Verlegergemeinschaft Individuelles Reisen e.V. (VIR) ("Publishers' Association Individual Travel Company Ltd") in 1984/85.

From this emerged the Travel Know-How Publishing Group. Peter Meyer Verlag has been operating independently again since 1991 and was the first in the world to provide index tabs on its travel books. Members Udo Schwark and Gisela Walther were the first to translate the Lonely Planet travel guides from English and formed the Gisela Walther Verlag in 1981. Founders of publishing houses Stefan Loose, Michael Müller, Conrad Stein were also members of the DZG.

A number of other members rose to prominence after they started selling travel equipment and now dominate this sector of the market. In 1976, Klaus and Erika Därr opened the first retail travel, globetrotter and expedition equipment store, Därr Expeditionsservice, beginning the globetrotter scene in Munich. Gerhardt Lauche and Wolfgang Maas founded Expeditionsausrüstung Lauche und Maas in Munich in 1978. Klaus Denart and Peter Lechhart founded Globetrotter Ausrüstung in Hamburg as the first North German supplier, and is one of the largest travel supplier in Europe.
