= Million Amazing Women =

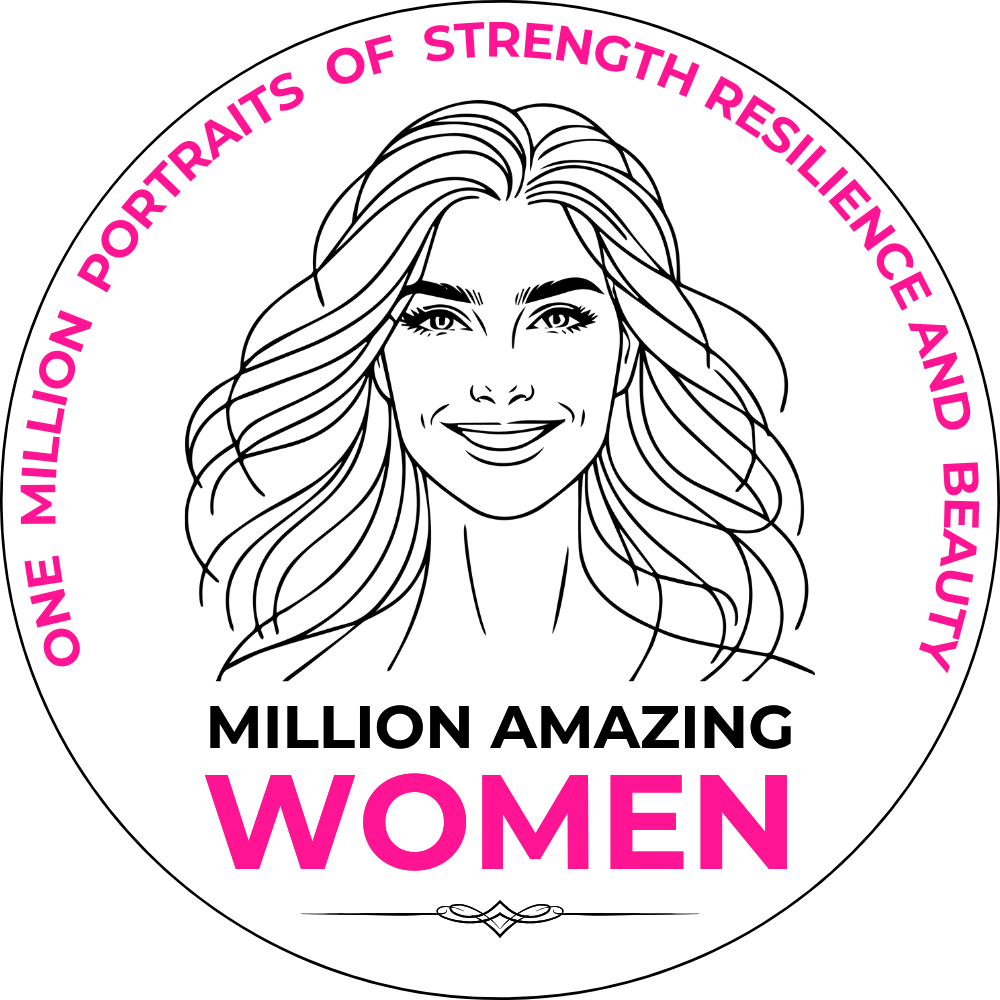

Million Amazing Women is a global photographic expedition aimed at capturing one million portraits of women from all 195 countries. Bharadwaj Dayala will travel across the globe to photograph women from diverse cultures, backgrounds, and walks of life.

== Global Tour ==
Million Amazing Women is an extended road expedition covering all 195 countries across 7 continents. It is a longterm women empowerment project with an estimated timespan of 12 years. Bharadwaj Dayala and his team will travel to each country, while photographing and documenting women in their natural environments.

== Launch and timeline ==
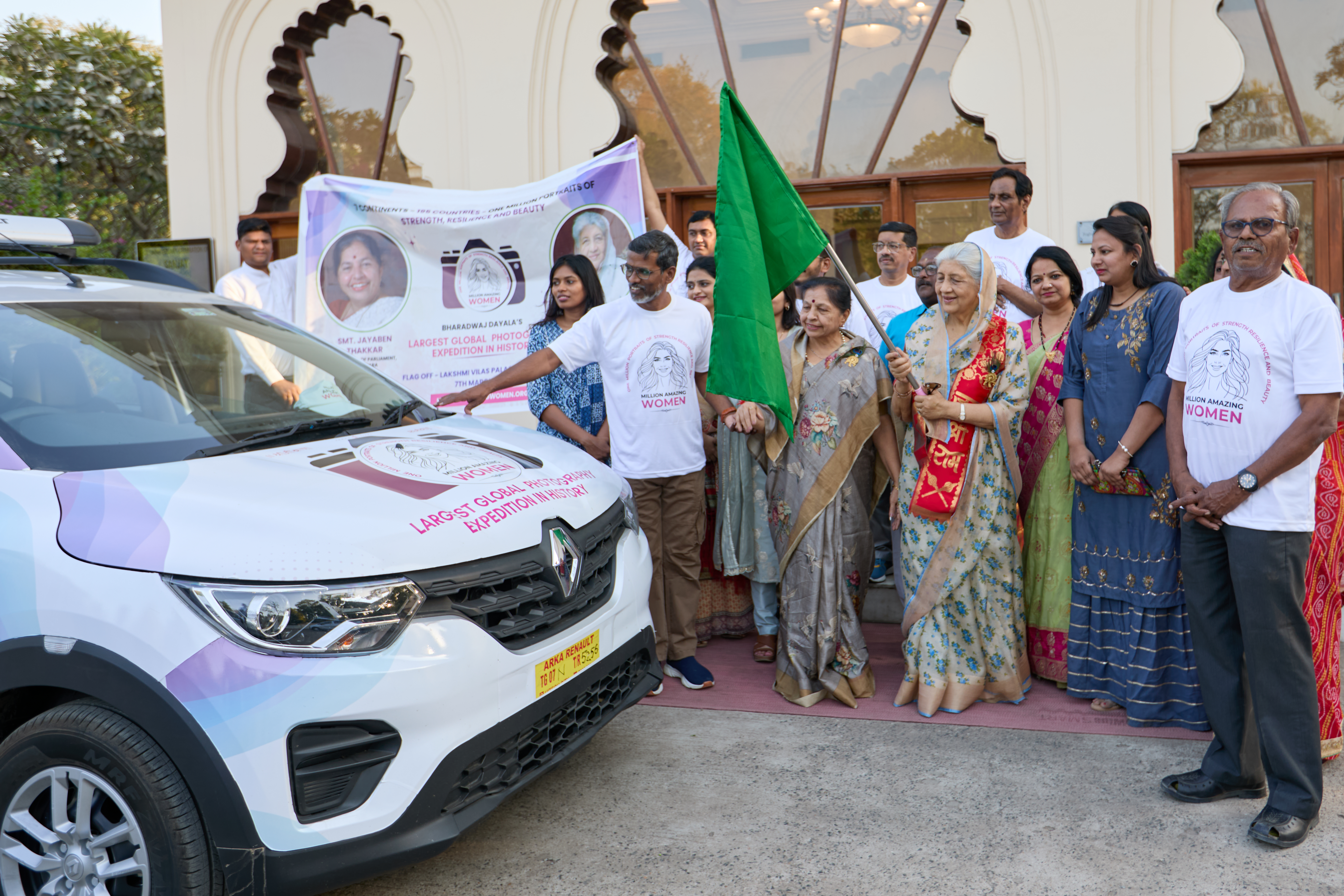
Rajmata Subhangini Raje Ranjitsinh Gaekwad flags off the start of the Million Amazing Women campaign

The project was officially announced on January 10, 2025.

The Million Amazing Women project was officially flagged off on 7th March 2025 by Her Highness Rajmata Subhangini Raje Ranjitsinh Gaekwad from the majestic Lakshmi Vilas Palace in Vadodara, Gujarat.
