= BMW R12 (2024) =

Motorcycle of BMW Motorrad

R12
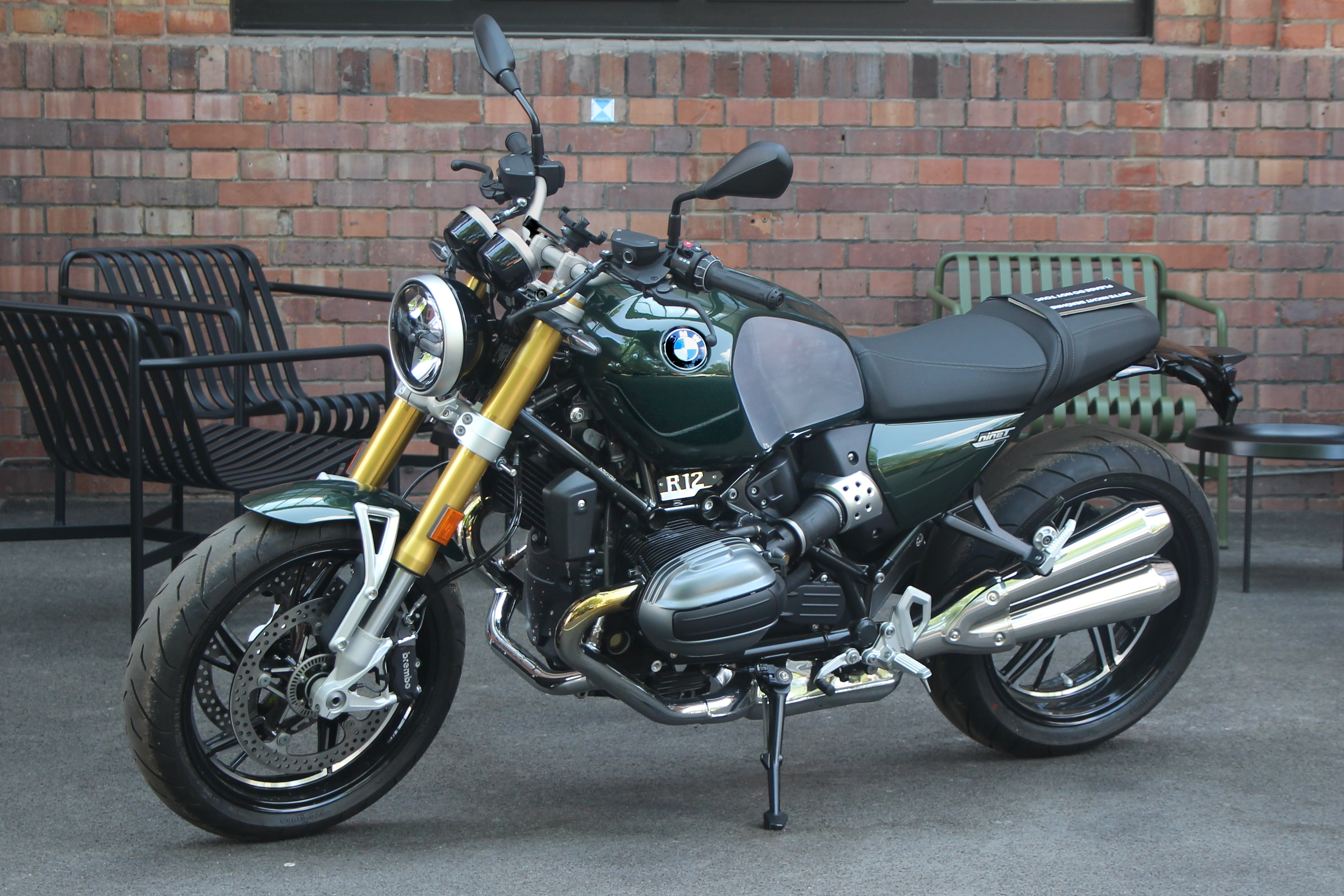
- BMW R12 nineT
- Manufacturer: BMW Motorrad
- Parent company: BMW
- Production: 2023–
- Predecessor: BMW R nineT
- Class: Cruiser, standard
- Engine: 1,170 cc (71 cu in) two-cylinder boxer
- Bore / stroke: 101 mm × 73 mm (4.0 in × 2.9 in)
- Compression ratio: 12.0 :1
- Top speed: 126–134 mph (203–215 km/h)
- Power: 95–109 hp (71–81 kW) @ 6,500-7,000 rpm
- Torque: 110–115 N⋅m (81–85 lbf⋅ft) @ 6,000-6,500 rpm
- Transmission: Dry clutch, 6-speed, shaft drive
- Suspension: Front: telescopic fork, Rear: double swingarm with central shock strut
- Brakes: Dual disc front, single disc rear (ABS)
- Wheelbase: 1,520 mm (60 in) (R12); 1,511 mm (59.5 in) (R12 nineT)
- Dimensions: L: 2,200 mm (87 in) (R12); 2,130 mm (84 in) (R12 nineT); W: 830 mm (33 in) (R12); 870 mm (34 in) (R12 nineT); H: 1,110 mm (44 in) (R12); 1,070 mm (42 in) (R12 nineT)
- Seat height: 75.4 cm (29.7 in) (R12); 79.5 cm (31.3 in) (R12 nineT)
- Weight: 220–227 kg (485–500 lb) (wet)
- Fuel capacity: 14 L (3.1 imp gal; 3.7 US gal)

The BMW R12 is a motorcycle manufactured by BMW Motorrad, which is offered as the cruiser motorcycle R12 and as the roadster R12 nineT (with the English pronunciation ['naɪnti]). The name "R12", which had already been used by BMW for a motorcycle model from the 1930s, was re-protected by the manufacturer in 2021 in Germany and internationally in 2022. Both models were presented at the end of November 2023 as the successor to the R nineT introduced ten years earlier.

== Construction ==
Both R12 models have an air and oil-cooled four-valve two-cylinder engine with 1170 cm^{3} displacement and a balance shaft. The stroke is 73 mm, the compression ratio is 12.0:1. It has an engine drag torque control and was tuned differently for the two models: the R 12 has an output of 70 kW at 6500 rpm and a maximum torque of 110 Nm at 6000 rpm, the nineT has an output of 80 kW at 7000 rpm and a torque of 115 Nm at 6500 rpm. The engine of both models can be throttled to 35 kW at 5250 rpm; then the torque is 98 Nm at 3000 rpm. An airbox is installed under the seat. The machine can be started with a radio key (Keyless Ride). Similar to the R18, the R12 offers the driving modes Roll (standard) and Rock with a more direct response when turning the throttle; the nineT has three settings: Road, Rain and Dynamic. The engine meets the Euro 5+ emissions requirements. The steel tank holds 14 liters, the aluminum tank of the nineT 16 liters. According to the World Motorcycle Test Cycle (WMTC), the consumption of both models is 5.1 liters/100 km.

=== Chassis ===
The R12 has a steel tubular space frame with an aluminum swing arm at the rear. At the front, the motorcycle has a 45 mm upside-down fork, which is only adjustable on the nineT model. The suspension travel on the R 12 is 90 mm front and rear, on the nineT it is 30 mm more. The models also differ in tire size: the R 12 has a 19-inch wheel at the front and a 16-inch wheel at the rear, while the R 12 nineT has two 17-inch wheels. This gives the nineT a 41 mm higher seat height of 795 mm. Cast aluminum is used for the wheels, and spoked wheels are available on request; the tires are tubeless, which also saves weight. The brakes are supported by ABS with lean angle consideration (partially integrated ABS). The handbrake lever operates the front and rear brakes simultaneously.

=== Other ===
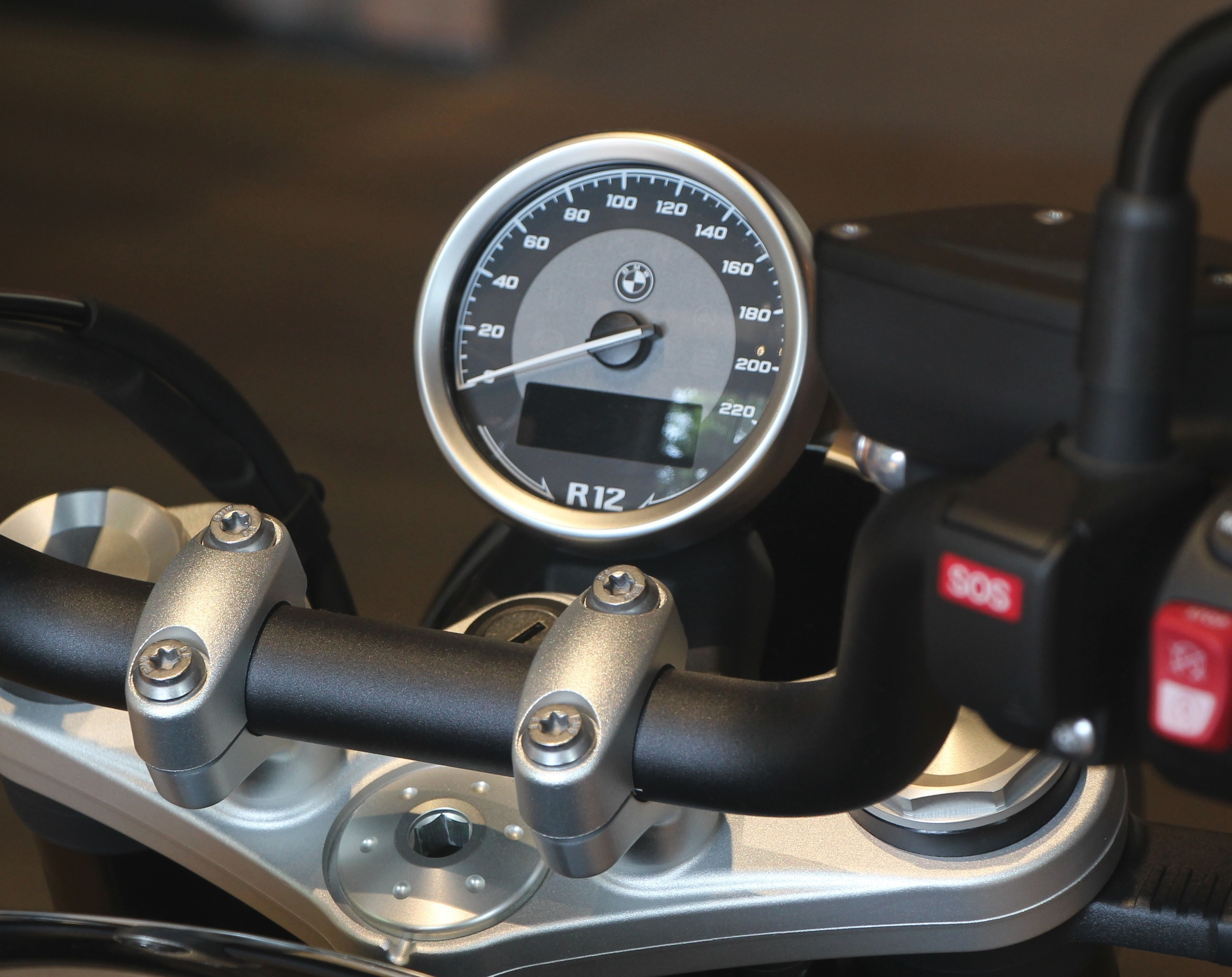
R12 basic equipment, single speedometer

In addition to other special equipment and accessories, cornering lights are offered. A tachometer (standard equipment on the nineT) can be added to the R 12. Both models can also be equipped with a digital instrument cluster (display with a diagonal of 3.5 inches).
