= BMW R12 and R17 =

Motorcycle used extensively by Germany in World War 2

BMW R12
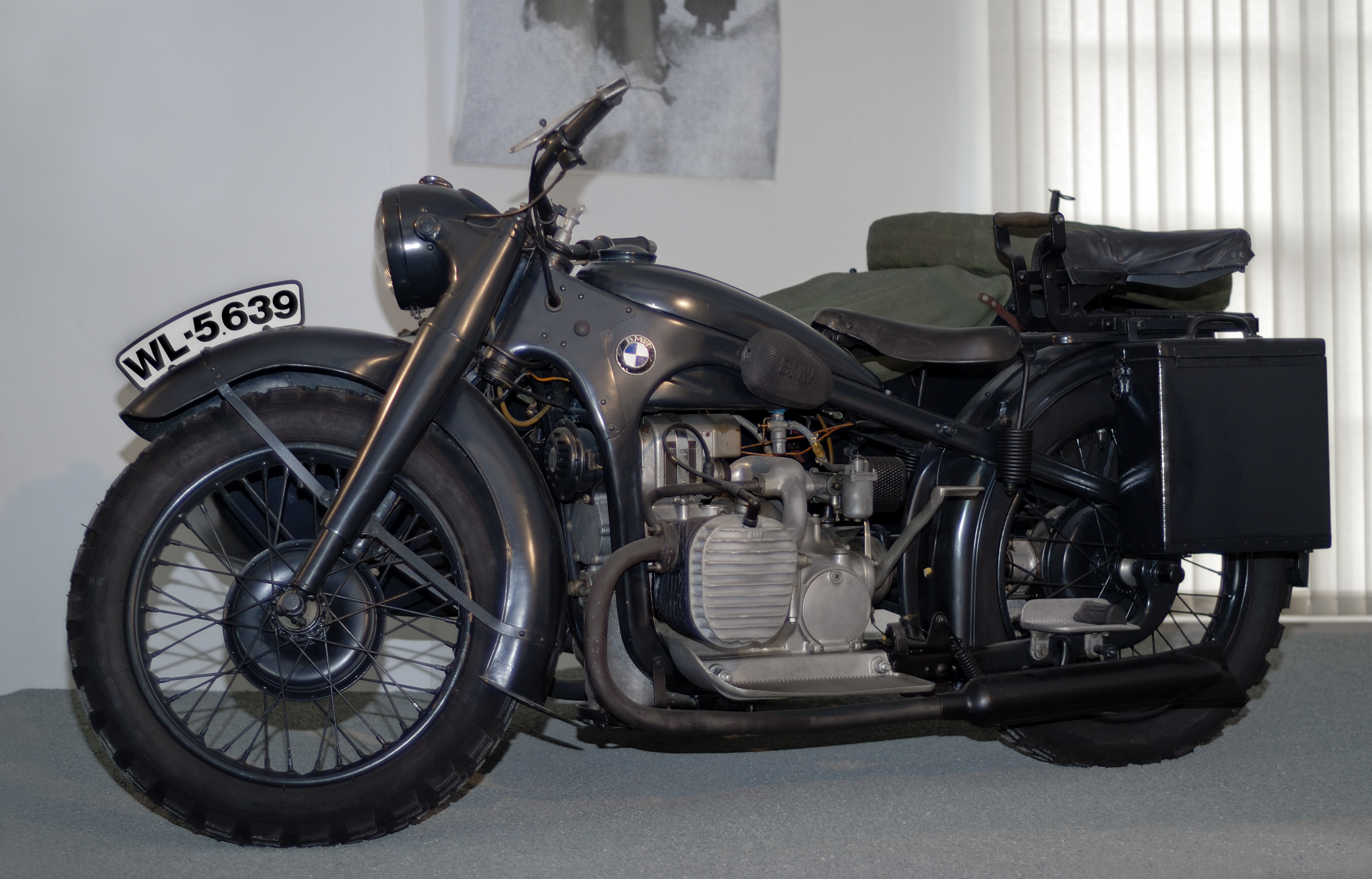
- Manufacturer: BMW Motorrad
- Production: 1935–1942
- Assembly: Munich, Germany
- Predecessor: R11
- Engine: 745 cc (45.5 cu in) Side-valve 4-stroke flat twin, Overhead valve 4-stroke flat twin
- Bore / stroke: 78 mm × 78 mm (3.1 in × 3.1 in)
- Compression ratio: 5.2:1
- Top speed: 110 km (68 mi) - 120 km (75 mi)
- Power: 18 hp (13 kW)
- Ignition type: Magneto or battery ignition
- Transmission: Manual
- Tires: 3.50×19
- Dimensions: L: 210 cm (83 in); W: 90 cm (35 in); H: 94 cm (37 in)
- Fuel capacity: 14 L (3.1 imp gal; 3.7 US gal)
- Fuel consumption: 3.5–4 litres per 100 kilometres (81–71 mpg_{‑imp}; 67–59 mpg_{‑US})

The BMW R12 and R17 are flat-twin engine motorcycles made by BMW Motorrad from 1935 through 1942. They were developed in 1935 based on the R7 concept of 1934. A few hundred R17s were made, ending in 1937, while the R12 continued through 1942, with a total of 36,008 produced.

== R7 concept ==
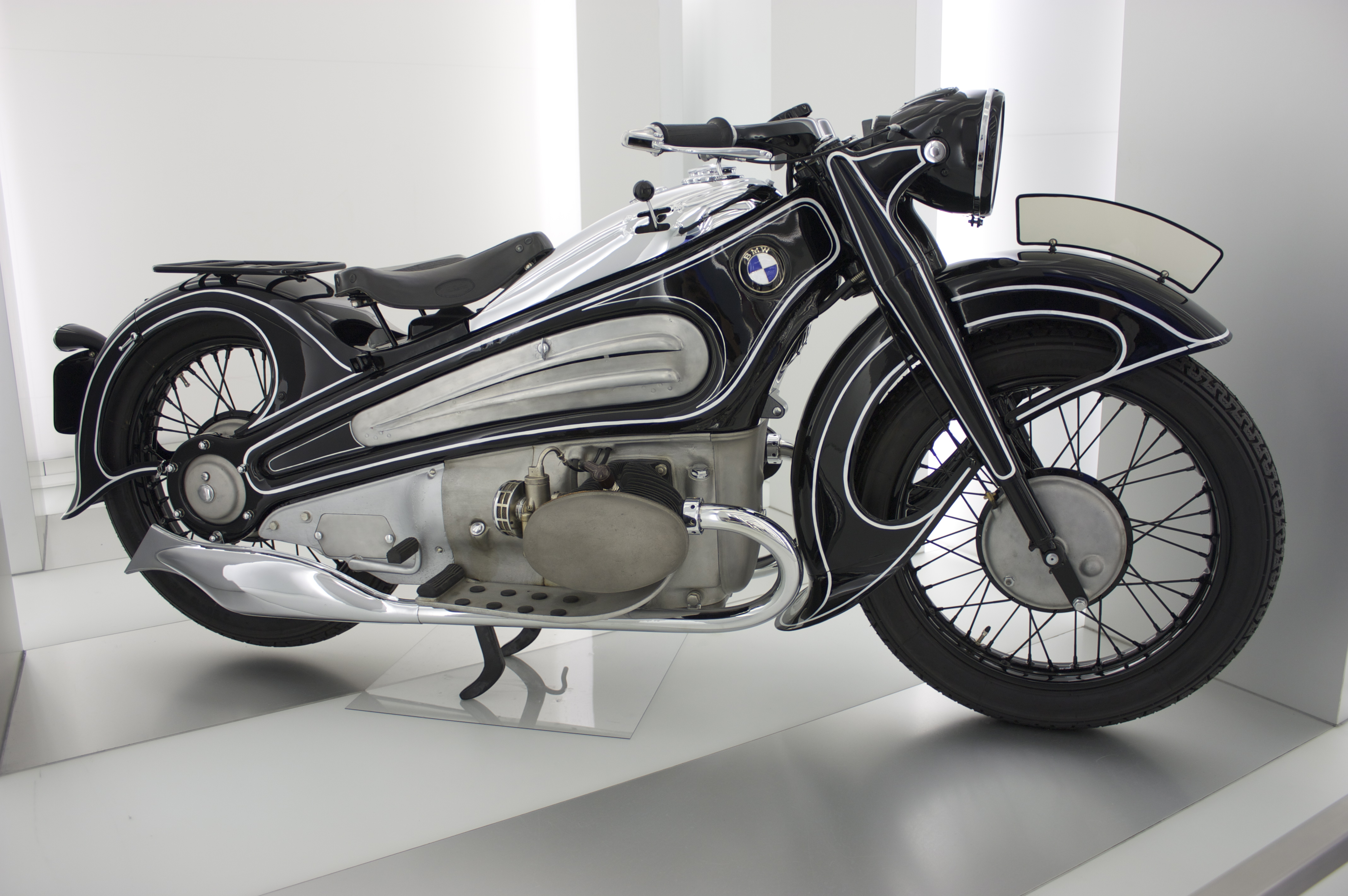
1934 BMW R7

The BMW R7 was conceived in 1933 by engineer and designer Alfred Böning, with an Art Deco mathematical geometric basis of his design. Only one R7 was ever made, which Böning disassembled and stuck away with design plans in a BMW warehouse. It was discovered more than seventy years later, in 2005. Hans Keckeisen in Munich began a restoration on behalf of the BMW Museum, completed 2012. After appearing in European bike shows, restored 1934 R7 was first shown in the US at the Pebble Beach Concours d'Elegance.

Böning's new hydraulic fork design of the 1934 R7 went into production the following year, in the 1934 R12 and R17.

== R12 and R17 ==
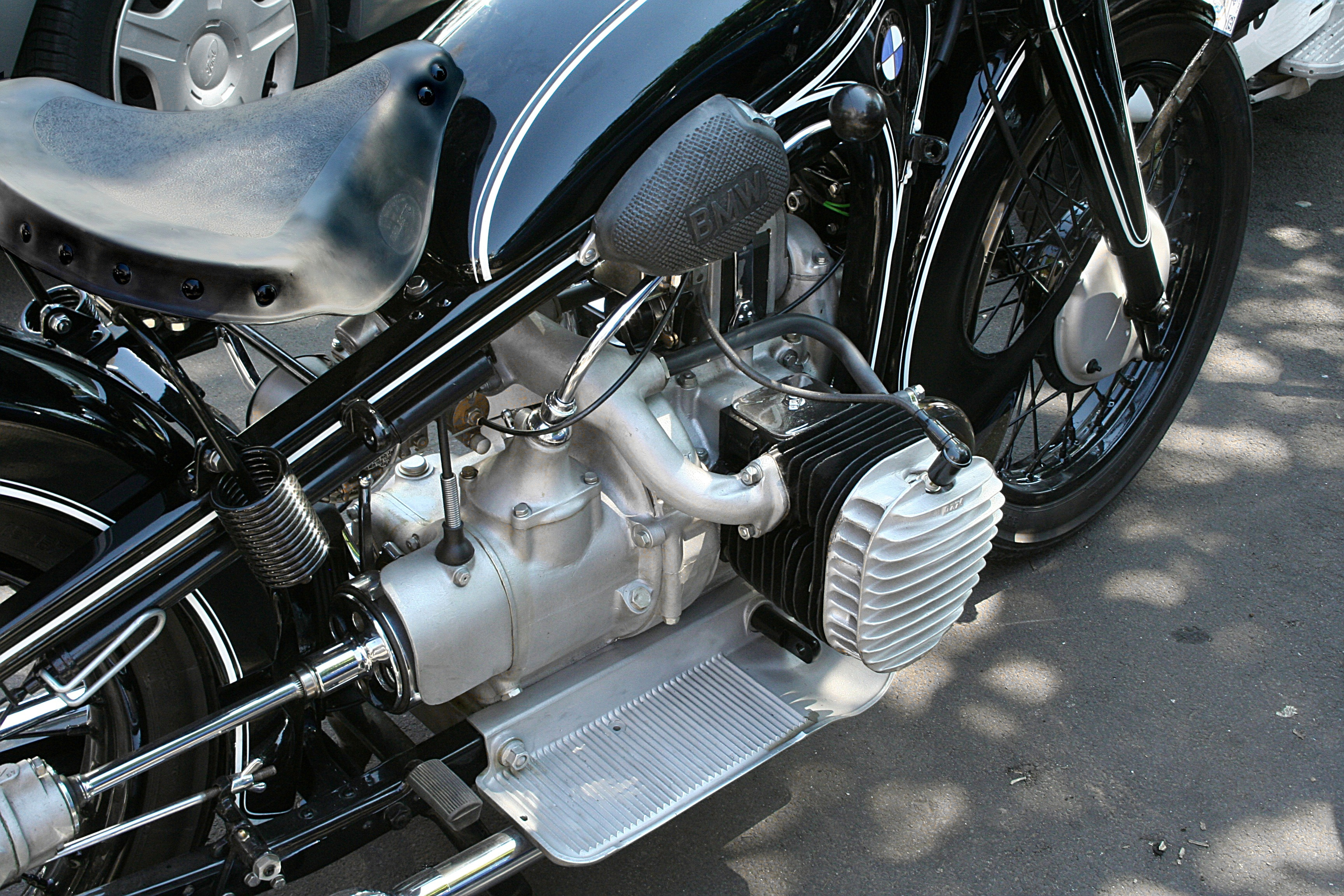
BMW R12 engine

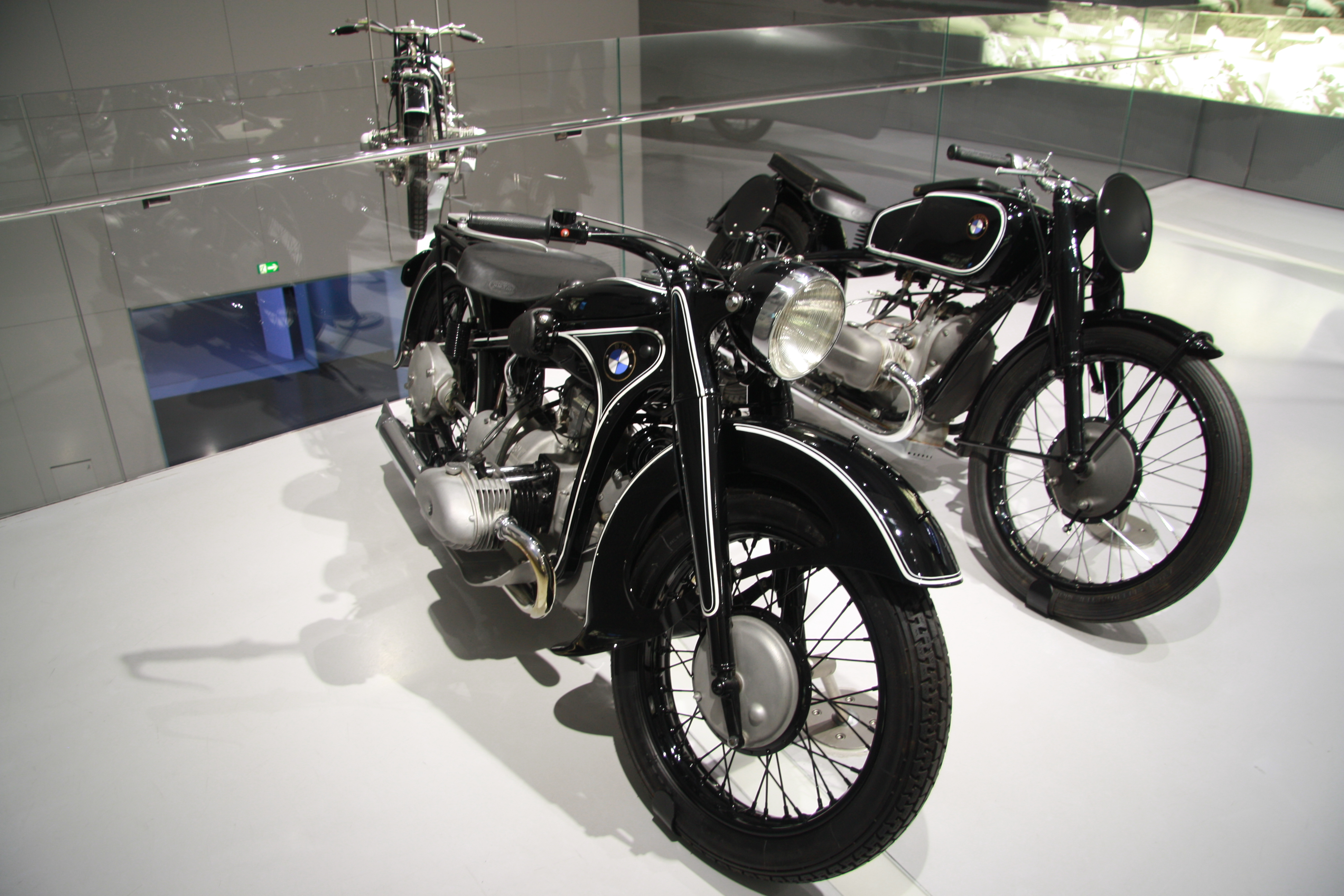
BMW R17 in BMW-Museum in Munich

On 14 February 1935, BMW presented the R12 together with the R17 on the German Automobile Exhibition in Berlin for the first time, being a direct successor to the BMW R11. This and the R17 were the first in the world being produced with hydraulically damped telescopic forks. By 1942, the total number of BMW R12 motorcycles manufactured was 36,000. For military purposes, the single carburetor Einvergasermotor was only available for the R12.

=== Engine ===
The engine, designated M 56 S 6 or 212, was a twin-cylinder boxer configuration - four stroke with a flathead design. The BMW R12 with two carburetors used a battery and coil ignition, while R12s with a single carburetor used a magneto ignition, capable of working independently from the battery.

=== Drive ===
The BMW R12 had a four-speed manual gearbox, operated by a hand shift lever on the fuel tank's right side. Several detail variations were seen in production. In common with most BMW Motorcycles, final drive was via shaft, with the drive shaft on the right side of the motorcycle.

=== Suspension and brakes ===
Front suspension used a telescopic fork, while the frame was rigid with an un-sprung rear end supporting the final drive and a sprung seat for the rider. The R12 used drum brakes front and rear. Many R12's were equipped with a sidecar attached to the motorcycle's right side.

== Specifications ==
	R12	R17
Years	1935–1942	1935–1937
Number produced	36,008	434
Engine	M56 S6 (single carburetor) or M56 212 (two carburetors)	M60 (two carburetors)
Type	Side-valve 4-stroke flat twin	Overhead valve 4-stroke flat twin
Displacement	745 cc (45.5 cu in)	736 cc (44.9 cu in)
Bore × stroke	78 mm × 78 mm (3.1 in × 3.1 in)	83 mm × 68 mm (3.3 in × 2.7 in)
Compression ratio	5.2:1	6.5:1
Fuel system	Sum CK 25 mm or 2 × Amal 6/406/407 23.8 mm	2 × Amal 76/424 1-inch
Ignition	Magneto or battery	
Transmission	4-speed, shaft drive	
Suspension	Front: telescopic fork Rear: rigid	
Tires/wheels	Front & rear: 3.5×19/3×19	
Brakes	Front & rear: 200 mm drum	
Frame	Twin loop, pressed steel	
Power	18 hp (13 kW) or 20 hp (15 kW) (2 carburetor)	33 hp (25 kW) @ 5,000 rpm
Top speed	110 km/h (68 mph) or 120 km/h (75 mph) (2 carburetor)	
Dry weight	162 kg (357 lb)	165 kg (364 lb)
Fuel capacity	14 L (3.1 imp gal; 3.7 US gal)	

== Surviving motorcycles ==
A BMW R12 is in the Museum of Military History in Vienna, in its original camouflage. In 2018, an American company created a modified BMW R nineT with a close resemblance to the original R7, showing the R7-inspired custom at several shows and museums, and selling kits or complete bikes to the public.

== See also ==
- History of BMW motorcycles
