= BMW C600 Sport and C650GT =

BMW C600/C650 Sport and C650GT
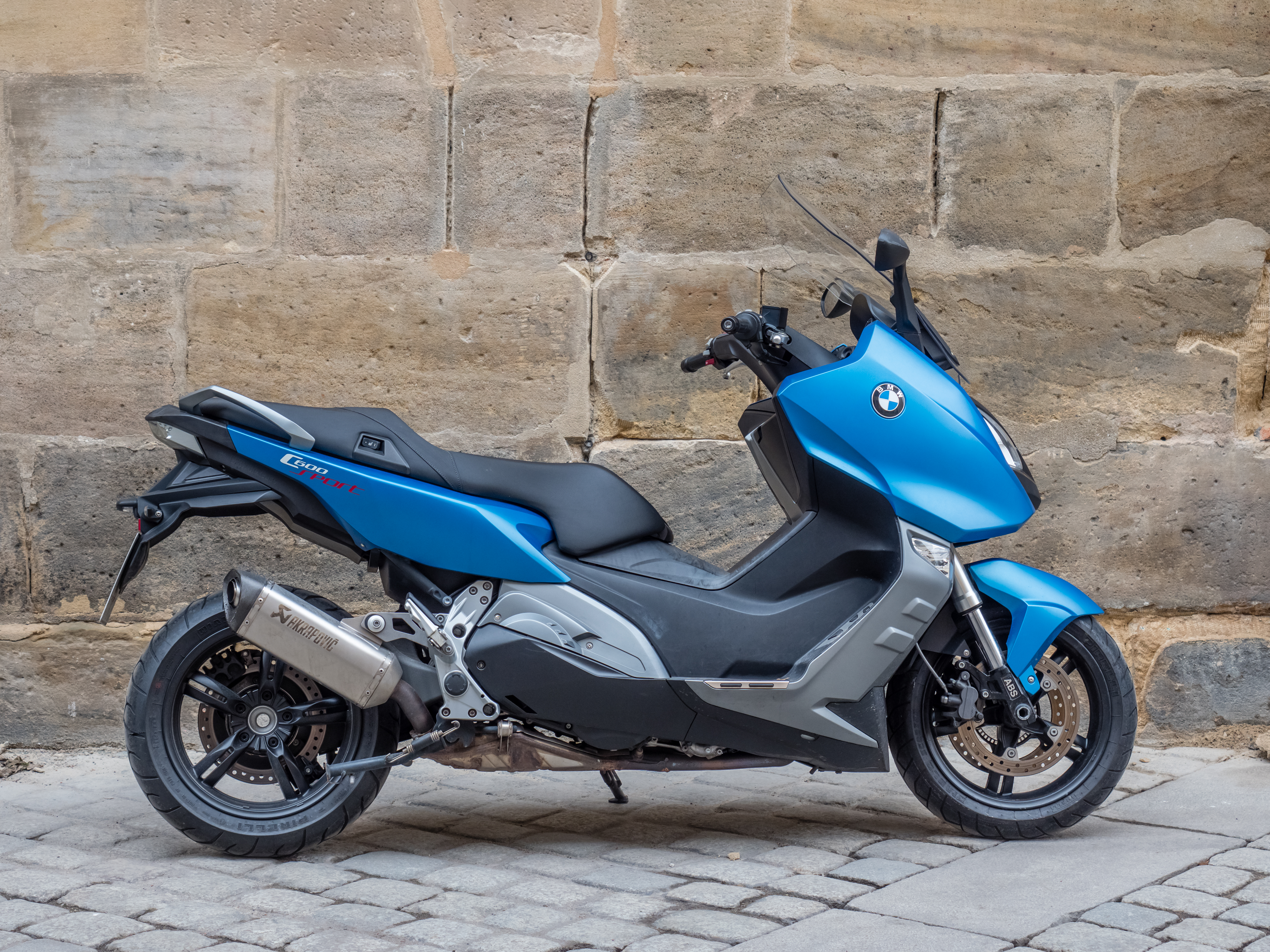
- BMW C600 Sport
- Manufacturer: BMW Motorrad
- Production: 2012-2020
- Assembly: Spandau, Germany
- Class: Maxi-scooter
- Engine: BMW W20K06U0 647 cc (39.5 cu in) parallel twin
- Bore / stroke: 79 mm × 66 mm (3.11 in × 2.60 in)
- Compression ratio: 11.6:1
- Top speed: 109 mph (175 km/h)
- Power: 60 hp (45 kW) @ 7,500 rpm
- Torque: 49 pound-feet (66 N⋅m) @ 6,000 rpm
- Transmission: CVT, oil-bath chain
- Frame type: Steel trellis
- Suspension: 40 mm non-adjustable inverted fork
- Brakes: 2-piston calipers, twin 270 mm discs front, single 270 mm disc rear
- Tires: 15-inch, 120/70 front, 160/60 rear
- Wheelbase: 1,591 mm (62.6 in)
- Weight: 261 kg (575 lb) (GT); 249 kg (549 lb) (Sport) (wet)
- Fuel capacity: 16 L (3.5 imp gal; 4.2 US gal)
- Fuel consumption: 48–56 mpg_{‑imp} (5.9–5.0 L/100 km; 40–47 mpg_{‑US})

The BMW C600/C650 Sport and C650GT are maxi-scooters produced by BMW Motorrad. They are the company's first scooter since the C1, which was manufactured by Bertone. The line was announced by BMW at EICMA in late 2010. Current members of the series are the C600 Sport and the C650 GT, both powered by 647 cc parallel twin gasoline engines. Production began at BMW's Spandau plant in December 2011, and they were expected to be available in Europe in Spring 2012, and in the US in Fall 2012 for the 2013 model year. BMW has shown an electric motorcycle concept vehicle based on a similar size frame and similar styling.

The C-series engine is built by Kymco company in Taiwan.

The front wheel fender directs the road dirt towards the radiator, causing clogging issues and engine overheating.

Reports have stated BMW expects three quarters of sales to be to buyers in southern Europe.
