= Norman Hossack =

Scottish inventor and engineer

Norman Hugh Hossack is a Scottish inventor and engineer, who invented the Hossack motorcycle front suspension system, used on some BMW Motorrad K series motorcycles.

== Early life ==
Norman Hossack was born in Bellshill, Scotland, and grew up in Rhodesia. Hossack's father, also an inventor, developed methods to pump water in Africa. Hossack's grandfather built and patented dry cell batteries as far back as 1910.

Hossack learned to ride motorcycles at a young age on the uncluttered roads of Rhodesia. His first bikes were a BSA Bantam, a Greeves scrambler and a Ducati 250 Mach 1, which he raced. This racing bug took Hossack to the Isle of Man TT in 1969. The following year Hossack worked as a mechanic for fellow Rhodesian and Manx winner Gordon Keith on a tour of the Continental racing circus. Hossack's talents were spotted by young Barry Sheene who offered him a job, but Hossack took a job with Bruce McLaren Motor Racing in 1972. Hossack spent the next three years learning his craft and honing his skills as a chassis builder, mechanic, and pit crew member. Hossack worked 3 years on the Indy team, and in 1974 McLaren won the Indy 500, and the F1 championship. He was later involved with other motor racing projects including 3 stints at the 24 Hours of Le Mans, twice as race planner and manager.

== Inventions ==
Hossack's first invention was his two-stroke engine, inspired by the Wankel engine, which was the holy grail of the automobile industry at the time. The first Hossack prototype engine was built in 1973 and was run in the McLaren work shop. The second engine, a more serious build, is still a runner today.

The Hossack suspension system came into being in the years after Hossack left McLaren. It started with some sketches then moved to a wire coat hanger experiment. The next step was to turn it into metal which became Hossack 1, a championship winning racer.

In 2001, Hossack moved to the USA designing scanners used in the medical industry. Hossack's name is on several patents in the medical devices industry. These IVUS scanners (Intra Vascular Ultrasound) are used to see inside the vessels around the heart.

In 2010, Hossack turned his thinking to mountain bikes. Teased by his workmates in the Medical company he worked in, he took up the challenge. The motive here was to create an attachment to a standard bicycle frame rather than a Hossack type suspension system.

== Hossack suspension system ==
The Hossack front suspension system consists of two wish-bones, an upright and steering linkage. Similar components are found on the front of all racing cars, the only significant difference being in the up-right which has its geometry rearranged. The wish-bones look and work exactly like their racing car equivalent. The up-right performs the same task as its racing car equivalent but has its axle rotated through 90 degrees and over hung. The steering link does the same job as its name sake in car suspension. There is a handle bar pivot but this carries none of the suspension loadings and only has to handle the weight of the rider's upper half. The spring/damper element can be run in several different positions to achieve different conditions as is also common in the racing car world.

== Racers ==
After leaving McLaren, Hossack started on motorcycle design, applying his accumulated knowledge to the design of his first machine, developing a unique front suspension system which he formulated using a wire coat hanger and a piece of wood. Wheels and parts were sourced from a scrap yard to build a rudimentary test-bed, and finally an XL500 Honda engine was donated by a friend. Although built only to test the theory, this very bike proved successful enough to graduate to the race track. Updated with Astralite wheels, it later went on to win the British Single Cylinder Championship in 1986, 1987 and 1988 ridden by Vernon Glashier, who still owns the bike.

By late 1982 the third Hossack bike was ready to race and was designed to fit the 350cc Yamaha TZ and RD engines. In 1983 several well-known journalists had ridden Hossack 3, including Alan Cathcart, Ray Knight and Mat Oxley. Hossack went on to build more versions of his design for other engines which include Ducati, Suzuki and Laverda.

== BMW K100 ==
Finding club racing changing towards production models Hossack next turned his hand to street models – first the PDQ Kawasaki and later a BMW K100. Hossack set himself the task with the K100 to use as many standard parts as practical and make it handle and stop better. In the process the final product was 12 lb (5.4 kg) lighter than the standard unit, and possessed all the advantages that BMW later claimed for the K series bikes. This Hossack-BMW conversion was popular in Germany where the design received a TUV type-approval for sale. One of Hossack's conversions was taken to BMW's headquarters in Munich where it was shown to their management and run on their test track. Unfortunately for Hossack, BMW was in the final stages of releasing its Telelever suspension system.

== Triumph conversion ==
Hossack's last bike conversion was a Triumph Trident 900 in 1994, commissioned by Formula 1 entrepreneur Keith Duckworth. This proved to be an ideal application, as the cylinder heads of the triple offered an ideal mounting point for the lower wishbone. The conversion worked well but never went further than that one prototype.

== Post motorcycles ==
During the 1990s, after leaving the motorcycle design world behind, Hossack spent several years inventing machines for the packaging industry before taking a position in the medical device industry. He was involved in designing IVUS scanners which are used to visualize the vessels around the heart. That company called IRL was bought out, and the new company moved Hossack and his family to the US.

Following his move to California in 2001, Hossack applied his inventiveness and engineering skills to develop devices for the medical field, specializing in IVUS (Intra Vascular Ultra Sound) and is named on several patents in this field. During this time he also designed a mountain bike suspension system and applied his front suspension system to a Ducati SS 800.
