= BMW C400 =

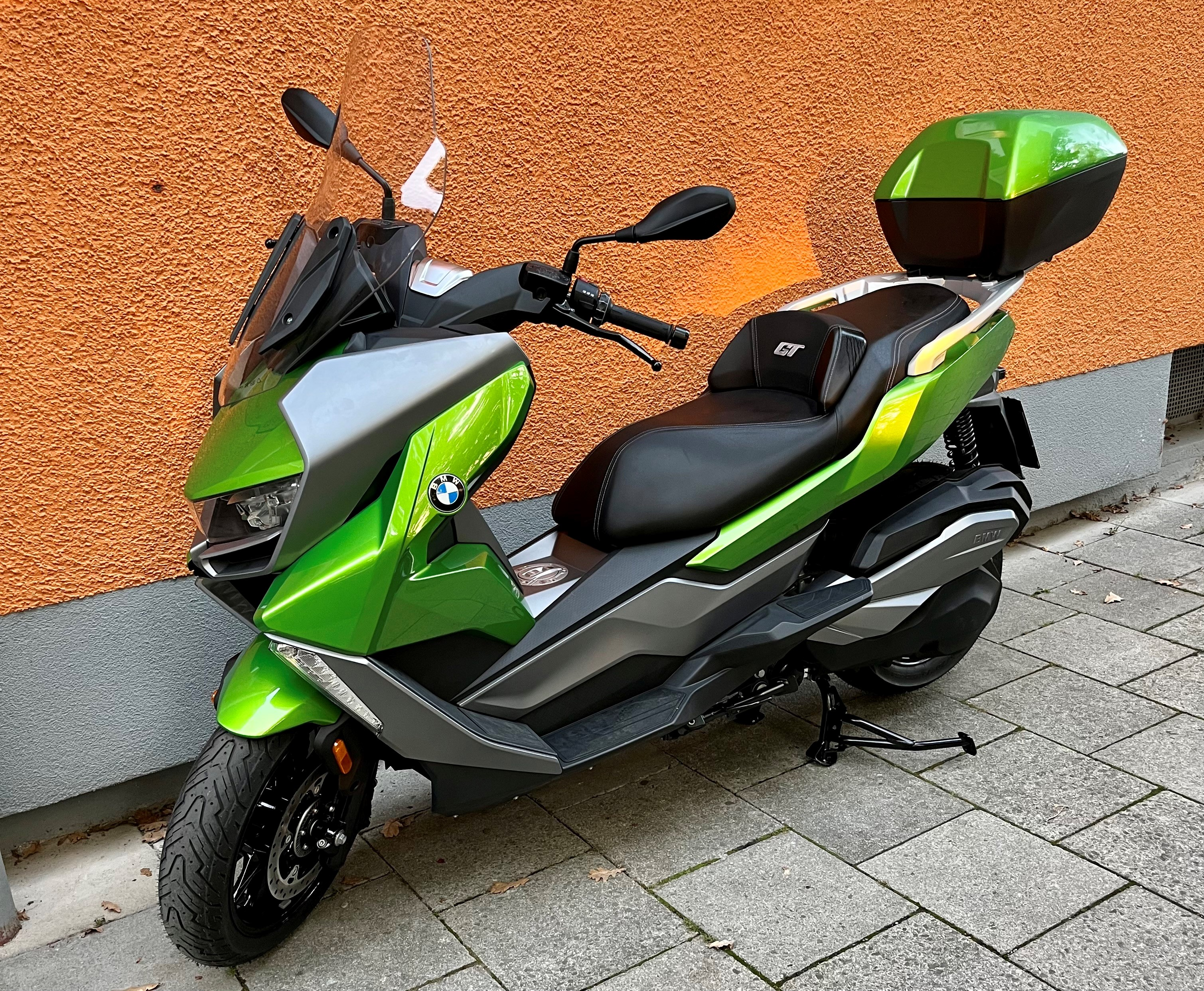
- BMW C400 GT
- Manufacturer: BMW Motorrad
- Parent company: BMW
- Production: 2018–present
- Class: Maxi-scooter
- Engine: 350 cc single-cylinder, 4-stroke, liquid-cooled
- Compression ratio: 12:1
- Top speed: 139 km/h (86 mph)
- Power: (34 hp)/7,500 rpm
- Torque: 35 Nm/5,750 rpm
- Ignition type: Electronic
- Fuel delivery: Electronic fuel injection
- Transmission: Continuously variable transmission (CVT)
- Frame type: Tubular steel
- Suspension: Telescopic fork (front); Double swing arm (rear)
- Brakes: Dual disc (front); Single disc (rear); ABS
- Tires: 120/70 R15 (front); 150/70 R14 (rear)
- Wheelbase: 1,565 mm
- Seat height: 775 mm
- Weight: 204 kg (C 400 X); 214 kg (C 400 GT) (wet)
- Fuel capacity: 12.8ℓ
- Fuel consumption: 3.5ℓ/100 km
- Range: 350 km
- Related: Kymco Downtown 350i

The BMW C400 is a line of mid-sized scooters produced by BMW Motorrad since 2018. It was introduced as BMW's first entry into the premium 350cc scooter segment. The series comprises two main versions: the C400 X, and the C400 GT, a "Gran Turismo" variant. Both share the same 350 cc single-cylinder engine and continuously variable transmission (CVT).

== Development ==
BMW announced the C 400 X at EICMA 2017 as a mid-size scooter to slot below the larger C 650 Sport and C 650 GT.

== Design and features ==
Both C 400 models are powered by a 350cc single-cylinder engine producing around 34 hp, along with a continuously variable transmission. Standard equipment includes anti-lock braking (ABS), automatic stability control (ASC), LED lighting, and under-seat storage.

== Market reception ==
Upon release, reviewers and owners of the scooter frequently praised its quality of construction and reliability. However, some criticism centered around its asking price, which tends to be higher than for similarly powered scooters such as the Yamaha XMAX 300 and Honda Forza 350.
