= BMW R1300GS =

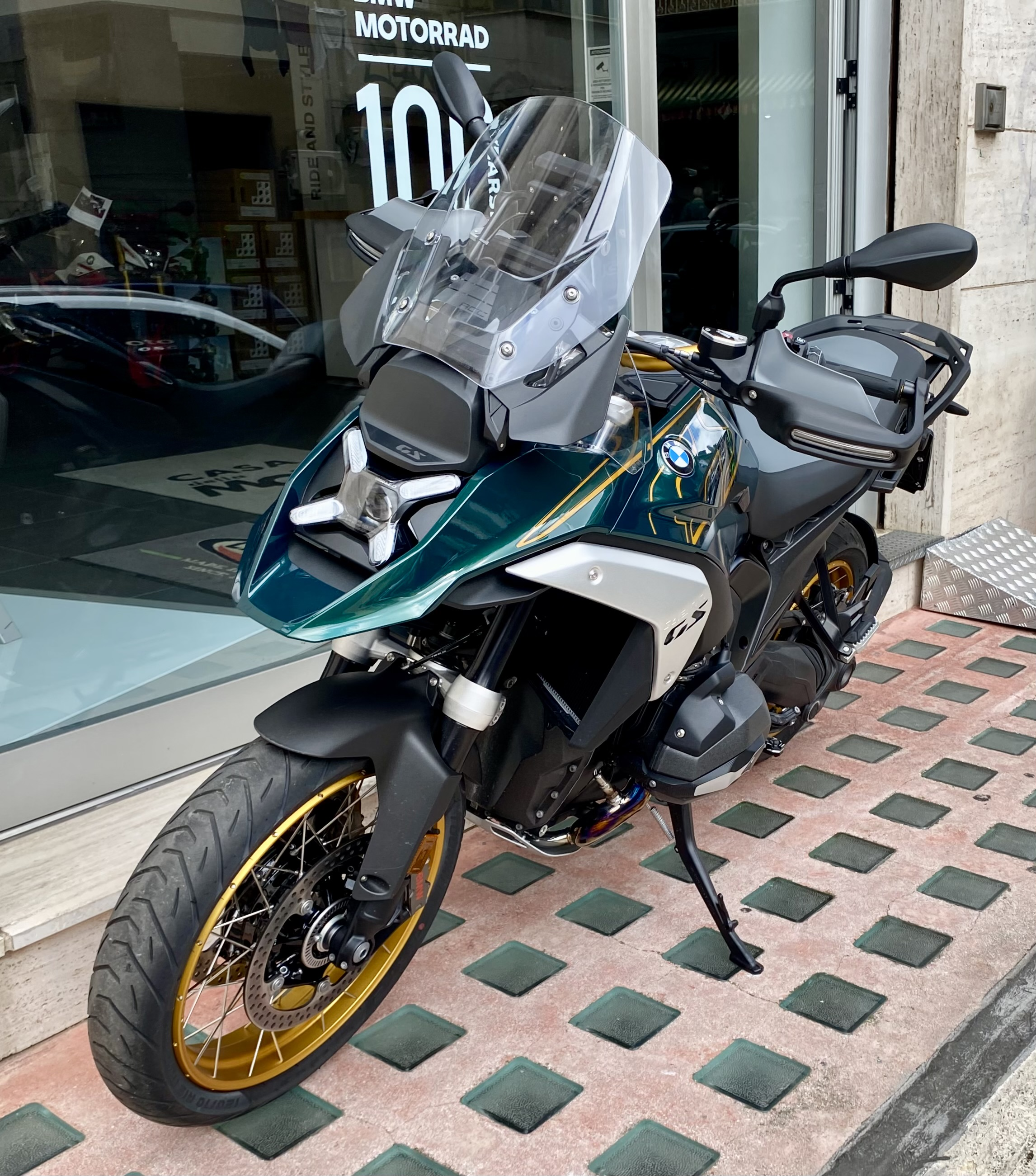
- Manufacturer: BMW
- Production: 2024–present
- Predecessor: BMW R1250GS
- Class: Adventure touring
- Engine: 1,300.6 cc (79.37 cu in) liquid cooled boxer twin with variable valve timing (VVT)
- Bore / stroke: 106.5 mm × 73 mm (4.19 in × 2.87 in)
- Compression ratio: 13.3:1
- Top speed: over 120 mph (190 km/h)
- Power: 145 hp (108 kW) @ 7,750 rpm
- Torque: 110 lb⋅ft (150 N⋅m) @ 6,500 rpm
- Transmission: 6-speed, shaft drive
- Suspension: Front: Evo Telelever; Rear: Evo Telelever; Optional electronic adjustment
- Brakes: Front: Twin floating 305 mm discs, 4-piston radial calipers; Rear: Single 276 mm disc, double piston floating caliper ABS
- Tires: Front: 120/70 R 19; Rear: 170/60 R 17
- Wheelbase: 59.8 in (1,520 mm)
- Dimensions: L: 87.1 in (2,210 mm); W: 39.4 in (1,000 mm); H: 55.4 in (1,410 mm)
- Seat height: 33.4 in (850 mm)
- Weight: 237 kg (522 lb) (wet)
- Fuel capacity: 19 L (4.2 imp gal; 5.0 US gal)

The BMW R1300GS is an adventure touring motorcycle announced for the 2024 model year by BMW Motorrad, following the BMW R1250GS. The engine and transmission were redesigned, as was the frame, eliminating the full trellis frame of the earlier model. Both changes contributed to a weight of 237 kg, 12 kg lighter than the previous model. It also eliminated the asymmetrical headlights in earlier generations of the GS series.

== Users ==
Oslo Police District began operating BMW R1300GS in their service summer 2024.
