= BMW R18 =

Cruiser motorcycle of BMW Motorrad

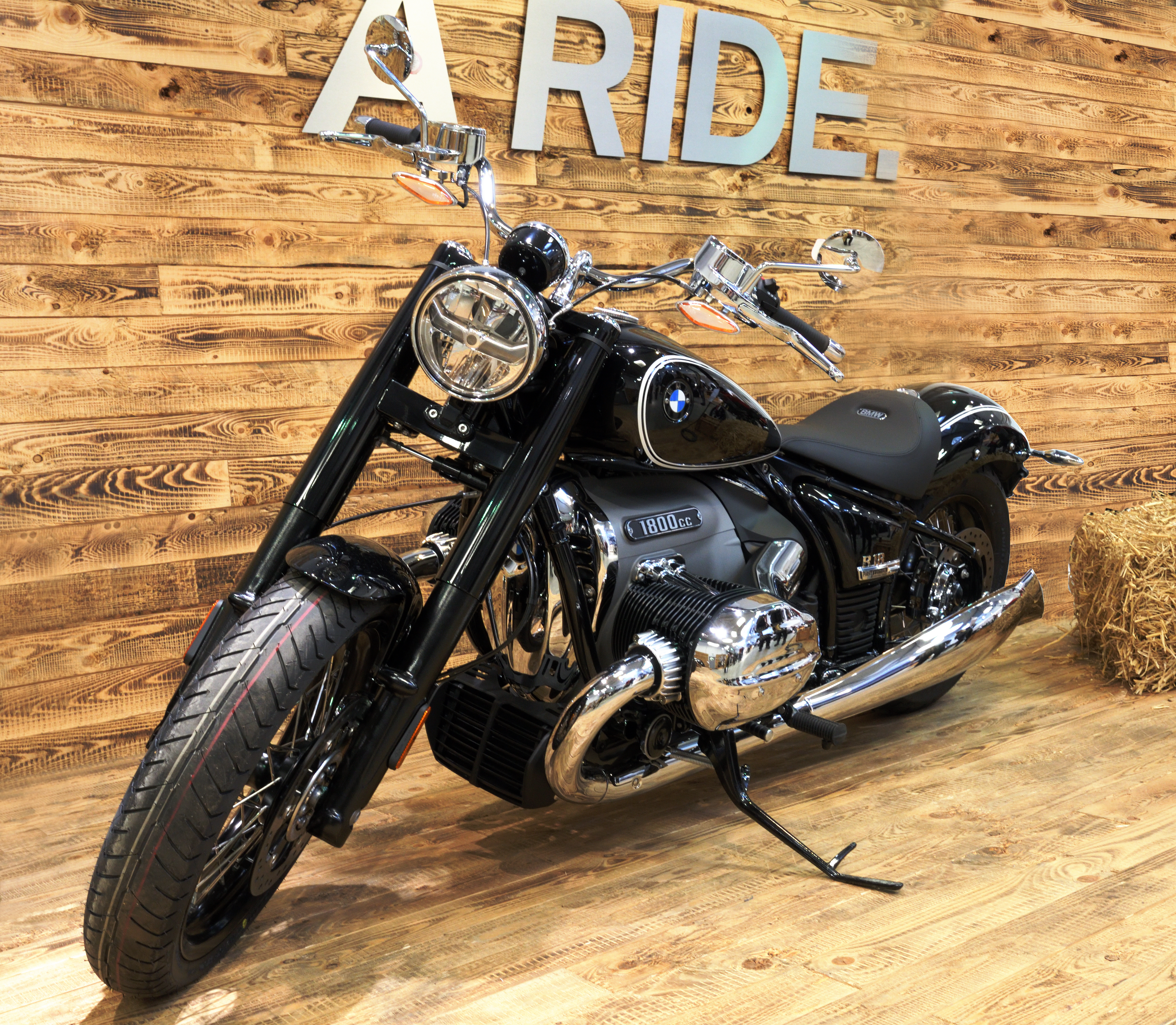
- BMW R18 First Edition
- Manufacturer: BMW Motorrad
- Parent company: BMW
- Production: 2020–present
- Class: Cruiser
- Engine: 1,802 cc (110.0 cu in) two-cylinder boxer
- Bore / stroke: 107.1 mm × 100 mm (4.22 in × 3.94 in)
- Compression ratio: 9.6 :1
- Top speed: over 179 km/h (111 mph)
- Power: 90 hp (67 kW) @ 4,750 rpm
- Torque: 158 N⋅m (117 lbf⋅ft) @ 3,000 rpm
- Transmission: Dry clutch, 6-speed, shaft drive
- Suspension: Front: telescopic fork, Rear: double swingarm with central shock strut
- Brakes: Dual disc front, single disc rear (ABS)
- Tires: Front: 120/70 R 19; Rear: 180/65 B 16
- Rake, trail: 150 mm (5.9 in)
- Wheelbase: 1,731 mm (68.1 in)
- Dimensions: L: 2,440 mm (96 in); W: 964 mm (38.0 in); H: 1,232 mm (48.5 in)
- Seat height: 690 mm (27 in)
- Weight: 345 kg (761 lb) (wet)
- Fuel capacity: 16 L (3.5 imp gal; 4.2 US gal)
- Fuel consumption: 5.6 L/100 km; 50 mpg_{‑imp} (42 mpg_{‑US})

The BMW R18 is a cruiser motorcycle manufactured by BMW Motorrad and was officially introduced in April 2020 and launched in September 2020 in Germany. Due to the COVID-19 pandemic, an official introduction at the BMW dealers was not possible, therefore it was presented virtually on the internet.

== Conception ==
BMW started development in 2015 and later, presented information on the forthcoming model's design and specifications. The design and visible technique is mainly based on the 1936 BMW R5. The R 18 is BMW's second attempt, after the BMW R1200C to tap into the market segment of heavy cruisers, currently dominated by Harley-Davidson, Indian, British Triumph Thunderbird or Triumph Rocket III, Moto Guzzi's Cruiser or Japanese Honda, Kawasaki, Suzuki and Yamaha. The R 18's conversion-friendly design will ease modifications for riders interested in the custom bike scene following a similar approach as the one taken with the BMW R nineT.

== Construction ==
The bike comes with a double-loop tubular steel frame, exposed propshaft and spoked wheels. The rear wheel is guided by a cantilever rear swingarm, whose bearings and spring/damper unit are concealed to give the impression of a rigid frame without rear suspension. Otherwise, modern technology such as a partially integral anti-lock braking system (cornering ABS), assistance systems, fuel injection and upside-down telescopic fork is installed. The motorcycle is powered by a newly developed air and oil-cooled 1,802 cc (110.0 cu in), 91 hp (68 kW) two-cylinder boxer. It is the largest two-cylinder boxer engine for motorcycles built by BMW so far. The valves of the four-stroke engine are controlled by tappets, push rods above the cylinders and rocker arms. In contrast to the design studies equipped with carburetors, the production model has an electronically controlled injection system with digital engine management and electronic throttle control. Exhaust gas purification is achieved by a three-way catalytic converter. The power output is 91 hp (68 kW) at 4,750 rpm and a maximum torque of 158 N⋅m (117 lbf⋅ft) at 3,000 rpm, whereby in the range 2,000–4,000 rpm there is always more than 150 N⋅m (110 lbf⋅ft).

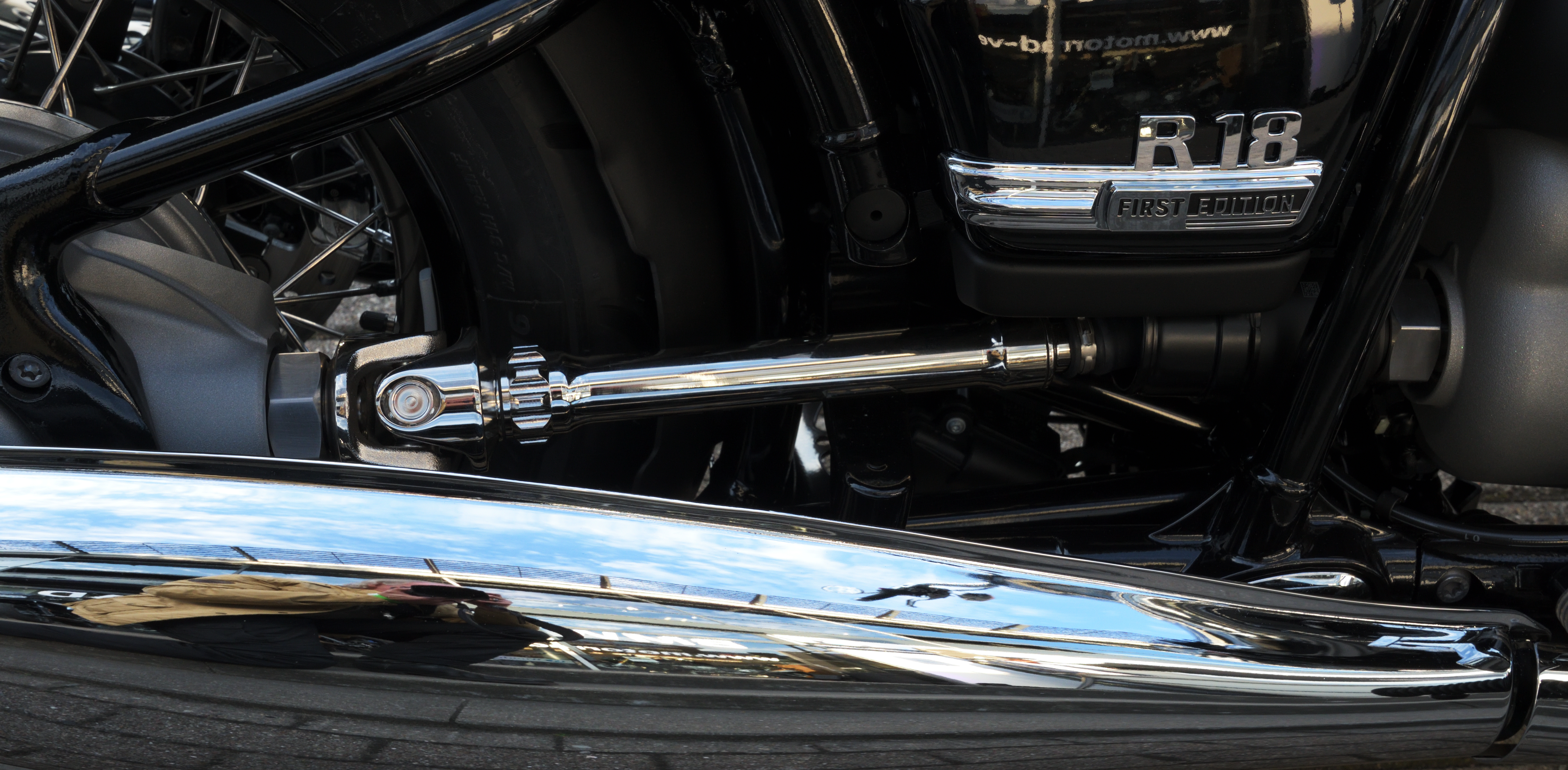
Exposed cardan shaft

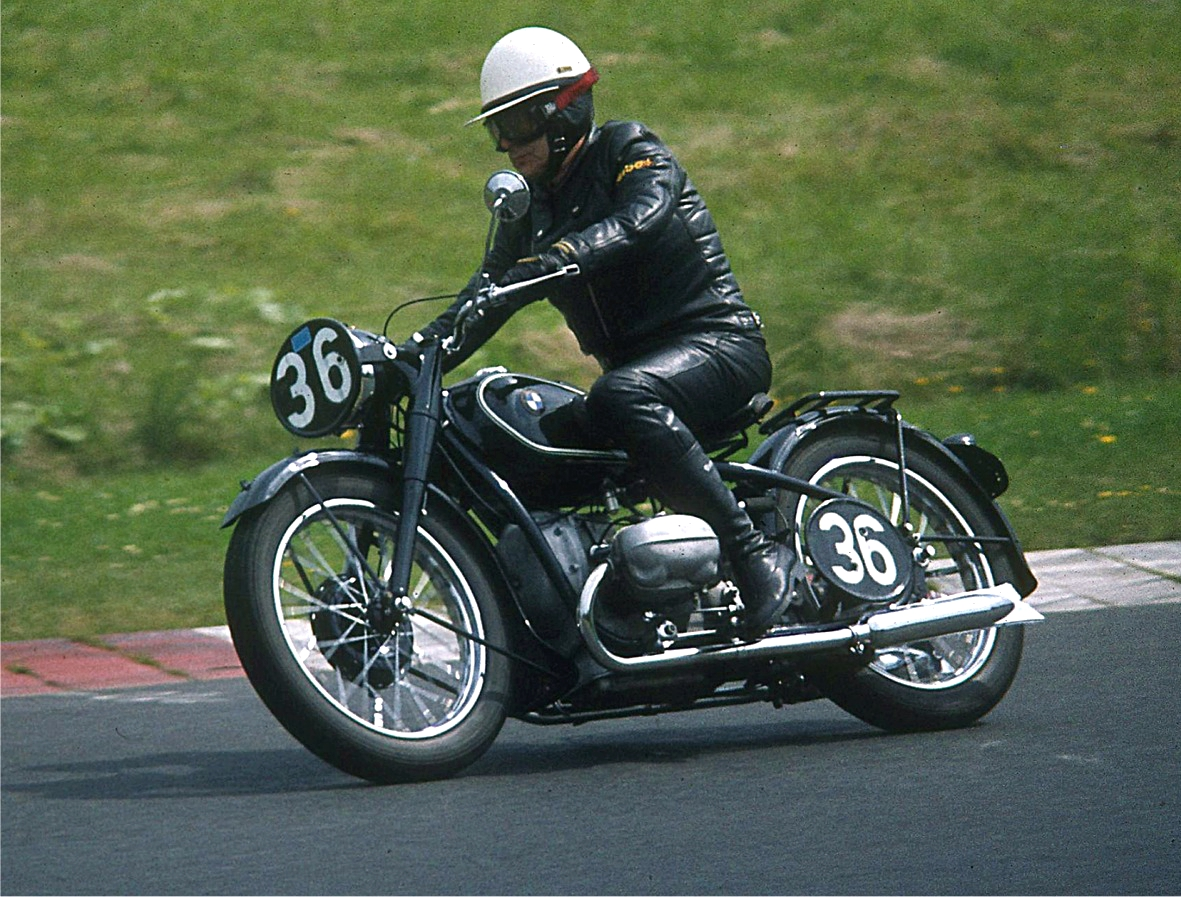
BMW R5 of 1936, the design template of the BMW R 18

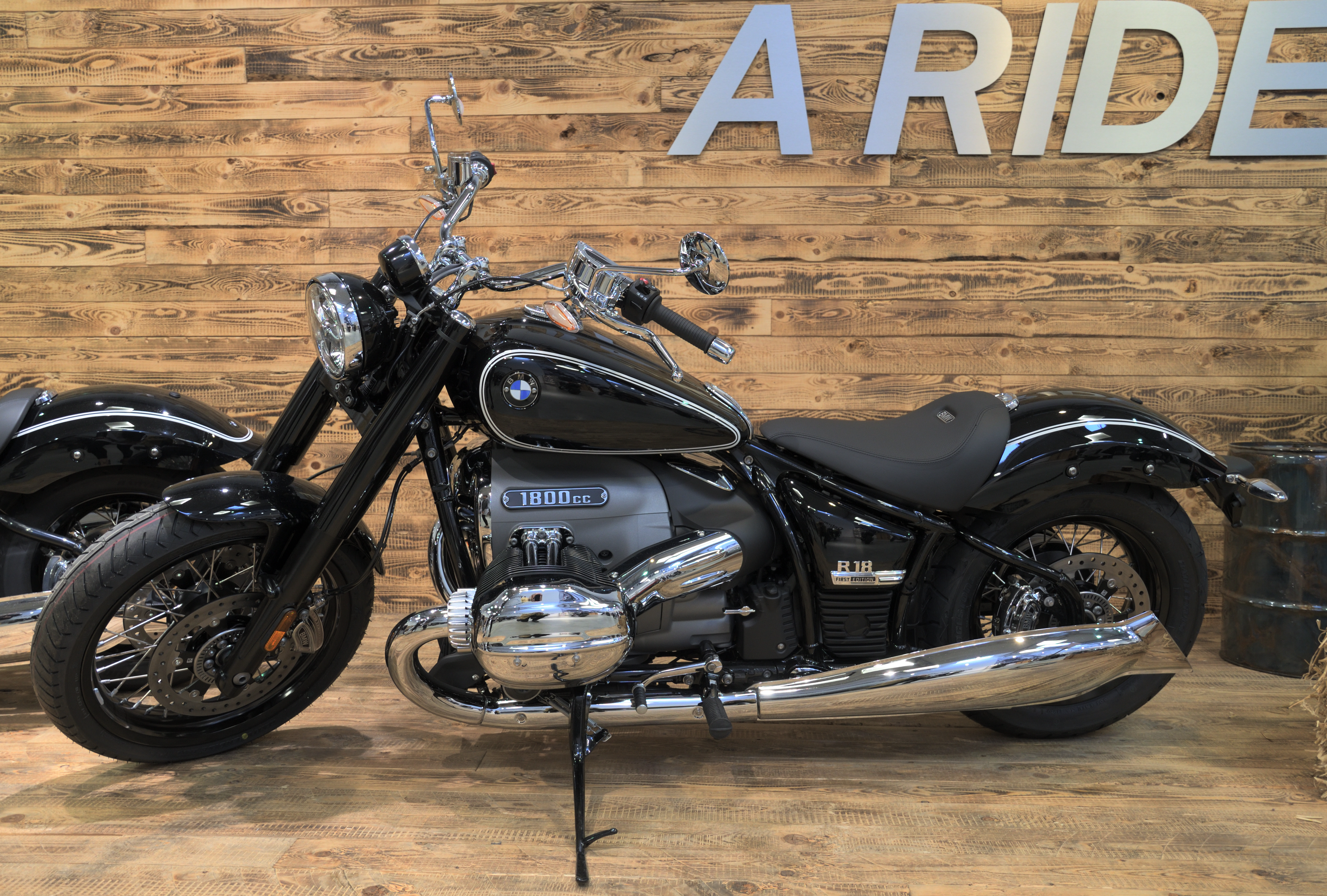

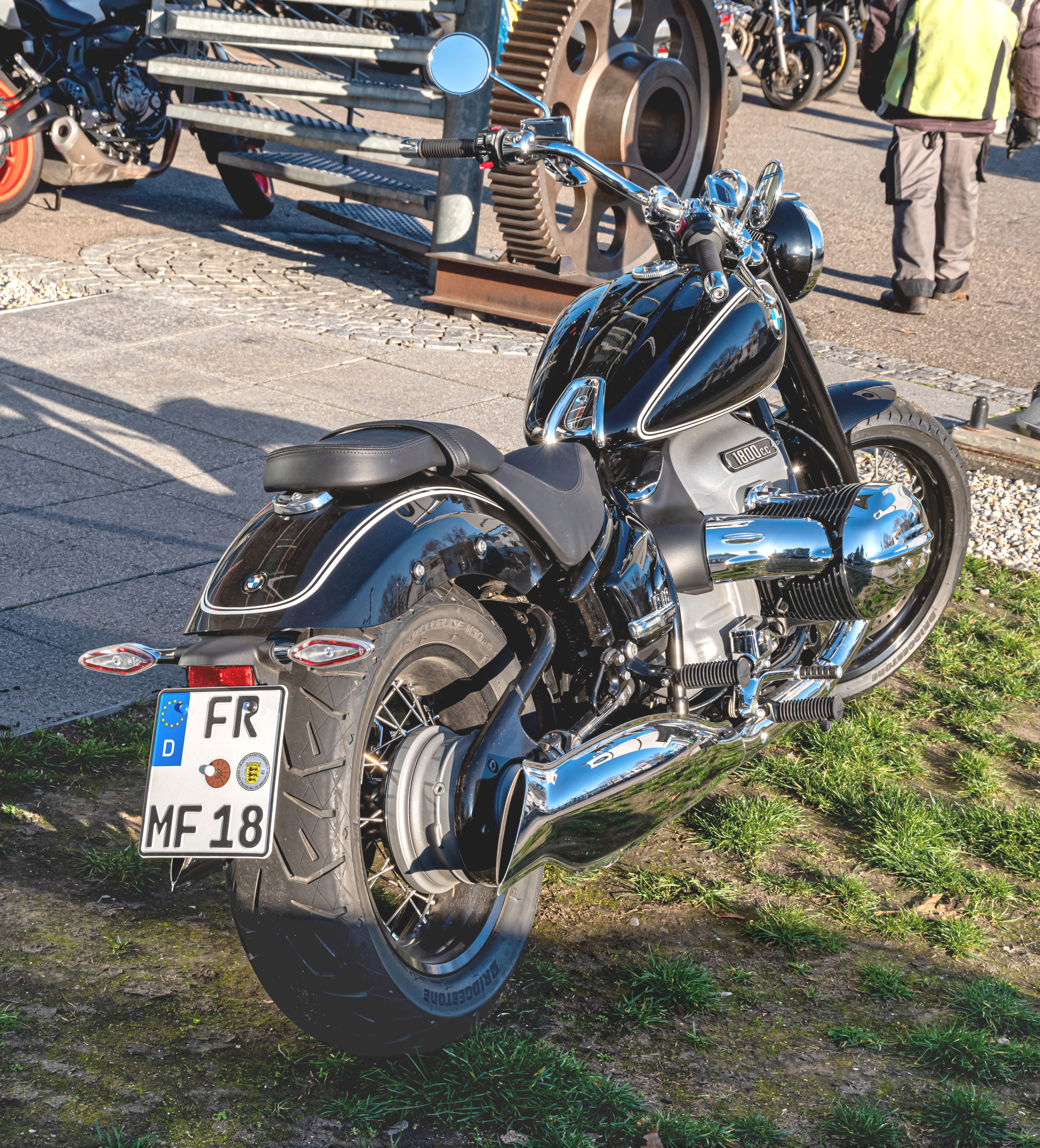
R18 from the rear

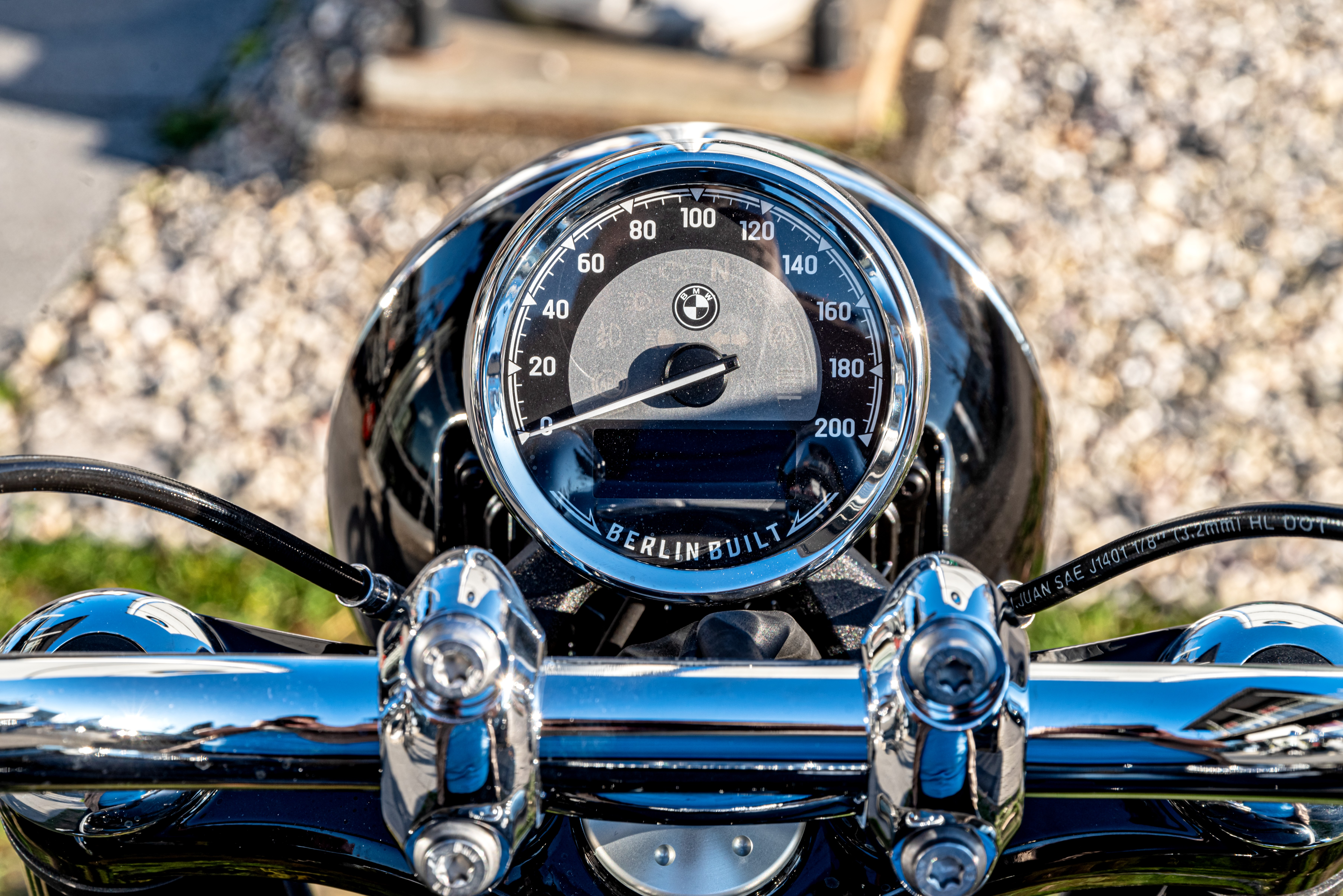
R 18, Speedometer

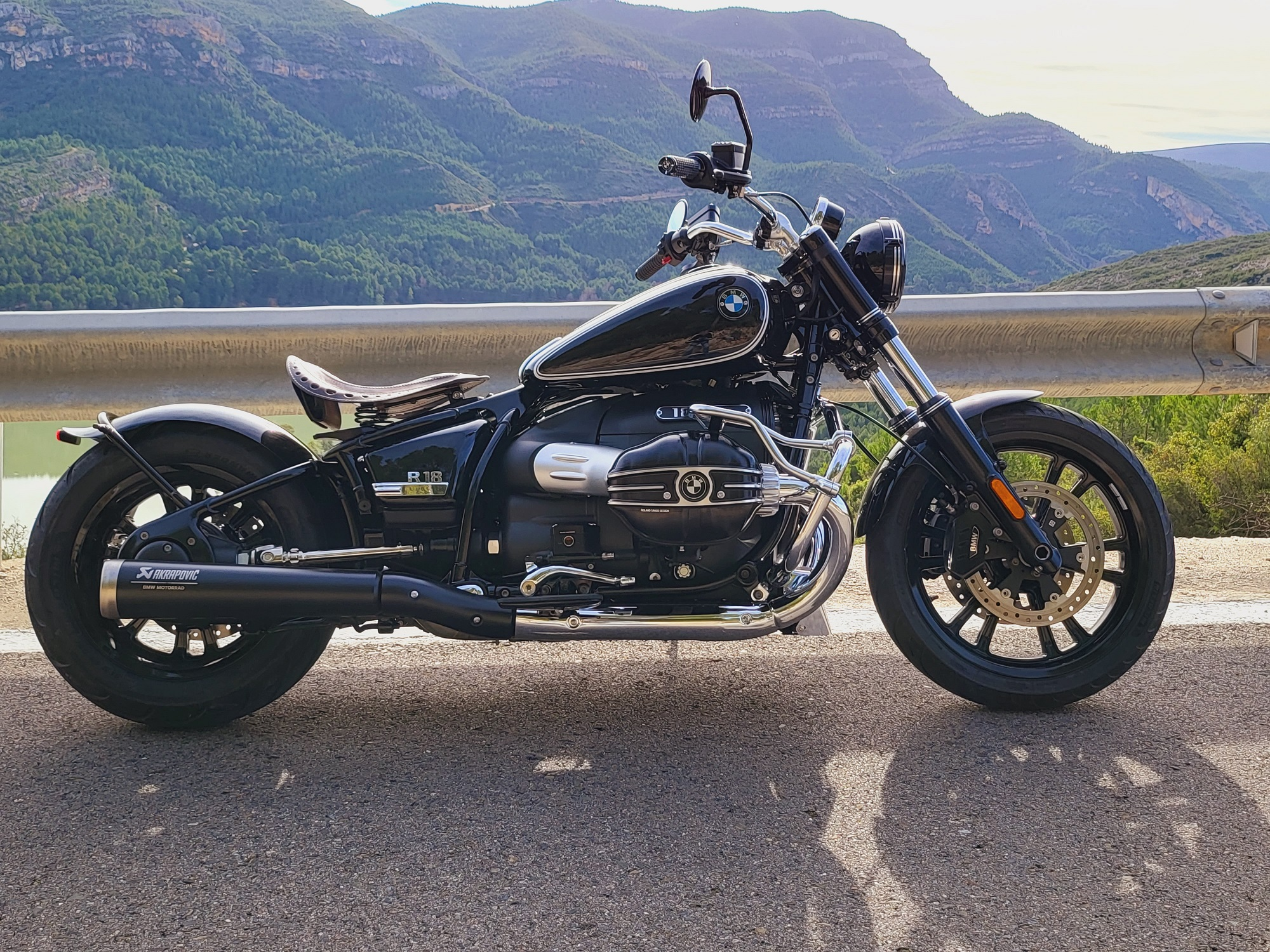
BMW R18 Bobber Kit
