= BMW R nineT =

Standard motorcycle

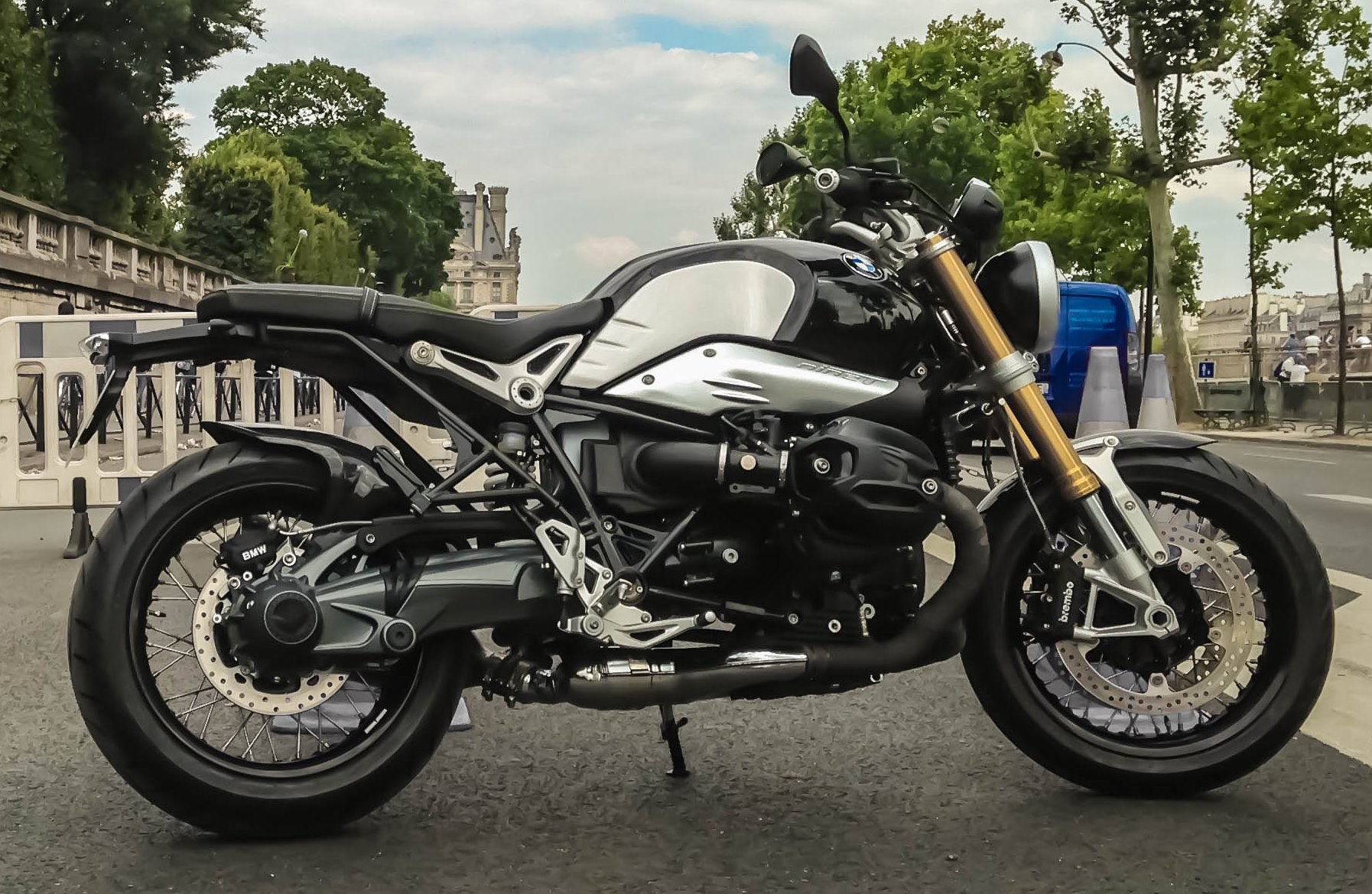
- Manufacturer: BMW Motorrad
- Parent company: BMW
- Production: 2014–2023
- Successor: BMW R 12 nineT
- Class: Standard
- Engine: 1,170 cc (71 cu in) air-cooled flat-twin
- Bore / stroke: 101 mm × 73 mm (4.0 in × 2.9 in)
- Power: 110 hp (82 kW) @ 7,610 rpm (rear wheel)
- Torque: 74.3 lb⋅ft (100.7 N⋅m) @ 6,090 rpm (rear wheel)
- Transmission: Dry clutch, 6-speed sequential manual transmission, shaft-drive
- Suspension: Front: telescopic fork, Rear: Paralever
- Brakes: Disc
- Tires: Front: 120/70 ZR 17; Rear: 180/55 ZR 17
- Rake, trail: 25.5°, 102.5 mm (4.04 in)
- Wheelbase: 1,476 mm (58.1 in)
- Dimensions: L: 2,220 mm (87 in); W: 890 mm (35 in); H: 1,266 mm (49.8 in) (w/o mirrors)
- Seat height: 780 mm (30.9 in)
- Fuel capacity: 18 L; 4.0 imp gal (4.8 US gal)

The BMW R nineT is a standard motorcycle made by BMW Motorrad since 2014. It is a retro styled roadster marketed by BMW to custom builders and enthusiasts as a "blank canvas for customizing".

All models have anti-lock braking systems (ABS). Automatic stability control (ASC) was available as an option until 2020, when it became standard equipment.

In 2024 the R nineT was replaced in BMW's model range by the R12 and R12 nineT which have substantially the same engine.

== Design elements ==
The BMW R nineT has several design elements configured to allow the bike to be easily modified, such as separate engine and chassis wiring harnesses and minimal bolts attaching the rear subframe, tail lights, and headlight.

The R nineT version of the bike has upside-down (USD) telescopic forks rather than BMW's usual Telelever front suspension. The other versions have conventional telescopic forks.

All variations have an air/oil-cooled oilhead flat twin (or boxer) 1,170 cc (71 cu in) engine, which has the inlet manifold at the rear of the cylinders and the exhaust at the front.

As of 2017 there are five R nineT variations:

- R nineT - with upside-down (USD) telescopic forks
- R nineT Pure - styled back roadster design
- R nineT Urban G/S - similar look and style to the BMW R80G/S with a 19-inch instead of 17-inch front wheel
- R nineT Racer S - a cafe racer without a passenger seat, with a nose fairing in blue, white and red trim
- R nineT Sport - UK-only version with Akrapovič silencer and cafe racer styling
- R nineT Scrambler - design features of the scrambler era with large 19-inch front wheel

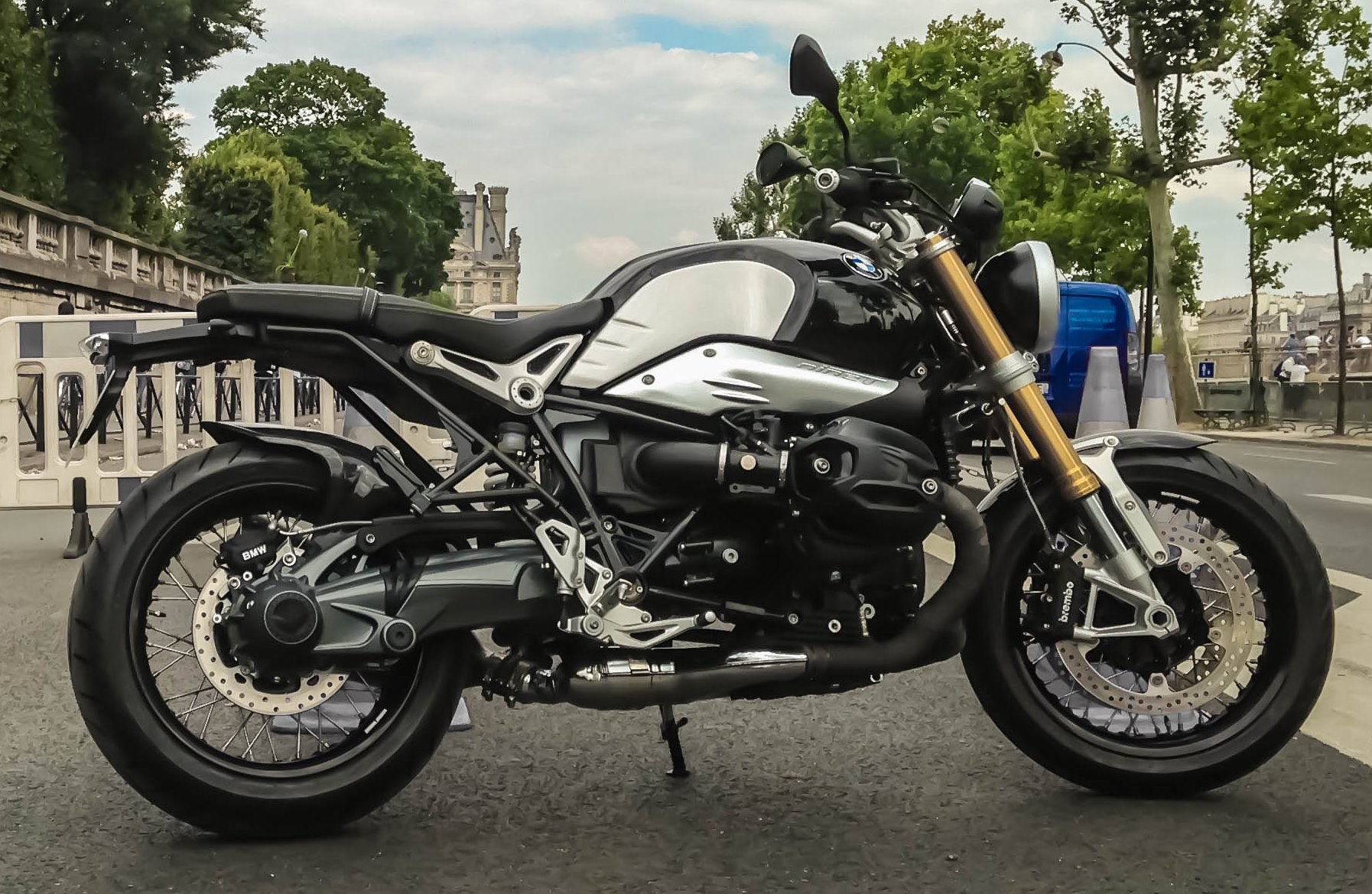
BMW R nineT in Paris

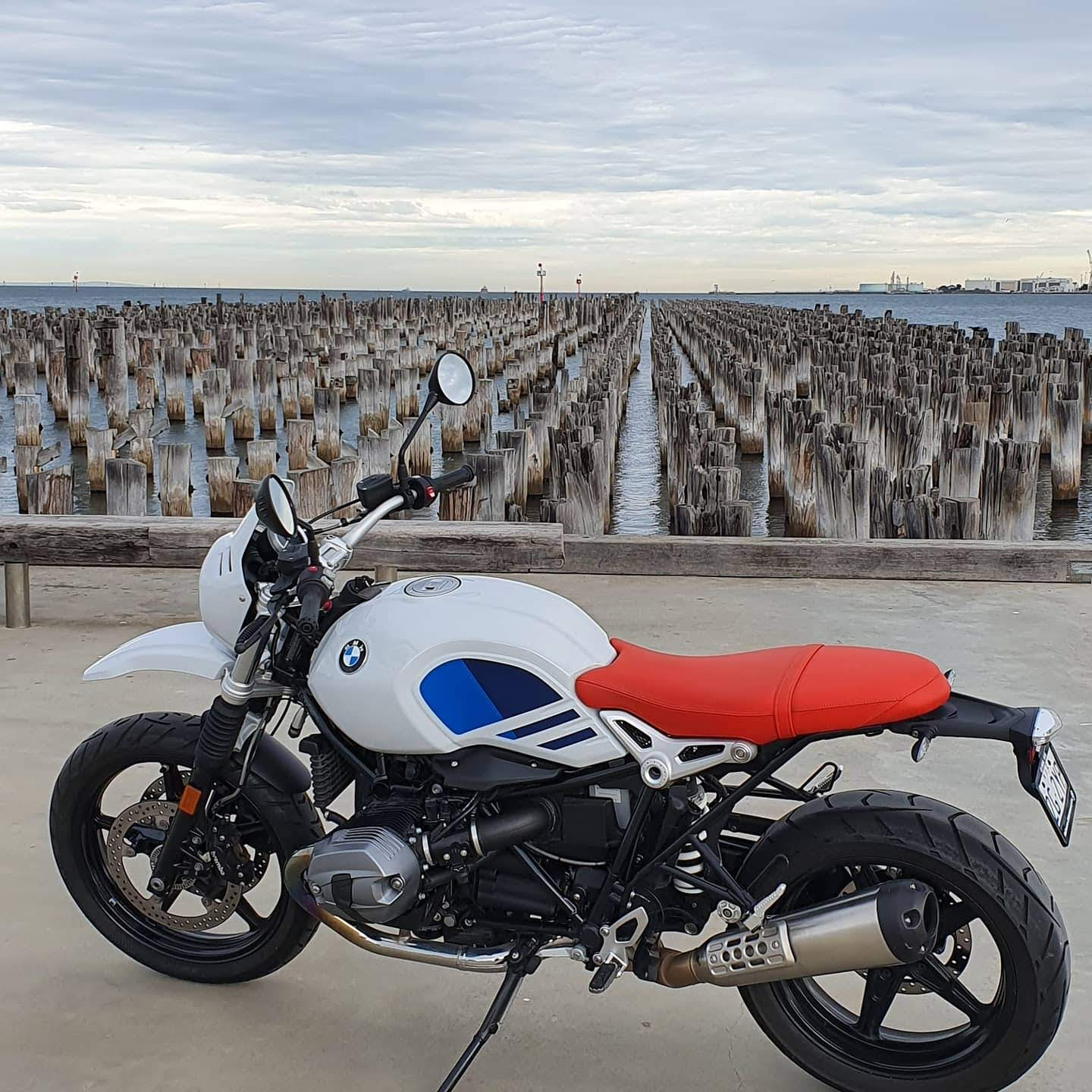
BMW R Nine T Urban GS 2018 model

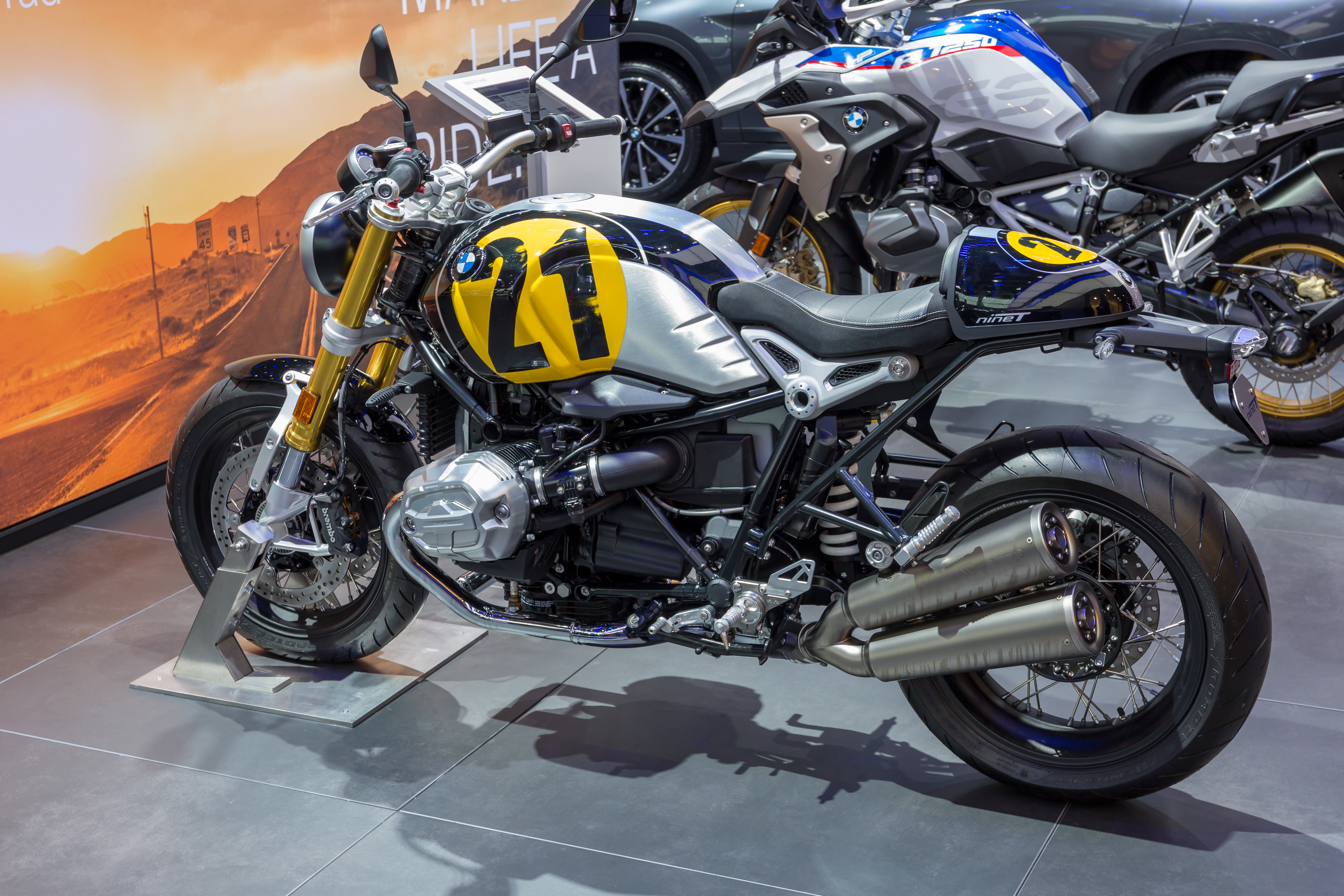
R nine T special at Paris Motor Show 2018

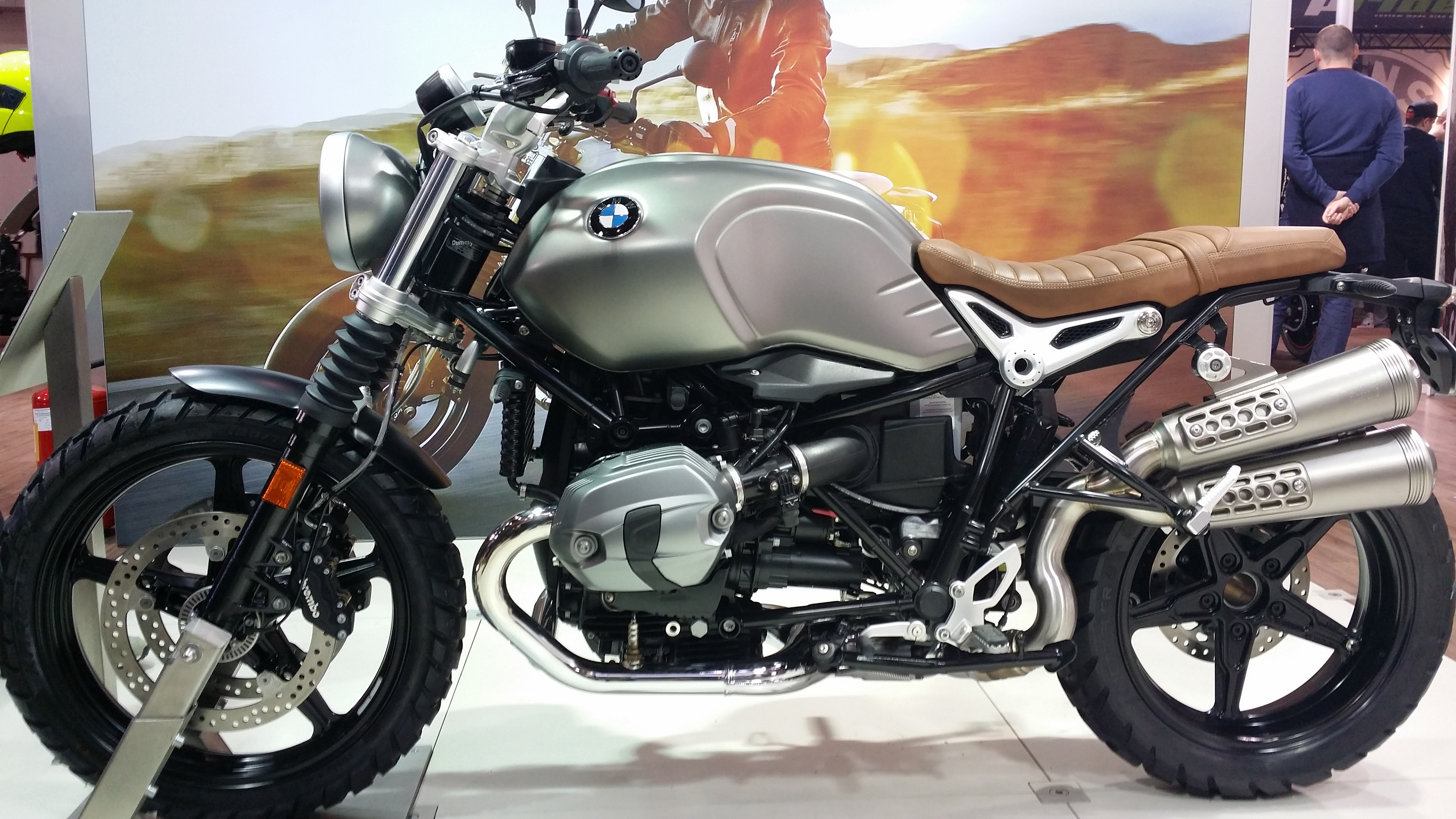
BMW R nineT Scrambler

== Reception ==
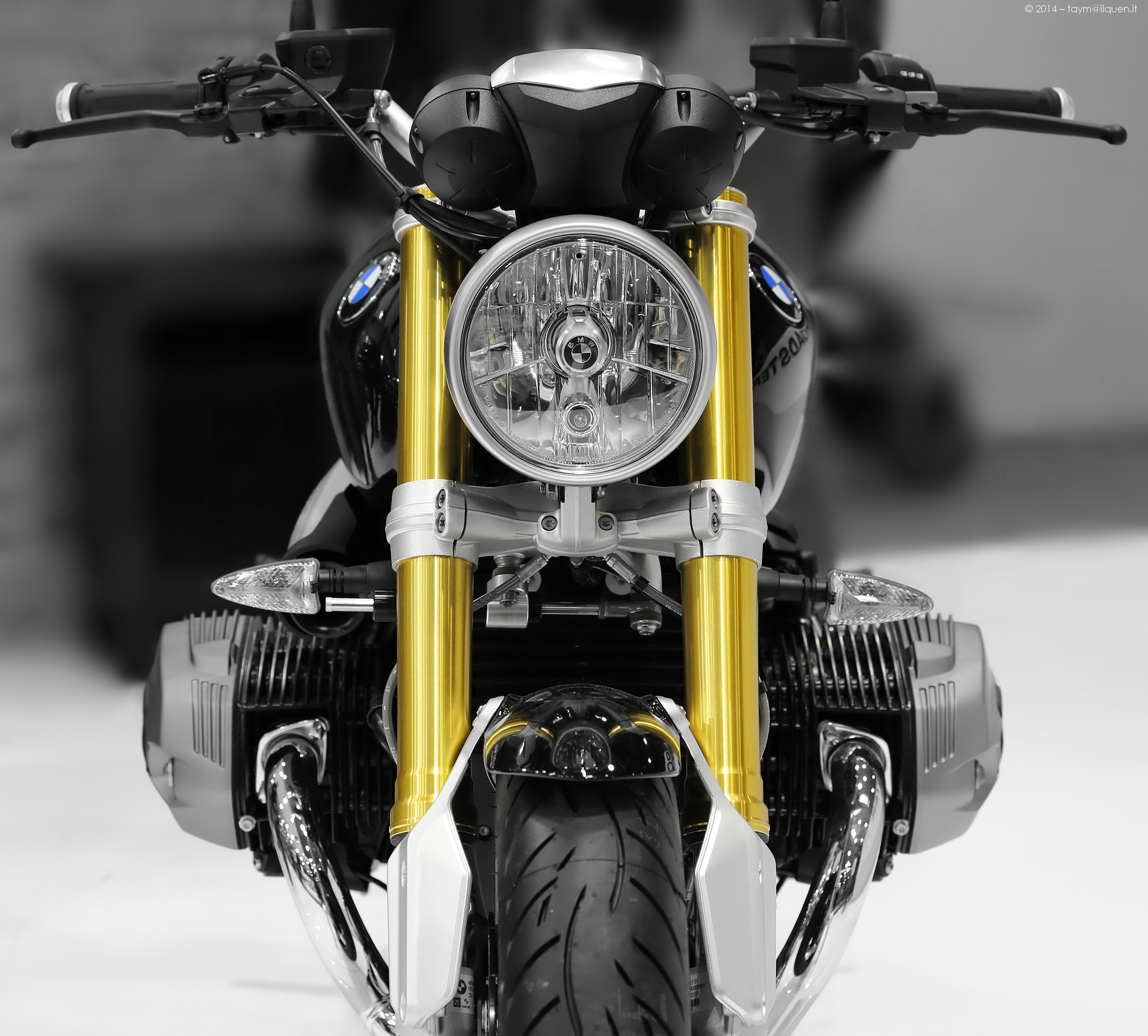
Horizontally-opposed twin cylinder heads

In a The Daily Telegraph review, Roland Brown said the R nineT is "not the bike for impecunious custom builders, but a retro roadster that combines heritage, good looks, high quality finish and entertaining performance in one cleverly integrated package, with potential for easy personalisation".

A Motor Cycle News review says of the R nineT: "The build quality is superb and the attention to detail impeccable. It goes, stops and handles as well as the best roadsters out there, thanks to its modern chassis, suspension and braking components. But there’s a lovely twist with the old-school air-cooled Boxer engine".
