= BMW Motorrad =

Motorcycle brand of BMW

- Product type: Motorcycle
- Current owner: BMW
- Country: Germany
- Introduced: 1923
- Markets: Worldwide
- Ambassadors: Markus Flasch (CEO); Alexander Buckan (head of BMW Motorrad design)
- Website: bmw-motorrad.com

BMW Motorrad is the motorcycle brand and division of German automotive manufacturer, BMW. It has produced motorcycles since 1923, and achieved record sales for the fifth year in succession in 2015. With a total of 136,963 vehicles sold in 2015, BMW registered a growth of 10.9% in sales in comparison with 2014. In May 2011, the 2,000,000th motorcycle produced by BMW Motorrad was an R1200GS.

== History ==
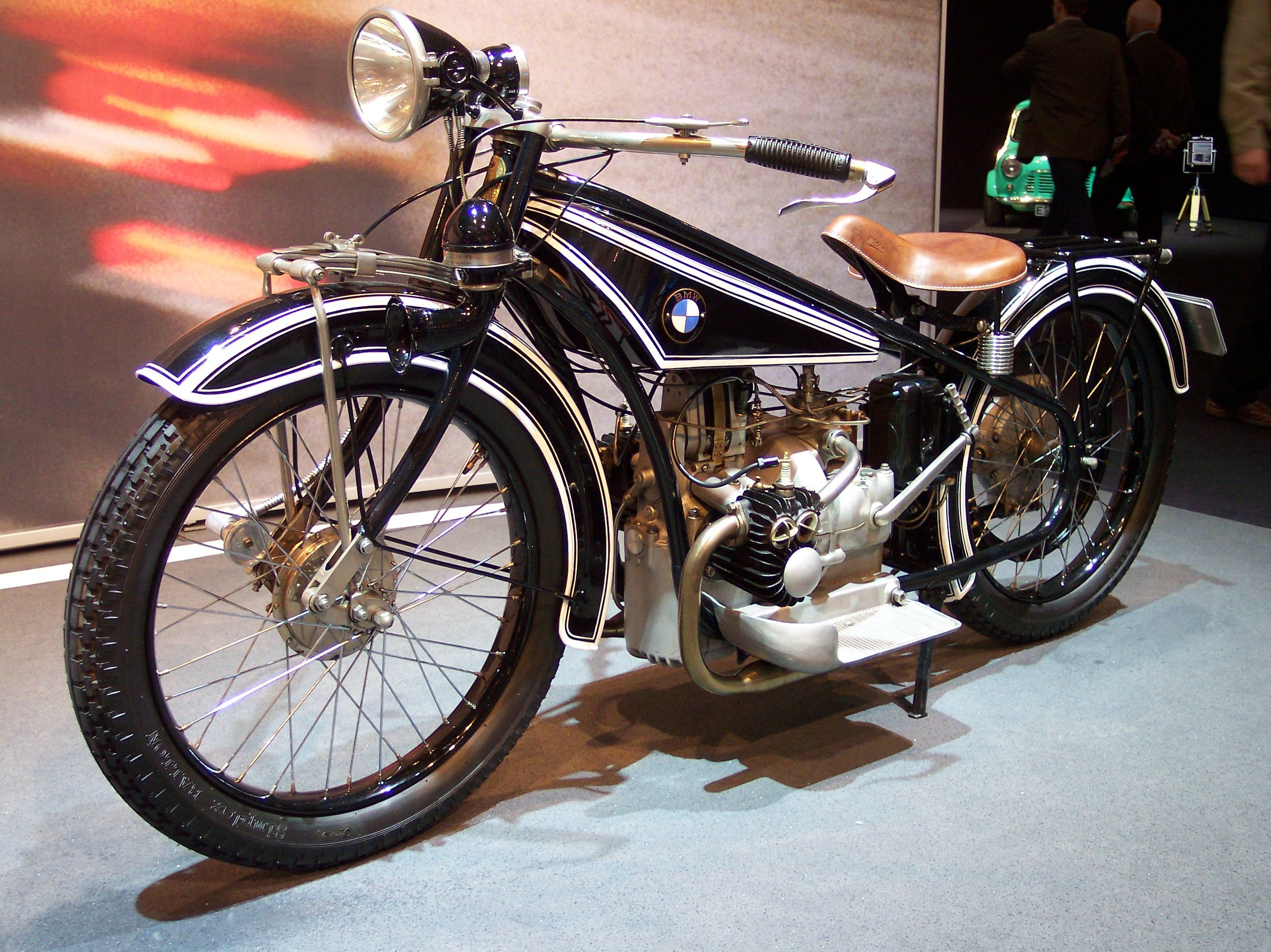
BMW's first motorcycle, the R32

The company began as an aircraft engine manufacturer in the early 20th century and through World War I. BMW manufactured its first motorcycle in 1923, the R32, which featured a flat-twin boxer engine. BMW Motorrad still uses the flat-twin boxer configuration, but now manufactures motorcycles with a variety of engine configurations.

== Current production ==
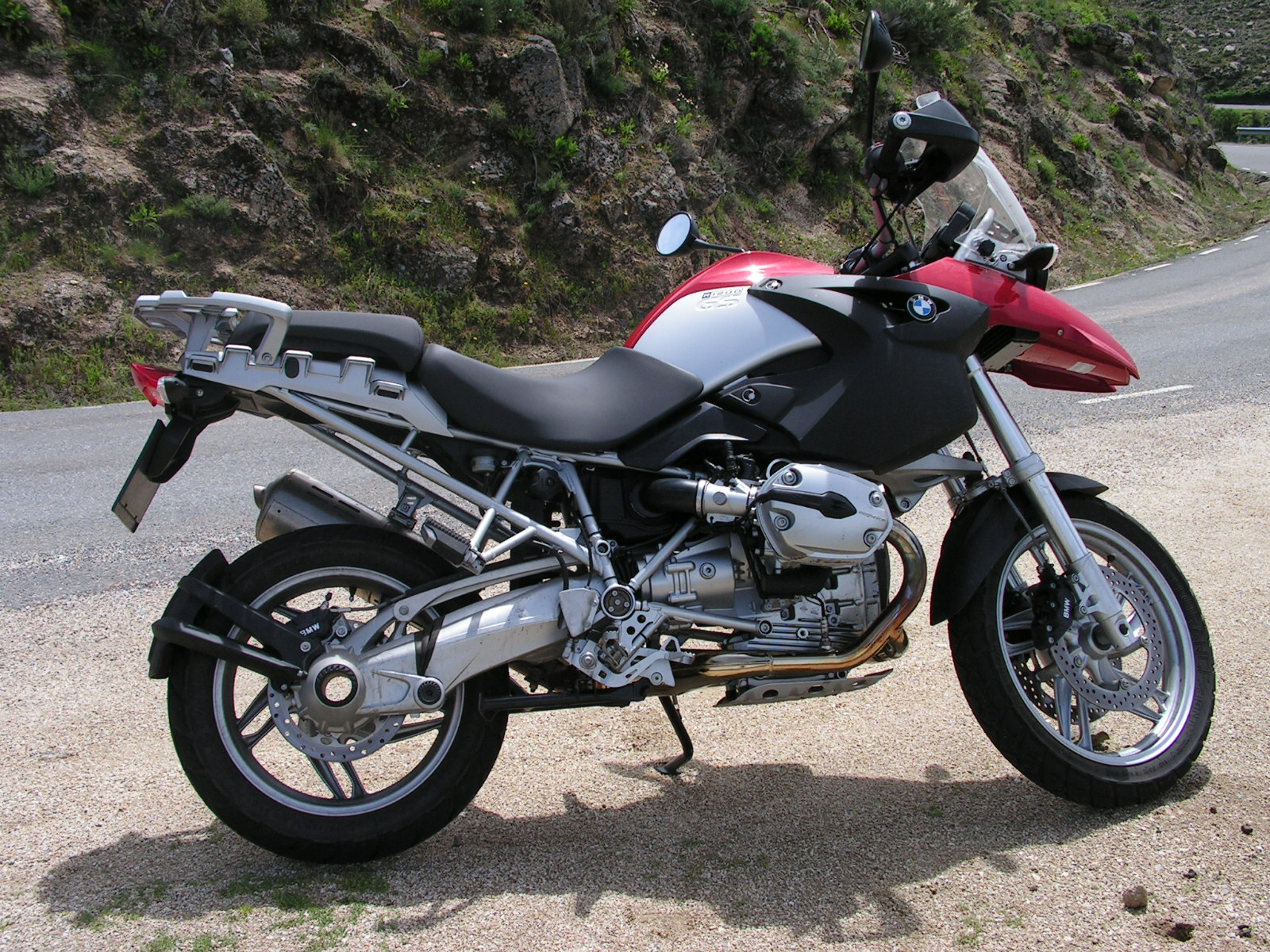
BMW's best selling motorcycle, the R1200GS

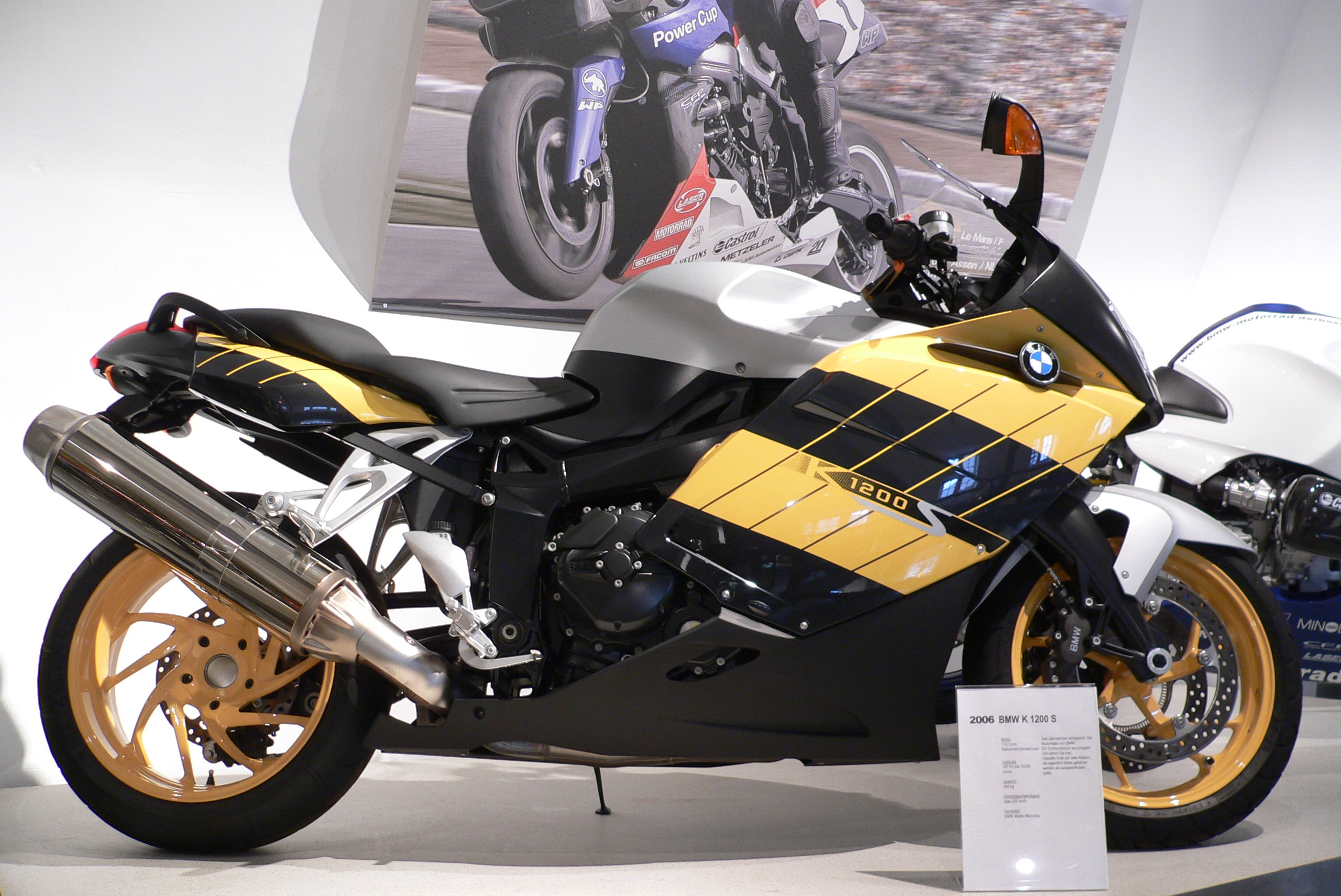
BMW K1200S

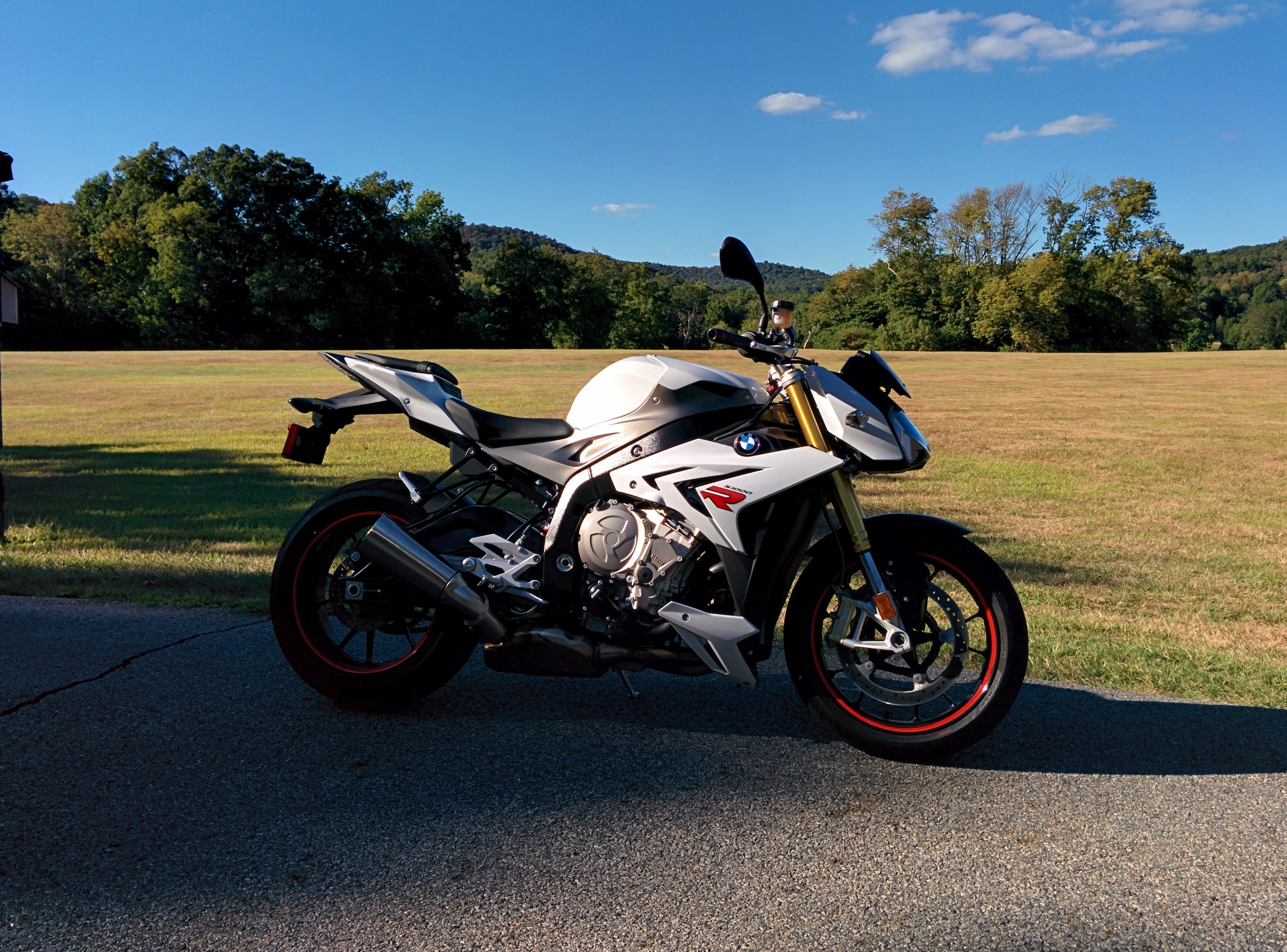
2014 BMW S1000R

Most BMW Motorrad's motorcycle production takes place at its plant in Berlin, Germany. The G 310 and F 450 series are produced at TVS' plant in Hosur, Tamil Nadu, India, the C 400 series is produced at Loncin's plant in Chongqing, China, while the plants in Manaus, Brazil and Rayong, Thailand produce a variety of models for the local markets. Some engines are manufactured in Austria, China, and Taiwan. Most of the current motorcycles in BMW Motorrad's range were designed by David Robb, who was the company's chief designer from 1993 to 2012 when he was replaced by Edgar Heinrich.

The most popular model is the R1300GS and its sibling R1300GS Adventure. Current production includes a variety of shaft and chain driven models, with engines from 310 cc to 1,802 cc; and models designed for off-road, dual-purpose, sport, and touring activities.

In 2008, BMW introduced the DOHC Boxer HP2 Sport, and entered the serious off-road competition motorcycle market with the release of the BMW G450X motorcycle.

BMW Motorrad motorcycles are categorized into product families, and each family is assigned a different letter prefix. The current families are:

- C series – maxi-scooters called Urban Mobility Vehicles by BMW. Models are CE04, CE02, C400GT, C400X and C650.
- F series – parallel-twin engines of 420-895 cc capacity featuring chain drive. Models are F450GS, F750GS, F800GS, F900GS Adventure, F850GS, F850GS Adventure, F900R, F900GS, F900XR.
- G series – single-cylinder engine of 313 cc capacity featuring chain drive. Models are G310R, G310GS, and G310RR, all manufactured in India by TVS Motor Company.
- R series – primarily twin-cylinder boxer engines of 1,254 cc and 1,300 cc capacity featuring liquid cooling and shaft drive. The models are R1300GS, R1300GS Adventure, R1300R, R1300RS, R1300RT. This family also includes the R12, R12 NineT, R12S, and R12G/S, which use the previous generation air and oil-cooled boxer engine, and the R18, which uses a newly designed air and oil-cooled 1,802 cc boxer engine.
- K series – straight-six engine of 1,649 cc capacity featuring shaft drive. The models are K1600B, K1600 Grand America, K1600GT, and K1600GTL.
- S series – performance-oriented inline-four engine of 999 cc capacity featuring chain drive. The models are S1000RR, S1000R, and S1000XR.

== Sales ==
BMW Motorrad achieved record sales for the fifth time in succession in 2015. With a total of 136,963 vehicles sold in 2015, BMW registered a 10.9% increase in sales in comparison with 2014. The biggest single market in 2015 was once again Germany (23,823 units), followed by the United States (16,501 units), France (12,550 units), Italy (11,150 units), United Kingdom (8,200 units) and Spain (7,976 units).

With an aim for 2020 to supply 200,000 vehicles to customers, BMW Motorrad is targeting an increase of its dealership from around 1,100 to 1,500 in the future. As it was the case until now, BMW's most successful motorcycle is still the R 1200 GS with 23,681 units sold in 2015.

== Motorsports ==
BMW have a long history in motorsports with many successes in a wide range of disciplines including Isle of Man TT, Dakar Rally, and Superbikes.

== Engine types ==
There are 7 lines of BMW motorcycles:

- CE series electric scooters
- C series 350cc single cylinder scooters
- G series 313cc single cylinder bikes
- F series parallel twin bikes
- R series boxer twin bikes
- K series inline 6 touring bikes
- S series inline 4 bikes

The series differ primarily in the class of engine that each uses.

=== F and G series singles ===
The F Series of single-cylinder BMW motorcycles was first launched in 1994, as the F650, and was built by Aprilia around a carbureted 650 cc four-stroke, four-valve, single-piston engine, and chain drive. The mission for the F 650 was to provide an entry-level BMW motorcycle. In 2000, the F650 was redesigned, now with fuel injection, and labeled the

. An off-road focused F650 Dakar model was also launched that year. 2002 saw the addition of the F650CS 'Scarver' motorcycle to the line up. The Scarver was different from the F650GS variants in that it utilized a belt drive system opposed to a chain, had a much lower seat height, and was intended for on-road use. All F650 motorcycles produced from 2000 to 2007 used a 652 cc engine built in Austria by Rotax and were built by BMW in Berlin.

In late 2006, the G series of offroad biased bikes motorcycles was launched using the same 652 cc engine fitted to the F650GS, although that engine is no longer manufactured by Rotax. The latest version of the 652 cc single engine fitted in the new G650GS is now produced in Berlin after 2 years production in Loncin, China.

In November 2007, the G450X sport enduro motorcycle was launched using a 450 cc single-cylinder engine. The G450X contained several technological improvements over the Japanese off-road racing motorcycles but the most unusual and significant was the use of a single pivot point for the drive sprocket and the swing arm. This unusual configuration allowed for a very tense drive chain with no slop and eliminated acceleration squat. The former benefit saves on chain and sprocket wear and the latter allows for a more consistent drive geometry and fully available rear suspension travel during heavy acceleration.

=== F series twins ===
In mid-2006, The F Series added two new motorcycles to the lineup, the F800S sports bike and F800ST sports tourer, both which use a 798 cc parallel-twin engine built by Rotax. Both motorcycles also feature a belt drive system similar to what was in use on the F650CS. In 2007 the single-cylinder F650GS was replaced with the twin-cylinder F800GS and F650GS models. The latter uses a de-tuned version of the 798 cc engine fitted to the F800GS, marking a departure from BMW's naming convention.

=== R series flat-twins ===
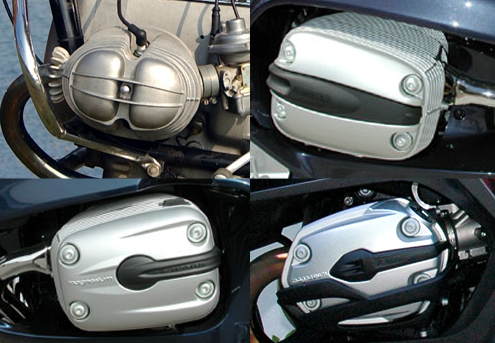
Four different BMW airhead and oilhead valve covers

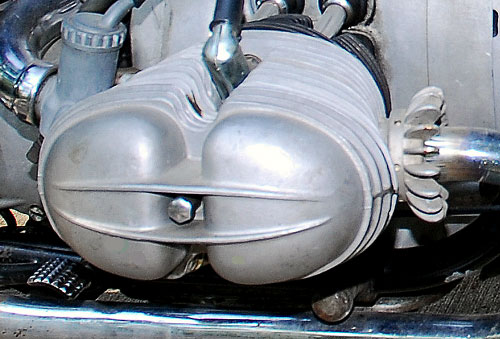
1954 R68's two-fin valve cover

The R series are built around a horizontally opposed flat-twin (boxer) engine. As the engine is mounted with a longitudinal crankshaft, the cylinder heads protrude well beyond the sides of the frame. Originally, R series bikes had air-cooled heads but are now produced only with partial oil cooling or water cooling. The type of internal combustion engine cooling used across the various R series engines leads to the use of the distinguishing names airhead and oilhead.

==== Airheads ====
Airheads are BMW motorcycles with an air-cooled vertical-single or horizontally opposed twin engine that were built from 1923 to 1995. Most airheads made from 1969 to 1995 used the BMW 247 engine, although 248/1 engines were used on mid-sized R-series motorcycles from 1978 to 1993. Even high-performance motorcycles, such as the R90S used the 247 engine; and its successor, the R100RS, was fitted with an oil cooler.

==== Oilheads ====
An "Oilhead" is a name to describe BMW flat-twin motorcycle engines with partial oil-cooling, and to distinguish these engines from the earlier air-cooled "Airhead" models. The Oilhead's finned cylinders have conventional air-cooling, but the four-valve cylinder-heads are oil-cooled. Unlike earlier BMW boxers which had a single camshaft in the crankcase (variously above or below the crankshaft), the Oilhead has a camshaft in each head. (It is still technically an overhead valve engine rather than a true overhead camshaft unit, as the camshaft bears onto very short pushrods which operate valve rockers). In 2013, BMW introduced water-cooling to its boxer range. The engine is still used in the BMW R nineT line of motorcycles.

In April 2020 BMW launched its cruiser BMW R18 with BMW's largest boxer engine featuring 1,802 cc (110.0 cu in), 90 hp (67 kW) and 158 N⋅m (117 lbf⋅ft).

==== Water-cooled boxer engines ====
From 2013 (R1200GS), some BMW bikes have water-cooled heads, but (like the oilheads), the new engines still use air-cooling for the cylinders. Approximately 34% of the cooling is attributed to the water-cooling which is concentrated in the highest heat-generating areas such as around the exhaust-valve seats, etc.

The inlets are now on top of the cylinder (not behind as before) and the exhausts are below (no longer in front).

=== R series singles ===
Between the introduction of the R39 in 1925 and the discontinuation of the R27 in 1967, BMW made motorcycles with single-cylinder engines. These were similar in design to their larger flat-twin motorcycles, including the use of shaft drive, but the engine was mounted vertically within the frame.

=== K series straight engines ===
The K series BMWs have water-cooled engines of three (K75), or four (K100, K1100, K1200, K1300), or six (K1600) cylinders. Up until 2004, all K series engines, whether three or four cylinders were that of the original "flying brick" layout, so called due to the external appearance of the engine. The layout of these original K engines is unique within motorcycling in that the engine is mounted lying on its side, with the crank on the right side of the bike and the cylinder heads and valve gear on the left. This format had the advantage of allowing the drive system to have only one 90-degree translation within the final drive housing, potentially reducing drive train losses. All of the original format K engines were also mated to a dry automotive-type clutch. The uniform use of the traditional K engine ceased with the K1200 models in 2005, with a new 1200 series engine that was radically different from the flying brick in that it was a conventional transversely 55-degree slant-mounted four-cylinder engine coupled to a wet clutch and gearbox integral to the main engine case. It was at this time also that the K bike shaft drive moved from the right side to the left. Despite this new engine, the traditional flying brick K engine continued in service with the giant K1200LT luxury touring bike until 2009, at which point the flying brick bowed out along with the K1200LT. This was the event that presaged the development of the ultimate K engine in terms of size and complexity, the six-cylinder K1600 series fitted to the K1600GT and GTL models.

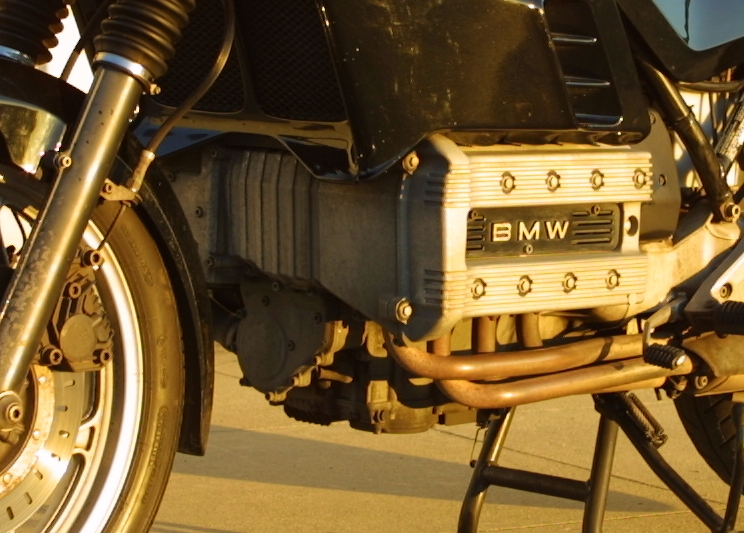
BMW K100 motorcycle engine c. 1986

The first K-series production bike was the K100, which was introduced in 1983. In 1988, BMW introduced the K1 which had the Bosch Motronic fuel injection system.

From 1985 to 1996, the K75 740 cc three-cylinder engine was produced.

In 1991, BMW increased the displacement of the K100 from 987 cc to 1,097 cc and the model designation became the K1100. The K1100LT was the first with the new engine displacement. In 1998 BMW increased the size again to 1,170 cc. This upgraded flat-four engine appeared in the K1200RS. This engine continued in production for the K1200LT range, with a power-boosting update in 2004, until the end of the LT production run.

The later K1200 engine is a 1,157 cc transverse inline-four, announced in 2003 and first seen in the 2005 K1200S. The new engine generates 123 kW (165 hp) and is tilted forwards 55 degrees. It is 43 cm (17 in) wide, giving the bikes a very low center of mass without reducing maximum lean angles.

In October 2008, BMW announced the new K1300GT, K1300S and K1300R models, all of which feature a larger capacity 1293 cc engine producing up to 175 hp (130 kW). The new engine produces maximum power output 1,000 RPM lower than the previous engine, producing more torque due in part from a butterfly flap fitted in the exhaust.

In 2011, BMW launched the K1600 range—the K1600GT and K1600GTL—featuring a new 1,649 cc (100.6 cu in) straight-six engine, which is mounted transversely across the chassis. The engine is angled forward by 50°. The engine was originally used on the Concept 6, a concept bike that was shown at the 2009 EICMA Milan Motor Show. BMW claims that the engine at 560 mm (22 in) wide, just 67 mm (2.6 in) wider than the K1300 engine, is the narrowest six-cylinder engine ever produced. Cylinder bore is 72.0 mm (2.83 in) and the distance between cylinder centres 77 mm (3.0 in). The camshaft is hollow, with cam lobes pressed on, which saves around 2 lb (0.91 kg). The engine has electronic throttle control and multiple drive modes which can be set according to road conditions.

== Model designation ==
BMW uses a three-segment nomenclature for motorcycles. The first segment indicates the engine type, the second indicates the approximate engine displacement in cubic centimeters (with one notable exception: the F 650 GS, which has an engine displacement of 798cc), while the third indicates the class of motorcycle (e.g., sport, sport touring, dual-sport, etc.). The three segments are separated by blanks.

A similar 3-segment nomenclature is used for BMW automobiles. However, there is significantly less consistency across the range with respect to the second segment (engine displacement/100).

Engine type:

- R – air-cooled, horizontally opposed ("boxer") 2-cylinder, oil-cooled 1994–2013, water-cooled starting with the 2013 R1200GS and 2014 R1200RT
- K – water-cooled, inline 3-, 4- or 6-cylinder
- F – water-cooled, vertical 1-cylinder (through 2006), vertical 2-cylinder (after 2006)
- G – water-cooled, vertical 1-cylinder
- S – water-cooled, inline 4-cylinder superbike

Engine displacement in cc:

- Current models: 1600, 1300, 1250, 1000, 900, 800, 650, 450 and 310. Previous models included 850, 1100, 1150 and 1200.
- Older model BMWs divide the approximate engine displacement by ten for the model number. For example, K75 ≈ 750 cc.

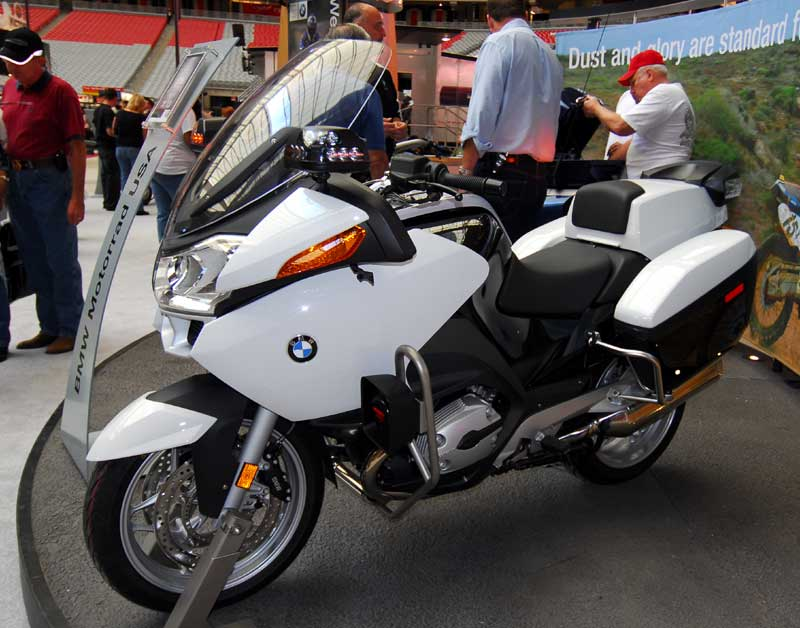
R1200RT-P police model

Styling suffix designations:

- B – Bagger
- C – Cruiser
- CS – Classic Sport
- G/S – Gelände/Strasse Off-road/Street
- GS – Gelände Sport Off-road Sport (Enduro)
- GT – Gran Turismo or Grand Touring
- LS – Luxury Sport
- LT – Luxus Tourer (Luxury Tourer)
- R – Road or Roadster, typically naked
- RR – Racing Replica
- RS – Originally stood for Rennsport, but since 1976 has stood for Reisesport
- RT – Reise Tourer (Travel Tourer)
- S – Sport
- ST – Strasse (Street) or Sport Tourer
- T – Touring

Additionally, a bike may have the following modifiers in its name:

- A – ABS
- L – luxury
- P – police
- C – custom
- PD – Paris Dakar

Examples: K 1200 S, R 1200 RT, F 650 GS, R 1150 RSL, K 1200 LT, K 1200 LT-C, R 1200 RT-P, R 1200 RSA, S 1000 RR.

Prior to the introduction of the K 100 series and the R 1100 series motorcycles, the letter prefix was always the same, and the numbers were either based on displacement, as mentioned above, or were just model numbers.

== Technologies ==
=== Rear suspension ===
==== Single-sided rear suspension ====
The first BMW monolever suspensions appeared in 1980 on the then-new R80G/S range. It had a single universal joint immediately behind the engine/gear-box unit. This system was later included on updated versions of the K & R Series.

==== Paralever ====
Paralever is a further advance in BMW's single-sided rear suspension technology (photo right). It decouples torque reaction as the suspension compresses and extends, avoiding the tendency to squat or rise under acceleration and reducing tyre chatter on the road surface. It was introduced in 1988 R 80 GS and R 100 GS motorcycles.

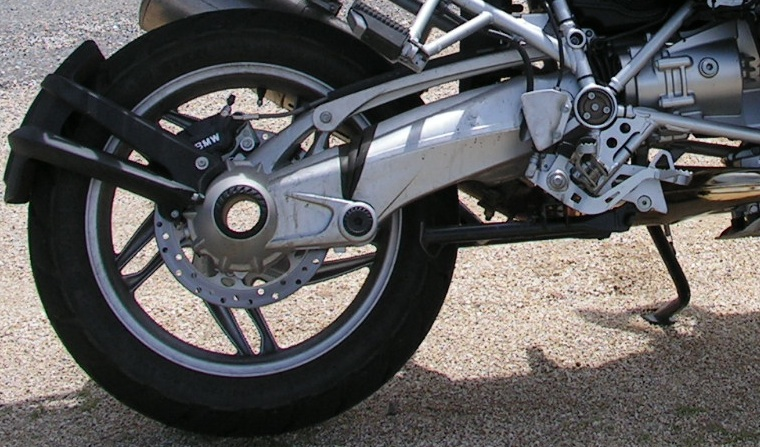
Revised, inverted Paralever on a R1200GS

In 2005, along with the introduction of the "hexhead", BMW inverted the Paralever and moved the torque arm from the bottom to the top of the drive shaft housing (photo right). This reduces underhang of components and tends to increase ground clearance in right lean.

The term "Paralever" is a portmanteau word from "Parallelogram" and "Lever". The "lever is the swinging arm; and the "parallelogram" is the shape between the four elements of the rear suspension (rear drive, drive shaft, transmission, and lower or upper brace). Other motorcycle manufacturers have patented similar designs, including Arturo Magni for MV Agusta and Magni-Moto Guzzi machines, and Moto Guzzi's Compact Reactive Shaft Drive.

=== Front suspension ===
==== Telescopic fork ====
In 1935, BMW fitted the first mass-produced hydraulically damped telescopic fork to its R12 and R17 motorcycles. BMW still uses telescopic forks today on its F-series, G-series, HP, and S1000RR motorcycles.

The R-series, which had used only the Telelever and the Duolever front suspensions for several years, has partly returned to telescopic forks in the 2015 model year with the introduction of the R 1200 R and R 1200 RS.

==== Earles fork ====
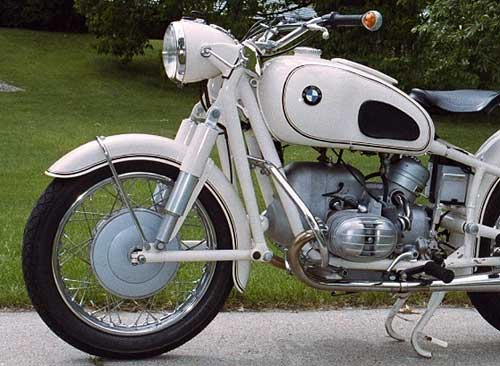
Earles fork on a BMW R60/2

Englishman Ernest Earles designed a unique triangulated fork that, unlike telescopic forks, resists the side-forces introduced by sidecars. BMW fitted the Earles fork to all its models for 14 years from 1955. In the event, this was the year that use of sidecars peaked and quickly fell off in most European markets (e.g. the UK) but the Earles fork system was well liked by solo riders too. It causes the front end of the motorcycle to rise under braking — the reverse of the action of a telescopic fork. The mechanical strength of this design sometimes proved to be a weakness to the rest of the motorcycle, since it transfers impact pressure to the frame where damage is more difficult and expensive to correct.

==== Telelever fork ====
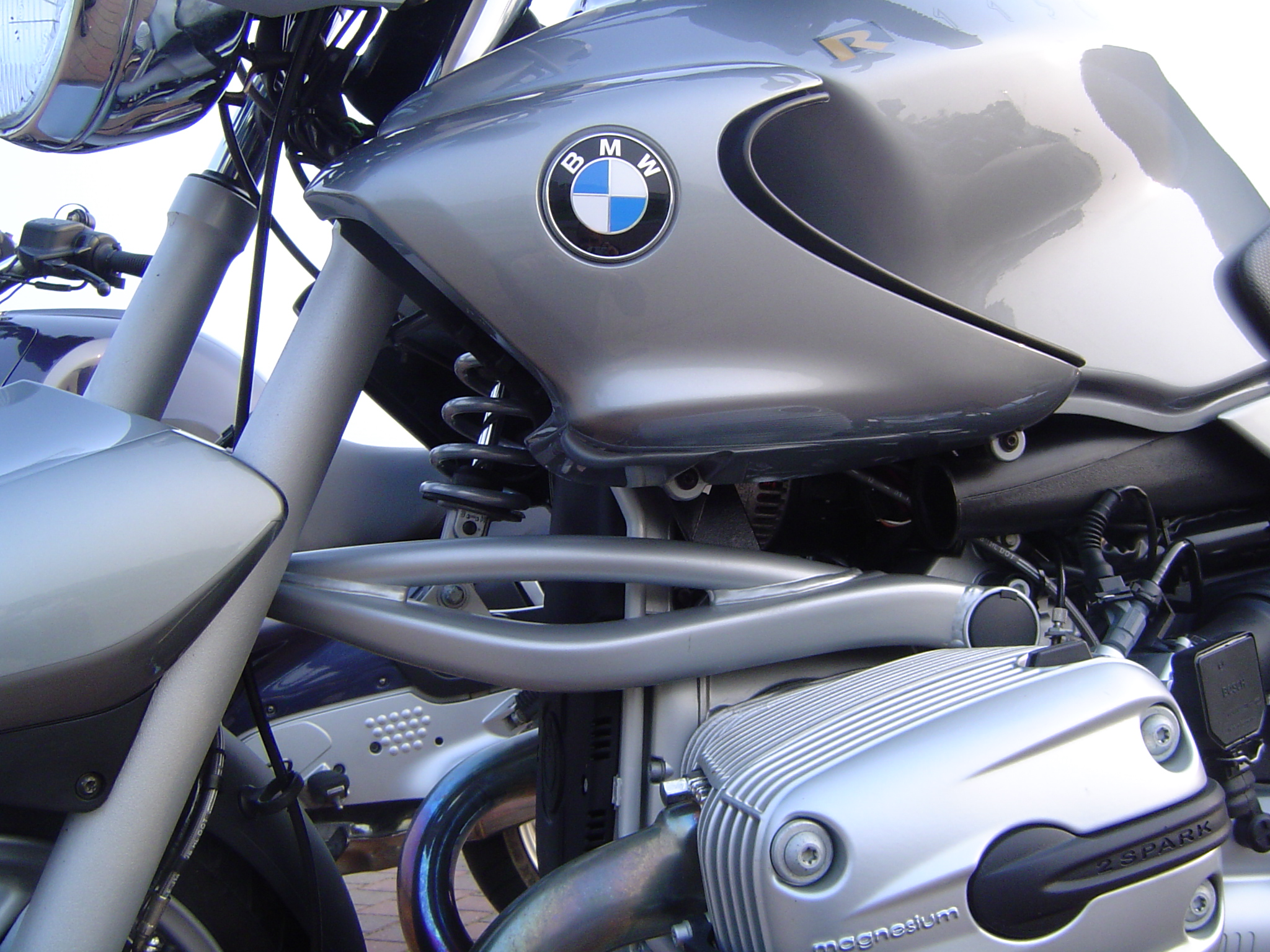
BMW's Telelever front suspension on a R1150R

Developed by Saxon-Motodd in Britain in the early 1980s, the Telelever fork aims to improve handling stability during cornering and braking. The Telelever uses conventional telescopic forks, but the stanchions contain only lubricating oil. Springing and damping functions are dealt with by a monoshock attached to a "Telelever" wishbone. The wishbone pivots on the front of the engine block, and the wishbone's forward end is attached via a rose-joint to a brace connecting the fork sliders. As there is no lower triple clamp, the fork sliders are longer and lighter than on a conventional telescopic fork, and the greater slider/tube overlap reduces both torsional flex and unsprung weight.

The Telelever system's main benefit is that it separates the steering function from the braking and suspension functions. Braking forces are taken back via the wishbone, thereby eliminating brake dive. During braking, the trail and castor angle (rake) increases instead of decreasing as with traditional telescopic forks. Some riders used to conventional forks reported that the Telelever can initially lack "feel", and that the absence of dive is initially disconcerting; but the R1100S BoxerCup Replika (a model with its own race series) shows that the Telelever fork provides responsive and predictable handling.

The term "Telelever" is a portmanteau word from "Telescopic fork" and "Lever"; the "lever" being the wishbone arm.

==== Duolever ====
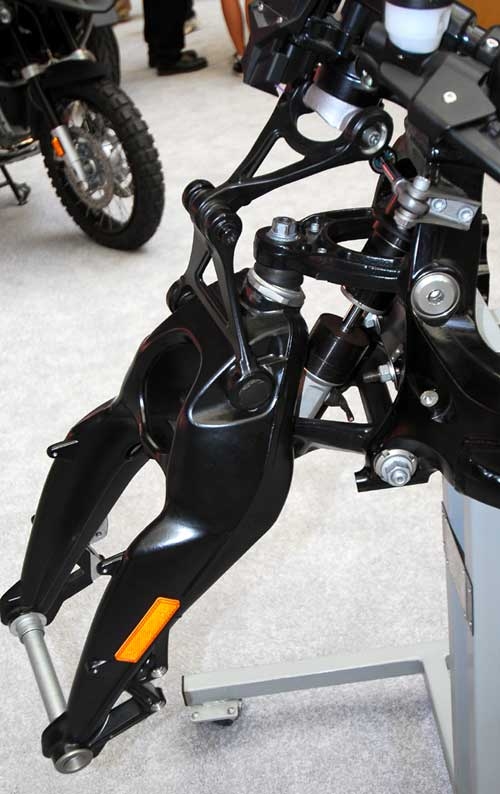
The top of the Duolever suspension

In 2004, BMW announced the K1200S, incorporating a new front suspension based upon a design by Norman Hossack. BMW recognised this fact but paid Hossack no royalties. BMW named its new front suspension the Duolever. As of 2018, the Duolever has been used on all K1300 and K1600 models.

The official BMW Motorrad explanation of the duolever includes this:

The advantage of this front wheel suspension on the motorcycle market at present is its torsional rigidity. The BMW Motorrad Duolever front wheel suspension is not influenced by negative forces in the same manner as a conventional telefork whose fixed and take-off tubes twist laterally as well as longitudinally during jounce/rebound and steering. Its two trailing links absorb the forces resulting from the jounce/rebound and keep the wheel carrier stable. Thus, any torsioning is excluded and the front wheel suspension is very precise. The steering commands of the rider are converted directly and the feedback from the front wheel is transparent in all driving conditions.

A kinematical anti-dive effect is additionally achieved, just as for the Telelever, due to the arrangement of the trailing link bearings. While a conventional telefork during strong braking manoeuvres jounces heavily or locks, the Duolever still has sufficient spring travel remaining in this situation and therefore the rider can still brake into the corner extremely late yet directionally stable.

== Protective clothing ==
BMW Motorrad has long produced protective clothing for motorcyclists. In MotoCAP's independent testing, BMW PaceGuard pants became the world's first textile trousers to achieve a 4-star safety rating (the highest rating achieved by non-leather trousers).
