= List of BMW vehicles =

BMW (Bayerische Motoren Werke AG) is a vehicle manufacturer founded in 1916, based in Bavaria, Germany. The following is a list of BMW automobiles and motorcycles, ordered by year of introduction.

== Current production models ==
Model			Calendar year introduced	Current model		Vehicle description
Model		Model code	Calendar year introduced	Introduction	Update/facelift	Vehicle description
Hatchbacks
	1 Series	F70	2004	2024	–	C-segment/Subcompact executive hatchback. Not offered in North America.
Sedans
	2 Series Gran Coupé	F74 F78	2020	2024	–	C-segment/Subcompact executive fastback sedan.
	3 Series	G50 G58	1975	2026	–	D-segment/compact executive sedan.
	i3	NA0 NA8	2022	2026	–	D-segment/compact executive electric sedan.
	4 Series Gran Coupé	G26	2014	2020	2024	D-segment/compact executive liftback.
	i4	G26 BEV	2021	2021	2024	D-segment/compact executive electric liftback.
	5 Series	G60 G68	1972	2023	Est 2026	E-segment/mid-size executive sedan.
2023 BMW i5 40 eDrive M Sport Pro Sedan	i5	G60 G68 BEV	2023	2023	–	E-segment/mid-size executive electric sedan.
	7 Series	G70 G73	1977	2022	2026	F-segment/full-size luxury sedan.
	i7	G70 BEV	2022	2022	2026	F-segment/full-size electric luxury sedan.
Wagons/Estates
	3 Series	G21	1982	2018	2024	D-segment/compact executive wagon.
	5 Series	G61	1988	2023	Est 2026	E-segment/mid-size executive wagon.
	i5	G61 BEV	2024	2024	Est 2026	E-segment/executive electric wagon.
Crossovers/SUVs
	X1	U11 U12	2009	2022	–	C-segment/subcompact luxury crossover SUV.
	iX1	U11 U12 BEV	2022	2022	–	C-segment/subcompact electric luxury crossover SUV
	X2	U10	2018	2023	–	C-segment/subcompact luxury crossover coupé SUV.
	iX2	U10 BEV	2023	2023	–	C-segment/subcompact electric luxury crossover coupé SUV
	X3	G45 G48	2003	2024	–	D-segment/compact luxury crossover SUV
	iX3	NA5 NA6	2020	2025	–	D-segment/compact electric luxury crossover SUV
	iX4	NA7	2026	2026	–	D-segment/compact electric luxury crossover coupé SUV
	X5	G65 G78	1999	2026	–	E-segment/mid-size luxury crossover SUV.
	iX	I20	2021	2021	2025	E-segment/mid-size electric luxury crossover SUV.
	iX5	G65 BEV	2026	2026	–	E-segment/mid-size electric luxury crossover SUV.
	X6	G06	2008	2020	2023	E-segment/mid-size luxury crossover coupé SUV.
	X7	G07	2018	2018	2022	F-segment/full-size luxury SUV.
	XM	G09	2022	2022	–	Plug-in hybrid F-segment/full-size luxury crossover SUV.
Roadsters/Sports cars
	2 Series	G42	2014	2021	2024	C-segment/Subcompact executive coupé
	4 Series	G22 G23	2014	2020	2024	D-segment/compact executive coupé and convertible.
Minivans/MPVs
	2 Series Active Tourer	U06	2014	2021	–	Two-row compact MPV.

== Discontinued vehicles ==
BMW model timeline

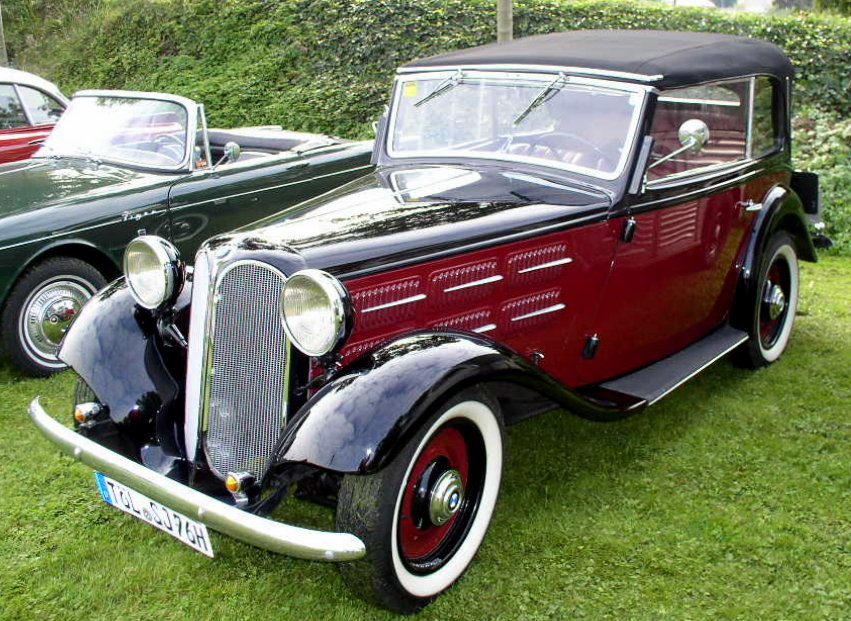
1934 BMW 303

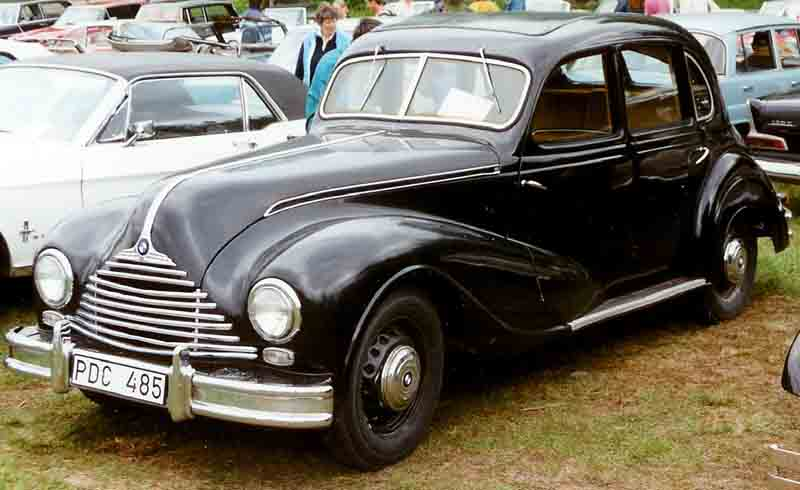
1950 BMW 340

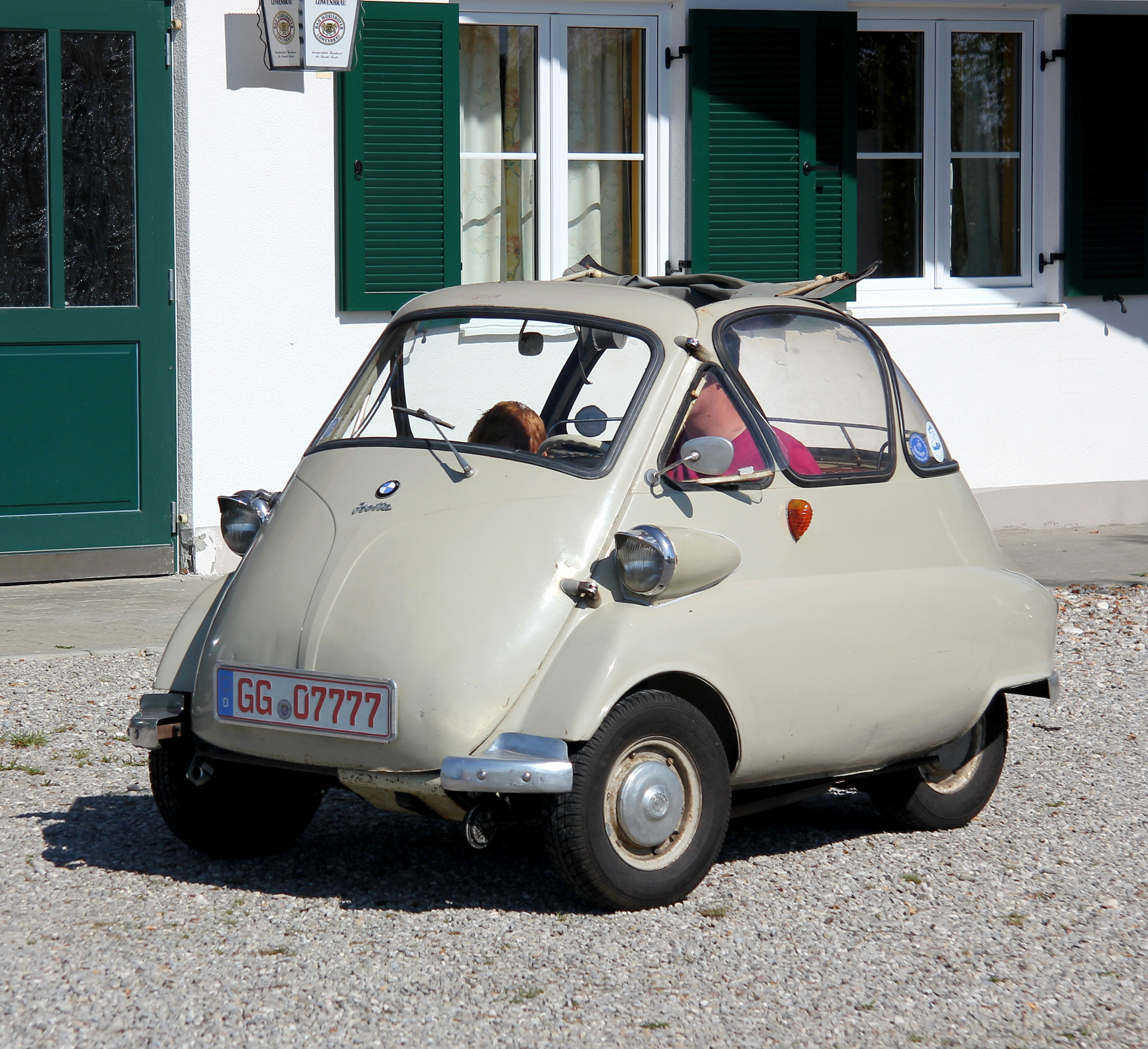
1955 BMW Isetta

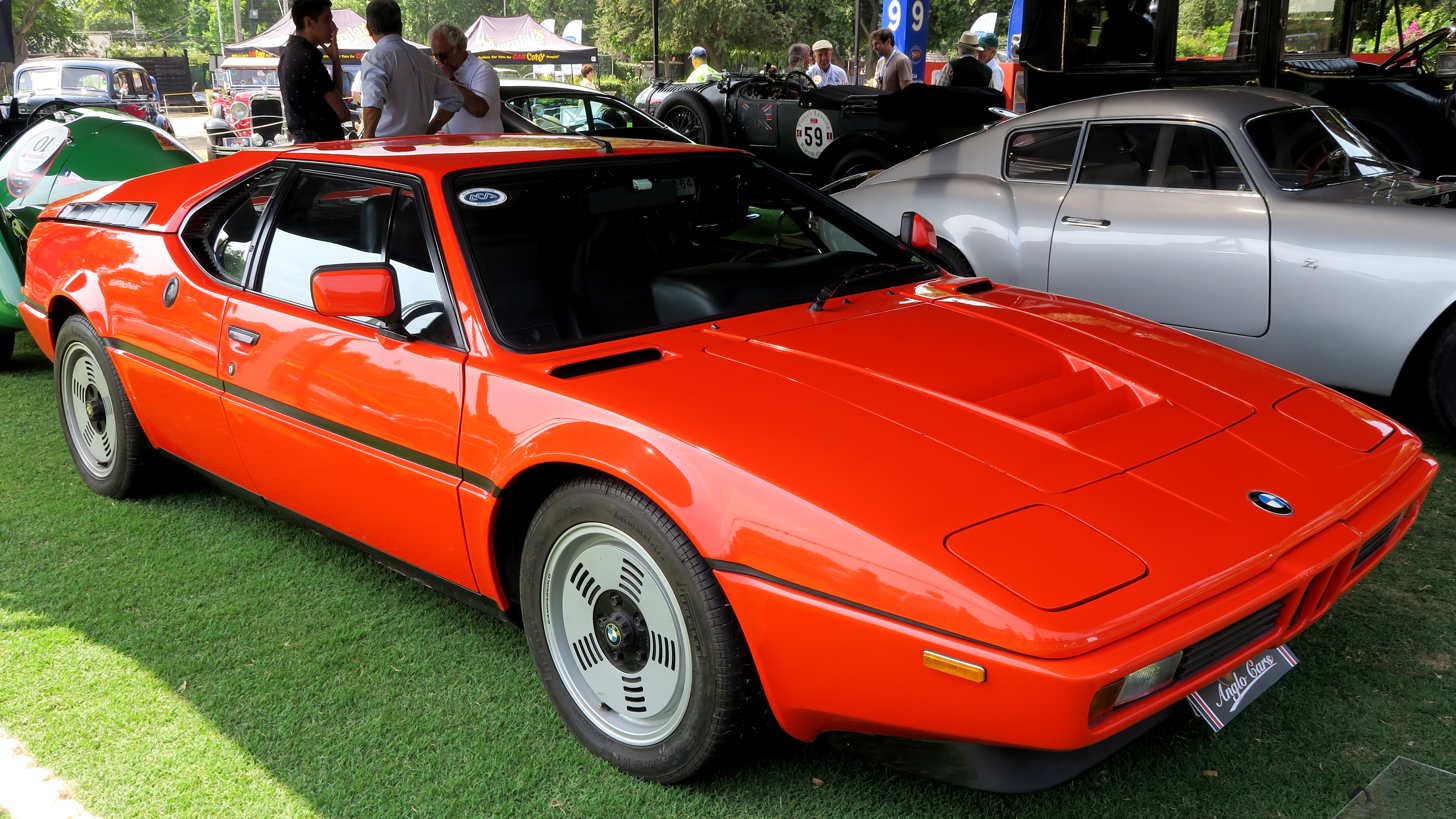
1981 BMW M1

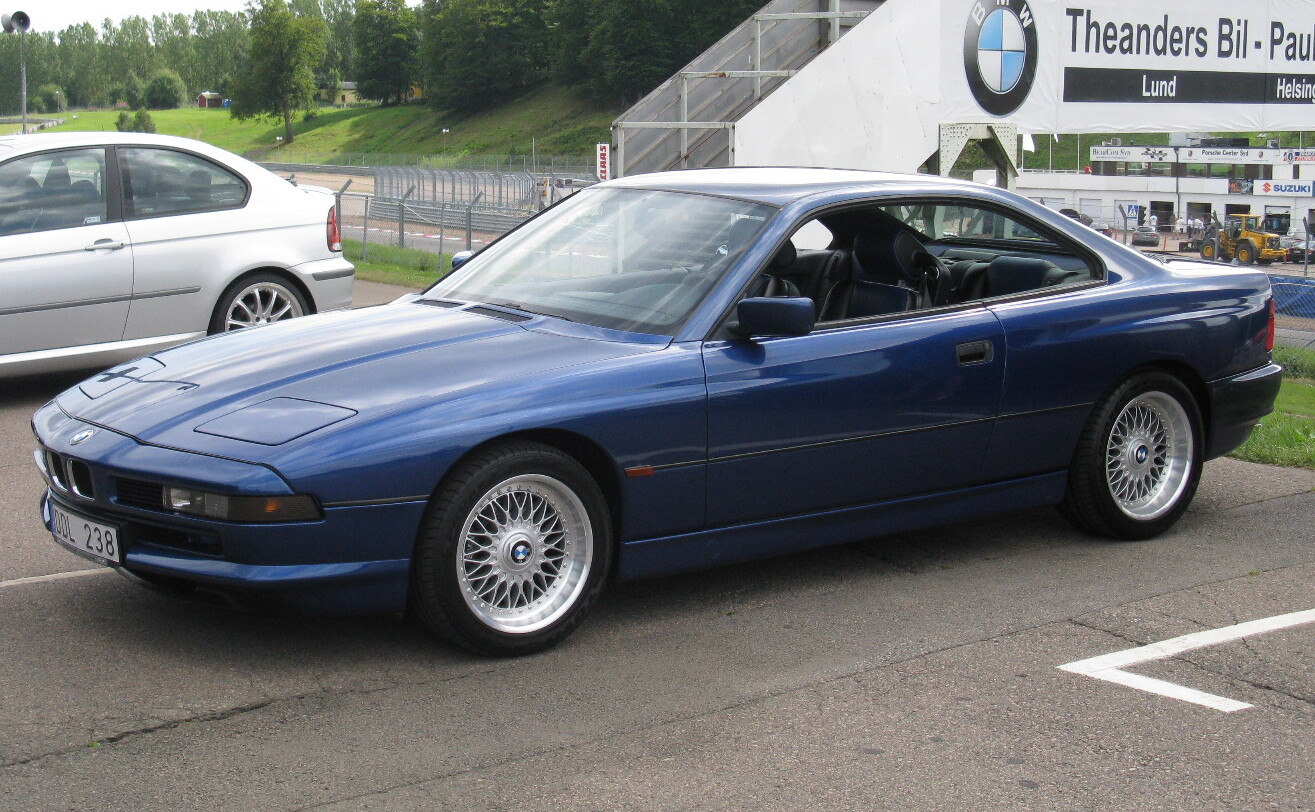
1993 BMW 8 Series

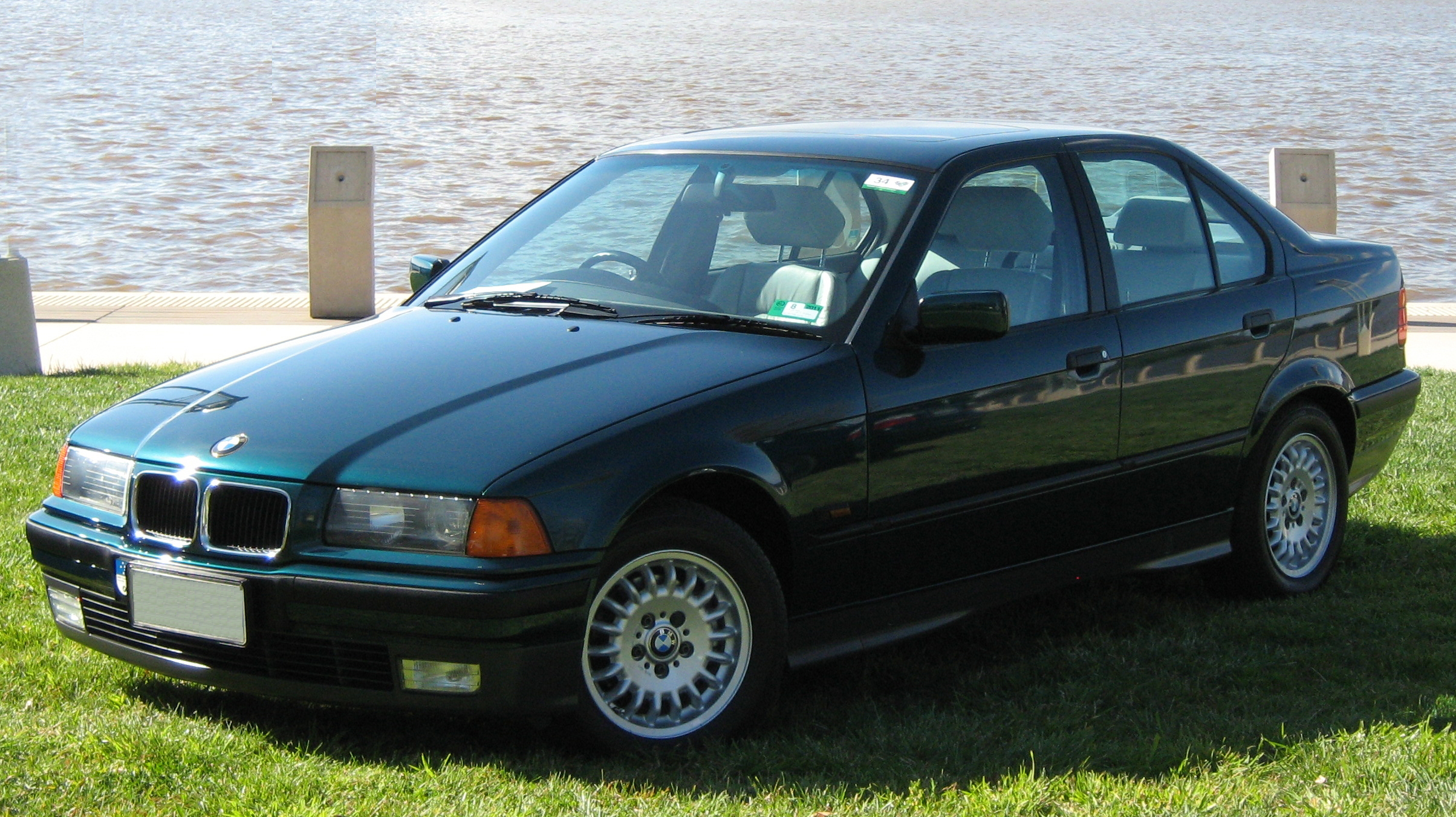
1994 BMW 3 Series

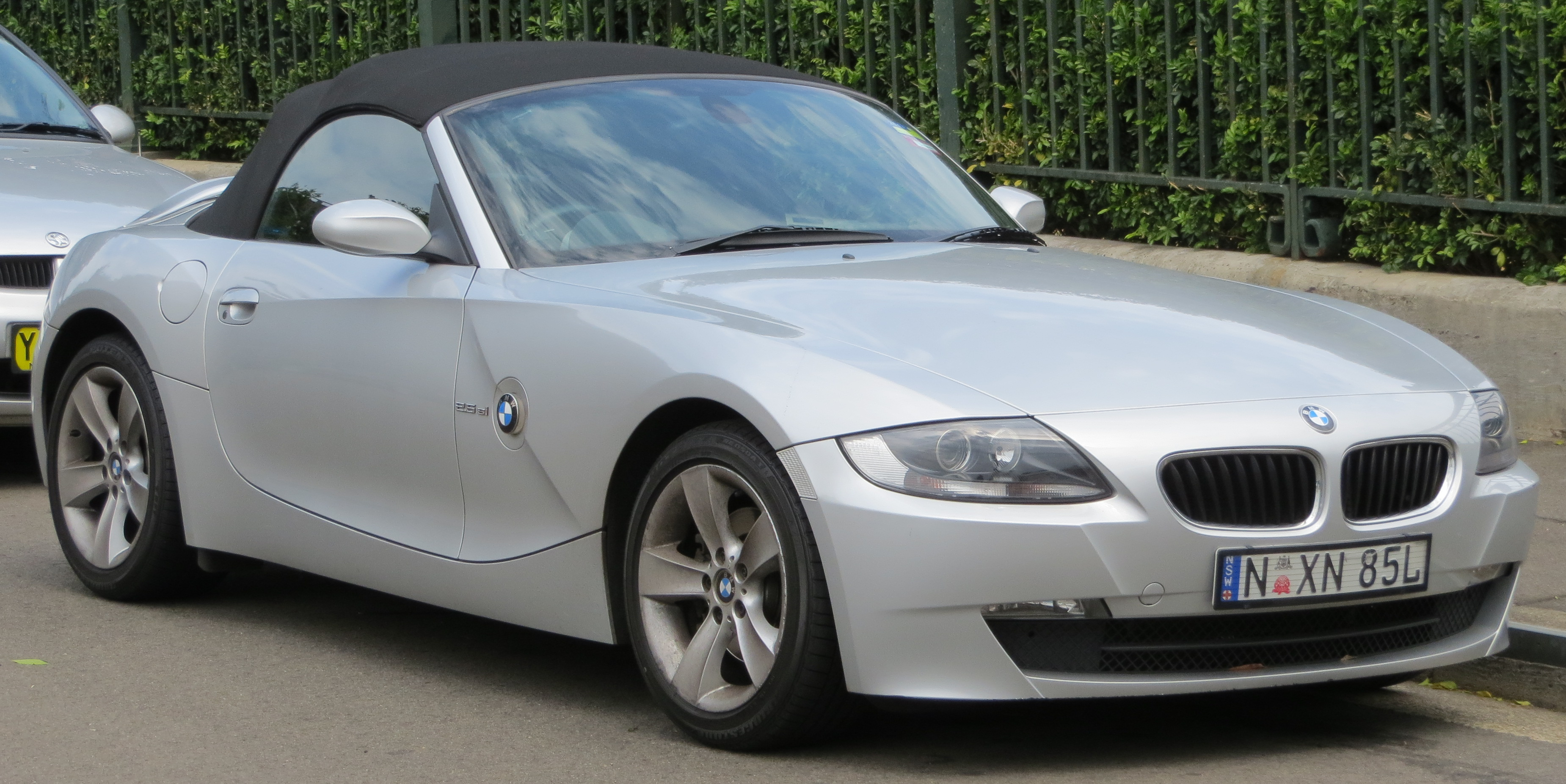
2006 BMW Z4

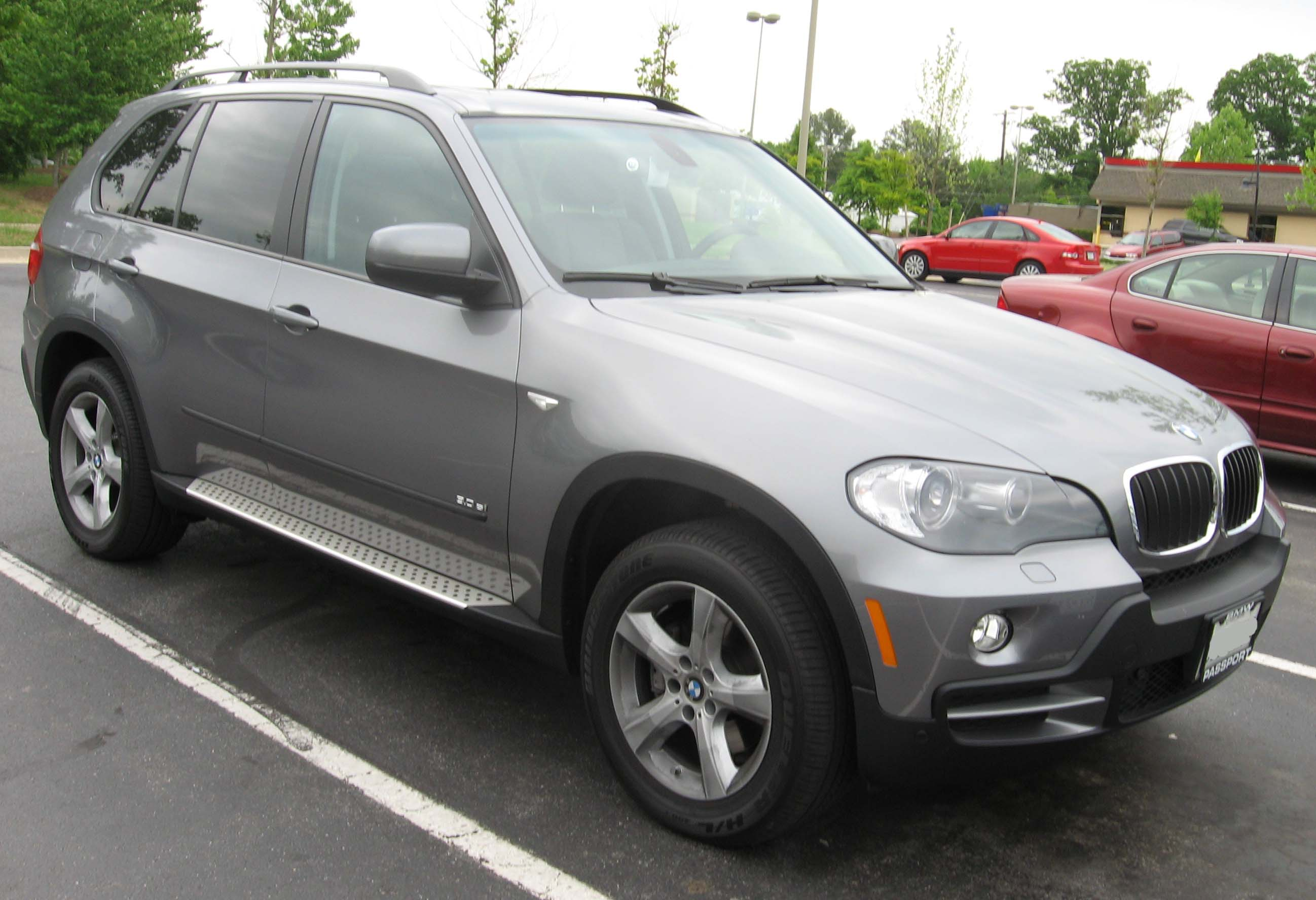
2007 BMW X5

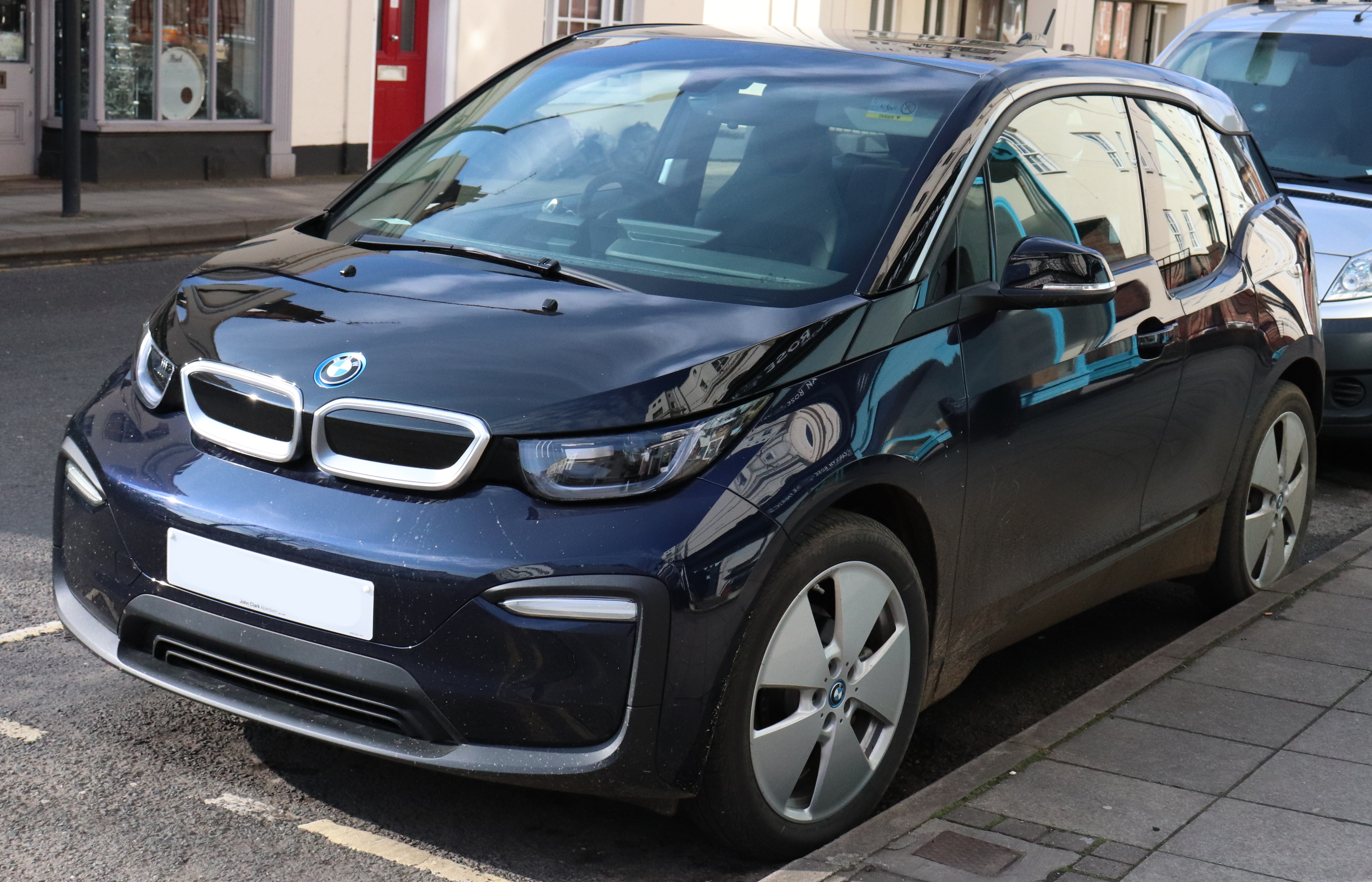
2013 BMW i3

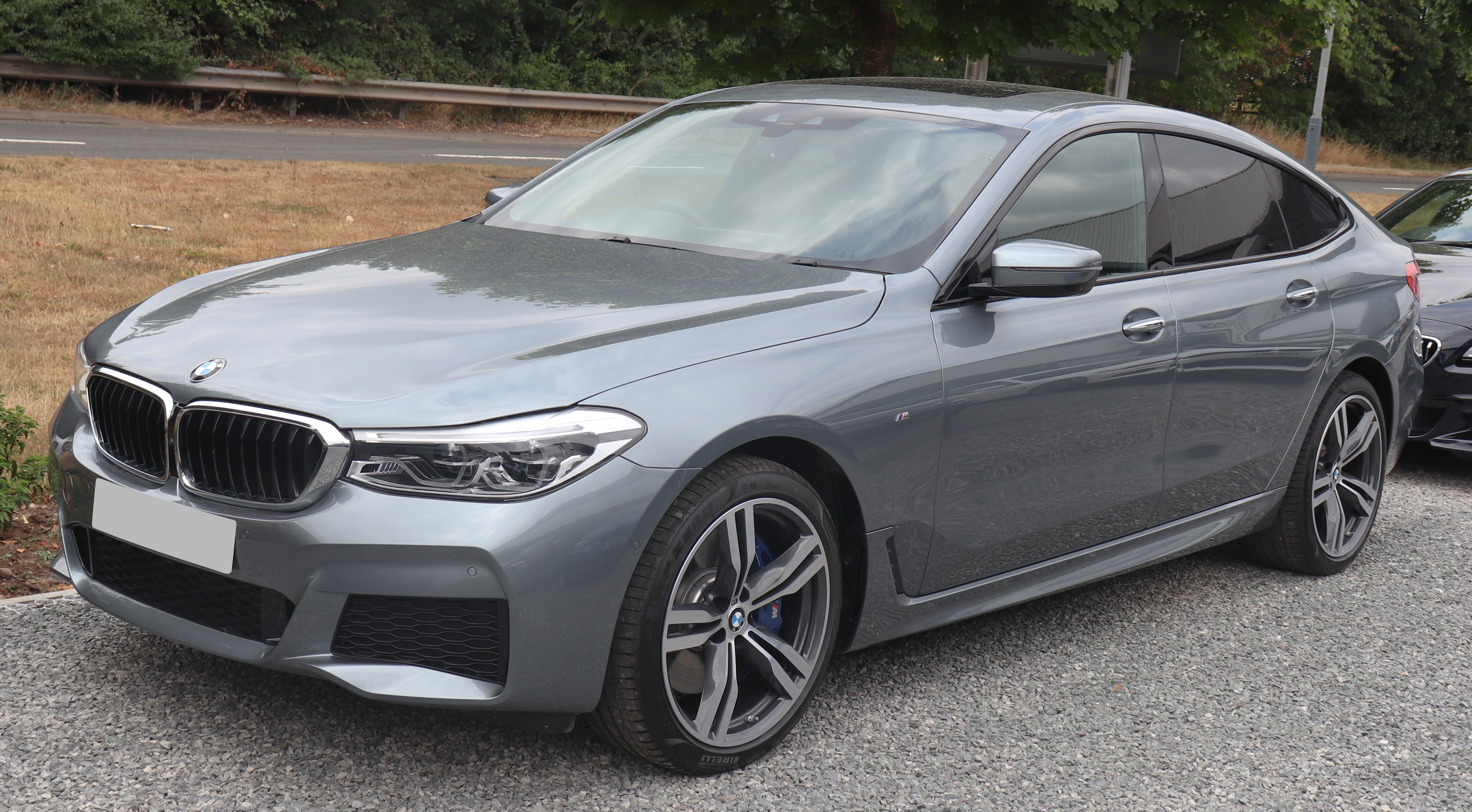
2018 BMW 6 Series

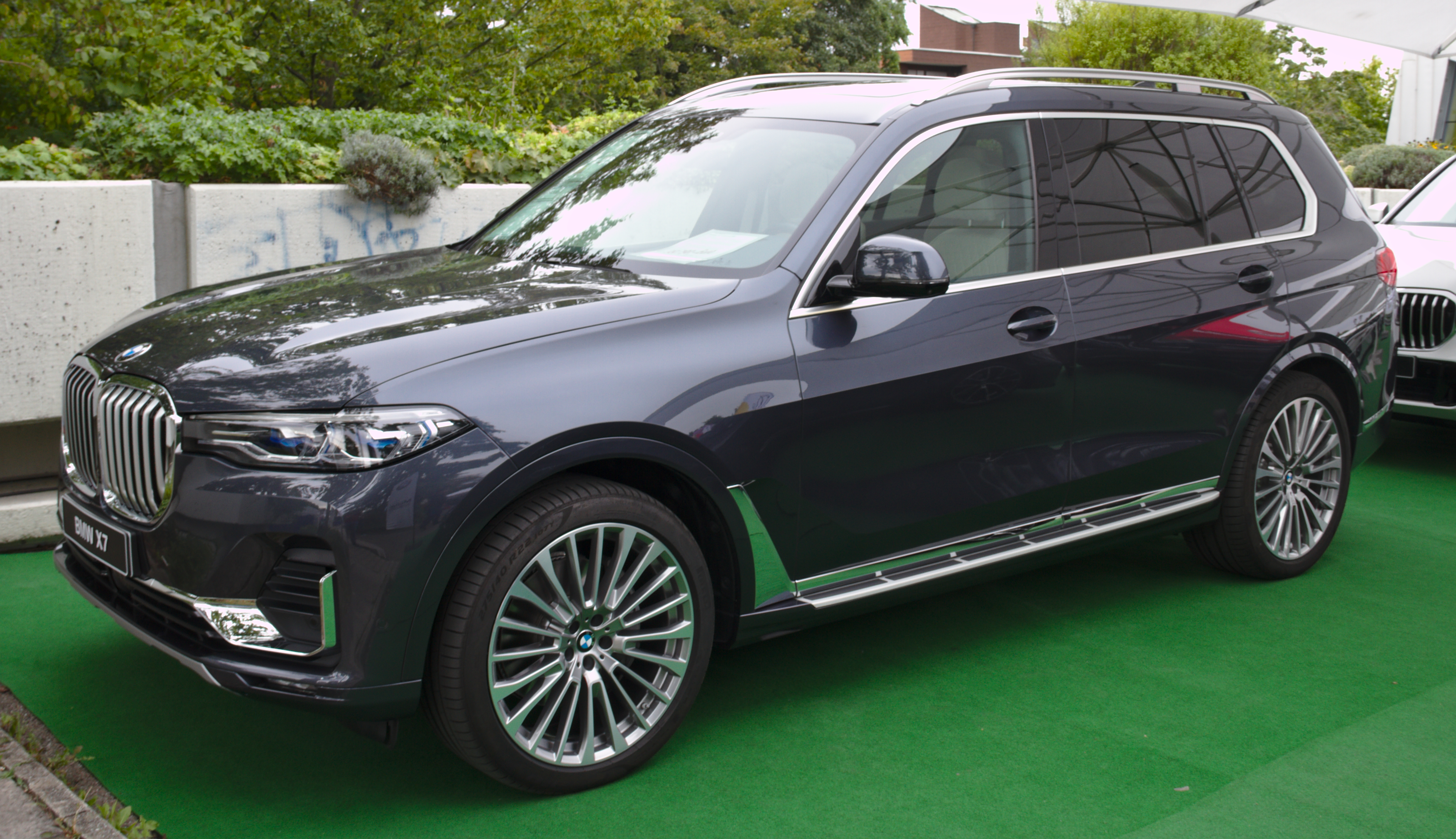
2019 BMW X7

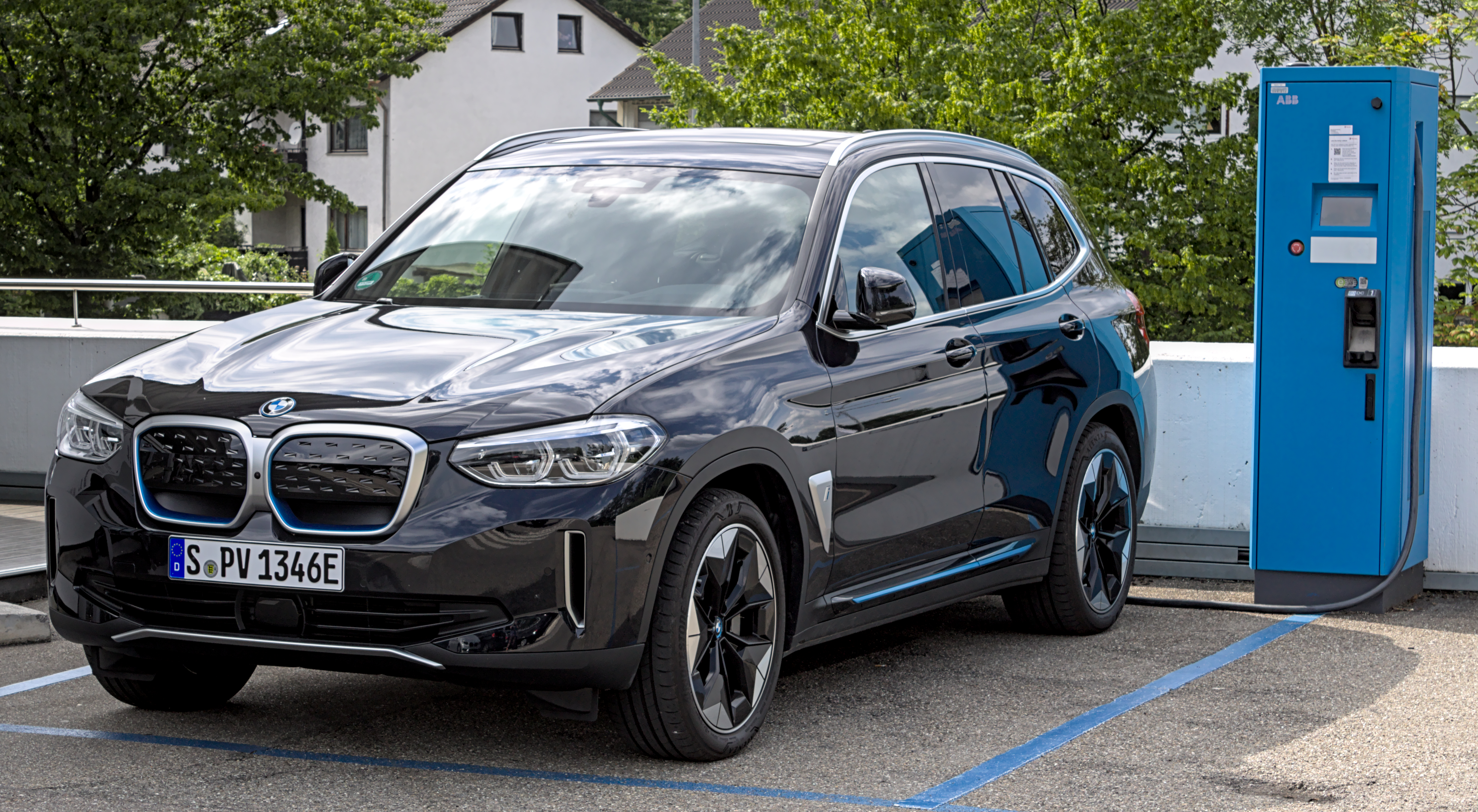
2021 BMW iX3

Production cars
Model series	Years	Vehicle class
3/15	1927–1932	Economy car
F 76	1932–1934	Freight tricycle
3/20 PS	1932–1934	Compact car
303	1933–1934	Compact car
309	1934–1936	Compact car
315	1934–1937	Compact car
319	1935–1936	Compact car
328	1936–1940	Roadster
326	1936–1941; 1945–1946	Mid-size luxury car
329	1937	Compact car
327	1937–1941; 1946–1955	Grand tourer
320	1937–1938	Mid-size luxury car
325	1937–1940	Off-road vehicle
321	1938–1941; 1945–1950	Mid-size luxury car
335	1939–1941	Full-size luxury car
340	1949–1955	Full-size luxury car
501	1952–1962	Mid-size luxury car
Isetta	1953–1962	Microcar
502	1954–1963	Mid-size luxury car
505	1955	Official state car
503	1956–1959	Grand tourer
507	1956–1959	Roadster
700	1959–1965	Compact car
3200 CS	1962–1965	Grand tourer
New Class (sedans)	1962–1972	Mid-size luxury car
New Class (coupés)	1965–1969	Grand tourer
02 Series	1966–1977	Compact executive car
New Six coupés (E9)	1968–1975	Grand tourer
New Six sedans (E3)	1968–1977	Full-size luxury car
5 Series (E12)	1972–1981	Mid-size luxury car
3 Series (E21)	1975–1983	Compact executive car
6 Series (E24)	1976–1989	Grand tourer
7 Series (E23)	1977–1987	Full-size luxury car
M1	1978–1981	Sports car
5 Series (E28)	1981–1988	Mid-size luxury car
3 Series (E30)	1982–1994	Compact executive car
7 Series (E32)	1986–1994	Full-size luxury car
5 Series (E34)	1987–1996	Mid-size luxury car
Z1	1989–1991	Roadster
8 Series (E31)	1989–1999	Grand tourer
3 Series (E36)	1990–2000	Compact executive car
7 Series (E38)	1994–2001	Full-size luxury car
Z3	1995–2002	Roadster and coupé
5 Series (E39)	1995–2003	Mid-size luxury car
3 Series (E46)	1998–2006	Compact executive car
X5 (E53)	1999–2006	Mid-size luxury SUV
Z8	2000–2003	Roadster
7 Series (E65/E66)	2001–2008	Full-size luxury car
Z4 (E85/E86)	2002–2008	Roadster, coupé
5 Series (E60/E61)	2003–2010	Mid-size luxury car
6 Series (E63/E64)	2003–2010	Grand tourer
X3 (E83)	2003–2010	Compact luxury SUV
1 Series (E81/E82/E87/E88)	2004–2013	Hatchback, coupé, convertible
3 Series (E90/E91/E92/E93)	2005–2013	Compact executive car
X5 (E70)	2006–2013	Mid-size luxury SUV
X6 (E71)	2008–2014	Mid-size luxury SUV
7 Series (F01/F02)	2008–2015	Full-size luxury car
Z4 (E89)	2009–2016	Roadster
X1 (E84)	2009–2015	Sub-compact luxury SUV
5 Series (F07/F10/F11)	2010–2017	Mid-size luxury car
6 Series (F06/F12/F13)	2011–2018	Grand tourer
X3 (F25)	2011–2017	Compact luxury SUV
1 Series (F20/F21)	2011–2019	Sub-compact executive car
3 Series (F30/F31/F34)	2011–2020	Compact executive car
i3 (I01)	2013–2022	Sub-compact executive car (electric)
4 Series (F32/F33/F36)	2013–2020	Compact executive car
2 Series (F22/F23)	2013–2021	Subcompact car
X5 (F15)	2013–2018	Mid-size luxury SUV
2 Series (F45/F46)	2014–2021	Sub-compact MPV Large MPV
i8	2014–2020	Sports car (hybrid)
X4 (F26)	2014–2018	Compact luxury SUV
X6 (F16)	2014–2019	Mid-size luxury SUV
X1 (F48)	2015–2022	Sub-compact luxury SUV
7 Series (G11/G12)	2015–2022	Full-size luxury car
5 Series (G30/G31)	2016–2023	Mid-size luxury car
1 Series (F52)	2017–2023	Sub-compact executive car
6 Series (G32)	2017–2023	Grand tourer
X3 (G01)	2017–2024	Compact luxury SUV
X2 (F39)	2018–2023	Sub-compact luxury SUV
X4 (G02)	2018–2025	Compact luxury SUV
X5 (G05)	2018–2026	Mid-size luxury SUV
Z4 (G29)	2018–2026	Roadster
8 Series (G14/G15/G16)	2018–2026	Grand tourer
1 Series (F40)	2019–2024	Sub-compact executive car
2 Series (F44)	2020–2024	Sub-compact executive car
iX3 (G08)	2020–2025	Compact luxury SUV (electric)
i3 (G28)	2022–2026	Compact executive car (electric)

== Motorcycles ==
BMW Motorrad has produced motorcycles bearing the BMW name since the introduction of the BMW R32 in 1923. Prior to that date it produced engines for other manufacturers' motorcycles.

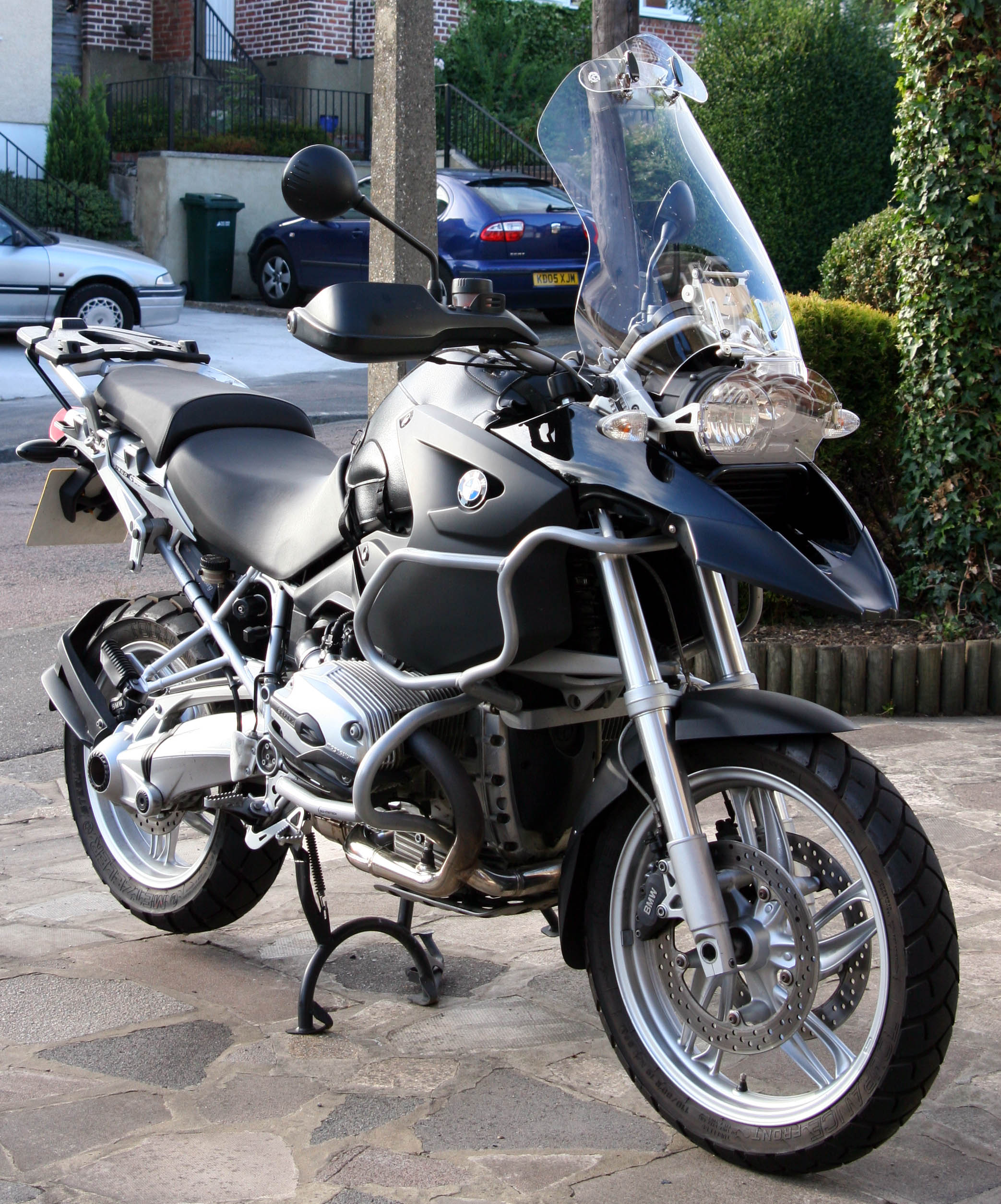
2010 BMW R1200GS

=== Present day ===
- BMW C600 Sport and C650GT
- BMW CE 02
- BMW F650GS & F800GS
- BMW F900R
- BMW G 310 GS
- BMW G 310 R
- BMW K1300GT
- BMW K1600 series
- BMW S1000RR
- BMW S1000XR
- BMW M1000RR
- BMW HP4 Race
- BMW R1250RS
- BMW R1300GS
- BMW R12
- BMW R18

=== Discontinued ===
- 1923–1926 BMW R32
- 1924–1926 BMW R37
- 1925–1928 BMW R39
- 1925–1928 BMW R42
- 1926–1928 BMW R47
- 1928–1929 BMW R52
- 1928–1929 BMW R57
- 1928–1929 BMW R62
- 1928–1929 BMW R63
- 1929–1935 BMW WR 750 (racing motorcycle)
- 1930–1934 BMW R 11
- 1930–1934 BMW R16
- 1931–1936 BMW R2
- 1931–1937 BMW R4
- 1934 BMW R7 (prototype)
- 1935–1942 BMW R12
- 1935–1937 BMW R17
- 1935–1951 BMW 500 Kompressor (record motorcycle)
- 1936 BMW R3
- 1936–1937 BMW R5
- 1937 BMW R6
- 1937–1938 BMW R20
- 1937–1940 BMW R35
- 1938–1940 BMW R23
- 1938–1941 BMW R51
- 1938–1941 BMW R61
- 1938–1941 BMW R66
- 1938–1941 BMW R71
- 1939 BMW R36 (prototype)
- 1941–1946 BMW R75
- 1947–1948 BMW R10 (prototype)
- 1948–1950 BMW R24
- 1950 BMW R51/2
- 1950–1951 BMW R25
- 1950–1955 BMW R10 (prototype)
- 1951 BMW R67
- 1951–1953 BMW R25/2
- 1951–1955 BMW R51/3
- 1951–1955 BMW R67/2
- 1952–1954 BMW R68
- 1953–? BMW RS54 (racing motorcycle)
- 1953–1956 BMW R25/3
- 1955–1960 BMW R50
- 1955–1960 BMW R60
- 1956–1960 BMW R26
- 1960–1966 BMW R27
- 1960–1969 BMW R50/2
- 1960–1969 BMW R60/2
- 1960–1969 BMW R50S
- 1960–1969 BMW R69S
- 1969–1973 BMW /5 motorcycles
- 1970s–1985 BMW R45
- 1973–1976 BMW R90S
- 1974–1976 BMW /6 motorcycles
- 1976–1996 BMW R100 and /7 motorcycles
- 1978–1984 BMW R65
- 1980–1987 BMW R80G/S
- 1982–1992 BMW K100
- 1985–1995 K75
- 1988–1993 BMW K1
- 1993–2001 BMW R1100RS
- 1994–1996 BMW R1100GS
- 1994–1999 BMW R1100R
- 1996–2001 BMW R1100RT
- 1996–2005 BMW K1200RS
- 1997–2004 BMW R1200C and R1200CL
- 1998–2009 K1200LT
- 1998–2005 BMW R1100S
- 1999–2004, 2005-2006 BMW R1150GS and R1150GSA
- 2001–2005 BMW F650CS
- 2001–2005 BMW R1150R
- 2004–2019 BMW R1200GS
- 2005–2006 BMW R1200S
- 2005–2006 BMW HP2 Enduro
- 2005–2007 BMW R1200ST
- 2005–2019 BMW R1200RT
- 2006–2008 BMW HP2 Megamoto
- 2006–2009 BMW G650X series
- 2006–2018 BMW R1200R
- 2006–2013 BMW F800S and F800ST
- 2008–2011 BMW G450X
- 2008–2012 BMW HP2 Sport
- 2008–2016 BMW G650GS
- 2008–2016 BMW K1300S
- 2009–2015 BMW K1300R
- 2009–2019 BMW F800R
- 2012–2014 BMW HP4
- 2013–2020 BMW F800GT
- 2014–2023 BMW R nineT
- 2015–2018 BMW R1200RS
- 2019–2023 BMW R1250GS

== Nomenclature ==
=== Three digit model names ===
Beginning with the 1972 E12 5 Series, most BMW automobiles (except for the i Series, X Series and Z Series) have used a model name consisting of three numbers, usually followed by one or two letters.

In this naming system:

- The first number represents the model series
- The last two digits represent the engine displacement in deciliters (one liter equals 10 deciliters).
- The letters provide additional information on the model variant.

Using the examples of the 318is, 120d and 760Li model names:

- 318is means a 3 Series with a 1.8 litre engine, with the "i" meaning a fuel-injected petrol engine and the "s" meaning that sport options are fitted.
- 120d means a 1 Series with a Turbocharged 2.0 Litre engine, with the "d" meaning a diesel engine.
- 760Li means a 7 Series with a 6.0 litre, with the "L" meaning a long-wheelbase model and the "i" meaning a fuel-injected petrol engine.

In Germany the model series are referred to by their German pronunciation: Einser ("One-er") for the 1 Series, Dreier ("Three-er") for the 3 Series, Fünfer ("Five-er") for the 5 Series, Sechser ("Six-er") for the 6 Series and Siebener ("Seven-er") for the 7 Series. These are not actually slang, but are the normal way that such letters and numbers are pronounced in German.

=== Exceptions ===
There are various models where the engine size is not as implied by the last two digits, such as when a turbocharged engine is used. For example:

- From 1976 to 1986, various models using a 3.2 litre version of the M30 engine were named 533i, 633i, etc.
- Similarly, from 1987 to 1992, the models using a 3.4 litre version of the M30 engine were named 535i, 635i, etc.
- The 1982 to 1987 models using a 2.7 litre version of the M20 were called the 325e and 525e (528e in the United States).
- The 1980 to 1983 European 745i models used a turbocharged 3.2–3.4 litre engine.
- From 1994 to 1999, models using the 5.4 litre M73 engine were named 750i and 850Ci.
- Similarly, from 1996 to 1999, models using a 4.4 litre version of the M62 engine were named 540i, 740i and 840Ci. From 2001 to 2007, the situation was reversed, because models using a 4.4 litre version of the N62 engine were named 545i, 645i and 745i. Models using a 4.8 litre version of the N62 engine were named 550i, 650i and 750i.
- From 1996 to 2001, the 318i model used a 1.9 litre version of the M44 engine. Then from 2001, the 318i model used 2.0 litre engines. Since 2015, the 318i model has used a 1.5 litre turbocharged engine.
- Since 1995, various models using a 2.5 litre six-cylinder engine have been named 323i and 523i. For the E36, E46 and E39, this was due to the previous 325i/525i models being higher in the model range than the new models, therefore a lower number was used to indicate to customers that it was not a highly equipped model.
- Similarly, from 2007 to 2013, various models using a detuned 3.0 litre six-cylinder engine have been named 125i, 128i, 325i and 528i.
- Also, several diesel models using a 3.0 litre six-cylinder engine during this time were named 325d, 525d, etc.
- The increasing use of turbochargers has resulted in the model name no longer representing the engine displacement. This began in 2006, when the N54 3.0 litre turbo petrol engine was introduced in the E90 335i model. More recent examples are a 1.5 litre turbo petrol engine being used in the 116i and 318i models, and a 3.0 litre turbo diesel engine being used in the 540d and 750d models.

Even for non-turbo engines, the number of cylinders cannot be determined from the model name. For example, the 1987–1991 530i uses a six-cylinder engine, the 1992–1996 530i uses a V8 engine and the 2000–2016 530i uses a six-cylinder engine (to add to the confusion, just prior to the 1992 V8 530i being introduced, the 535i model used a six-cylinder engine).

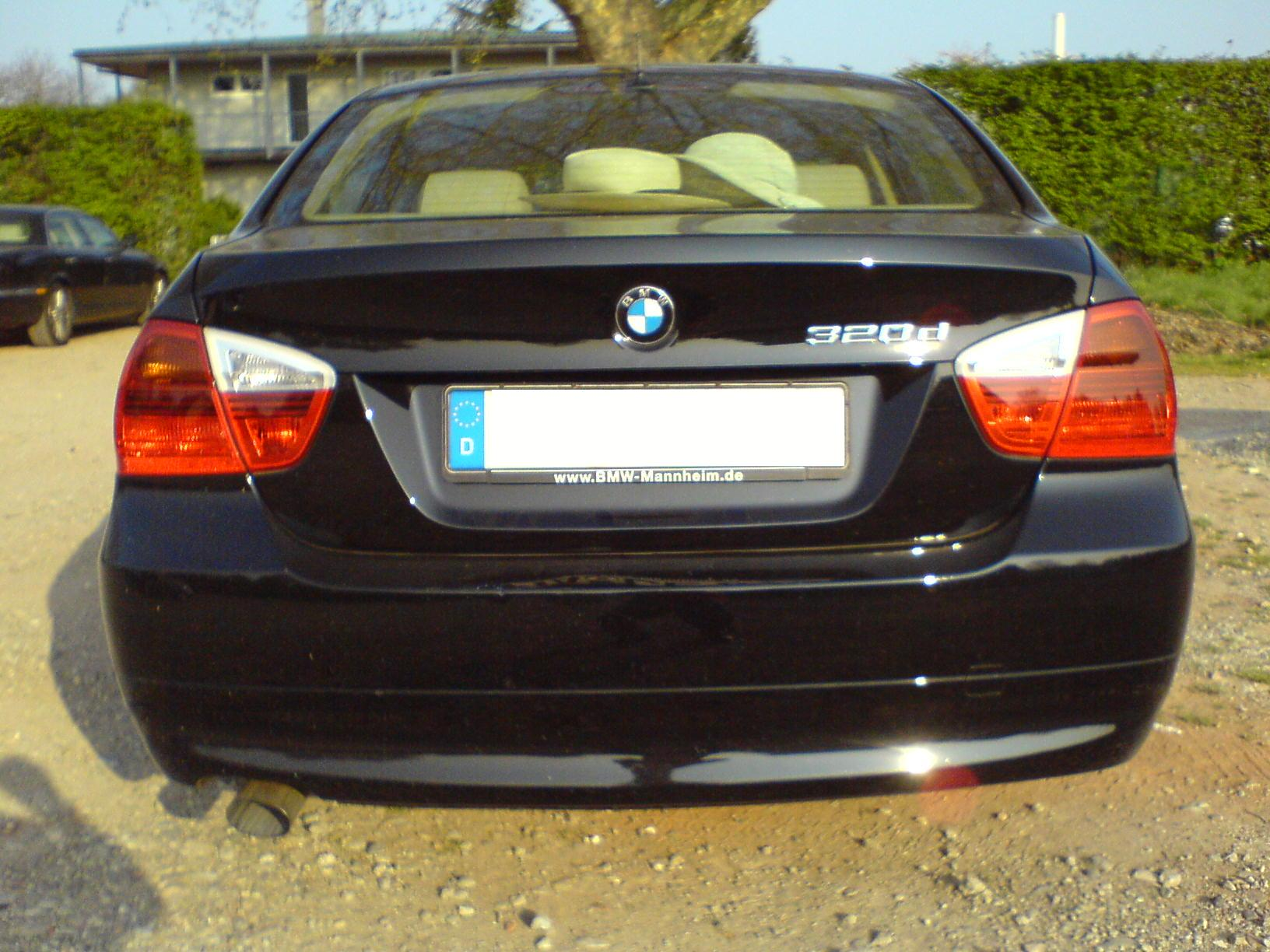
BMW 320d, with badge signifying diesel model

=== Letters ===
The meaning of letters can change between models. The most commonly used letters are:

- d = diesel engine
- i = fuel-injected petrol engine
- L = long wheelbase – sometimes the L is the first letter (e.g. 750Li), and sometimes it is the last letter (e.g. 750iL).
- td = turbodiesel
- x / xDrive = all-wheel drive – sometimes the x is the first letter (e.g. 325xi), and sometimes it is the last letter (e.g. 325ix)

Other letters include:

- C = coupé/convertible (only used on E24, E46 and E63 models)
- e = eta (from the Greek letter 'η') a model tuned for fuel efficiency, or PHEV versions for later models (E30 325e, G30 530e, G11 740e)
- s/S = sport, this can represent either upgraded interior/cosmetic options or increased engine power depending on the model.
- T = Touring (wagon/estate)
- t = hatchback (only used on some 3 Series Compact models)

=== X Series and Z Series ===
Until 2009, the model name for X Series and Z Series vehicles was:

- The engine size in litres
- Followed by an "i" for petrol engines or a "d" for diesel engines

Examples of this naming convention are "X5 3.0d" and "Z3 1.8i". Sometimes an "s" was added after the engine size for higher performance models (for example, "Z4 3.0si" and "X5 4.8is").

Since 2009, a revised model naming system has been used. The model names are as follows:

- "sDrive" for rear-wheel drive or "xDrive" for all-wheel drive.
- Then the nominal engine size in litres multiplied by 10 (e.g. "25" for a 2.5 litre engine), although many of the anomalies described above also apply here.
- Lastly, "i" for petrol engines or "d" for diesel engines.

Examples of this naming convention are "X3 xDrive28d" and "Z4 sDrive30i". Sometimes an "s" was added at the end for higher performance models (for example, "Z4 sDrive 35is").

BMW M models of X Series and Z Series models typically just have the model name "M" (e.g. X6 M, Z4 M). "M Performance" models have the letter "M" inserted after the series, followed by the rest of the naming convention for the non-M models (e.g. X6 M50d).

BMW M logo, used as a badge on M models

=== M Models ===
An "M' – for Motorsport – identifies the vehicle as a high-performance model of a particular series (e.g. M2, M3, M4, M5, M6, M8, etc.). For example, the M8 is the highest performing vehicle in the 8 Series lineup.

== See also ==
- List of BMW engines
- List of automobile-related articles
