= BMW sDrive =

Single axle drive architecture

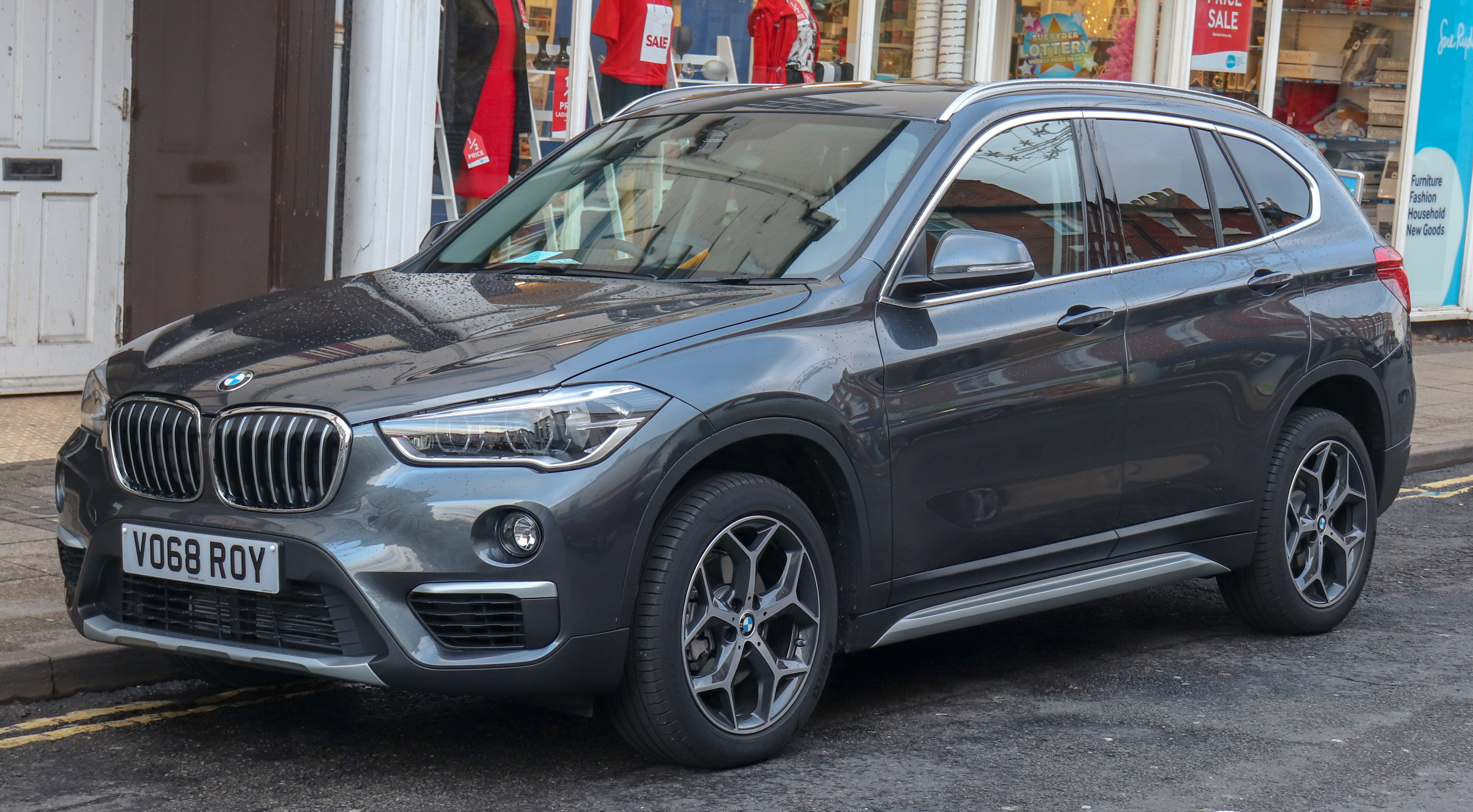
BMW X1 sDrive18i (front)

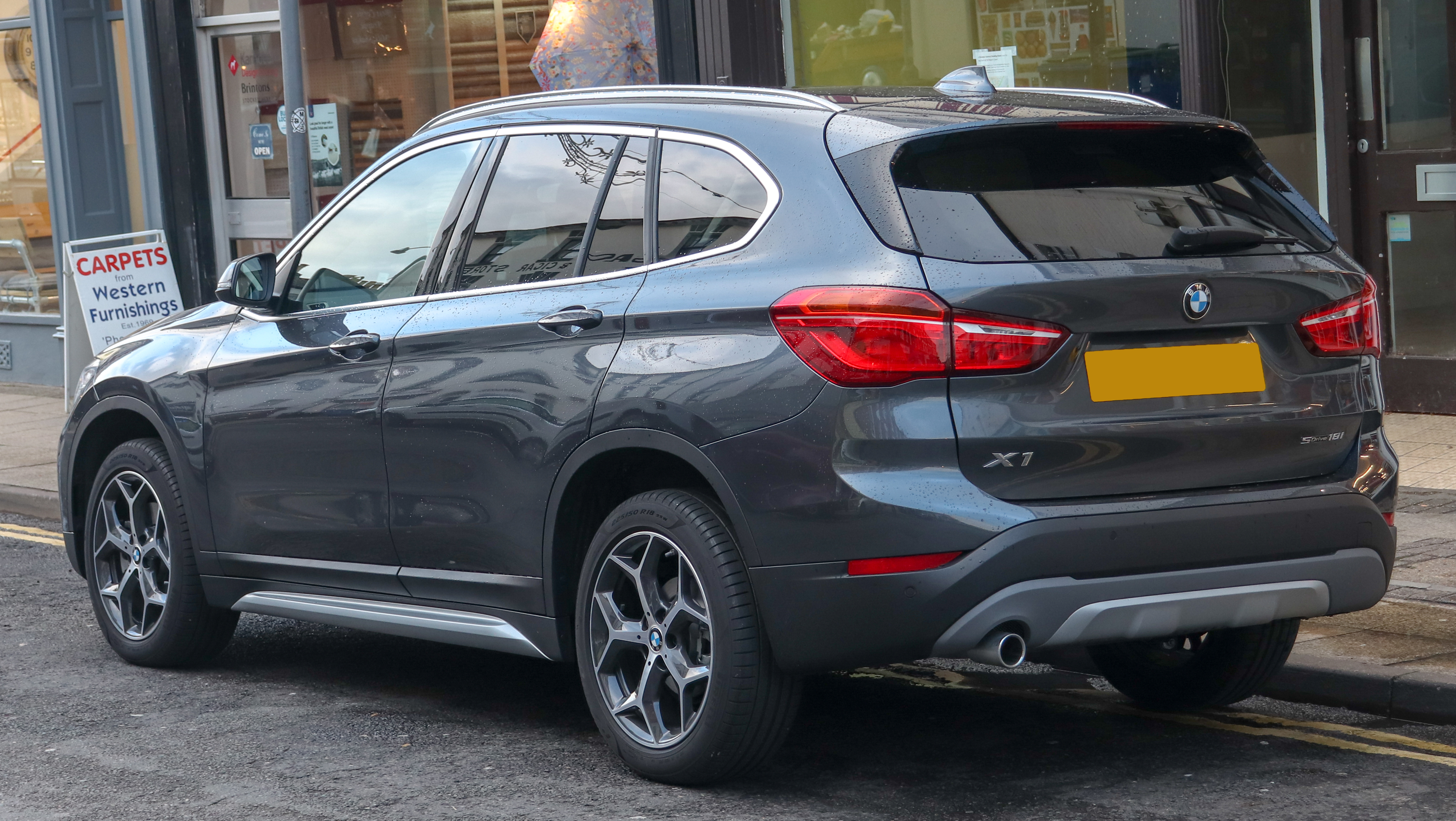
BMW X1 sDrive18i (rear)

BMW sDrive is a single axle drive architecture that is purpose-built for sport-utility vehicles. Introduced in 2013 by German automaker BMW as an option for the 2014 BMW X5 (F15), sDrive uses torque-vectoring and displacement mechanisms that optimise agility and efficiency. Today, sDrive is available on all of BMW's utility vehicles, from the X1 through X7.

Prior to the introduction of sDrive, the majority of monocoque SUVs came with all-wheel drive, four-wheel drive, or front-wheel drive. The two-wheel drive systems present at the time were generally purpose-built for car applications in terms of handling and durability. Rear-wheel drive was generally only seen on body-on-frame vehicles such as pickup trucks and large SUVs. Prior to the F15 X5, all BMW SUVs came standard with BMW xDrive, the company's symmetric all-wheel drive system. These vehicles proved popular to general consumers but lacked the drivability and steering preciseness of the company's sedans and sports cars. The development of sDrive took approximately eight years, and the internal architecture primarily took cues from BMW's sedan rear-wheel drive over xDrive. However, the slip differential needed to be built more substantially to enable the torque-vectoring system on heavier vehicles.

Today, sDrive is a popular option on BMW's SUVs. Nearly 35% of all SUVs sold in North America are optioned with sDrive. Many journalists have compared sDrive's agility to be similar to BMW's smaller sedans, particularly in the case of the BMW X3 (G01).
