= BMW 4 Series =

Compact executive car manufactured by BMW

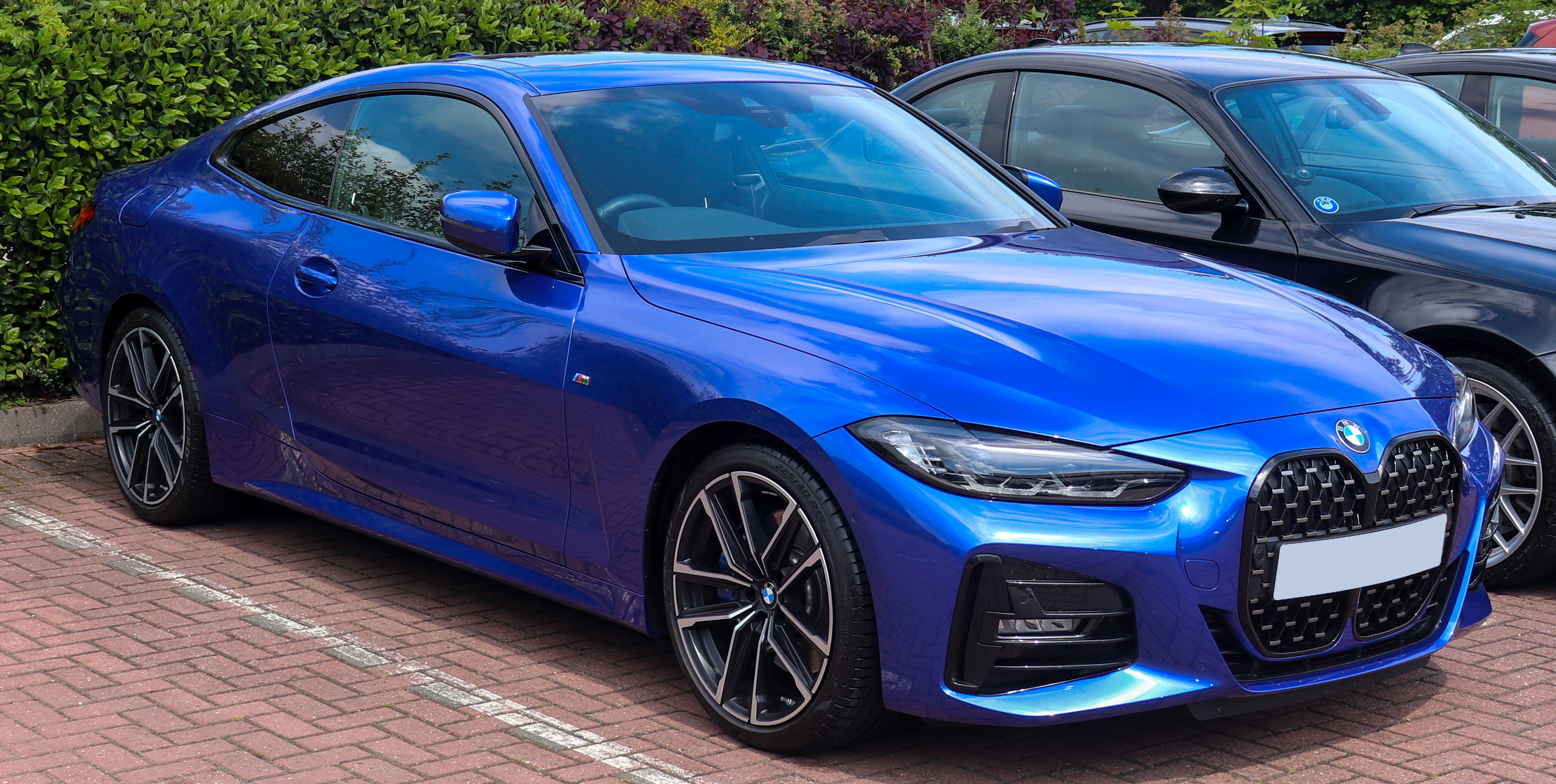
- BMW 4 Series (G22)

Overview
- Manufacturer: BMW
- Production: 2014–present

Body and chassis
- Class: Compact executive car (D)
- Body style: 2-door coupé; 2-door convertible; 5-door liftback/fastback (Gran Coupé)
- Layout: Front-engine, rear-wheel-drive; Front-engine, all-wheel-drive (xDrive)
- Related: BMW 3 Series

Chronology
- Predecessor: BMW 3 Series (E92/E93)

The BMW 4 Series is a range of compact executive cars manufactured by BMW since 2013. The 4 Series was created when BMW spun off the 2-door models (coupé and convertible) of the 3 Series into a separate series. The 4 Series is currently in its second generation.

The original 4 Series concept car was unveiled in January 2013 at the North American International Auto Show in Detroit, Michigan. Both generations have been produced in the coupé, convertible and 5-door liftback (marketed as "Gran Coupé") body styles. The 4 series body style is very similar to that of the all electric BMW i4.

The engines available for the first generation were turbocharged inline-3, inline-4 and inline-6 engines fueled by petrol or diesel. For the second generation, a plug-in hybrid powertrain was introduced. As per the equivalent 3 Series generations, the 4 Series' drivetrain layout is rear-wheel drive or all-wheel drive ("xDrive").

The BMW M4 is the high-performance version of the 4 Series. The first generation of the M4 is called the F82/F83 and uses the same turbocharged inline-six petrol engine as the F80 M3.

== First generation (F32/F33/F36; 2013) ==
The first generation of the 4 Series consists of the following body styles:

- 2-door coupé (F32 model code)
- 2-door convertible (F33 model code)
- 4-door liftback (F36 model code; marketed as the 4 Series Gran Coupé)

This generation was produced from 2014 to 2020 and is often collectively referred to as the F32. The F32 was introduced as the successor to the E92/E93 coupé/convertible models of the fifth-generation 3 Series range. The F32 is produced alongside - and shares many features with - the F30 3 Series. As with the F30 3 Series range, the F32/F33/F36 is powered by turbocharged petrol and diesel engines with 3 cylinders (petrol only), 4 cylinders, and 6 cylinders.

The high performance F82/F83 M4 models were introduced in early 2014. They are powered by the S55 turbocharged straight-six engine.

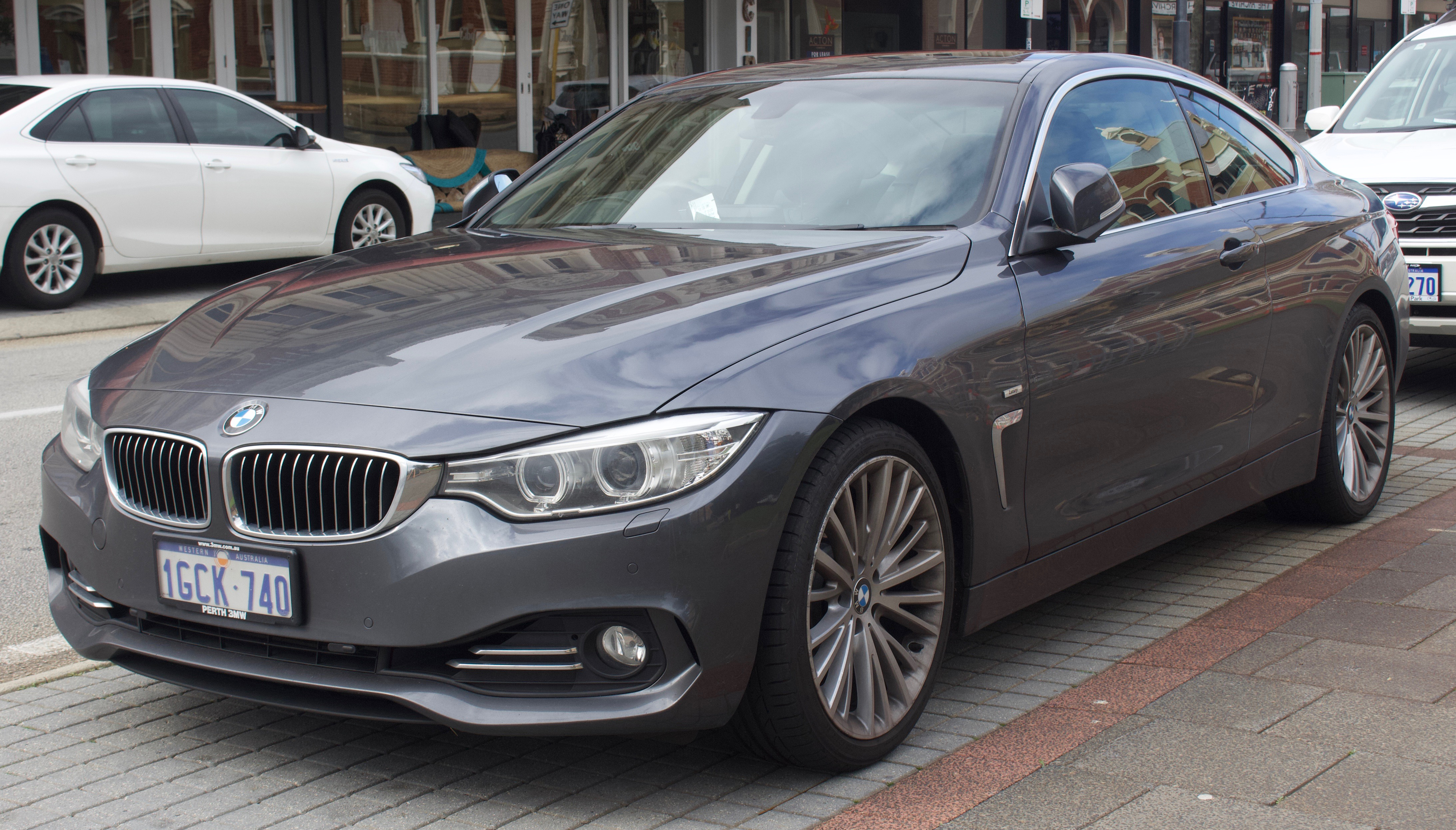
BMW 4 Series coupé (F32)

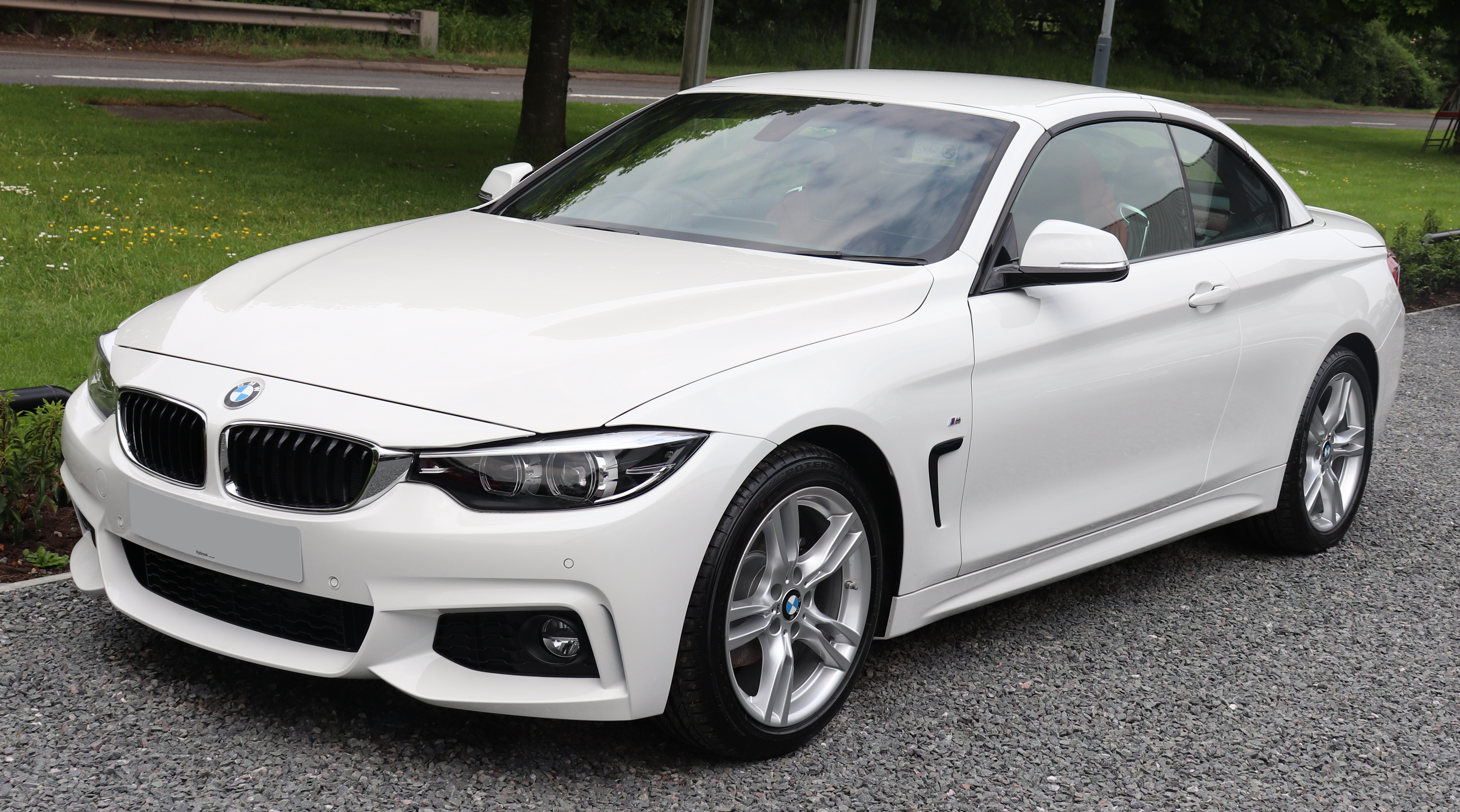
BMW 4 Series convertible (F33)

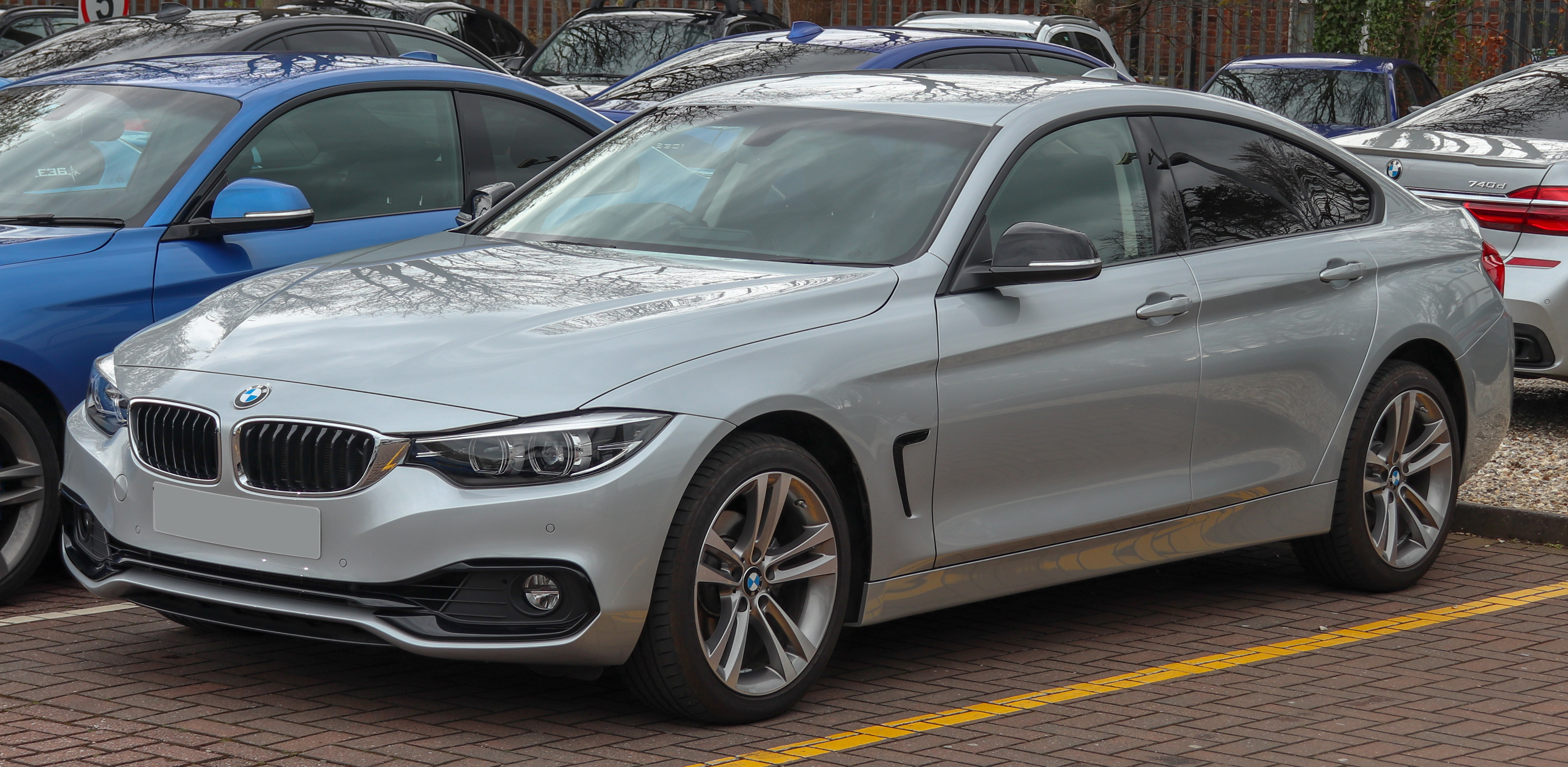
BMW 4 Series Gran Coupé (F36)

== Second generation (G22/G23/G26; 2020) ==
The second generation of the 4 Series consists of the following body styles:

- 2-door coupé (G22 model code)
- 2-door convertible (G23 model code)
- 5-door liftback (G26 model code; marketed as the 4 Series Gran Coupé)

This generation was launched in June 2020 and is currently in production. The G22/G23/G26 will be produced alongside - and shares many features with - the G20 3 Series. As with the G20 3 Series range, the G22/G23/G26 will be powered by turbocharged petrol and diesel engines.

Unlike its predecessor, the new 4 Series has a significant difference in appearance from the 3 Series, to distinguish between the two models and to move the 4 Series upscale. The most notable design change is the large kidney grille at the front, reportedly inspired by the 1930s BMW 328.

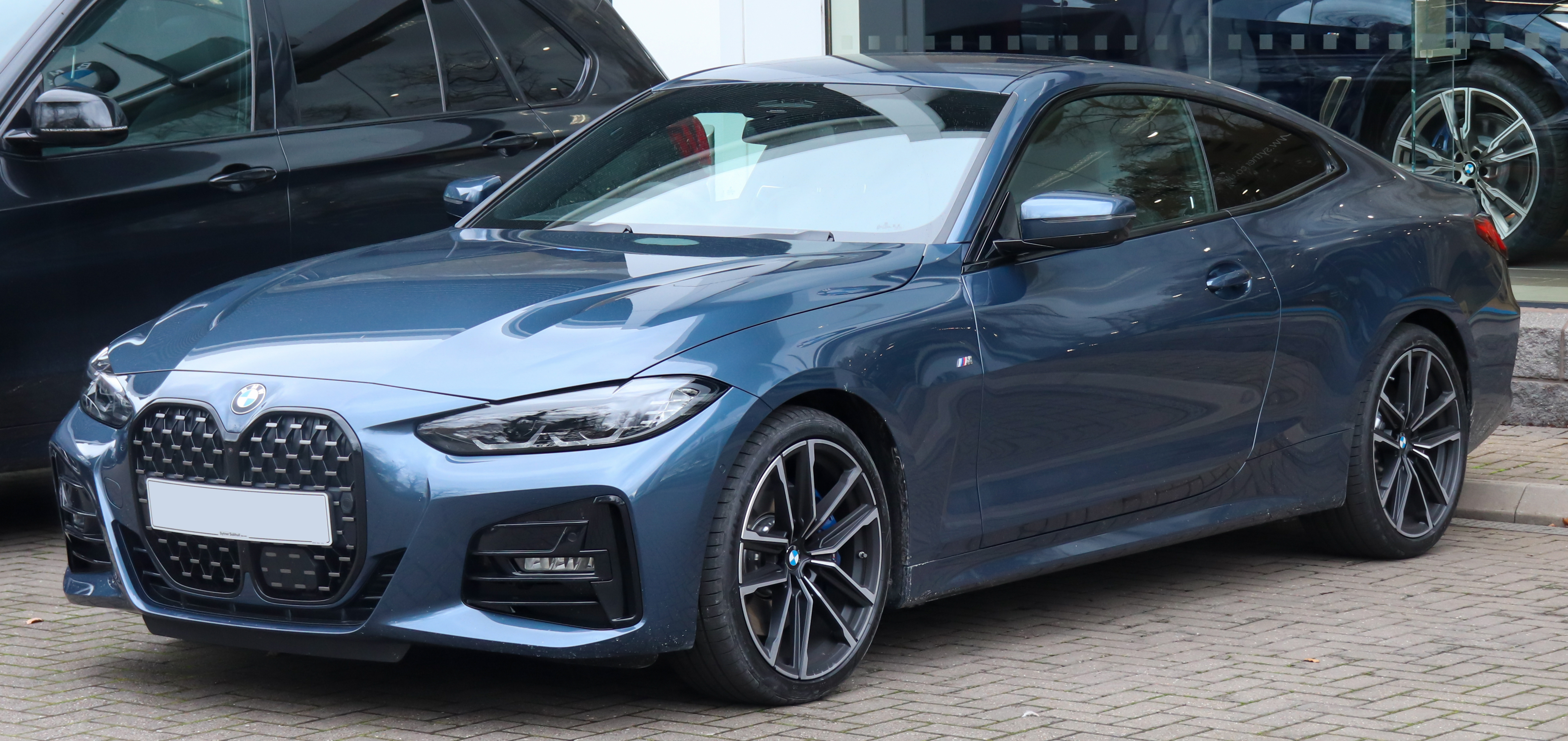
BMW 4 Series coupé (G22)

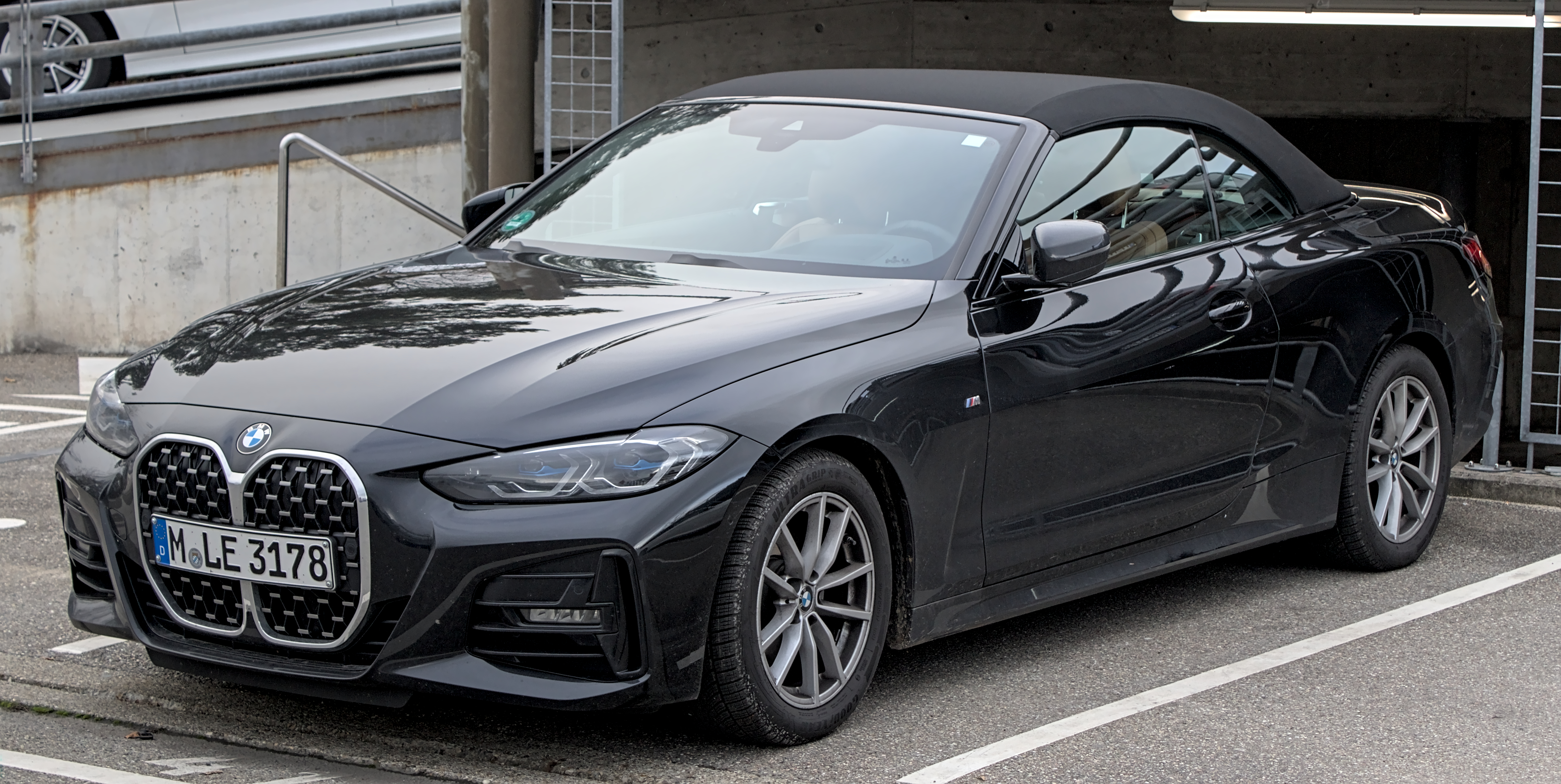
BMW 4 Series convertible (G23)

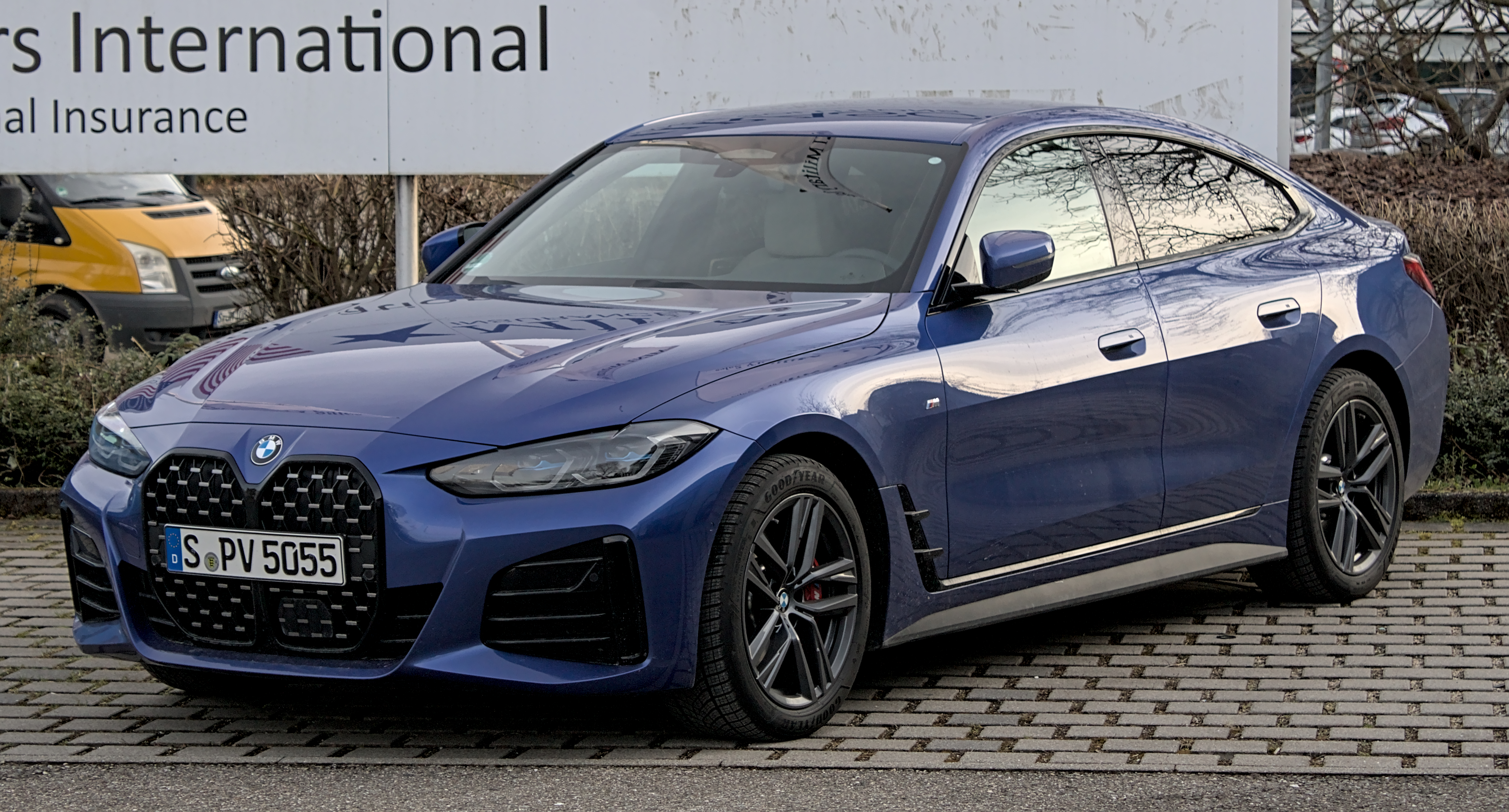
BMW 4 Series Gran Coupé (G26)

== Awards ==
In January 2021, the BMW 420i M Sport (M Sport Pro Package) was named "Coupé of the Year" by What Car? magazine. What Car? awarded the 4 Series Coupé five stars out of five in its review of the car.

== Sales ==
Year	China			US	
Year	4-series	M4	i4	Total	i4
2022				36,954	
2023	20,214	1,125	2,140	50,777	22,583
2024	17,732	962	2,356	42,608	23,403
2025	16,599	1,373	1,495	39,379	20,114

== See also ==
- List of BMW vehicles
