= BMW X5 (G65) =

Fifth generation of the BMW X5

- BMW iX5

Overview
- Manufacturer: BMW
- Model code: G65; G78 (LWB)
- Production: August 2026 – present
- Model years: 2027
- Assembly: United States: Spartanburg County, South Carolina (BMW Plant Spartanburg); China: Dadong, Shenyang (BBA, LWB)

Body and chassis
- Class: Mid-size luxury crossover SUV
- Body style: 5-door SUV
- Layout: Front-engine, all-wheel-drive (xDrive) Front-engine, rear-wheel-drive (sDrive) (North America only); Dual-motor, all-wheel-drive (iX5 Electric); Rear motor, rear-wheel drive (iX5 Hydrogen)
- Platform: Cluster Architecture (CLAR)

Powertrain
- Engine: Petrol: 3.0 L B58 turbo I6; Petrol plug-in hybrid: 3.0 L B58 turbo I6; Diesel: 3.0 L B57 turbo I6
- Electric motor: Fuel cell-powered (iX5 Hydrogen)
- Power output: 294 kW (394 hp; 400 PS) (X5 40); 230 kW (308 hp; 313 PS) (X5 40d); 360 kW (483 hp; 489 PS) (X5 50e); 450 kW (603 hp; 612 PS) (X5 M60e); 425 kW (570 hp; 578 PS) (iX5 60)
- Transmission: 8-speed ZF 8HP Steptronic automatic
- Hybrid drivetrain: Mild hybrid Plug-in hybrid
- Battery: 29.5 kWh Li-ion (PHEV); 144 kWh NMC (North America); 141 kWh NMC (Europe)

Dimensions
- Wheelbase: 3,035 mm (119.5 in); 3,165 mm (124.6 in) (G78)
- Length: 4,994 mm (196.6 in); 5,141 mm (202.4 in) (G78)
- Width: 2,000 mm (78.7 in)
- Height: 1,748–1,751 mm (68.8–68.9 in)
- Curb weight: 2,365–2,900 kg (5,214–6,393 lb)

Chronology
- Predecessor: BMW X5 (G05); BMW iX (iX5)

The G65 BMW X5 is a mid-size luxury crossover SUV produced by German automaker BMW. It is the fifth generation of the BMW X5 and succeeds the G05 X5. The G65 is the first X5 to receive a battery electric variant, named the iX5. The long-wheelbase G78 is exclusive to the Chinese market.

== Overview ==
The X5 adopts design elements and technologies from BMW's Neue Klasse generation vehicles, though unlike some other Neue Klasse models, it does not use the new dedicated platform and instead retains the Cluster Architecture (CLAR) platform from the previous generation.

A radical new exterior design language is used, with small kidney grilles and a monolithic body similar to the NA5 iX3, as well as new X-shaped daytime running lights. The interior also takes after other Neue Klasse models, with a setup running on iDrive X, including the Panoramic Vision display, a 3D Head-Up display, a large central display and a passenger display.

The G65 X5 is the first X5 generation to not feature a split tailgate. According to BMW, this change was due to the slightly sloped roofline which reduced the overall height of the tailgate, while the lower part of the split tailgate previously made it difficulty for consumers to reach into the cargo area when loading and unloading items. In addition, the G65 X5 is also no longer offered with a third-row seating option, making it strictly a five-seater vehicle.

BMW has revealed that the G65 X5 will feature five powertrain types - diesel, battery electric, gasoline, hydrogen and plug-in hybrid. So far, it is revealed that the iX5 60 xDrive features a 144 kWh (North America) or 141 kWh (Europe) battery with cylindrical cells, the largest BMW has ever used. It has a WLTP range of 845 km (525 mi) with charging speeds up to 460 kW. It is also built on an 800-volt architecture and uses BMW's sixth generation eDrive technology.

Rear view

Interior

== BMW X5 L / iX5 L (G78) ==
A China-only long-wheelbase variant of the G65 X5, codenamed G78, was officially unveiled on 27 July 2026.

Compared to the G65, the G78 features an additional design accents on the D-pillar in the shape of the Hofmeister kink, as well as an additional camera mounted on the roof spoiler.

The interior features additional color options and a 31.3-inch 8K theater screen carried over from the G70 7-Series.

The G78 X5 has a claimed range of 1,000 km (620 mi) on the CLTC cycle.
