= Xdrive =

Xdrive may refer to:

- BMW xDrive, a vehiclev all-wheel-drive system
- Xdrive (website), acquired by AOL then closed in 2008
