= BMW X1 =

Line of subcompact luxury crossovers

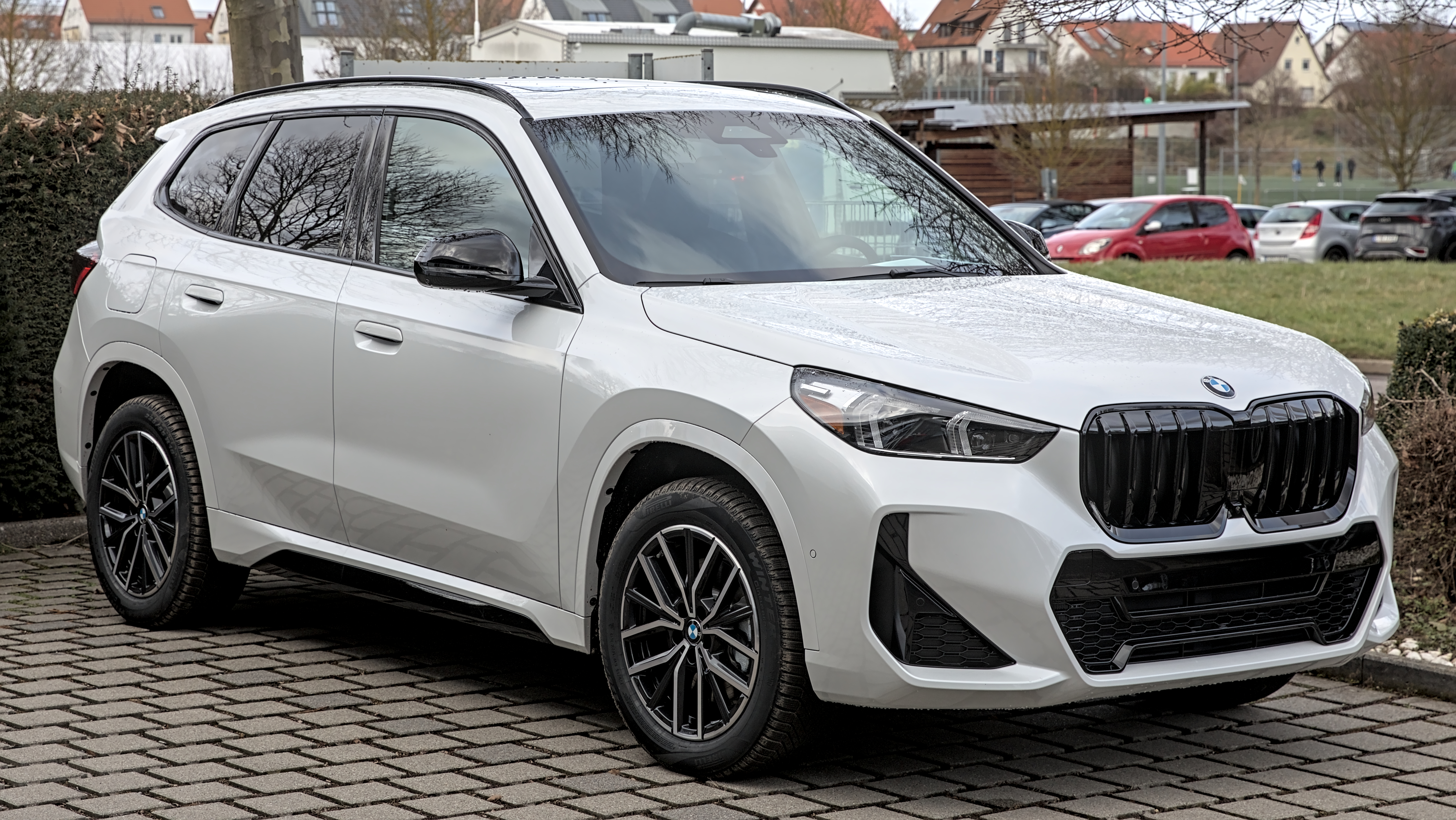
- BMW X1 (U11)

Overview
- Manufacturer: BMW
- Production: 2009–present

Body and chassis
- Class: Subcompact luxury crossover SUV
- Body style: 5-door SUV
- Layout: Front-engine, rear-wheel-drive (E84); Front-engine, front-wheel-drive (F48 and U11); Front-engine, all-wheel-drive (xDrive); Dual-motors, all-wheel-drive (iX1)

The BMW X1 is a line of cars produced by German marque BMW since 2009. It is in the subcompact luxury crossover class, and the first-generation X1 was based on the E90 3 Series and offered rear-wheel drive layout as standard. The X1 essentially is aiming at a wider range of customers due to its smaller size, increased efficiency, and a lower price tag due to the all-wheel drive layout (xDrive) being optional.

The second-generation X1 introduced a plug-in hybrid option and marked the switch to a front-wheel-drive-based layout using the UKL2 platform shared with the BMW 2 Series Active Tourer and the Mini Countryman. Despite its name, it is now only the second smallest SUV produced by BMW since the introduction of the X2.

The third and current generation was released in 2022 and introduced a mild hybrid powertrain.

== First generation (E84; 2009) ==
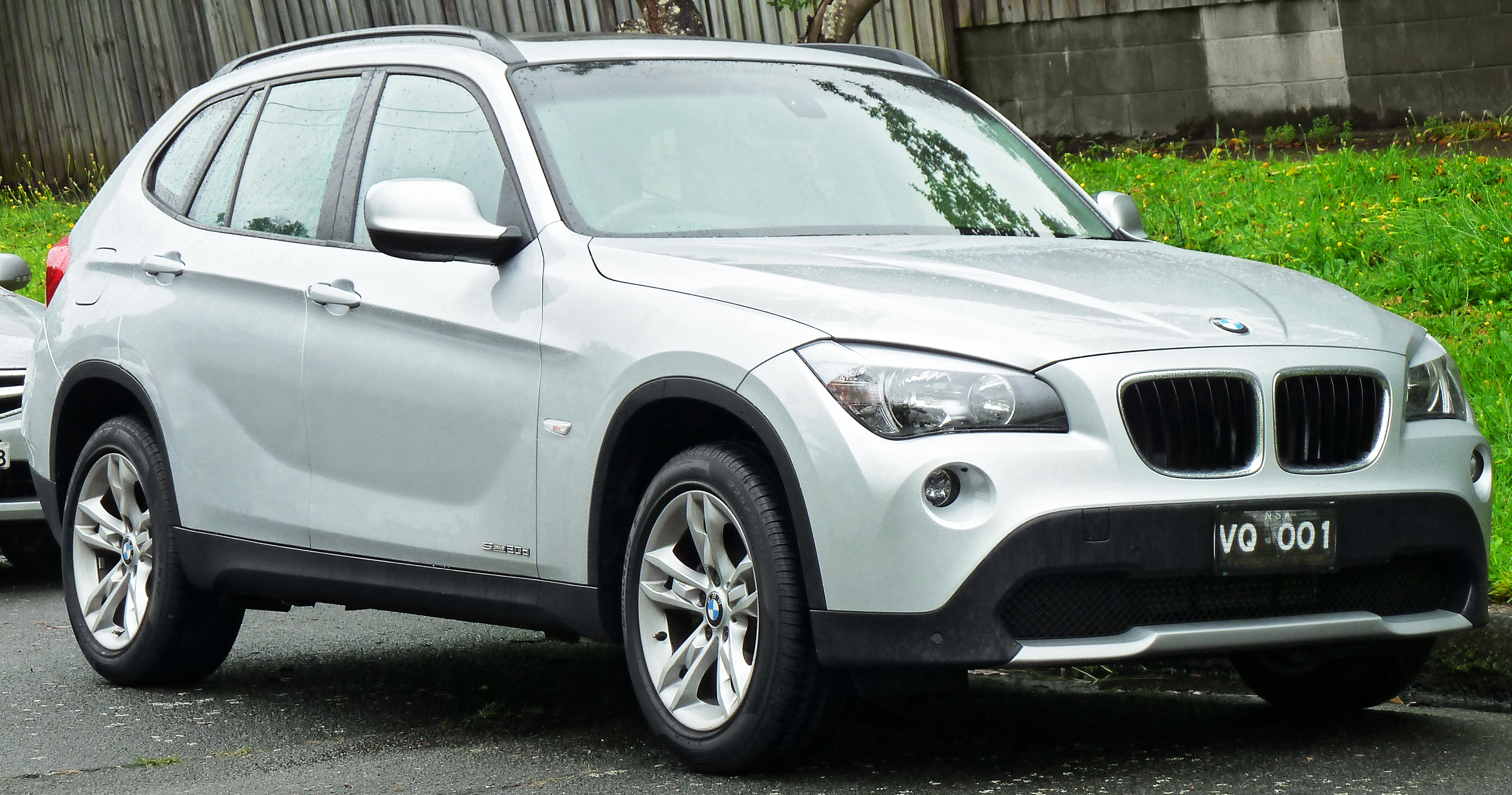
BMW X1 (E84)

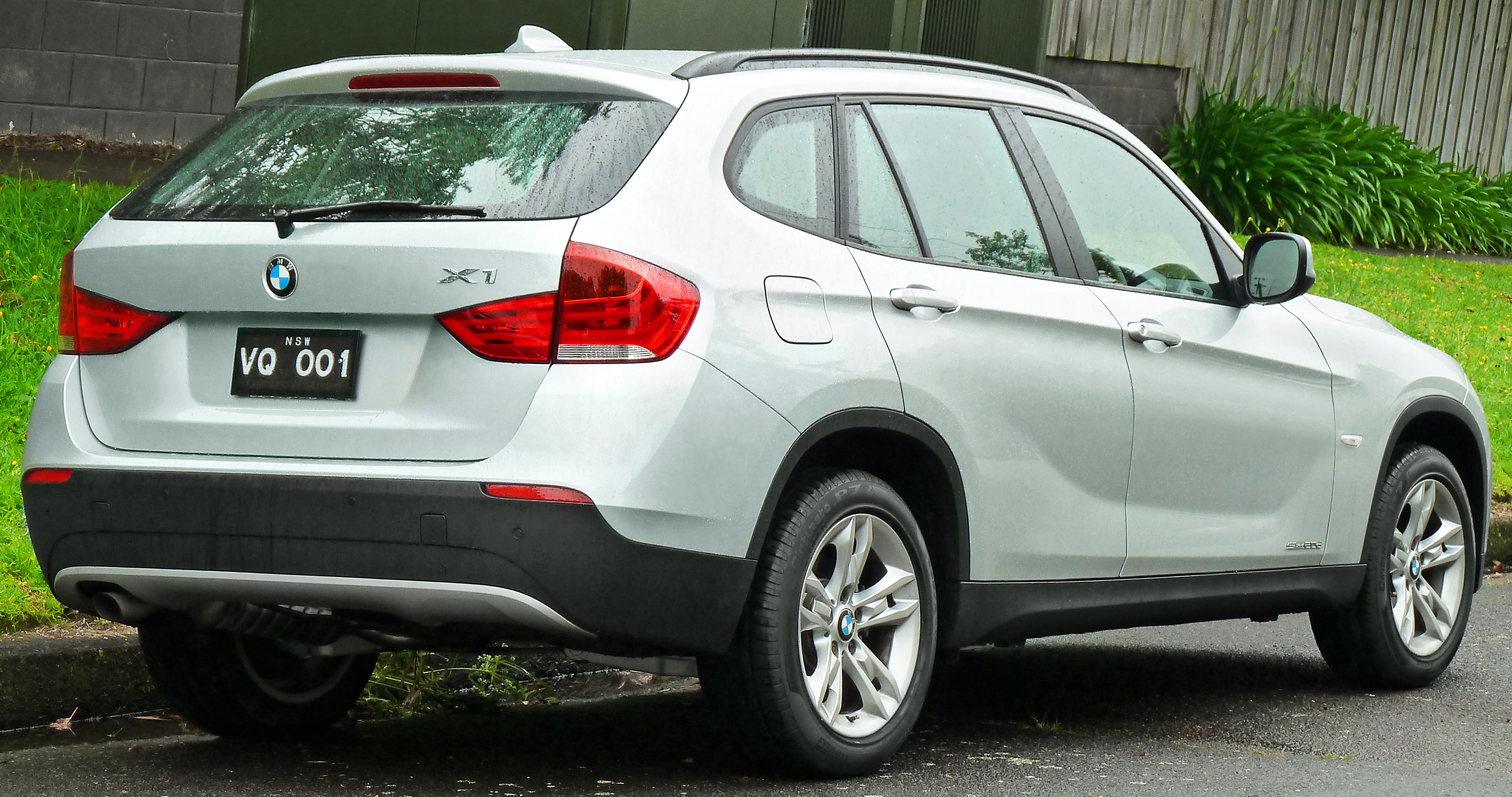
BMW X1 (E84)

The E84 X1 is the first-generation model and was originally presented as the BMW Concept X1 at the Paris Motor Show in 2008. Development of the vehicle started in 2006 when BMW identified the need for a smaller and more efficient model in its SUV line-up as petrol prices were increasing. Due to the urgent need to produce the vehicle, development and pre-production time was shortened by 40 percent compared to previous X Series models.

It is based on the same platform as the E90 3 Series and features the same 2,760 mm (108.7 in) wheelbase. The X1 is the first BMW X Series to be available in the sDrive trim (two-wheel drive). It was not introduced to the United States until 2012.

In 2013, the E84 X1 underwent a facelift, featuring restyled exterior and interior design elements, as well as the integration of BMW EfficientDynamics on all models. The original X1 sold 820,529 units.

== Second generation (F48/F49; 2016) ==
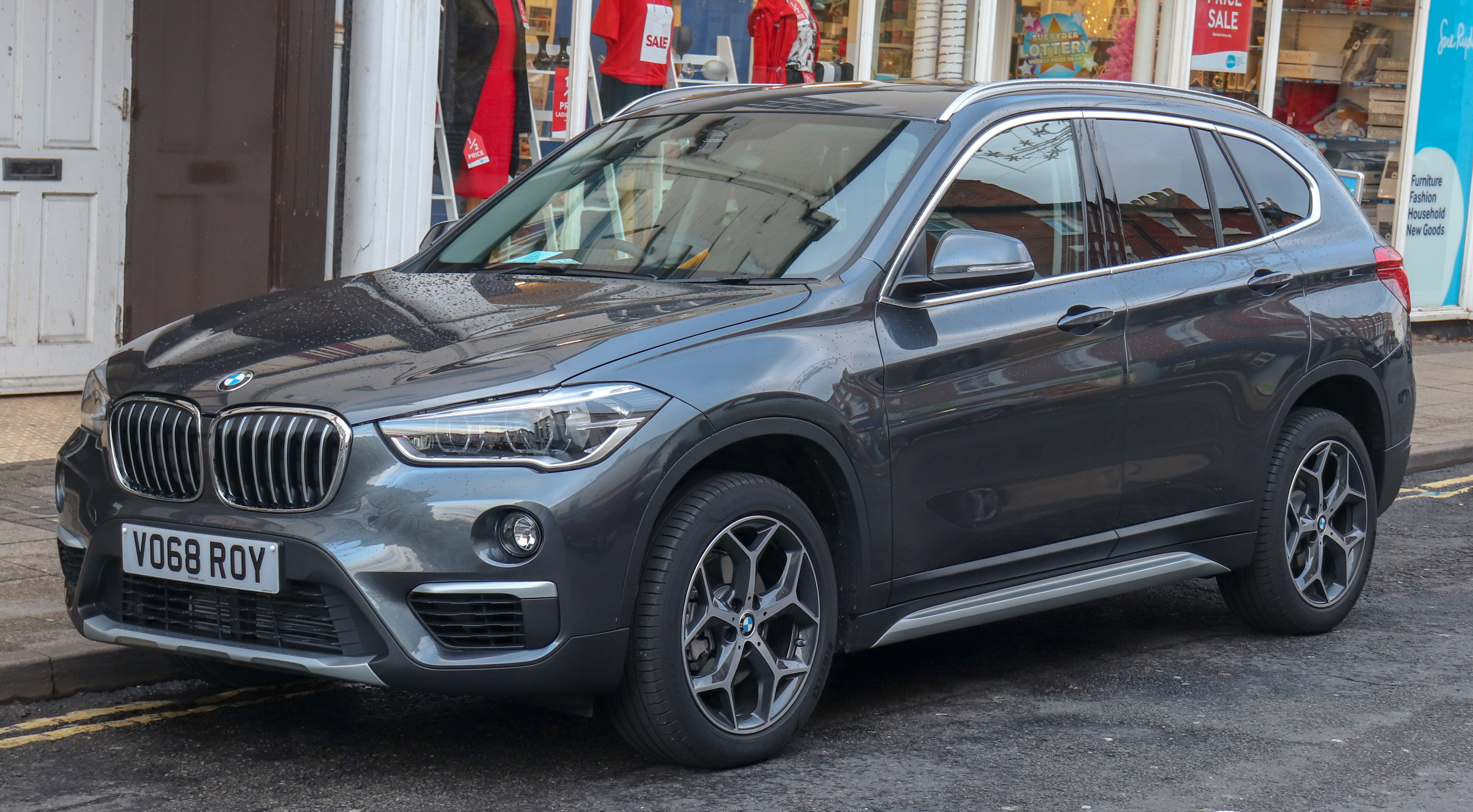
BMW X1 (F48)

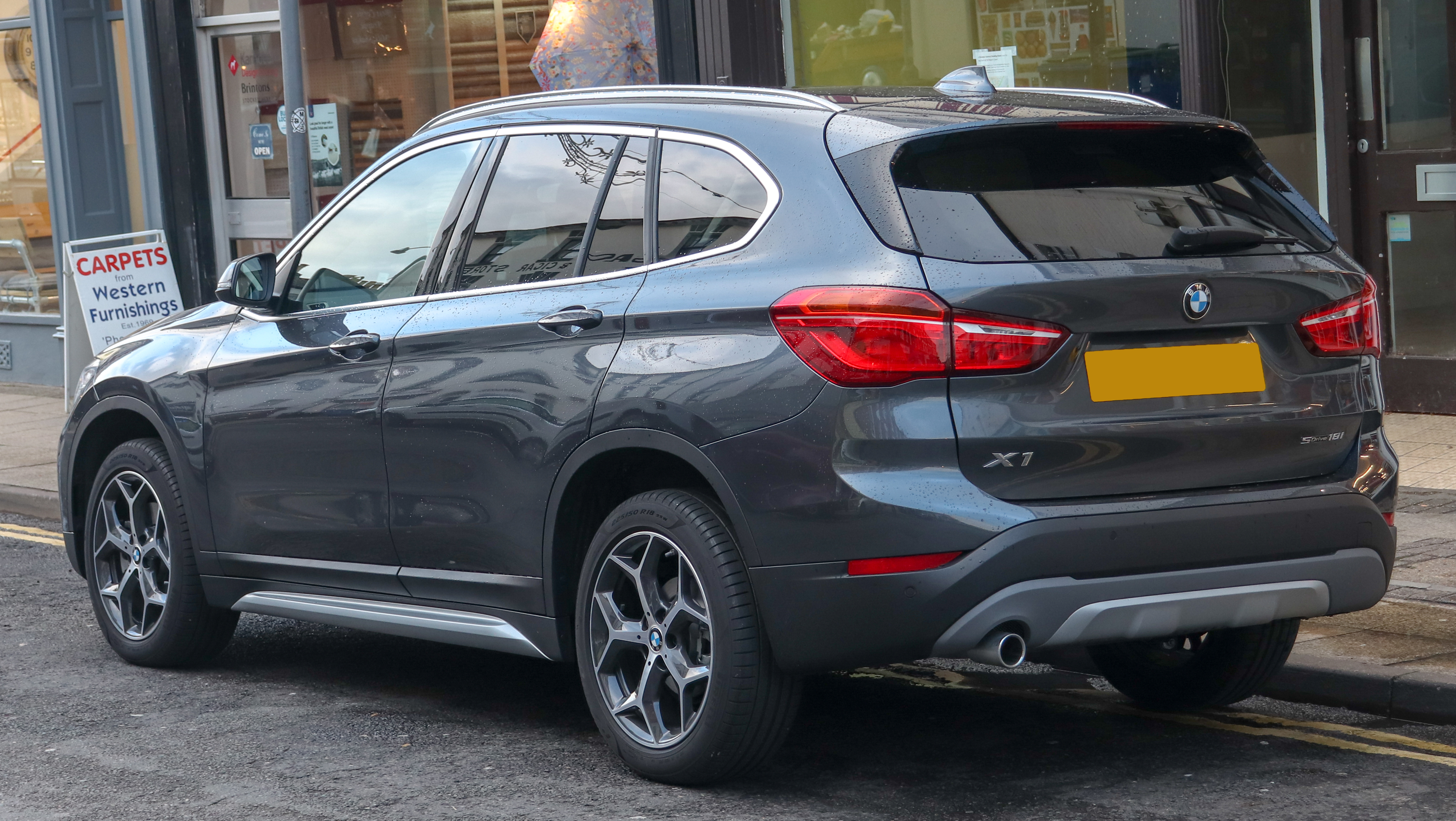
BMW X1 (F48)

The F48 X1 is the second-generation model. It is built upon the front-wheel drive based UKL2 platform, and is available in long-wheelbase and long-wheelbase hybrid variants in China. The range consists of turbocharged 3-cylinder and 4-cylinder petrol and diesel engine options. Base models are front-wheel drive (branded as sDrive), with all-wheel drive (xDrive) available as an option and is standard for some higher-end models.

== Third generation (U11/U12; 2022) ==
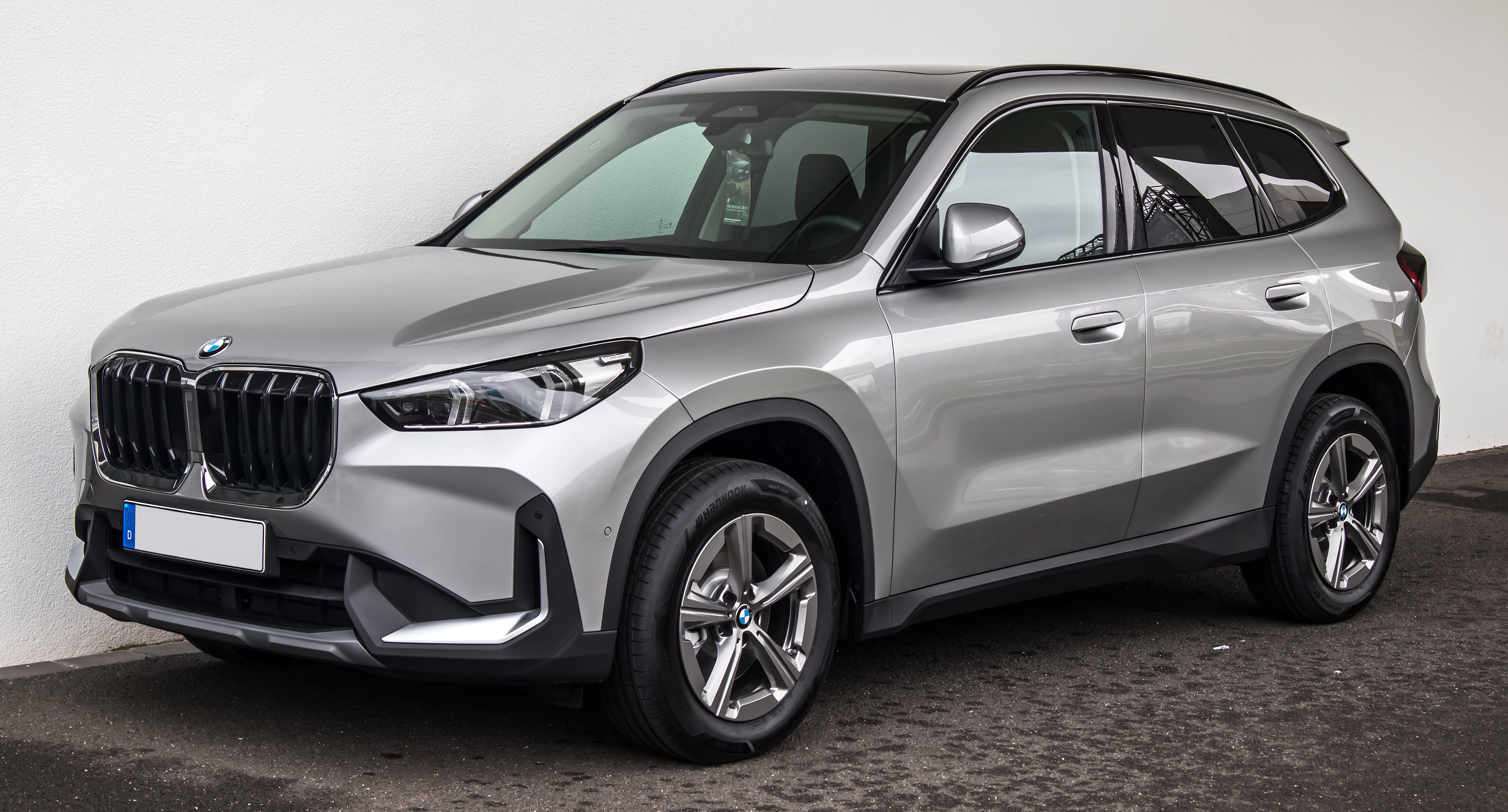
BMW X1 (U11)

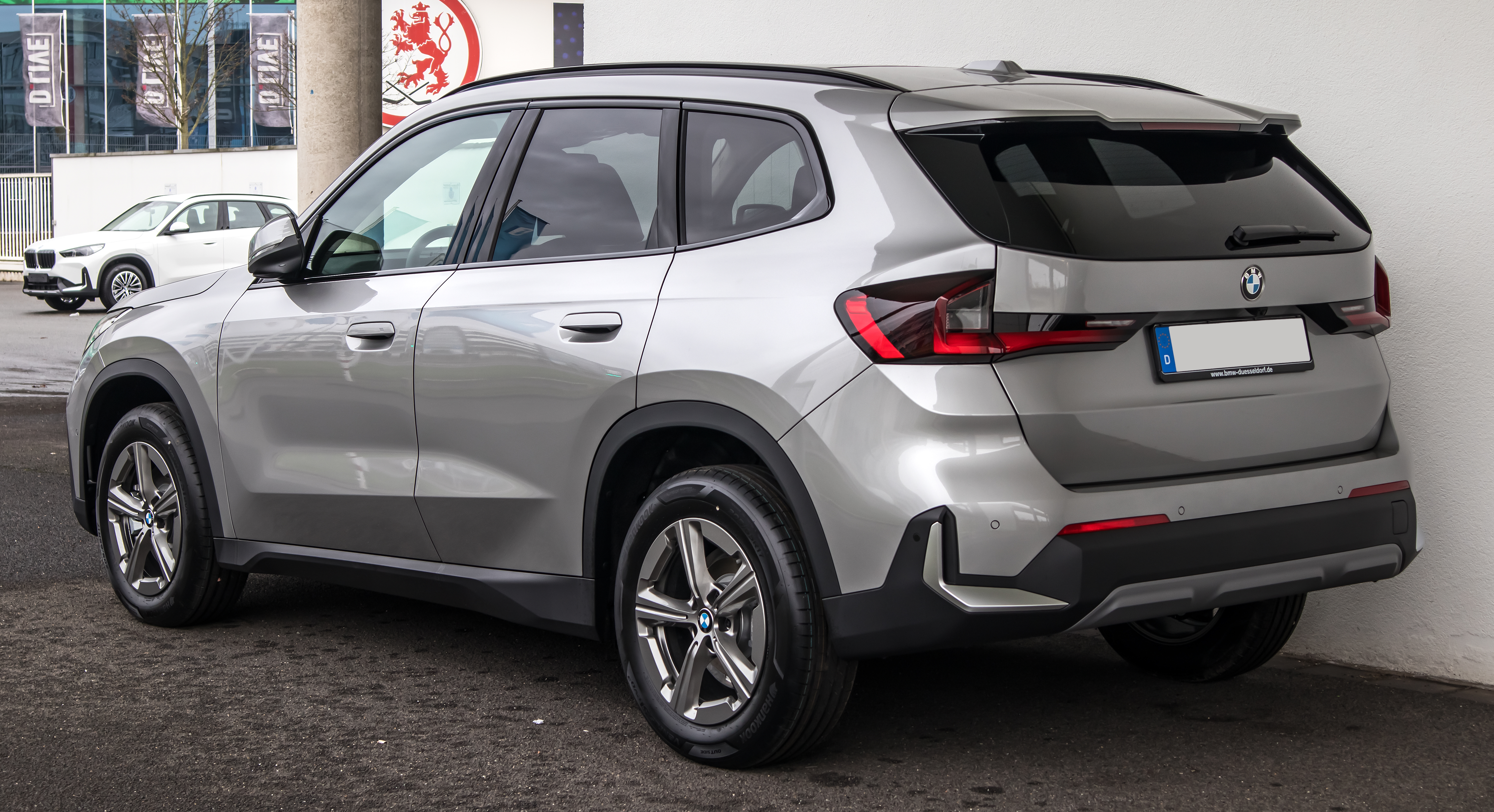
BMW X1 (U11)

The U11 X1 is the third-generation model. It is built on the same UKL2 platform as the previous model, and now has a battery electric version called the iX1. Similar to the previous generation, AWD models are badged as xDrive. A range of petrol, diesel, and PHEV models are available. Like the previous model, a China-exclusive long-wheelbase model is codenamed U12.

On August 21, 2026, BMW launched the X1 Long Wheelbase (sDrive18i M Sport) in India priced at ₹49.90 lakh. Offered solely with a 156 hp 1.5-litre petrol engine, it features a 108 mm extended wheelbase to enhance rear-seat comfort.

== Production and sales ==
The following are the production and sales figures for BMW X1 models:

Year	Production	Sales								
Year	Production	Europe	U.S.	China		Brazil	Malaysia (Note: Figures based on registration (Malaysia))		Indonesia	
Year	Production	Europe	U.S.	X1	iX1	Brazil	X1	iX1	X1	iX1
2009	8,499	8,925			—		—	—	—	—
2010	99,990	77,706			—	1,821	183	—	97	—
2011	126,429	83,086			—	4,560	438	—	218	—
2012	147,776	65,254	8,947	18,798	—	2,625	377	—	385	—
2013	161,353	64,313	26,512	22,913	—	2,730	521	—	453	—
2014	156,471	61,797	22,808	46,563	—	2,170	516	—	261	—
2015	120,011	42,107	14,420	41,200	—	2,711	280	—	150	—
2016	220,378	95,380	27,812	54,900	—	3,440	748	—	450	—
2017	286,743	118,051	30,826	90,574	—	4,137	1,113	—	868	—
2018	286,827	111,496	29,060	97,215	—	3,735	1,177	—	755	—
2019	266,124	108,507	17,815	97,364	—	4,254	1,400	—	660	—
2020	230,041	88,486	14,405	95,096	—	3,168	1,032	—	320	—
2021	N/A (Note: Starting in 2021, BMW Group combined total deliveries of the X1 and X2 in its annual report.)	86,749	18,253	95,089	—	3,607	1,094	—	699	—
2022	N/A		7,103			3,480	1,097	—	318	—
2023	N/A		21,042	77,920	1,529	3,983	496	617	338	—
2024	N/A		27,306	82,751	13,142	4,859	1,497	285	647	296
2025	N/A		27,386	49,616	12,346	5,368	1,267	279	174	173

== See also ==
- List of BMW vehicles
