= BMW R25 =

Motorbike made by BMW

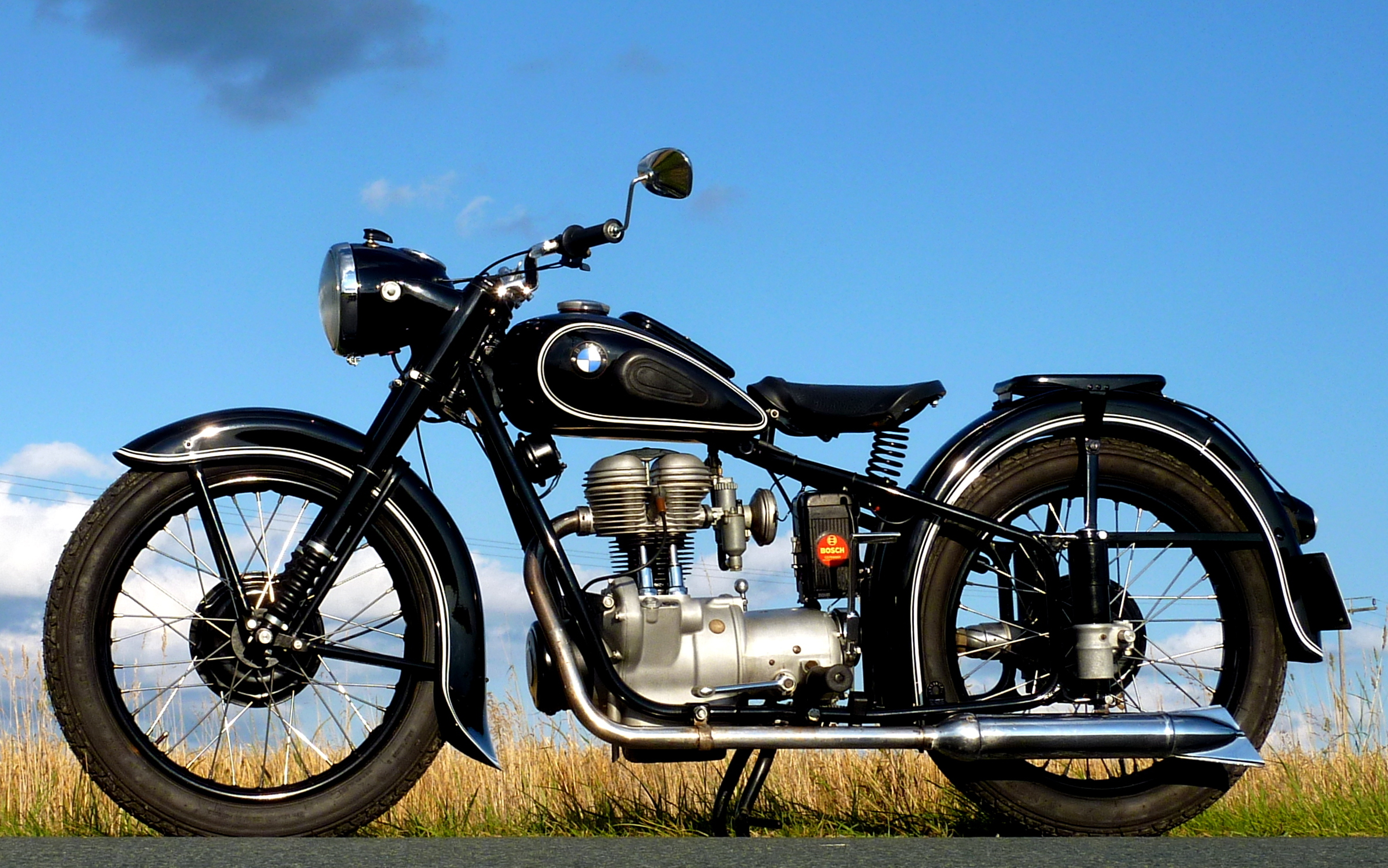

The BMW R25, manufactured by BMW, was a motorcycle featuring a single-cylinder in-line engine. Production began in early 1950 and concluded in 1951. A total of 23,400 units of this model were produced.
