= David Robb (motorcycling) =

- Born: Boston, Massachusetts, US
- Employer(s): Chrysler, Audi, BMW, BMW Motorrad
- Known for: Chief designer of BMW Motorrad, 1993–2012

David Robb, born 1956 in Boston, Massachusetts, USA, is a vehicle designer best known for his work as chief designer at BMW Motorrad, BMW's motorcycle division, from 1993 to 2012.

Robb was trained in design at the Art Center College of Design in Pasadena, California. After graduating he worked for Chrysler in the US, and Audi in Germany, before joining BMW's car division in 1984.

At BMW Motorrad Robb was responsible for designing, or led the design of the K1200RS sport bike, the R1200 which is a cruiser; the C1, which is an enclosed scooter; the K1200R, a powerful naked bike; the F800S, F800ST, F800R, and F800GS, all of which share the same 800 cc parallel-twin engine; the R1200GS, a dual-sport motorcycle which is BMW Motorrad's best selling model, and the S1000RR sport bike which is sold as a road bike and is also raced in the Superbike World Championship.

== Personal life ==
Robb grew up in Kobe, Japan, where his father was a missionary. Robb's brother Doug is lead vocalist and rhythm guitarist for the American rock band Hoobastank, and his brother Tom has worked as a bodyguard for Metallica.
