= Concept F 450 GS =

Concept adventure motorcycle by BMW Motorrad

BMW Concept F 450 GS
- Manufacturer: BMW Motorrad
- Production: Concept model only (2024)
- Predecessor: BMW G450X
- Successor: BMW F450GS
- Class: Dual-sport / Adventure motorcycle
- Engine: 420 cc (26 cu in) liquid-cooled parallel-twin
- Power: 35 kW (47 hp) (claimed)
- Torque: 43 N⋅m (32 lb⋅ft) (claimed)
- Frame type: Steel bridge frame (prototype)
- Suspension: Front: inverted telescopic fork Rear: monoshock
- Brakes: Front and rear disc
- Tires: Front: 90/90-21; Rear: 140/80-17
- Seat height: 860 mm (33.9 in) (estimated)
- Weight: 175 kg (386 lb) (target) (dry)
- Related: BMW F450GS · BMW F750GS

The BMW Concept F 450 GS is a prototype dual-sport motorcycle developed by BMW Motorrad. It was unveiled in November 2024 at the EICMA motorcycle show in Milan, Italy, previewing the production F 450 GS that followed one year later.

== Overview ==
The Concept F 450 GS represented BMW’s return to the small-displacement adventure segment below 500 cc. It introduced a new 420 cc parallel-twin engine rated for 35 kW (47 hp), making it suitable for the European A2 licence category.

The concept was shown with a minimalist steel bridge frame, long-travel suspension, 21-inch front and 17-inch rear wheels, and styling inspired by the larger R 1300 GS and F 800 GS.

== Design ==
The prototype featured LED lighting with a distinctive “X”-shaped daytime running light, a TFT display, and a focus on lightweight construction, with BMW quoting a target dry weight of 175 kg (386 lb). Its bright yellow and grey paintwork reflected BMW’s current GS design language.

== Development ==
BMW stated that the concept closely previewed a forthcoming production model aimed at new riders and emerging markets. The production version, unveiled in November 2025 as the BMW F450GS, retained the twin-cylinder engine, chassis layout, and styling cues from the concept, adding rider-assistance systems such as ABS Pro and Dynamic Brake Control.

== Reception ==
Motorcycle journalists described the Concept F 450 GS as an accessible, modern take on the “baby GS,” bridging the gap between the entry-level G 310 GS and the mid-size F 800 GS.

== See also ==
- BMW Motorrad
- BMW F450GS
- BMW GS
- BMW G310GS
