= BMW F450GS =

Dual-sport motorcycle from BMW Motorrad

BMW F 450 GS
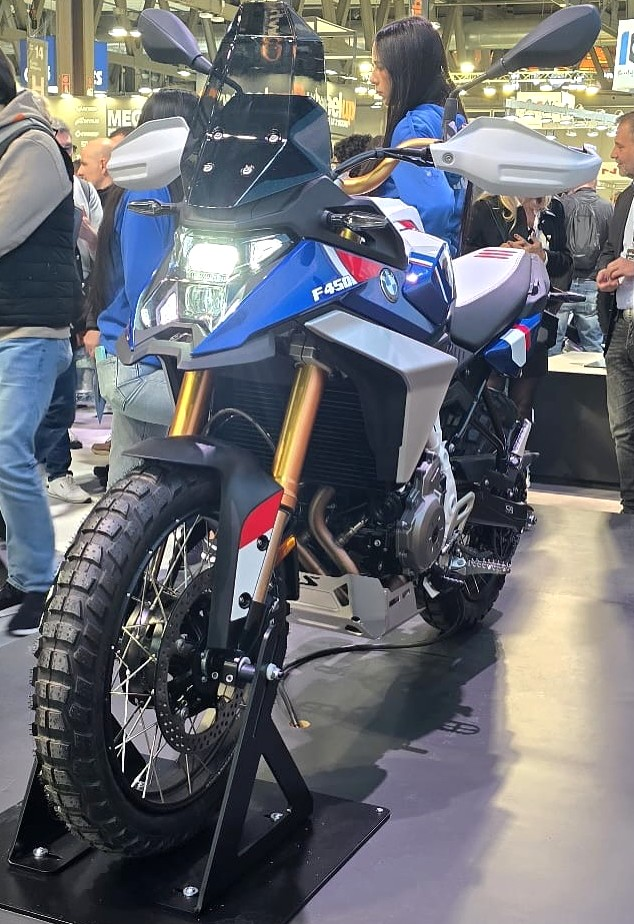
- BMW F 450 GS at EICMA 2025
- Manufacturer: BMW Motorrad
- Production: 2025-present
- Assembly: Hosur, Tamil Nadu, India (with TVS Motor Company)
- Predecessor: BMW G450X (spiritual)
- Class: Dual-sport / Adventure motorcycle
- Engine: 420 cc (26 cu in) liquid-cooled parallel-twin
- Power: 35 kW (47 hp) @ 8,750 rpm
- Torque: 43 N⋅m (32 lb⋅ft) @ 6,750 rpm
- Transmission: 6-speed manual; chain final drive
- Frame type: Steel bridge frame
- Suspension: Front: telescopic fork Rear: monoshock
- Brakes: Front: single disc Rear: single disc; with ABS Pro
- Tires: Front: 90/90-21; Rear: 140/80-17
- Seat height: 830 mm (32.7 in) (low); 845 mm (33.3 in) (standard); 865 mm (34.1 in) (rallye)
- Fuel capacity: 13 L (3.4 US gal)
- Related: BMW F750GS · BMW F800GS

The BMW F 450 GS is a dual-sport motorcycle produced by BMW Motorrad. Unveiled in November 2025 at the EICMA motorcycle show in Milan, it serves as the entry point to BMW’s F-series parallel-twin adventure range, positioned between the single-cylinder G 310 GS and the mid-size F 800 GS.

== Background ==
BMW previewed the model line a year earlier with the Concept F 450 GS, shown in November 2024. The concept highlighted a lightweight chassis and premium suspension hardware aimed at broadening GS accessibility in the A2-licence class.

== Design and features ==
The production F 450 GS uses a new 420 cc (26 cu in) liquid-cooled parallel-twin producing 35 kW (47 hp) and 43 N⋅m (32 lb⋅ft), meeting the A2 category power limit while targeting everyday usability on and off road. A 6.5-inch colour TFT display with connectivity, LED lighting including an “X”-signature daytime running light, and rider-assistance features such as ABS Pro and Dynamic Brake Control are fitted or available depending on market.

Some markets also reference BMW’s Easy Ride centrifugal clutch feature to ease pull-away without using the clutch lever on certain variants.

== Chassis ==
The motorcycle employs a steel bridge frame with a telescopic fork and rear monoshock. Wheel sizes are 21-inch front and 17-inch rear, with cast or optional cross-spoke wheels depending on specification. Ready-to-ride mass is quoted at around 178 kg (392 lb) in press materials and early coverage.

== Market and production ==
BMW states that production for global markets will be undertaken with manufacturing partner TVS Motor Company at its Hosur facility in India, alongside the G 310 series. BMW’s U.S. press communication indicates a market launch expected in late Q4 2026 or early Q1 2027, with pricing to be announced closer to that date; earlier on-sale timing is expected in some other regions.

== Reception ==
Early coverage from motorcycle media described the F 450 GS as an overdue “baby GS” designed to bring the GS platform to newer and shorter-statured riders, while retaining the styling and equipment cues of larger GS models.

== See also ==
- BMW Motorrad
- BMW F series parallel-twin
- BMW G310GS
- BMW GS
