= Rotax =

Brand of internal combustion engines

BRP-Rotax GmbH & Co KG
- Type: Private company
- Industry: Mechanical engineering
- Founded: 1920
- Headquarters: Gunskirchen, Upper Austria, Austria
- Products: Internal combustion engines
- Owner: BRP-Powertrain Management GmbH, BRP Holdings (Austria) GmbH
- Parent: Bombardier Recreational Products
- Website: www.rotax.com

Previous logo

Rotax is the brand name for a range of internal combustion engines developed and manufactured by the Austrian company BRP-Rotax GmbH & Co KG (until 2016 BRP-Powertrain GmbH & Co. KG), in turn owned by the Canadian Bombardier Recreational Products (BRP). Under the Rotax brand, the company is one of the world's largest producers of light piston engines.

Rotax four-stroke and advanced two-stroke engines are used in a wide variety of small land, sea and airborne vehicles. Bombardier Recreational Products use them in their own range of such vehicles. Since the 1990s, Rotax has been the world's dominant supplier of engines for ultralight aircraft and light sport aircraft, and a major producer of engines for other light aircraft.

== History ==
The company was founded in 1920 in Dresden, Saxony, Germany, as ROTAX-WERK AG, the name referring to the "rotanda axis" used in the 1906 bicycle freewheel patent by Friedrich Theodor Gottschalk (1858-1932). In 1930, Rotax was taken over by Fichtel & Sachs and transferred its operations, soon reduced to sales, to Schweinfurt, northern Bavaria, Germany. When this area came within reach of allied bombing in 1943, the engine production of Fichtel & Sachs was moved further south-east within the Greater German Reich, to Wels, Reichsgau Oberdonau, into the facilities of Reform-Werke Bauer & Co that had produced agricultural machines. To conceal this move, the Rotax name was used.

After the war, under US control, Reform-Werke Bauer resumed agricultural production in the Wels city center near the central station. Rotax was moved to nearby Gunskirchen in 1947, and ownership was transferred by the 1955 Austrian State Treaty to Austria. In 1959, the majority of Rotax shares were taken over by the Vienna-based Lohner-Werke, a manufacturer of car and railway wagon bodies.

In 1970, Lohner-Rotax was bought by the Canadian Bombardier Inc. The former Bombardier branch, Bombardier Recreational Products, now an independent company, uses Rotax engines in its ground vehicles, personal water craft, and snowmobiles.

== Applications ==
=== Snowmobiles ===
The original application for Rotax engines was Ski-Doo snowmobiles from Bombardier Recreational Products including two-stroke and four-stroke, turbocharged and naturally aspirated, two- and three-cylinder models.

=== Aircraft ===
Rotax is one of the world's principal suppliers of aircraft engines for ultralight aircraft, light aircraft and unmanned aerial vehicles. By 2017, more than 180,000 Rotax aircraft engines had been sold over more than 40 years. In the light aircraft class, in 1998 Rotax outsold all other aero engine manufacturers combined. Their four-stroke engines powered most U.S.-certified light sport aircraft when they first appeared around 2004. Over two decades later, Rotax engines remain the most popular line of engines for light sport and ultralight aircraft, and the second-most-popular (after Lycoming Engines) for U.S. Experimental / Amateur-Built (E/A-B) aircraft.

==== Two-stroke aircraft engines ====
Rotax air-cooled, two-stroke engines began appearing on ultralight aircraft in the early 1980s, with a pair of single-cylinder, 7.1 kW (9.5 hp) Rotax 185s powering the single-seat Lazair ultralight by 1982. Soon, the 19 kW (26 hp), single-cylinder Rotax 277 became the most widely used engine powering U.S. ultralight aircraft (and remains, for many, the only Rotax engine they can use to adequately power the aircraft and still remain within the FAA-mandated weight limits for ultralight aircraft which can be operated without a pilot's license).

Two-stroke Rotax model numbers approximated the engine's displacement (in cubic centimeters), and the first two digits (from the 277, on) are very roughly similar to the engine's horsepower (e.g.: The Rotax 447 engine displaces 437 cc, and is rated at 30 kW (40 hp)).

Subsequent evolutions of the early designs included the two-cylinder, two-stroke Rotax 377, Rotax 447, and Rotax 503, all in production by 1985 (the last of these, the 503, was discontinued in 2010-2011, by then the most popular engine it its class, and still widely used as of 2023). Later two-stroke designs included the Rotax 532 (circa 1984) and Rotax 582, both of which augmented the air-cooling with liquid-cooled cylinder heads.

Most Rotax two-stroke engines were rated, recommended, or reported with a TBO (time between overhauls) of about 150-300 hours (compared to 1200-2000 hours for government-certified, conventional, four-stroke, light aircraft engines), though later models improved upon that some.

==== Four-stroke aircraft engines ====
Moving towards more demanding aircraft applications, Rotax, by 1989, developed a four-stroke, four-cylinder, engine: the Rotax 912, with versions eventually ranging from 60 to 75 kW (80 to 100 hp), followed by a turbocharged 115 horsepower Rotax 914.

Rotax four-stroke engines differ from conventional four-stroke aircraft engines by their unusually small displacement for the amount of power -- compensated for by higher than normal rotational speed (over 5,000 rpm). To reduce propeller-shaft speeds to normal aircraft propeller rotational speeds, (around 2300-2400 rpm) the engines use a reduction gearbox. They are also designed to accept motor spirit, with up to 10% ethanol content.

These engines were initially given a 600-hour Time Before Overhaul (TBO), less than traditional light aircraft engines. But operational experience and modifications to address specific reliability issues over time gradually extended the TBO to 2,000 hours. An independent 2022 statistical study of U.S. government accident data found that the Rotax 912 family had the lowest rate of failure of the six most common lines of engines used in registered Experimental/Amateur-Built (E/A-B) aircraft.

By 2014, Rotax had produced and sold 50,000 of 912/914 four-stroke engines. Later models increased power, with several variants of the 912 family, and a new 100 kW (135 hp) Rotax 915 iS.

The Rotax four-stroke aircraft engine line immediately dominated the emerging category of U.S.-certified "Light Sport Aircraft" (LSAs), powering most of them. One general aviation industry media reporter found that 70-80% of the 66,000 aircraft he'd identified, worldwide, used Rotax four-stroke engines. The 912/914/915 series also powers larger certified aircraft, including the Diamond Katana, and the twin-engined Tecnam P2006T and Leza/Lockwood Aircam.

=== Motorcycles ===
The Can-Am division of Bombardier Inc. developed a line of motorcycles starting in 1971, powered by Rotax engines. The Can-Am motorcycle operation was outsourced to Armstrong-CCM Motorcycles in 1983, with production ending in 1987.

Can-Am resumed motorcycle production with a series of on-road three-wheel motorcycles, starting with the Spyder, using Rotax engines. As of 2020, there are three models: the Ryker uses the 2-cylinder 600 ACE and 3-cylinder 900 ACE, the Spyder F3 and the Spyder RT use the 3-cylinder 1330 ACE. 1000 V-twin 5sp.

In the motorcycle world Rotax are particularly known for their single-cylinder engines of comparatively small to medium displacement. Several major motorbike manufacturers, who are otherwise renowned for their proprietary but bigger engines, use Rotax engines in their smaller models.

As an example of larger displacements, Rotax developed a 798 cc parallel twin engine with and for BMW, which was built from 2006 to 2020.

Brands using Rotax engines include:

- Aprilia Pegaso, Aprilia RSV Mille, Aprilia RSV 1000 R, Aprilia Tuono the Falco and Futura.
- Armstrong Motorcycles
- ATK 250, 350, 406, 560, 604, 605
- BMW F650, BMW F800S, BMW F800ST, BMW F800GT, BMW F800R, BMW F800GS
- Buell 1125, 604, 636 ccm
- Clews Competition Motorcycles
- Harley-Davidson MT500 MT350
- KTM
- Matchless
- MV Agusta
- MZ
- Classic Legends BSA Gold Star 650

=== Personal watercraft ===
As of 2020, all Sea-Doo brand personal watercraft from Bombardier Recreational Products are equipped with four-stroke, supercharged and normally aspirated, three-cylinder Rotax engines of the Advanced Combustion Efficiency (ACE) series.

=== Off-road vehicles ===
Can-Am Off-Road vehicles from Bombardier Recreational Products are equipped with Rotax engines.

=== Karting ===
The company introduced the Rotax Max for karting in 1998, and started organizing the Rotax Max Challenge in 2000.

== Products ==
=== Aircraft engines ===
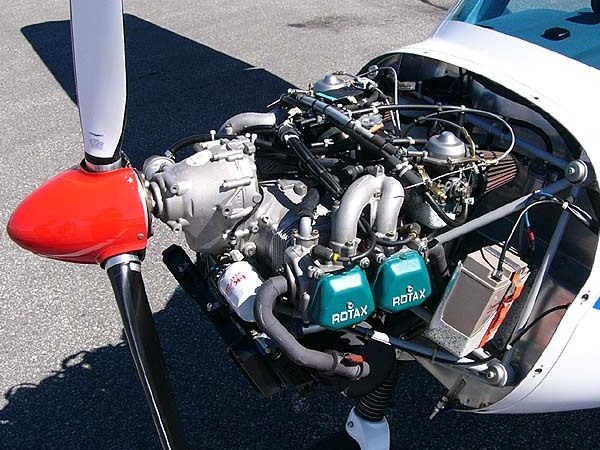
Rotax 912 installation

Rotax engines designed specifically for light aircraft include both four-stroke and two-stroke models.

Current models are:

- Rotax 912 series, four-stroke
- Rotax 914 series, four-stroke
- Rotax 915 series, four-stroke
- Rotax 916 series, four-stroke

Certified engines
Model	912 A/F	914 F2/F3/F4	912 S/iSc Sport	915 iSc A/B - 916 iSc3 B
Type certification	25 September 1989	15 May 1996	27 November 1998	14 December 2017
Configuration	4-stroke, 4 cylinder boxer, spark ignition, liquid cooled heads, ram-air cooled cylinders, dry sump			
Aspiration	natural	turbocharger	natural	turbocharger and intercooler
Fuel delivery	2× CD carburetors		injection, dual channel FADEC	
Fuel	automotive petrol or AVGAS			
Stroke	61 mm (2.4 in)			
Bore	79.5 mm (3.13 in)		84 mm (3.3 in)	
Displacement	1,211 cc (73.9 cu in)		1,352 cc (82.5 cu in)	
Compression	9:1		10.8:1	8.2:1
Gear ratio	2.27:1 / 2.43:1	2.43:1		2.55:1
Length	590 mm (23 in)	665 mm (26.2 in)	596 mm (23.5 in)	657 mm (25.9 in)
Height	375 mm (14.8 in)	531 mm (20.9 in)	398 mm (15.7 in)	398 mm (15.7 in)
Width	576 mm (22.7 in)		578 mm (22.8 in)	
Dry weight	57.1–59.8 kg (126–132 lb)	71.7–74.4 kg (158–164 lb)	58.3–64.4 kg (129–142 lb)	84.6–85.2 kg (187–188 lb)
Take-off power	59.6 kW (79.9 hp)	84.5 kW (113.3 hp)	73.5 kW (98.6 hp)	100–117 kW (134–157 hp)
Take-off rotation	5800 rpm			

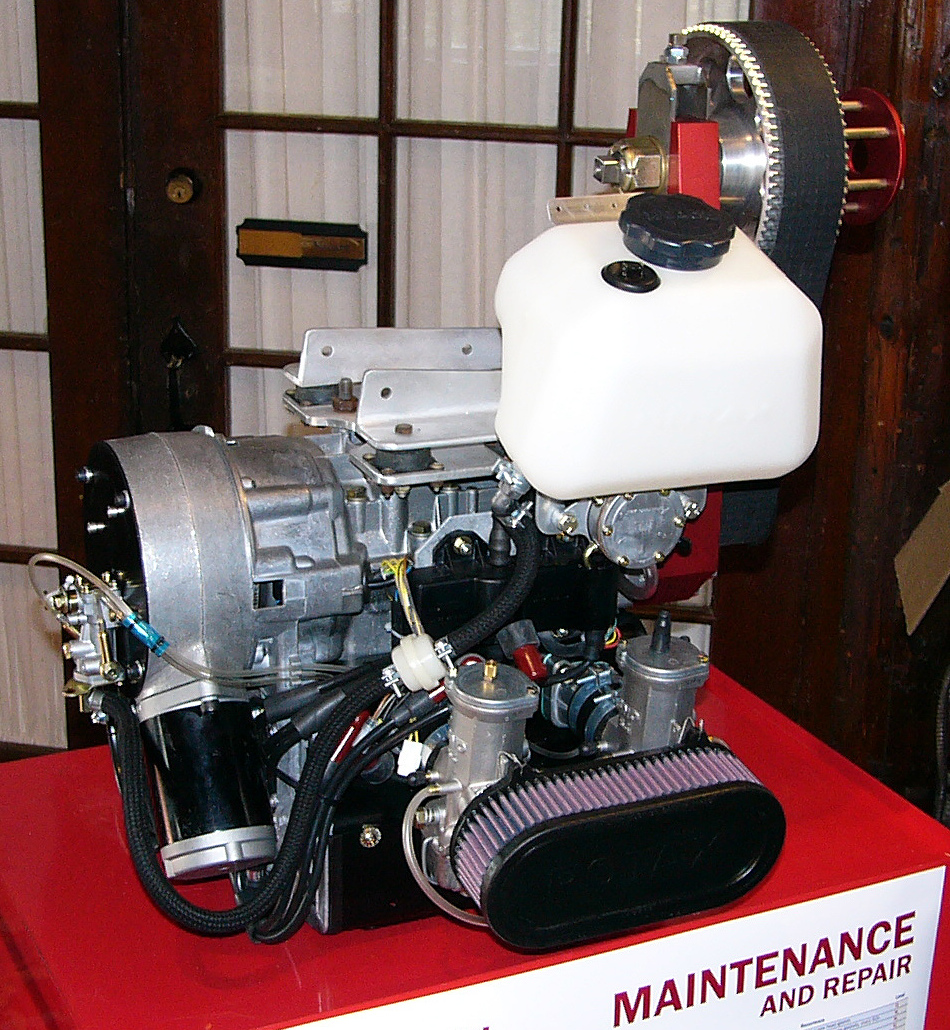
Rotax 503

Historical models no longer in production include:

- Rotax 275, two-stroke
- Rotax 277, two-stroke
- Rotax 377, two-stroke
- Rotax 447 UL, two-stroke
- Rotax 503 UL, two-stroke
- Rotax 532 UL, two-stroke
- Rotax 535 certified two-stroke
- Rotax 582 UL, two-stroke
- Rotax 618 UL, two-stroke

=== Karting engines ===
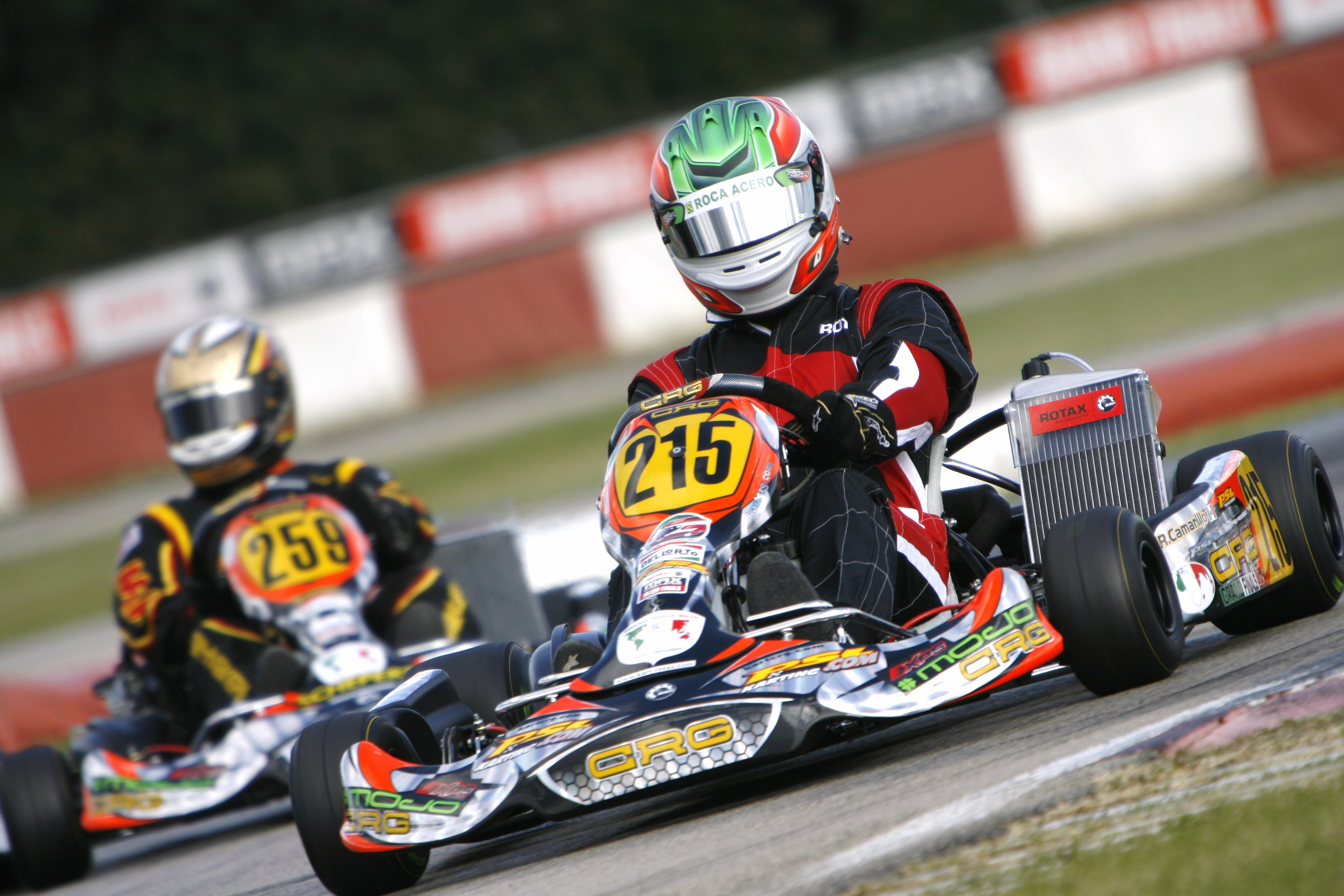
Rotax Max DD2 Kart

The Rotax MAX engine karting engine is a two-stroke engine series, launched in 1997.

=== OEM engines ===
The company also produces unbranded engines, parts and complete powertrains for original equipment manufacturers (OEM). Uses include motor bikes and scooters, with complete engines which include:

- Rotax 122
- Rotax 123
- Rotax 144
- Rotax 500
- Rotax 650
- Rotax 804
- Rotax 990
- Rotax 1125
