= Chris Pfeiffer =

German motorcycle stunt rider (1970–2022)

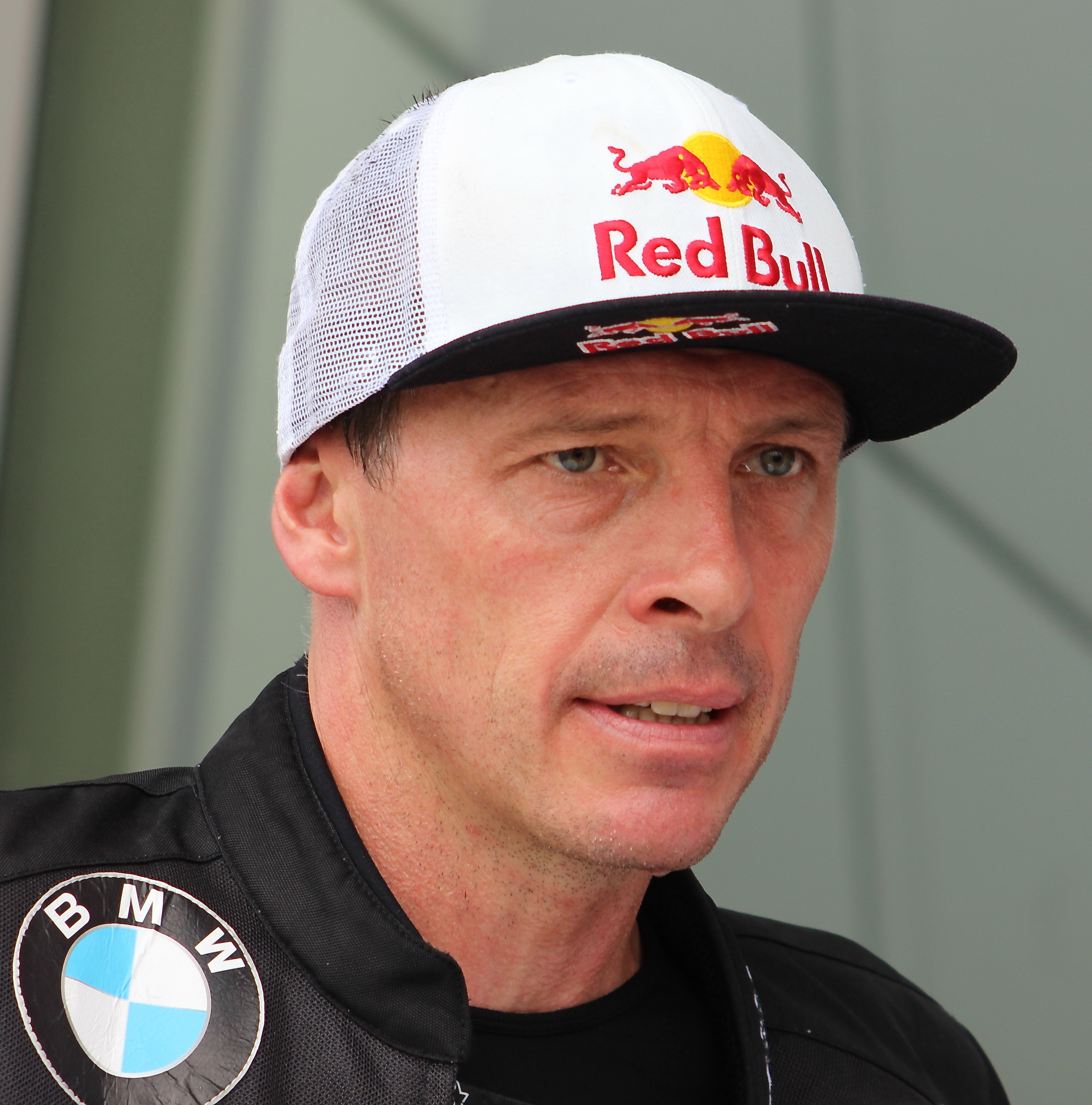
- Pfeiffer in 2014
- Born: 20 April 1970; Weilheim-Schongau, Bavaria, West Germany
- Died: 12 March 2022 (aged 51); Halblech, Germany
- Occupation: Stunt rider
- Years active: 1993–2015

Christian Pfeiffer (20 April 1970 – 12 March 2022) was a German motorcycle stunt rider and multiple time world champion (2003, 2007, 2008 and 2009). He was a four-time winner of the prestigious Red Bull Scramble (1996, 1997, 2000 and 2004), and he also broke many Guinness World Records during his 20-year professional career as a rider. He was also a four-time European Championship winner (2004, 2006, 2007 and 2010).

== Career ==
Pfeiffer inherited the passion for motorcycle riding from his father at a young age, and his father gifted him a modified bike when he was only five years old. He learnt the art of freestyle biking stunts at the age of ten. At the age of ten, in 1980, he won his first-ever trial race on a motocross bike. He took up stunt riding to prolong his career in the mid-1990s. In 1985, Pfeiffer won the West German national title at the junior level in the motocross event at the age of 15. At the age of 18, he won the OMK Cup, which is a German National Championship for B license holders.

Pfeiffer's most notable world record came in 1997, when he successfully jumped over 33 people lying next to each other without a ramp. In 1999, two years later, he attempted to break his own world record, but he suffered severe, complicated fractures due to a technical fault.

Pfeiffer played a key role in transforming BMW's image in the late 2000s. He became a world champion for the first time in 2003. In 2004, he pulled off a 115-degree wheelie during the 'Stuntwars' contest held in Florida, and his stunt surprised the viewers with how such a stunt could be possible on a bike. He won the European Championship for the first time in 2004. He won the Florida Stuntwars in 2006.

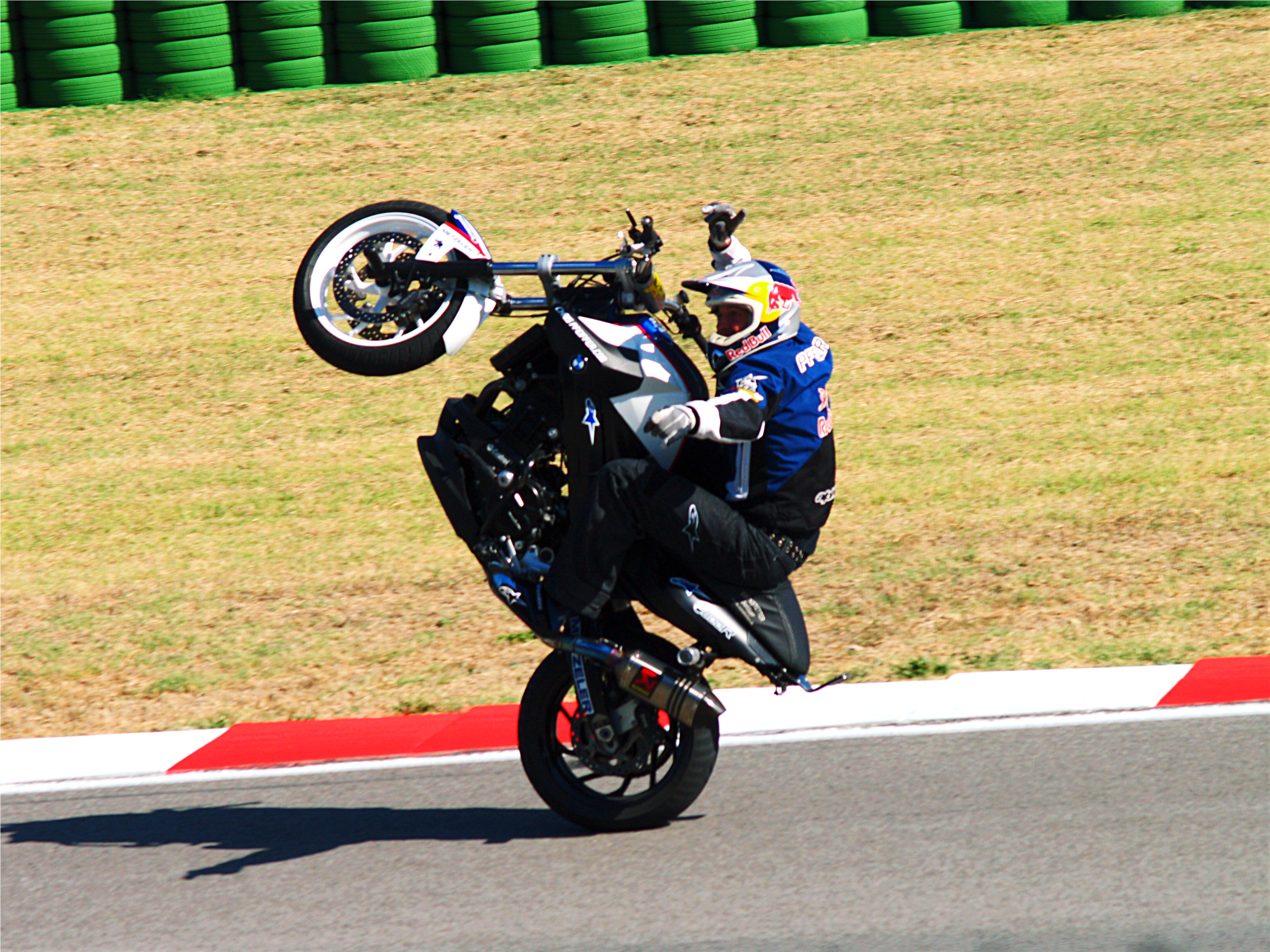
Pfeiffer performs a stunt on the F800R

The BMW F800R was first introduced when Pfeiffer started using the custom bike for his tricks. Pfeiffer first started using a BMW F800S in January 2006 and eventually transformed the S into an R model to lighten the bike's weight and make it more suitable for motorcycle stunt riding. In honor of Pfeiffer, BMW started offering a limited edition of 68 Chris-Pfeiffer-Edition BMW F800R models, which have custom paintwork and an Akrapovič exhaust.

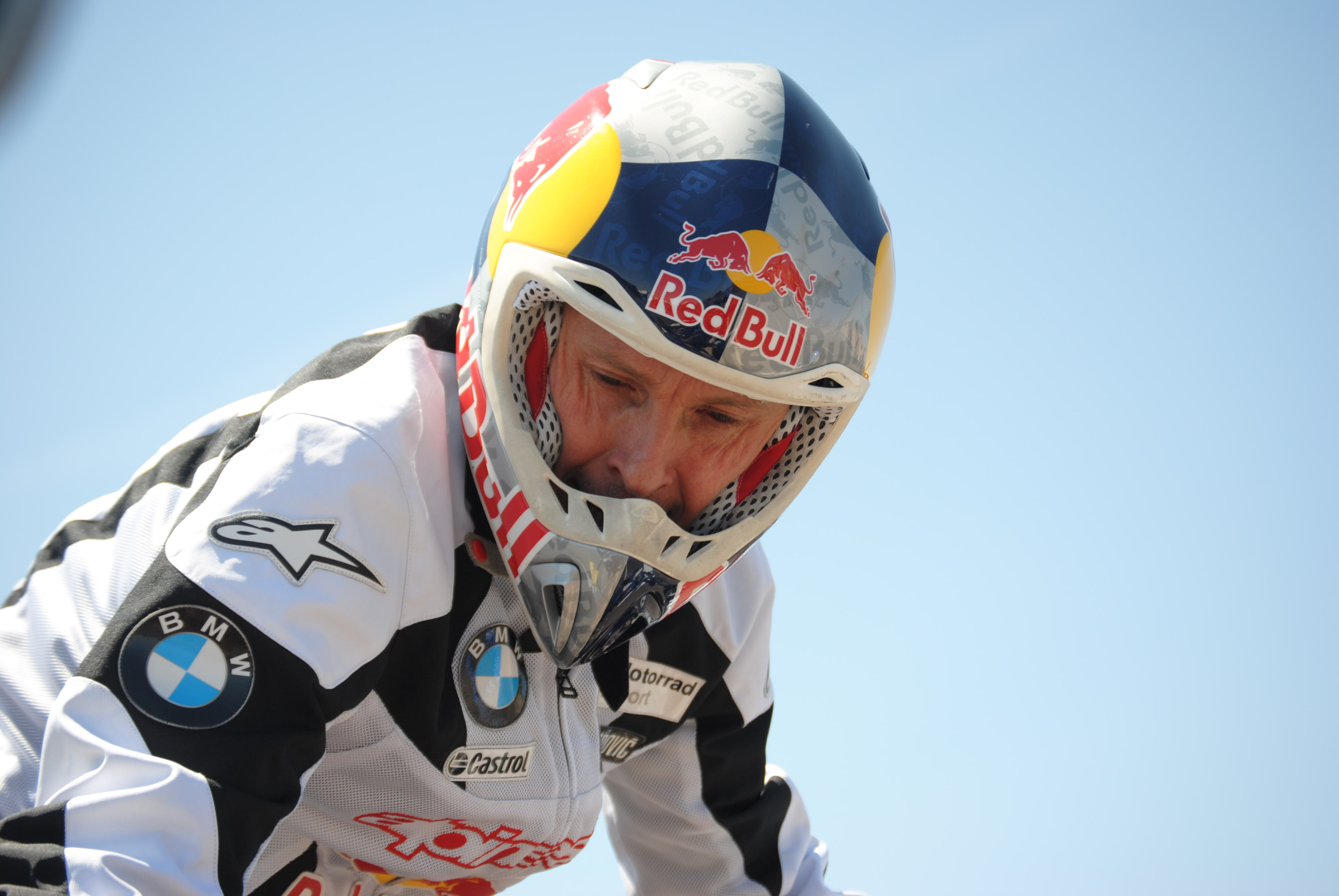
Pfeiffer performs a stunt at the Grand Prix Automobile de Marrakech 2013

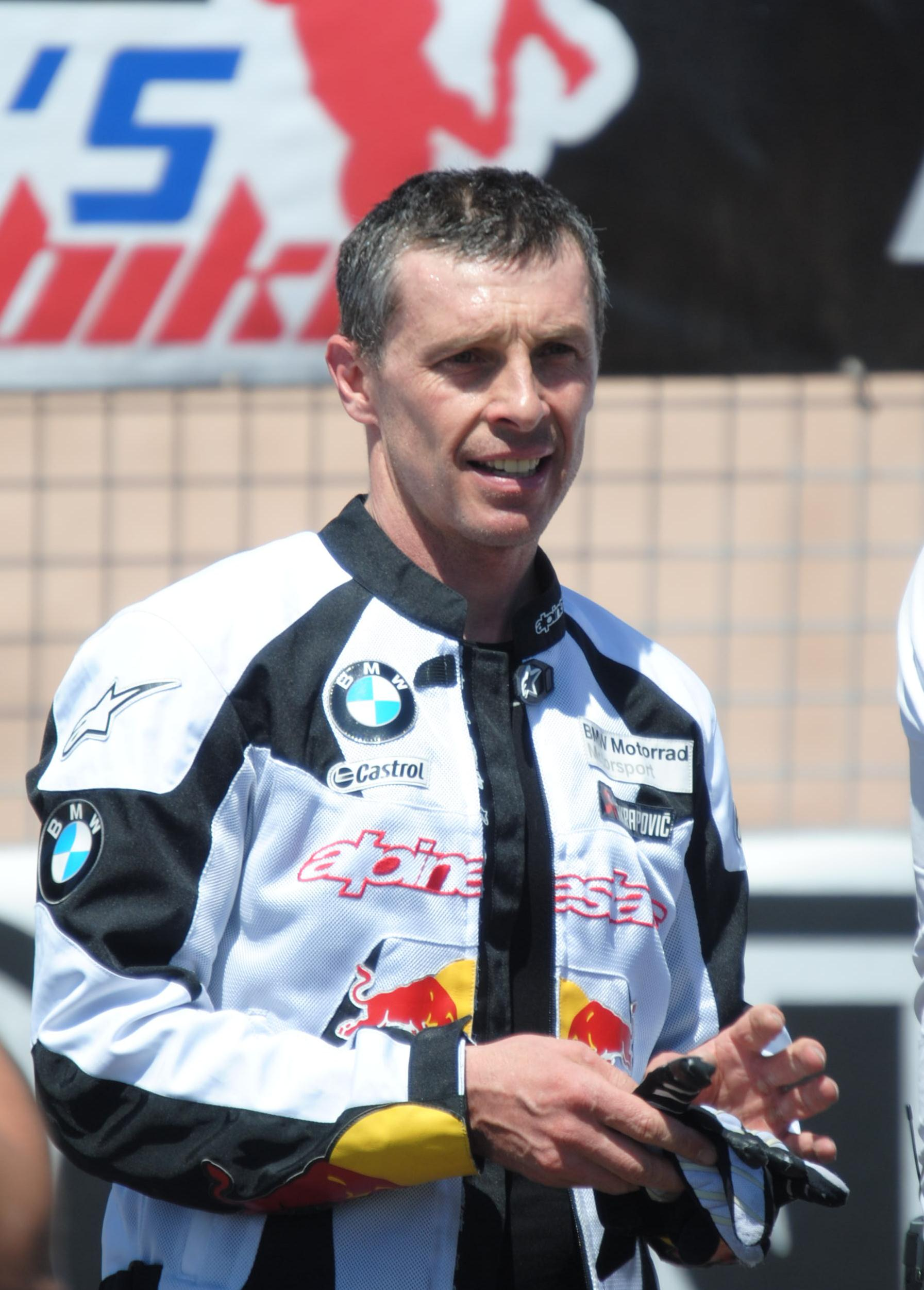
Pfeiffer during the Grand Prix Automobile de Marrakech 2013

Pfeiffer travelled all around the world to complete and promote stunt riding for free. In his professional career, he travelled to approximately 94 countries. During his visits to various countries, he had exhibited various stunts, including high chair wheelies, no-hand wheelies, stoppies, circular wheelies, rolling, and burnouts.

Pfeiffer remains the only person in history to have scaled the level three climb at Via Tina in Arco, Italy, on his bike. During his playing career, he worked alongside Hollywood actor Tom Cruise and skateboarder Tony Hawk. He won the Red Bull Scramble four times, achieving this with his final victory in Austria. He rode his last stunt riding contest in 2010. He announced his retirement from the sport in 2015 to spend quality time with his family.

== Death ==
Pfeiffer died by suicide on 12 March 2022. His death was announced three days later. He had depression.
