= BMW G 310 R =

Standard motorcycle

BMW G310R
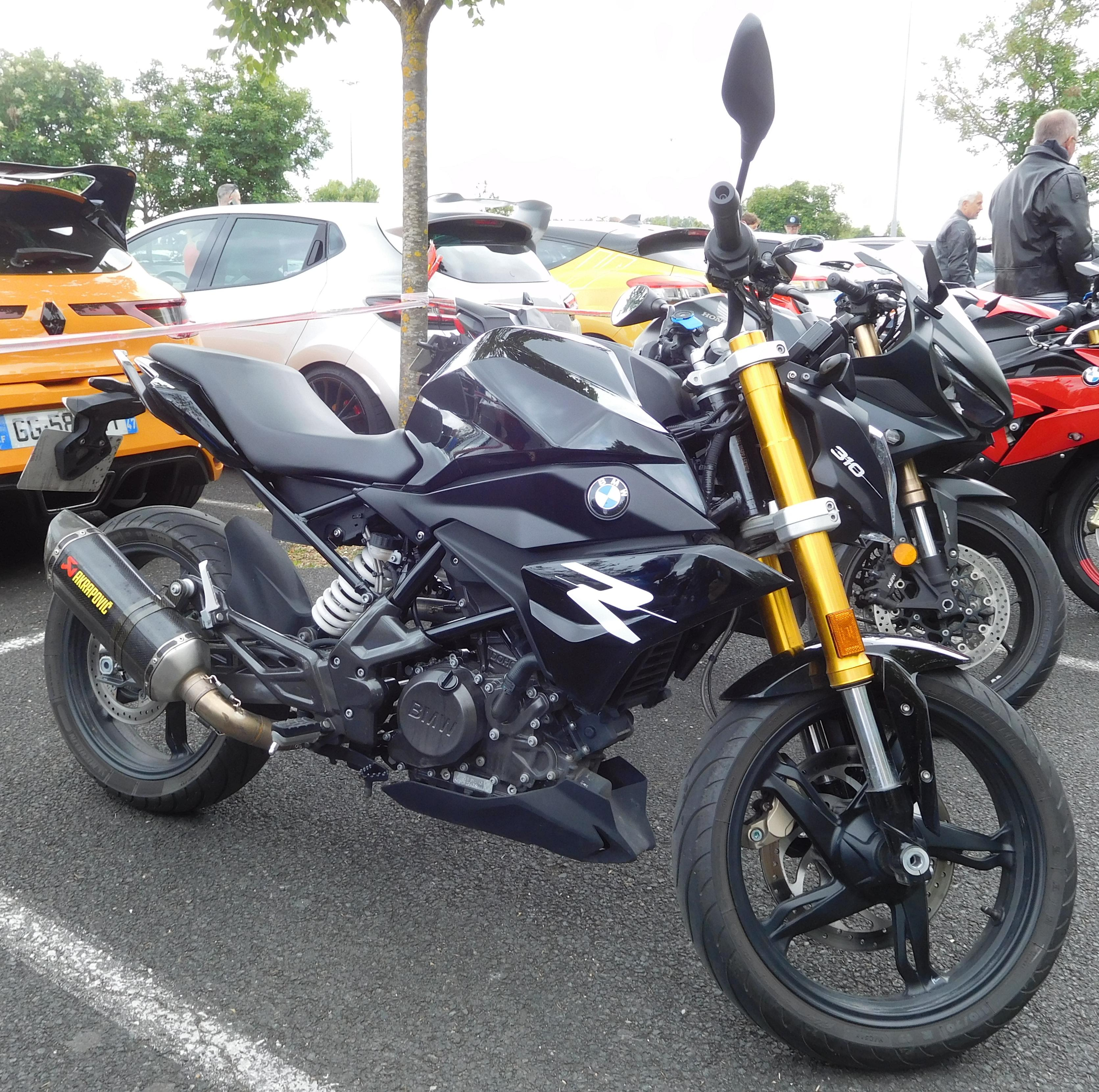
- Manufacturer: BMW Motorrad
- Production: 2015-2025
- Assembly: Hosur, Tamil Nadu, India
- Class: Naked
- Engine: 313 cc (19.1 cu in) single
- Bore / stroke: 80.0 mm × 62.1 mm (3.15 in × 2.44 in)
- Compression ratio: 10.9:1
- Top speed: 143 km/h
- Power: 25 kW (33.6 bhp) @ 9,500 rpm (claimed)
- Torque: 28 N⋅m (21 lbf⋅ft) @ 7,500 rpm (claimed)
- Transmission: Synchromesh 6-speed, multiple-disc clutch, endless X-ring chain
- Brakes: Front: 300 mm disc, radially bolted 4-piston fixed caliper Rear: 240 mm disc, single-piston floating caliper
- Tires: Front: 110/70 R17; Rear: 150/60 R17
- Wheelbase: 1,374 mm (54.1 in)
- Dimensions: L: 1,988 mm (78.3 in); W: 896 mm (35.3 in); H: 1,227 mm (48.3 in)
- Seat height: 785 mm (30.9 in)
- Weight: 158.5 kg (349 lb) (claimed) (wet)
- Fuel capacity: 11 L (2.4 imp gal; 2.9 US gal)
- Related: BMW G310GS, BMW G310RR

The BMW G310R is an India-made entry-level standard motorcycle. It is BMW's first, modern, economical, beginner motorcycle sold under the BMW Motorrad brand. It debuted in November 2015 with global sales beginning in 2018.

The bike is powered by a four-valve 313 cc (19.1 cu in) liquid-cooled single-cylinder engine shared with the TVS Apache RR 310 that BMW says produces 25 kW (33.6 bhp) power at 9,500 rpm and 28 N⋅m (21 lbf⋅ft) torque at 7,500 rpm. The engine configuration has the intake in front of the engine, and the exhaust behind it.

BMW released the G 310 GS, an adventure bike based on the G 310 R, on July 19, 2018.

== History ==
In 2013 BMW announced they were collaborating with motorcycle manufacturer TVS for production of a series of sub-500 cc bikes in Tamil Nadu. These motorcycles were targeted for developing markets, markets with prominence of lower-displacement bikes, and as entry-level sport bikes in developed markets. This was the first time that BMW Motorrad ventured into developing the sub-500 cc bikes.

BMW K03 was the code name given to the first collaborative product of BMW-TVS. It was a test bike which was developed in India and sent to Germany for further testing and modifications.

In October 2015 in Brazil, the BMW G 310 Stunt was the first concept bike unveiled by BMW Motorrad. The commercial version of the concept was officially unveiled by BMW Motorrad the next month, at EICMA 2015 in Milan, Italy, and was shown in India at the 13th Auto Expo 2016. The bike was commercially released on July 18 globally.

The G 310 R is marketed in different segments in different countries worldwide. The Indian website Rushlane, based on a BMW promotional video, calls the G310 R "not an entry level motorcycle but a premium lightweight and compact sport bike", while the US magazine Cycle World describes the same bike as "entry-level" and "a compact muscular-type naked sport bike".

== Production ==
BMW G 310 R was developed with an intent to increase BMW's presence in global markets. It was developed in both Europe and India. The design of the bike was originally engineered by BMW in Munich, Germany, and is built and assembled at TVS Motor Company's Hosur plant in Indian state of Tamil Nadu.

== Stand/Frame Problem ==
The first models had a problem with the frame which broke across the side stand mounting. According to the UK Gov.UK website

The recall number is RM/2018/025

Reason for recall On G310-models the side stand connection might bend or in extreme case break. It is not possible to completely rule out an insecure standing position of the vehicle where this fault occurs.

How to check if the vehicle is recalled Contact the local BMW MOTORRAD UK dealership or manufacturer. You will not need to pay for anything involving the recall.

How the manufacturer will repair On affected machines the side stand connection will be checked for prior damage and an additional bearing block for reinforcement purposes will be installed.

Number of affected vehicles 923

== Specifications ==
BMW G 310 R has a 313 cc (19.1 cu in) liquid-cooled four-stroke 4-valve single-cylinder reverse-inclined DOHC engine, with a bore and stroke of 80.0 mm × 62.1 mm (3.15 in × 2.44 in), and a 10,500 rpm redline. It has self start, static rev limiter, counterbalance shaft, wet sump, and electronic fuel injection and requires at least 95 RON petrol. It is compatible with up to 10% ethanol (E10). The fuel capacity is 11 L (2.4 imp gal; 2.9 US gal).

It has a side-mounted inclined exhaust, a kickstand sensor, and a plastic engine spoiler.

The instrument panel consist of a monochrome segment LCD with engine temperature meter.

There are two auxiliary power sockets and a steering lock.

The graphics are implemented using decals.

It has a pillion seat, pillion footrests, and rear handles.

The G 310 R has a length of 1988 mm, width of 896 mm and height of 1227 mm, a wheelbase of 1374 mm, and a seat height of 785 mm. The steering angle is 64.9°. It has an upside-down fork and a mono rear shock absorber with adjustable preload. The bike has a front 110/70 R17 and a rear 150/60 R17 Michelin Pilot Street Radial tubeless tyre and 5-spoke alloy rims. The braking of the bike features a dual-channel anti-lock braking system, with the front using a single 300 mm disc, radially-bolted 4-piston fixed-caliper brake and the rear, a single 240 mm disc, single-piston floating caliper brake. It has an axial front master brake cylinder. The brakes are made by ByBre.

It has "no brag-worthy goodies like a traction control system or a quick shifter" and does not use CAN bus. Compares to the rival KTM 390 Duke, the G 310 R lacks Bluetooth connectivity, a full-colour display, and switchable ABS.

== 2021 facelift ==
Since 2021, it is Euro 5 compliant and has Idle Speed Control, electronic throttle control and an assist-and-slipper clutch, as well as adjustable levers, LED headlight and indicators.

== 2022 facelift ==
In 2022, two new color options were introduced at an ex-showroom price of ₹2.7 lakh (US$2,800) in India.

In Germany, it was released at €5,550 (US$6,563.99).

== Performance ==
BMW says that the G 310 R produces 25.1 kW (33.6 bhp) at 9,500 rpm and a torque of 28 N⋅m (21 lbf⋅ft) at 7,500 rpm. BMW claims the top speed is 144 km/h (89 mph). BMW's claimed wet weight is 158.5 kg (349 lb).

Some performance tests listed here were conducted by Otomotif tabloid from Indonesia in July 2017.

Parameter	Time
0–60 km/h (37 mph)	3.7 s
0–80 km/h (50 mph)	5 s
0–100 km/h (62 mph)	7.5 s
0–100 m (330 ft)	6.9 s @ 95.8 km/h (59.5 mph)
0–201 m (1/8 mile)	10.3 s @ 116.1 km/h (72.1 mph)
0–402 m (1/4 mile)	15.9 s @ 133.9 km/h (83.2 mph)
Top speed (on speedometer)	152 km/h (94 mph)
Top speed (Racelogic)	149.8 km/h (93.1 mph)
Fuel consumption	4 L/100 km (71 mpg_{‑imp}; 59 mpg_{‑US})
