= BMW R1200C =

R1200C
- Manufacturer: BMW Motorrad
- Production: 1997–2004
- Class: Cruiser
- Engine: 1,170 cc (71 cu in) two-cylinder boxer
- Bore / stroke: 101 mm × 73 mm (4.0 in × 2.9 in)
- Brakes: F: 2×disc, R: disc (optional ABS)
- Dimensions: L: 2,340 mm (92 in); W: 1,050 mm (41 in); H: 1,130 mm (44 in)
- Seat height: 740 mm (29 in)
- Fuel capacity: 17 L (3.7 imp gal; 4.5 US gal)

The BMW R1200C is a cruiser motorcycle made by BMW Motorrad from 1997 to 2004. BMW manufactured 40,218 units, including a smaller engine version, the R850C, which was produced from 1997 to 2000.

The R1200C was BMW's attempt to tap into the cruiser market. The R1200C was designed by BMW head designer David Robb, with a cruiser riding posture. From its inception, the R1200C had a passenger seat that could fold up to become a driver backrest with three different angles, adjustable while riding.

BMW first released the R1200C with an advance promotional placement of the motorcycle in the James Bond film Tomorrow Never Dies. The R1200C was one of four BMW motorcycles in The Art of the Motorcycle exhibition at the Guggenheim Museum in New York City in 1998.

== Production ==
When BMW ended production of the R1200C lineup, Dr. Herbert Diess, then President BMW Motorrad, cited a prime reason for discontinuing the bike was the apparent unsuitability of the 1,170 cc (71 cu in), 61 hp (45 kW) engine to then current market tastes and the unavailability of a suitable engine for further development, but did not rule out BMW pursuing a reinterpretation of the cruiser idea at a later date. In 2004 a final special model of the R1200C Montauk (sold as a 2005 model and registered as such) as a commemorative Montauk model was presented, of which 350 units were built. Only six of these units were shipped to North America, all six to the Canadian market. 4 into Ontario and 2 into Quebec. Since originally shipped to this market, one has been imported into the USA.

== Versions ==
- Classic: The "Classic" was not a new model, but after the Avantgarde and the Independent versions came on the market, it was the "original" R1200C. An otherwise identical variant with a smaller capacity, the R850C, was also manufactured during the first three years of production, from 1997 to 2000. However, it was discontinued after only three years and 1505 units built, due to low sales, compared to the R1200C.
- Avantgarde: Introduced in 2000, less chrome (added graphite look), medium height bars, ABS a cost option.
- Independent (designated "Phoenix" for U.S. market): Introduced in 2001, single seat (passenger seat and foot pegs optional), two-tone paint, new aluminum wheels, speedster style windshield, fog lamps, white indicator lenses, BMW rondel on alternator cover.
- Montauk: Introduced in 2003, overall ‘beefier’ design. Extended rake front end, alloy wheels and instrument panel from the R1200CL, braided brake hoses, additional vertically stacked headlight.
- Troika: Meaning trike or three-wheel model, it is a R1200C with a side car. Displayed at the IAA (Internationale Automobil Ausstellung) in Frankfurt in 1997, the side car had a torpedo-like nose, interior with leather matching the motorcycle seat, a shock that laid horizontally in front of the third wheel with a wooden step over it for the passenger, and a spoked wheel matching the motorcycle wheels.
- R1200CL: Introduced in 2002, full dress touring model that added a tachometer and analog-style clock to the instrument panel, extended rake, larger wheel size, alloy wheels, fairing, two smaller stacked separate lights for high beams, cruise control, driver floor boards, heel/toe shifter, six-speed gear box, oversized passenger seat, two 12V power outlets, heated hand grips, heated seats, clam-shell side cases and removable top case with passenger backrest. An oddity of the R1200CL was its M-shaped windscreen that created a large notch in the center so the driver has an unobstructed view ahead. The alternator was upgraded to a massive 840W. Electronics and alarm for an optional, keyless anti-theft system were pre-installed.
- R1200CLC: Same as the R1200CL, but with ABS braking standard, radio, CD player, chrome alternator cover, chrome engine guard, and chrome side luggage guards.
- 2000 Changes: For the 2000 production year, new colour configurations were available including a black engine, the rear shock was upgraded to be an adjustable hydraulic shock, and the electronic ignition and fuel injection were upgraded.
- 2004 Changes: For the final production year BMW added dual ignition, integral ABS (the brake pedal and lever, when applied independently, actuate both front and rear brakes simultaneously), improved transmission, and a passenger comfort seat available at no extra cost.

== R1200C in film and other media ==
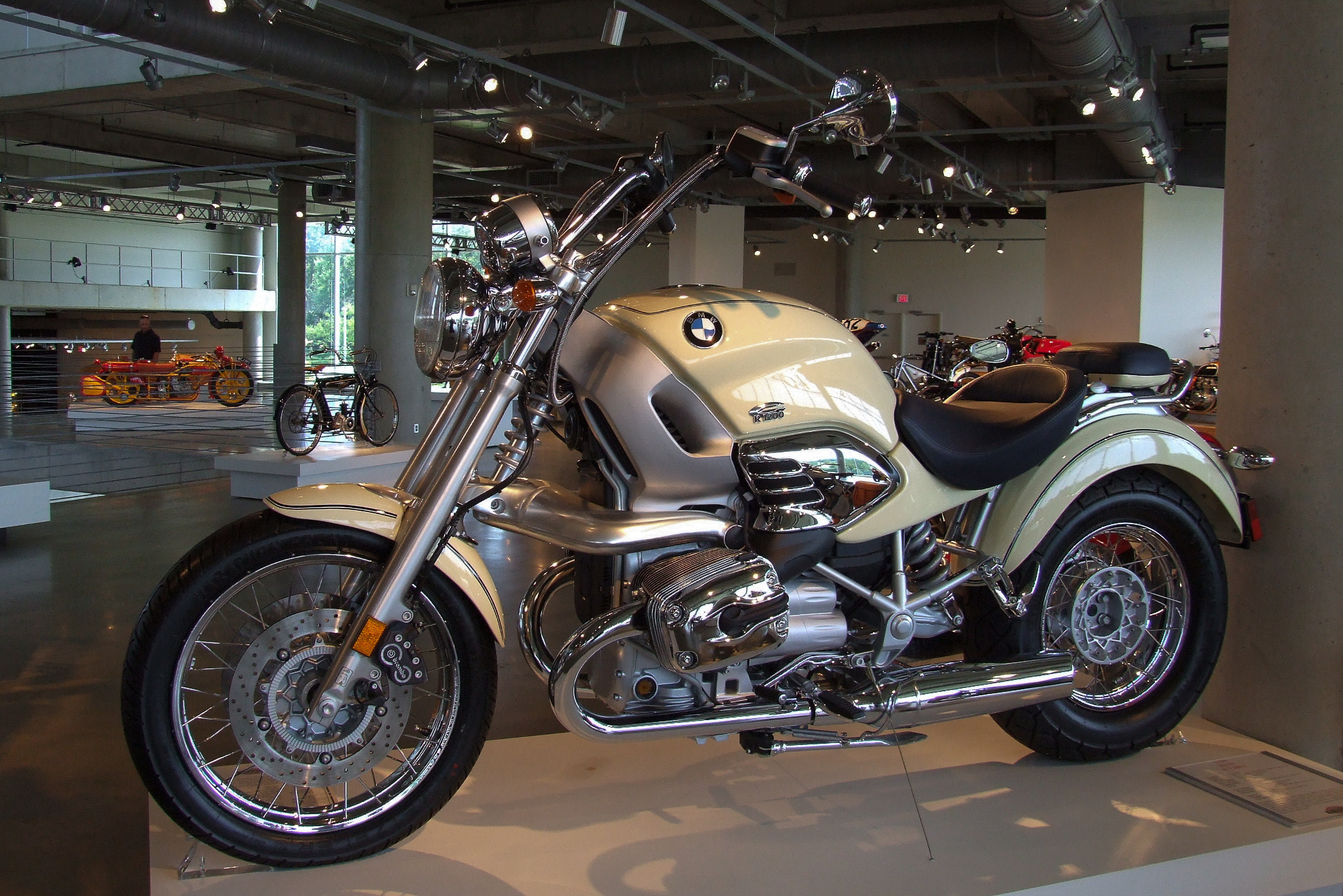
1998 R1200 C at the Barber Vintage Motorsports Museum

The R1200C made a notable appearance in the 1997 James Bond film Tomorrow Never Dies. Michelle Yeoh, in her role as Chinese spy, Wai Lin, rode the bike during the scene where she and 007, played by Pierce Brosnan, escape from Elliot Carver's henchmen.

The R1200C was one of four BMWs in the 1998 The Art of the Motorcycle exhibition at the Guggenheim in New York City, and museums in other cities. The quantity and selection of BMWs drew some criticism that the models did not all have the same significance and relevance of the other brands represented, given BMW's role as the main corporate sponsor of the show.

In 2012, the bike appeared in the Bond in Motion. 50 Vehicles. 50 Years exhibition at the National Motor Museum in Beaulieu, England.

== See also ==
- List of James Bond vehicles
- BMW R nineT
