= BMW F800GT =

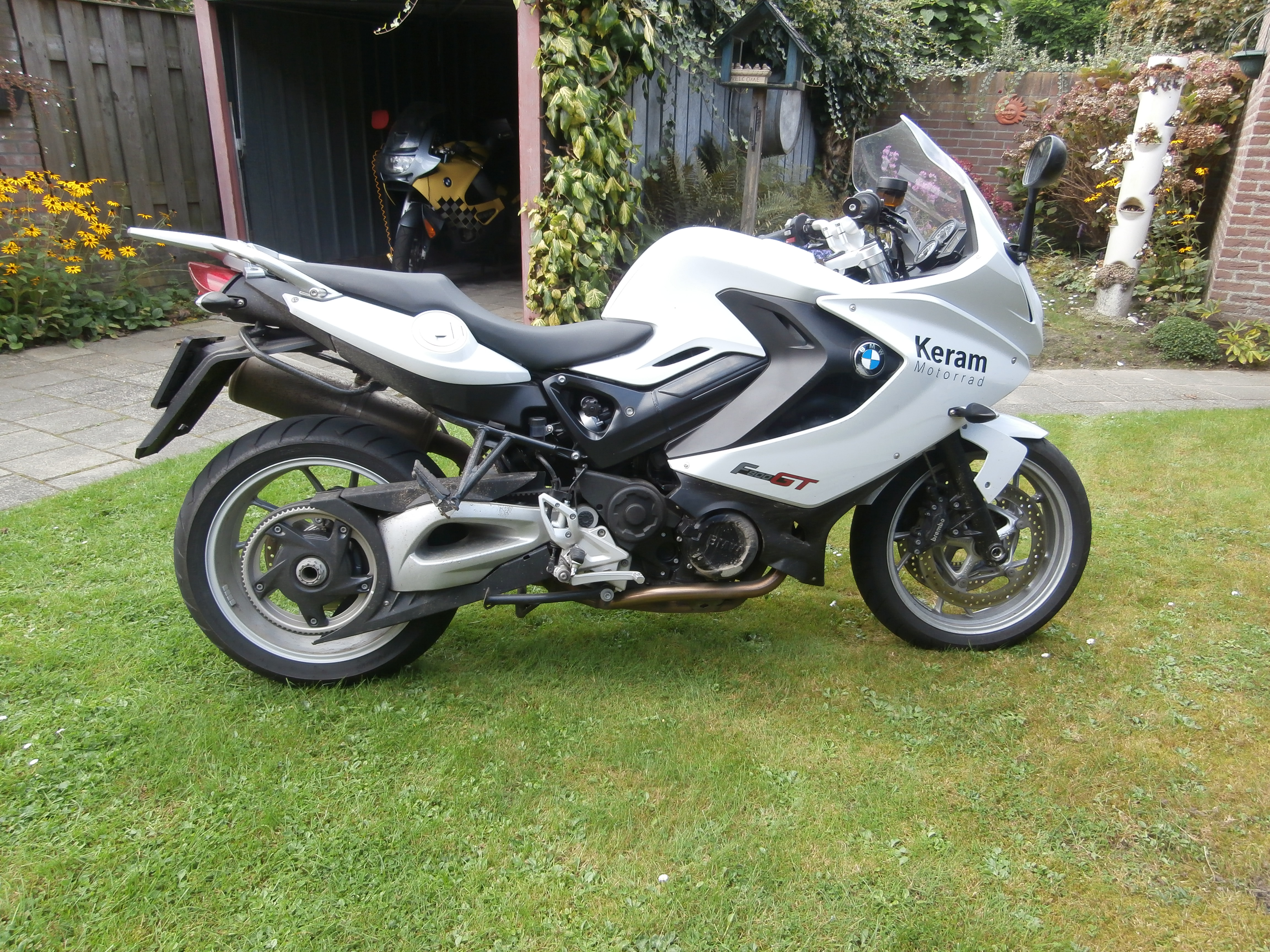
- Manufacturer: BMW Motorrad
- Production: 2013–2020
- Predecessor: F800ST
- Successor: F900XR
- Class: Sport touring
- Engine: 798 cc, parallel-twin, liquid cooled, 4-stroke, DOHC, 4 valves per cylinder
- Bore / stroke: 82 mm × 75.6 mm (3.23 in × 2.98 in)
- Compression ratio: 12.0:1
- Top speed: >200 km/h (124 mph)
- Power: 66 kW (89 hp) @ 8,000 rpm
- Torque: 86 N⋅m (63 lb⋅ft) @ 5,800 rpm
- Transmission: Constant mesh 6-speed gearbox, toothed belt with shock damper
- Frame type: Aluminium bridge frame, partially load-bearing engine
- Suspension: Front: Telescopic fork, Ø 43 mm (1.7 in), 125 mm (4.9 in) travel Rear: Single-sided aluminium swingarm, 125 mm (4.9 in) travel Optional Electronic Suspension Adjustment (ESA)
- Brakes: Front: Twin disc Ø 320 mm (13 in); Rear: Single disc Ø 265 mm (10.4 in); ABS
- Tires: Front: 120/70-ZR17; Rear: 180/55-ZR17
- Rake, trail: 63.8°, 94.6 mm (3.72 in)
- Wheelbase: 1,514 mm (59.6 in)
- Dimensions: L: 2,156 mm (84.9 in); W: 905 mm (35.6 in); H: 1,248 mm (49.1 in)
- Seat height: 800 mm (31 in)
- Weight: 213 kg (470 lb) (wet)
- Fuel capacity: 15 L (3.3 imp gal; 4.0 US gal)
- Fuel consumption: 90 km/h (56 mph): 3.4 L/100 km (83 mpg_{‑imp}; 69 mpg_{‑US}); 120 km/h (75 mph): 4.3 L/100 km (66 mpg_{‑imp}; 55 mpg_{‑US})
- Related: F800ST, F800R, F800S, F800GS, F700GS, F650GS

The BMW F800GT is a sport touring motorcycle manufactured by BMW Motorrad from 2013 through 2020. It is the successor to the F800ST, and joins the F-series range which includes the dual-sport F800GS and F700GS, and the naked F800R.

== Engine ==
As with other models in the F-series range, the F800GT uses a 798 cc (48.7 cu in) parallel-twin engine, codeveloped by BMW and Rotax. The engine has a 360° firing order which produces an exhaust note reminiscent of BMW's signature air-cooled boxer twins. However, this firing order requires both pistons to move up and down at the same time. To counter the significant inertia produced by the pistons reciprocating, BMW devised a third vestigial connecting rod to a balance weight. The result is a parallel twin with significantly reduced vibration compared to other parallel twin engine designs. The engine is lubricated by a dry sump system.

The engine produces 66 kW (89 hp) at 8,000 rpm, but can be specified with a reduced power output of either 35 kW (47 hp) for European riders on restricted Category A2 licenses, or 25 kW (34 hp).

== Equipment ==
The F800GT has a low-maintenance belt drive and single sided swingarm. ABS brakes are standard equipment. In the UK and now the US, factory options include heated grips, tire pressure monitoring system, onboard computer, LED indicators, anti theft alarm system, main centre stand, Automatic Stability Control (ASC), pannier fastenings, comfort seat, low seat, and Electronic Suspension Adjustment (ESA). BMW Motorrad also offer a range of accessories.

== New features ==
Compared to its predecessor, the F800GT offers several new features, including: power increase of 3.5 kW (5 hp); redesigned full fairing with improved wind and weather protection; introduction of optional Electronic Suspension Adjustment (ESA) and Automatic Stability Control (ASC); handwheel adjustment of rear suspension preload; 50 mm (2.0 in) longer rear swingarm; lighter cast aluminum wheels; new vibration-free handlebars with new generation switches and controls; updated instrument dials and standard fuel/temperature gauges; smoke grey turn indicators; increased load capacity (by 11 kg (24 lb); new exhaust system; new paint finishes; and a newly developed luggage system.
