= BMW F800ST =

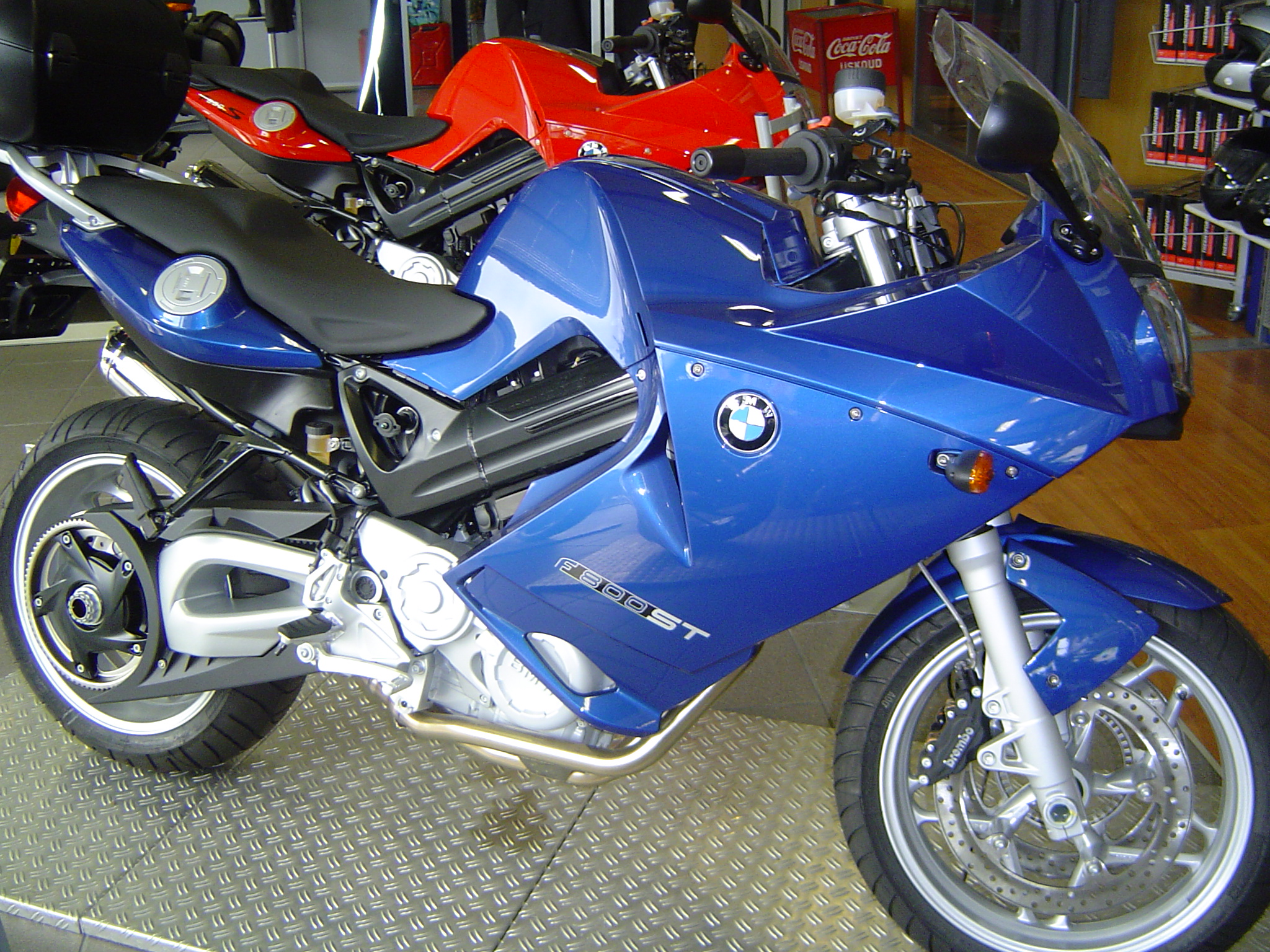
- Manufacturer: BMW Motorrad
- Production: 2006–2013
- Successor: F800GT
- Class: Sport touring
- Engine: Water-cooled four-stroke 798 cc (48.7 cu in) parallel twin built by Rotax, DOHC, 4-valves per cylinder
- Bore / stroke: 82 mm × 75.6 mm (3.23 in × 2.98 in)
- Power: 63.5 kW (85.2 hp) @ 8,000 rpm
- Torque: 86 N⋅m (63 lb⋅ft) @ 5,800 rpm
- Transmission: 6-speed, toothed belt drive
- Suspension: 43 mm telescopic fork (front), swing arm (rear)
- Brakes: Front: 2 disc, 4 piston caliper by Brembo; Rear: 1 disc, 1 piston caliper; ABS optional
- Tires: 120/70-ZR17, 180/55-ZR17
- Wheelbase: 1,466 mm (57.7 in)
- Dimensions: L: 2,082 mm (82.0 in); W: 1,155 mm (45.5 in); H: 860 mm (34 in)
- Seat height: 840 mm (33 in); 760 mm (30 in) with lowered seat and suspension
- Weight: 182 kg (401 lb) (dry); 204 kg (450 lb) (wet)
- Fuel capacity: 16.0 L (3.5 imp gal; 4.2 US gal)
- Related: F800GT, F800R, F800S, F800GS, F700GS, F650GS

The BMW F800ST is a sport touring motorcycle, made by BMW Motorrad from 2006 to 2013. Along with the closely related BMW F800S, other bikes in the F-bike range are the dual-sport F800GS, and the naked F800R. It has the same frame, engine, and suspension as the F800S, but differs primarily in fairing design and handlebar type. In 2013 it was replaced by the F800GT.

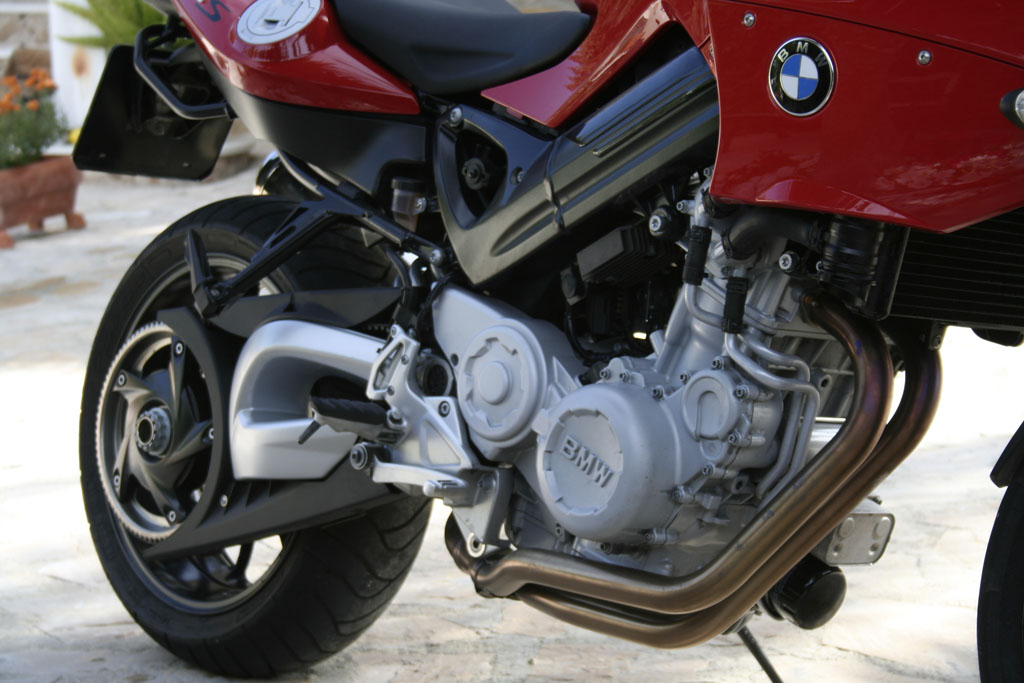
Closeup of engine and transmission

BMW developed with Rotax a 798 cc (48.7 cu in) parallel-twin engine with a 360 degree firing order. This produced an exhaust note reminiscent of BMW's signature air-cooled boxer twins. However, this firing order required both pistons to move up and down at the same time. To counter the significant inertia produced by the pistons reciprocating, BMW devised a third vestigial connecting rod to a balance weight. The result was a parallel twin with significantly reduced vibration compared with other parallel twin engine designs. The engine is oiled by a dry sump system, and a soft ignition-cut rev limiter engaged at 9,000 rpm. BMW tuned the F800 series engine to run lean, typically with air-fuel ratios in the range of 15:1 to 16:1.

The F800ST has a low-maintenance belt drive and single sided swingarm. Bikes equipped with ABS also include a rear-wheel lift detection system. Other options include LED signals, a lower seat, an alarm system, heated handlebar grips, a tire pressure monitoring system and an on-board computer system.

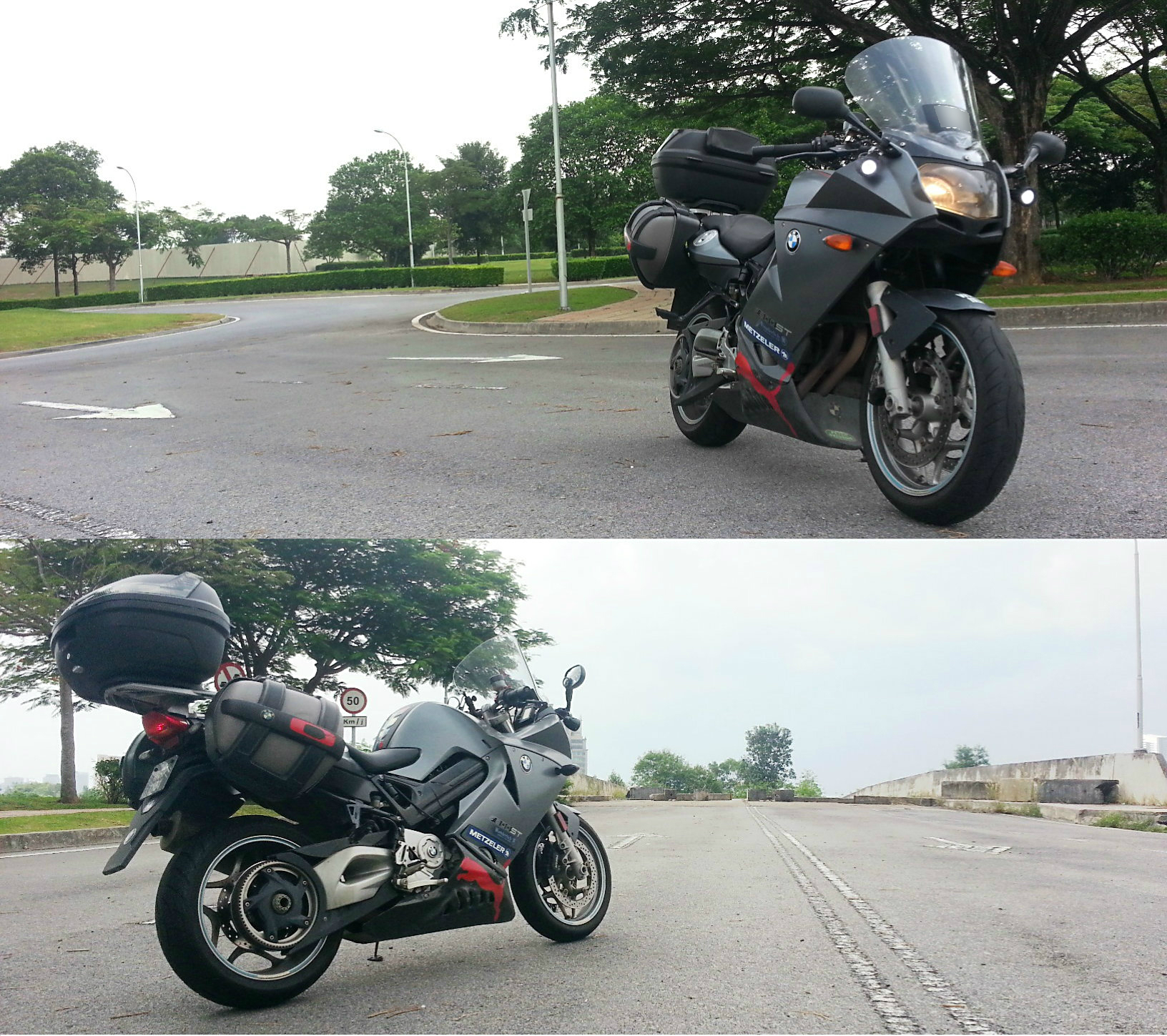
2008 F800ST with custom exhaust/windscreen/belly pan/lights/luggage boxes
