= BMW G450X =

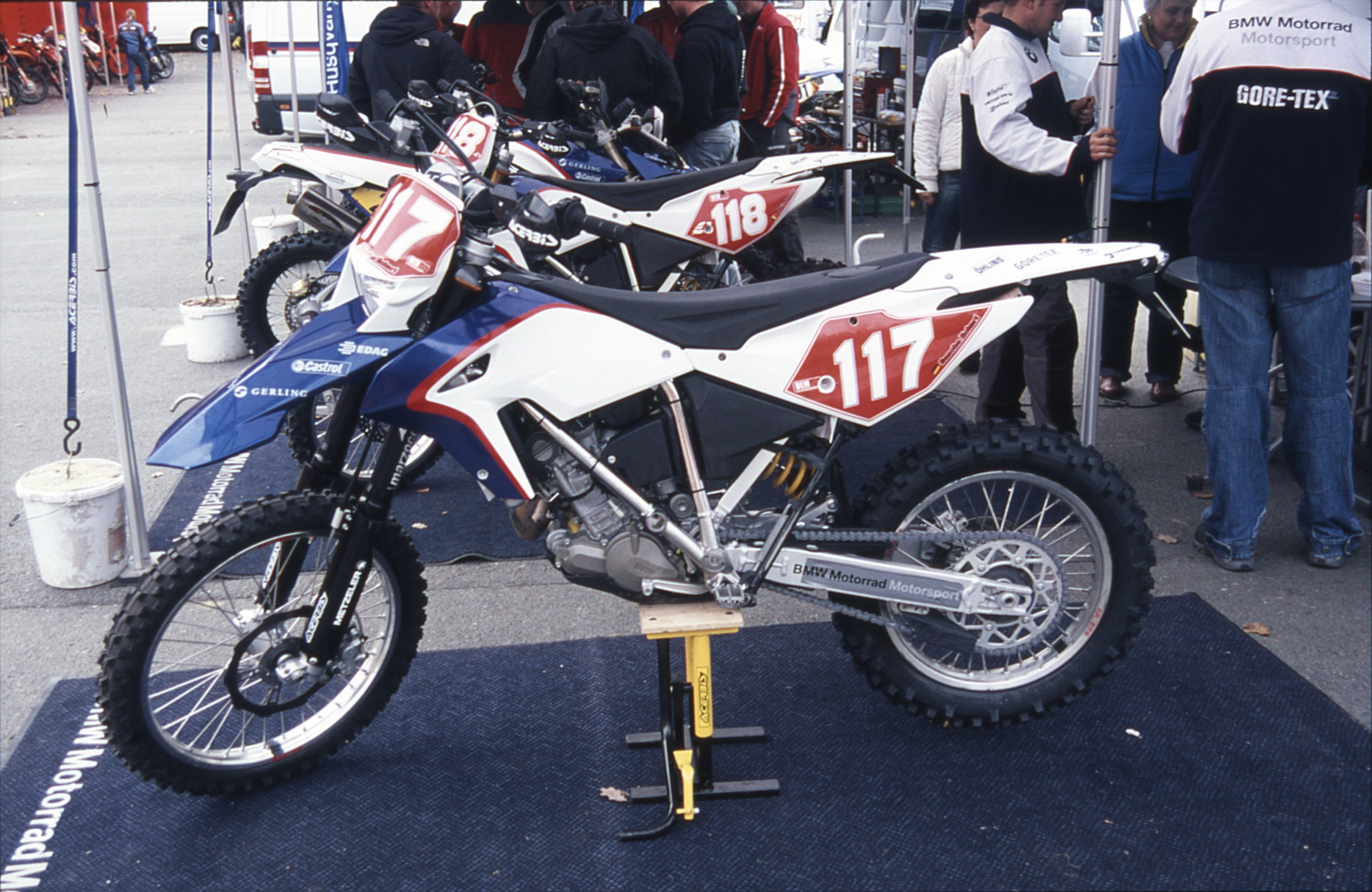
- Manufacturer: BMW Motorrad
- Parent company: BMW
- Production: 2008–2011
- Predecessor: BMW G650X Challenge
- Successor: Husqvarna TX449
- Class: Dual-sport, Enduro
- Engine: 449 cm3 four-stroke single-cylinder
- Top speed: Approximately 145 km/h (with coding plug)
- Power: 30 kW at 7000 RPM (without coding plug); 38 kW at 9000 RPM (with coding plug)
- Torque: 43 Nm at 6500 RPM (without coding plug); 44 Nm at 7800 RPM (with coding plug)
- Transmission: Claw-shift 5-speed gearbox integrated into engine casting
- Suspension: 45mm Marzocchi upside-down telescopic forks, rear Ohlins monoshock
- Brakes: Hydraulically actuated disc brakes with floating calipers
- Tires: 90/90-21 (front), 140/80-18 (rear)
- Seat height: 955 mm (unladen)
- Weight: 121 kg (wet)
- Fuel capacity: 8 litres (with 0.75 litre reserve)
- Oil capacity: 1.15 litres

The G450X is an Enduro-class motorcycle that was produced by BMW Motorrad between 2008 and 2011.

== Background and origins ==
The G450X project originated with BMW Motorrad's desire to capture a portion of the 450 four-stroke enduro class from established manufacturers, including the Japanese big four and KTM. Following the relatively poor sales achieved by BMW's F650GS-derived G650X Challenge, BMW deduced that the Challenge's lack of market acceptance had been due at least in part to its excessive weight and unconventional suspension. The relatively underpowered Challenge had weighed substantially more than competitors like the KTM 640 Adventure, and its pneumatic rear suspension strut was both unadjustable for compression and rebound damping, and expensive to rebuild.

In marketing terms, BMW Motorrad intended to position the G450X as both an enduro-class motorcycle and a viable dual-sport motorcycle. However, its narrow seat, low fuel capacity, small headlight and lack of wind protection meant this notion was questionable. Also, with BMW already producing a variety of dedicated medium-weight dual-sport motorcycles such as the G650GS and twin-cylinder F650GS, the G450X was immediately recognizable as an enduro-only machine.

The design brief for what would become the G450X specified that it should have at least as much power and torque as its established Japanese and Austrian competition, that it should be physically lighter and more compact (thereby also making it easier to ride), and that it should adhere more closely to established design conventions within the 450 four-stroke enduro class. In the process of development, BMW engineers made a number of theoretical improvements on the design baseline established by Kawasaki, Yamaha, Honda, Suzuki and KTM.

The G450X was first presented on 6 November 2007, at the EICMA 2007 trade fair in Milan.

== Nomenclature ==
The G450X's internal BMW model code is K16. The motorcycle's name follows the naming convention for BMW motorcycles. G is a reference to engine series (in this case, single-cylinder). The expected F prefix was reassigned from single-cylinder to parallel-twin motorcycles with the advent of the F800GS and twin-cylinder F650GS at approximately the same time the single-cylinder F650GS was re-designated the G650GS. 450 is a reference to the engine's quoted swept volume of 450 cm3. X signifies Cross, referring to BMW Motorrad's intent to position the G450X as both a dedicated enduro motorcycle and a dual-sport motorcycle.

== Frame ==
Departing from the enduro-class convention of a cradle-style frame in either chrome-molybdenum steel or cast aluminium, the G450X used a bridge-type main frame manufactured from welded stainless steel tubing. The main frame's lower frame tubes bridge the headstock tube and swingarm pivot in a straight line, yielding maximum rigidity for minimum weight. The steel main frame is complemented by a conventional rectangular-profile aluminium sub-frame. The size of the engine's airbox meant that the fuel tank could not be located behind the steering headstock in typical fashion. Instead, the fuel tank is located under the seat, within the confines of the rear sub-frame. The fuel filling arrangement is also unusual, with the fuel filler cap located at the rear of the seat.

== Engine ==
BMW designed an all-new 449 cm3 four-stroke single-cylinder engine utilizing double overhead camshafts with four valves per cylinder, and a balance shaft to reduce vibration. The engine was manufactured by Kymco in Taiwan, on behalf of BMW. Like all modern BMW motorcycle engines, the G450X's engine features automotive-style closed-loop fuel injection, with exhaust oxygen-content sensor. The engine also features integrated coil-over-plug ignition, catalytic converter, and overrun cut-off functionality.

Unusually, the fuel injection/ignition system was not supplied by Bosch, but instead by the Japanese Keihin Corporation. This system is unique to the G450X, and carries BMW designation KMS-K16 (Keihin Management System, applicable to BMW model code K16).

Some technical compromises had to be made to accommodate the G450X's unusual clutch arrangement. One consequence is that the engine's crankshaft rotates backwards instead of forwards, as is typical. The engine is also angled forward at 30 degrees from the vertical to create space for the larger airbox.

The G450X was sold with a EURO 3 noise and emissions-compliant exhaust system that limits it to approximately 40 BHP. If an electronic coding plug supplied with the motorcycle is installed, a second competition-oriented engine management map is enabled. If the coding plug is installed in combination with BMW's G450X-specific Akrapovič competition exhaust muffler, engine power increases to approximately 51 BHP. Connecting the coding plug and/or installing the competition muffler renders the motorcycle not compliant with noise and emissions regulations; therefore, the motorcycle is not road-legal in this configuration.

== Clutch ==
With the design brief specifying both low weight and the improved handling brought by a longer swingarm, the required space was liberated by moving the multi-plate clutch to the right-hand side of the crankshaft. As a consequence, the clutch basket drives the gearbox, instead of the inner clutch hub as on other motorcycles. The drive plate/driven plate/clutch basket assembly is physically smaller than is typical, and the clutch assembly's crankshaft mounting partially negates the need for a separate flywheel. Following existing convention, the clutch is cable-operated and shares the same oil as the engine.

== Gearbox ==
The five-speed claw-shift transmission is integrated with the engine, and has an overall arrangement of gears, shafts and shift forks that was more compact than was typical. The engine and gearbox share a common oil supply.

On enduro bikes made by established competition, the front drive sprocket is located forward of the swingarm pivot, meaning that drive chain tension changes dynamically according to rear suspension movement. In turn, this means the drive chain must always incorporate a certain amount of slack. BMW solved this problem using its Coaxial Traction system, with the front drive sprocket located on the same rotational axis as the swingarm pivot. This is facilitated by the swingarm's locating shaft running through a hollow gearbox output shaft. This arrangement allows the drive chain to be run with minimal slack (around 5mm, as opposed to the typical 25 to 35mm). This reduces chain lash without danger of overstressing the gearbox output shaft bearings, and reduces overall stress on the gearbox assembly.

Although lighter in overall weight, the engine/gearbox arrangement has some inherent disadvantages. Mounting the clutch assembly on the crankshaft means the clutch rotates approximately three times faster than is typical, and the concentric location of the front drive sprocket and swingarm pivot means that the routine task of front drive sprocket replacement requires removal of the rear swingarm.

All G450Xs were supplied to customers with a 15-tooth front drive sprocket installed as standard. Models manufactured from 2010 onwards were supplied with additional 13-tooth and 14-tooth drive sprockets.

== Suspension ==
Although the G450X uses a fairly conventional suspension arrangement, the compact engine/gearbox assembly and concentric rear suspension arrangement allows for a longer-than-normal rear swingarm. The swingarm manipulates a high-quality Öhlins coil-over-shock strut directly, with no rising-rate linkage. The front suspension uses upside-down 45mm Marzocchi forks. The front and rear suspension are both adjustable for compression and rebound damping, although the rear shock absorber does not feature separate high-speed and low-speed compression damping adjustment.

== Electronics and fault diagnosis ==
Unlike many other BMW motorcycles manufactured during the same period, the G450X does not use CAN bus chassis management. Instead, it uses conventional wiring, switches, fuses and relays.

The G450X uses BMW Motorrad's proprietary 10-pin round diagnostic connector. The KMS-K16 engine management system is fully OBD-II enabled, with all conventional fault-diagnostic functions. The motorcycle is compatible with BMW's own workshop diagnostic equipment, and is also supported by the Hex Innovate GS-911 diagnostic module. The diagnostic connector is located on the left-hand main frame tube, behind and below the radiator.

== Brakes ==
Unlike the G650GS-derived G650X Challenge, the G450X does not have anti-lock braking (ABS). The G450X uses conventional disc brakes by Brembo, with a front twin-piston and rear single-piston calipers.

== Warranty ==
The G450X was sold in the United States with BMW's standard motorcycle warranty coverage of three years/36,000 miles, meaning its warranty far exceeded that of any other enduro motorcycle on the market at that time.

== Production ==
The G450X was produced between September 2008, and 2010.

== Legacy ==
The G450X utilized technological approaches that were considered radical by then-current enduro standards, and it failed to overcome the prejudices of buyers who expected more conventional technology. As a result, it did not meet with widespread acceptance. Its production run ended after only three years.

Following the end of the G450X's production run in 2010, its engine and frame formed the basis of three Husqvarna motorcycles from 2011 to 2014: the enduro-oriented TX449, the motocross-oriented TC449 and the rally raid-oriented TE449.

From 2010 to 2012, Husqvarna also offered an enlarged 501 cm3 version of the G450X engine. This was used in the Enduro-oriented TE511 and supermoto-oriented SMR511. Following KTM's acquisition of Husqvarna from the BMW Group in February 2013, all G450X-derived engines were dropped from the Husqvarna range.

The CCM GP450, manufactured from November 2014 until 2017, used a detuned version of the G450X engine.
