= BMW F800S =

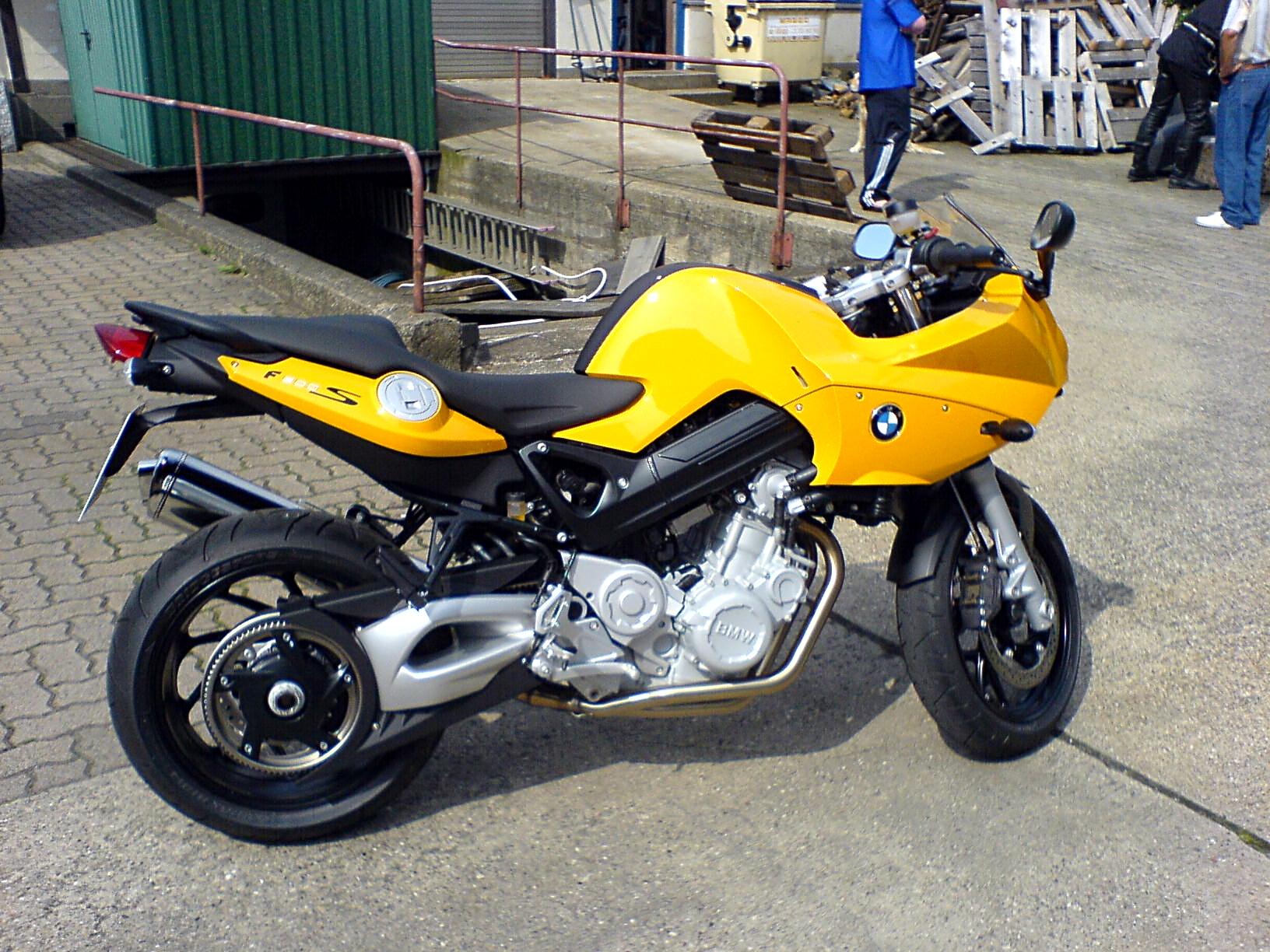
- Manufacturer: BMW Motorrad
- Production: 2006–2010
- Class: Sport bike
- Engine: Water-cooled four-stroke 798 cc (48.7 cu in) parallel twin built by Rotax, DOHC, 4-valves per cylinder
- Bore / stroke: 82 mm × 75.6 mm (3.23 in × 2.98 in)
- Power: 63.5 kW (85.2 hp) @ 8,000 rpm
- Torque: 86 N⋅m (63 lb⋅ft) @ 5,800 rpm
- Transmission: 6-speed, toothed belt drive
- Suspension: 43 mm telescopic fork (front), swing arm (rear)
- Brakes: Front: 2 disc, 4 piston caliper by Brembo; Rear: 1 disc, 1 piston caliper; ABS optional
- Tires: 120/70-ZR17, 180/55-ZR17
- Wheelbase: 1,466 mm (57.7 in)
- Dimensions: L: 2,082 mm (82.0 in); W: 1,155 mm (45.5 in); H: 860 mm (34 in)
- Seat height: 840 mm (33 in); 760 mm (30 in) with lowered seat and suspension
- Weight: 182 kg (401 lb) (dry); 204 kg (450 lb) (wet)
- Fuel capacity: 16.0 L (3.5 imp gal; 4.2 US gal)
- Related: F800GT, F800ST, F800R, F800GS, F700GS, F650GS

The F800S was a sport bike made by BMW Motorrad from 2006 to 2010. Along with the closely related sport touring F800ST, other bikes in the F-bike range are the dual-sport F800GS, and the naked F800R.

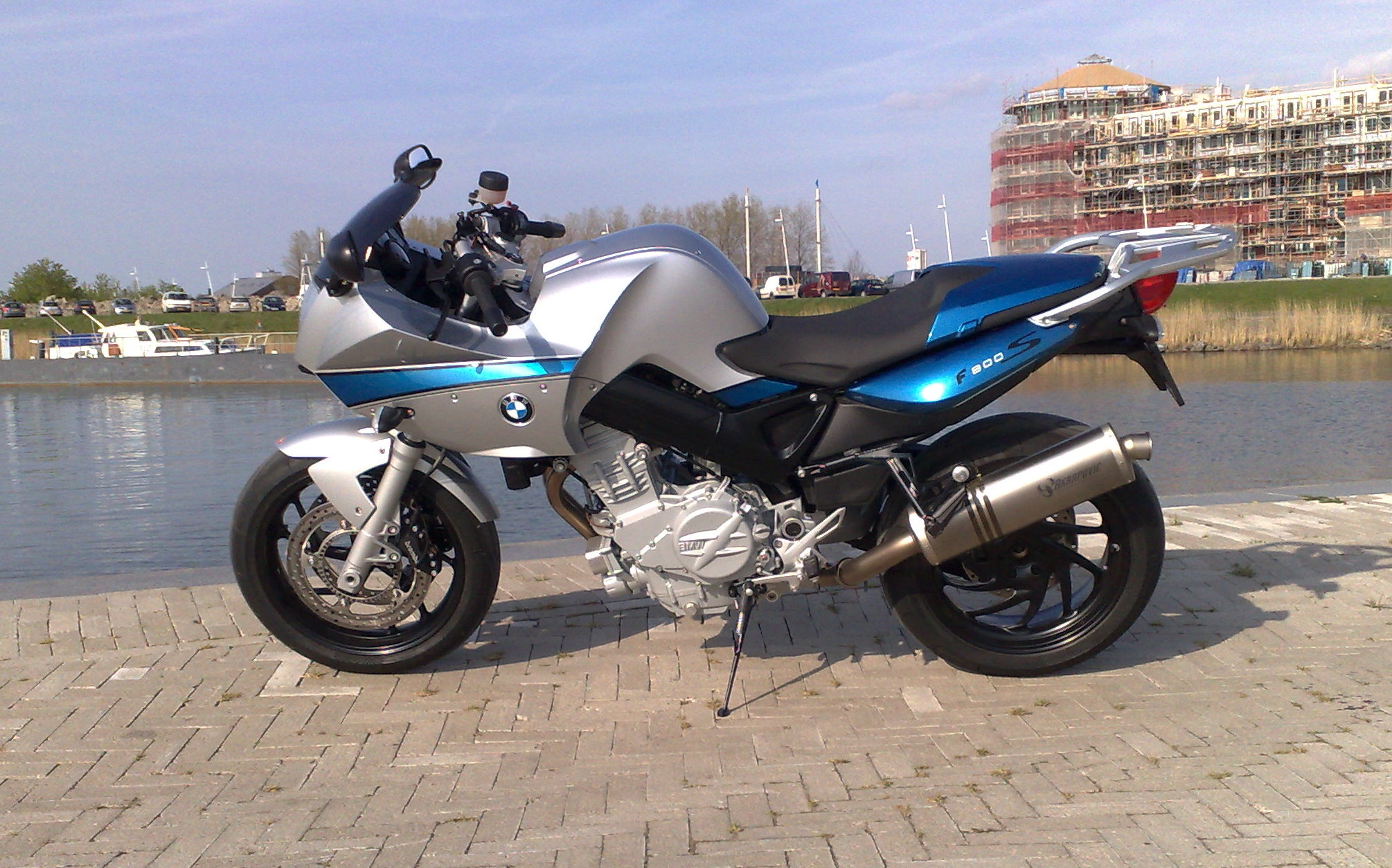
F 800 S, left side

BMW developed with Rotax a 798 cc (48.7 cu in) parallel-twin engine with a 360 degree firing order. This produced an exhaust note reminiscent of BMW's signature air-cooled boxer twins. However, this firing order required both pistons to move up and down at the same time. To counter the significant inertia produced by the pistons reciprocating, BMW devised a third vestigial connecting rod to a balance weight. The result was a parallel twin with significantly reduced vibration compared with other parallel twin engine designs. The engine was oiled by a dry sump system, and a soft ignition-cut rev limiter engaged at 9,000 rpm.

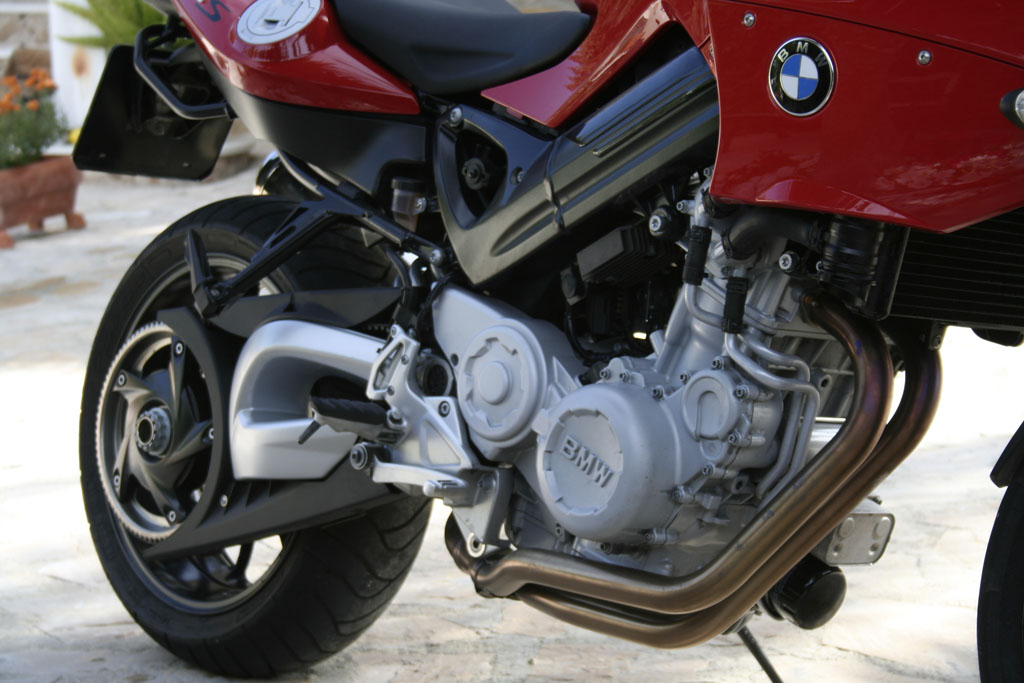
Closeup of engine and transmission

The engine was notable for early and powerful onset of torque. Chris Pfeiffer used a modified F800S before moving to his signature F800R, using the low-end power of the engine for stunting. BMW tuned the F800 series engine to run lean, typically with air-fuel ratios in the range of 15:1 to 16:1.

The F800S and ST both used low-maintenance belt drives and single sided swingarms. Bikes equipped with ABS also included a rear-wheel lift detection system.

In some markets, including the United States, the F800S was discontinued after the 2007 model year. The F800S was discontinued across most of the world after the summer of 2010 with only a few Central American and Eastern European countries still stocking the last supplies of the model.
