= BMW G 310 GS =

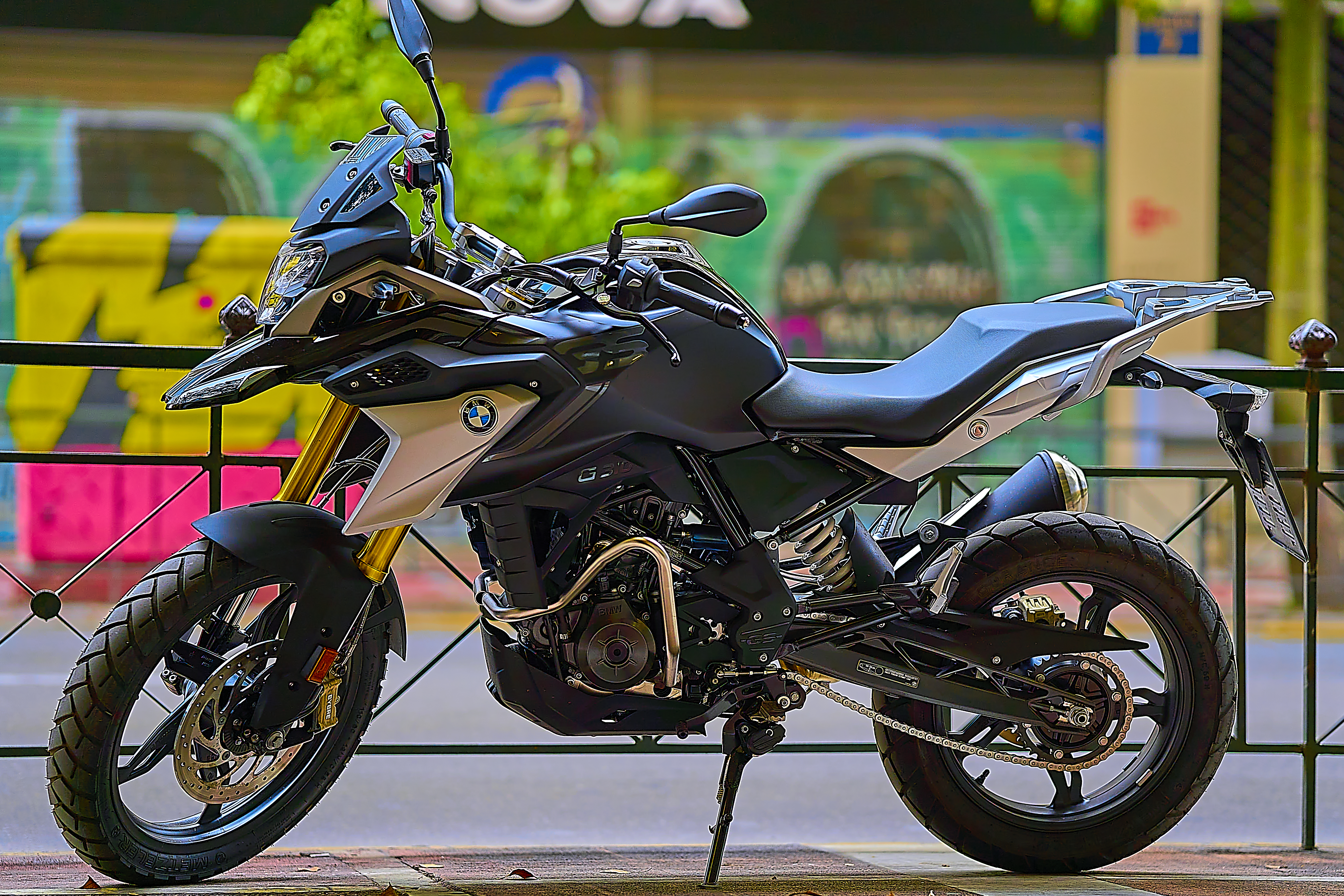
- Manufacturer: BMW Motorrad
- Also called: TVS Apache RTX
- Production: 2016-2025
- Assembly: Hosur, India; Manaus, Brazil
- Successor: BMW F450GS
- Class: Adventure motorcycle
- Engine: 313 cc (19.1 cu in) single
- Bore / stroke: 80.0 mm × 62.1 mm (3.15 in × 2.44 in)
- Compression ratio: 10.6:1
- Top speed: 143 km/h
- Power: 25 kW (33.6 bhp) @ 9,500 rpm (claimed)
- Torque: 28 N⋅m (21 lbf⋅ft) @ 7,500 rpm (claimed)
- Transmission: 6-speed
- Brakes: Front: 300 mm disc Rear: 240 mm disc
- Tires: Front: 110/80 R19; Rear: 150/70 R17
- Wheelbase: 1,420 mm (56 in)
- Dimensions: L: 2,075 mm (81.7 in); W: 880 mm (35 in); H: 1,230 mm (48 in)
- Seat height: 835 mm (32.9 in)
- Weight: 169.5 kg (374 lb) (claimed) (wet)
- Fuel capacity: 11 L (2.4 imp gal; 2.9 US gal)
- Related: BMW G 310 R

The BMW G 310 GS is a lightweight Adventure Touring motorcycle developed jointly by BMW and TVS Motor Company of India. It is a sister model of the BMW G 310 R.

== History ==
In 2013, BMW announced they were collaborating with motorcycle manufacturer TVS for production of a series of sub-500 cc bikes in Tamil Nadu. These motorcycles were targeted for developing markets, markets with prominence of lower displacement bikes, and as entry-level sport bikes in developed markets. This was the first time that BMW Motorrad ventured into developing the sub-500 cc bikes.

BMW K03 was the code-name given to the first collaborative product of BMW-TVS. It was a test bike which was developed in India and sent to Germany for further testing and modifications.

In October 2015 in Brazil, the BMW G 310 Stunt was the first concept bike unveiled by BMW Motorrad.

== Specifications ==
The BMW G 310 GS has a 313 cc (19.1 cu in) liquid-cooled four-stroke 4-valve single cylinder reverse-inclined DOHC engine, with a bore and stroke of 80.0 mm × 62.1 mm (3.15 in × 2.44 in). It has self start, static rev limiter, counterbalance shaft, wet sump, and electronic fuel injection and requires at least 91 RON petrol. It is compatible with up to 15% ethanol. The fuel capacity is 11 L (2.4 imp gal; 2.9 US gal).

It has a side-mounted inclined exhaust, a kickstand sensor, and a plastic skid plate.

The instrument panel consists of a monochrome LCD with onboard computer, a speedometer, a tachometer, a fuel gauge, a gear indicator, and a clock.

The graphics are implemented using decals.

It has a pillion seat and pillion footrests, but no pillion backrest. It also has a rear luggage rack.

The G 310 GS has a length of 2075 mm, width of 880 mm and height of 1230 mm, a wheelbase of 1420 mm, and a seat height of 835 mm. It has an upside down fork and a mono rear shock absorber with adjustable preload. The bike has a front 110/80 R19 and a rear 150/70 R17 Metzeler Tourance radial tubeless tyre and 5-spoke alloy rims. The braking of the bike features switchable dual-channel anti-lock braking system until the 2021 refresh, with the front using a single 300 mm disc, radially-bolted 4-piston fixed brake caliper and the rear using a single 240 mm disc, single-piston floating brake caliper. It also has an axial front master brake cylinder. The brakes are made by ByBre.

== 2021 facelift ==
Since 2021, it is Euro 5 compliant and has an unswitchable dual-channel anti-lock braking system Idle Speed Control, electronic throttle control, and an assist-and-slipper clutch, as well as adjustable levers, LED headlight and indicators.

== 2022 facelift ==
In 2022, one new color option was introduced at an ex-showroom price of ₹3.1 lakh (US$3,200) in India.
