= BMW F800R =

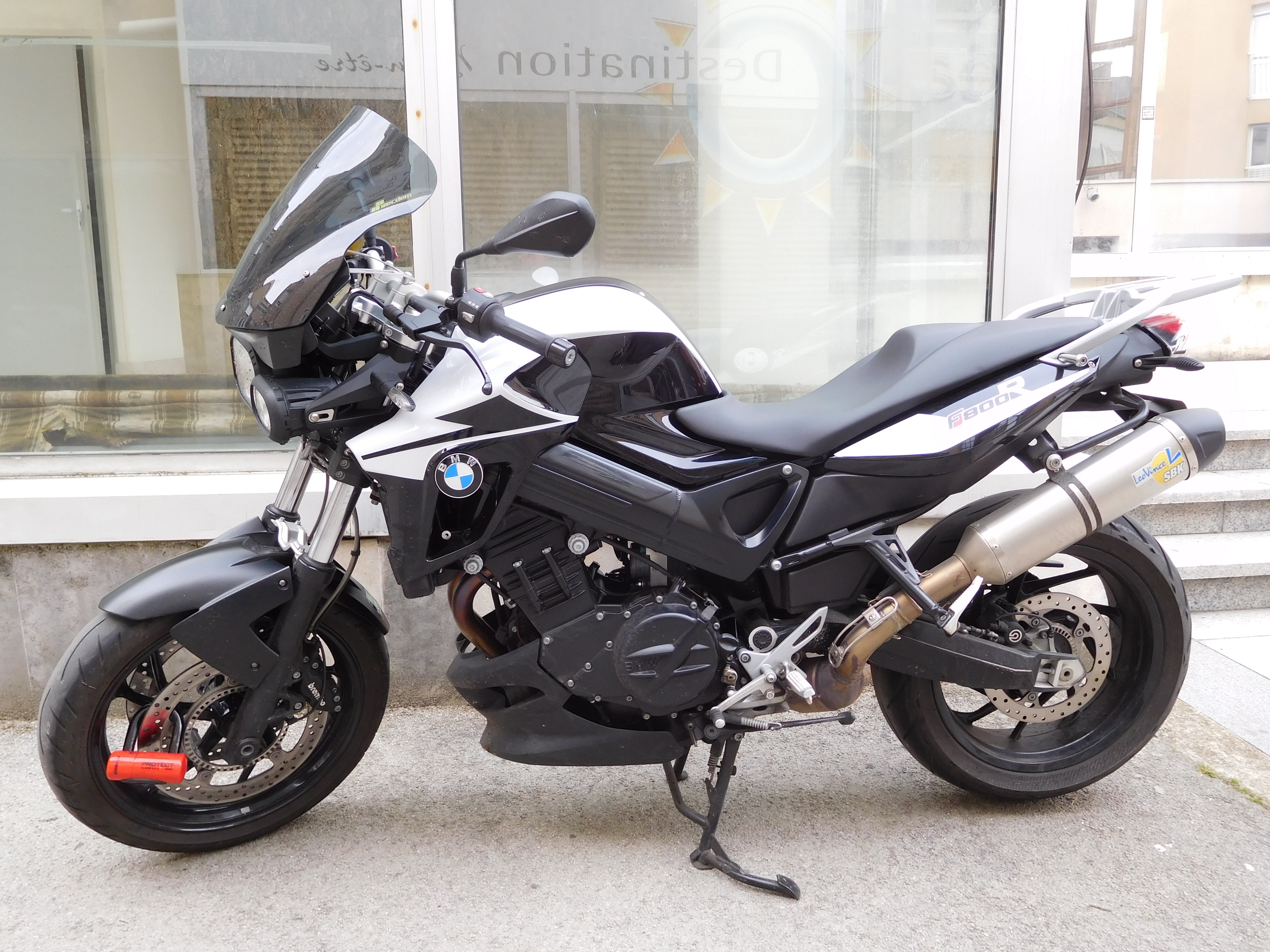
- Manufacturer: BMW Motorrad
- Production: 2009-2019
- Successor: BMW F900R
- Class: Naked
- Engine: 798 cc (48.7 cu in), Water-cooled, 2-cylinder, 4-stroke, four valves per cylinder, two overhead camshafts, dry sump lubrication, Engine Type 804 (BRP/Rotax)
- Bore / stroke: 82.0 mm × 75.6 mm (3.23 in × 2.98 in)
- Power: 64 kW (86 hp) @ 8,000 rpm
- Torque: 86 N⋅m (63 lb⋅ft) @ 6,000 rpm
- Transmission: 6-speed, endless O-ring chain
- Suspension: 43 mm telescopic fork (front), dual swing arm (rear)
- Brakes: Front: Twin disc, floating brake discs, diameter 320 mm, four-piston fixed calipers Brembo; Rear: Single disc, diameter 265 mm, single-piston floating caliper; ABS optional
- Tires: 120/70-ZR17, 180/55-ZR17
- Wheelbase: 1,520 mm (60 in)
- Dimensions: L: 2,145 mm (84.4 in); W: 905 mm (35.6 in); H: 1,160 mm (46 in)
- Seat height: 800 mm (31 in), low seat: 775 mm (30.5 in), high seat: 825 mm (32.5 in)
- Weight: 177 kg (390 lb) (dry); 199 kg (439 lb) (wet)
- Fuel capacity: 16.0 L (3.5 imp gal; 4.2 US gal)
- Related: F800GT, F800ST, F800S, F800GS, F700GS, F650GS

The BMW F800R is a naked motorcycle introduced by BMW Motorrad in 2009. The F-series also includes the F800S (discontinued), the dual-sport F800GS & F650GS, and the sport touring F800ST, which was replaced by the F800GT in 2013.

The F800R was first introduced when Streetbike freestyle World Champion, Chris Pfeiffer started using the custom bike for his tricks. Pfeiffer first started using a BMW F800S in January 2006, and eventually transformed the S into an R model to make the bike lighter and more suitable for stunt riding. In honor of Pfeiffer, BMW offered a limited edition of 68 Chris-Pfeiffer-Edition BMW F800R models with custom paintwork and an Akrapovič exhaust.

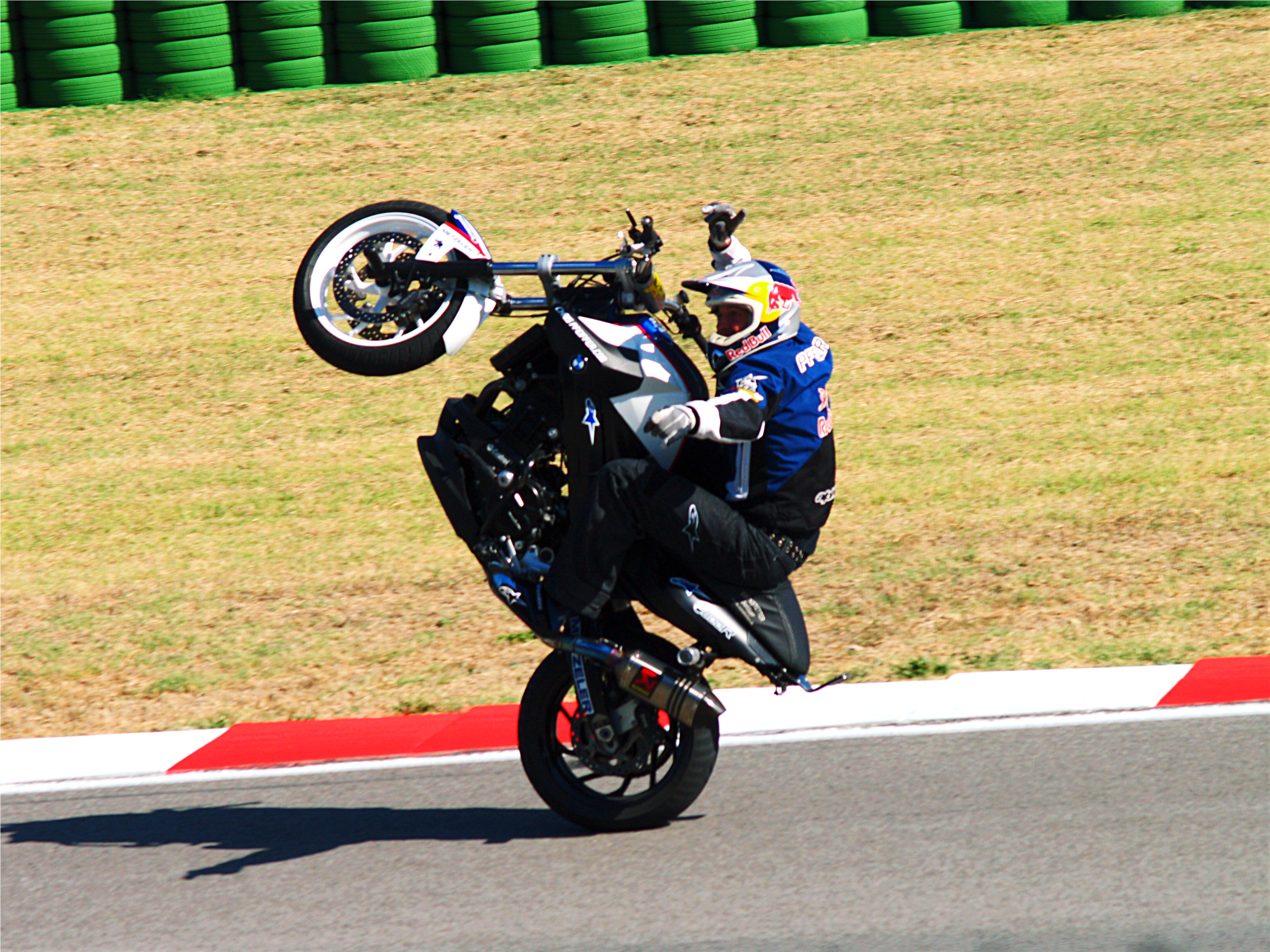
Chris Pfeiffer performs a stunt on the F800R
