= BMW F series parallel-twin =

Series of motorcycles built by BMW-Motorcycle

BMW F800GS, F800GSA, F700GS & F650GS
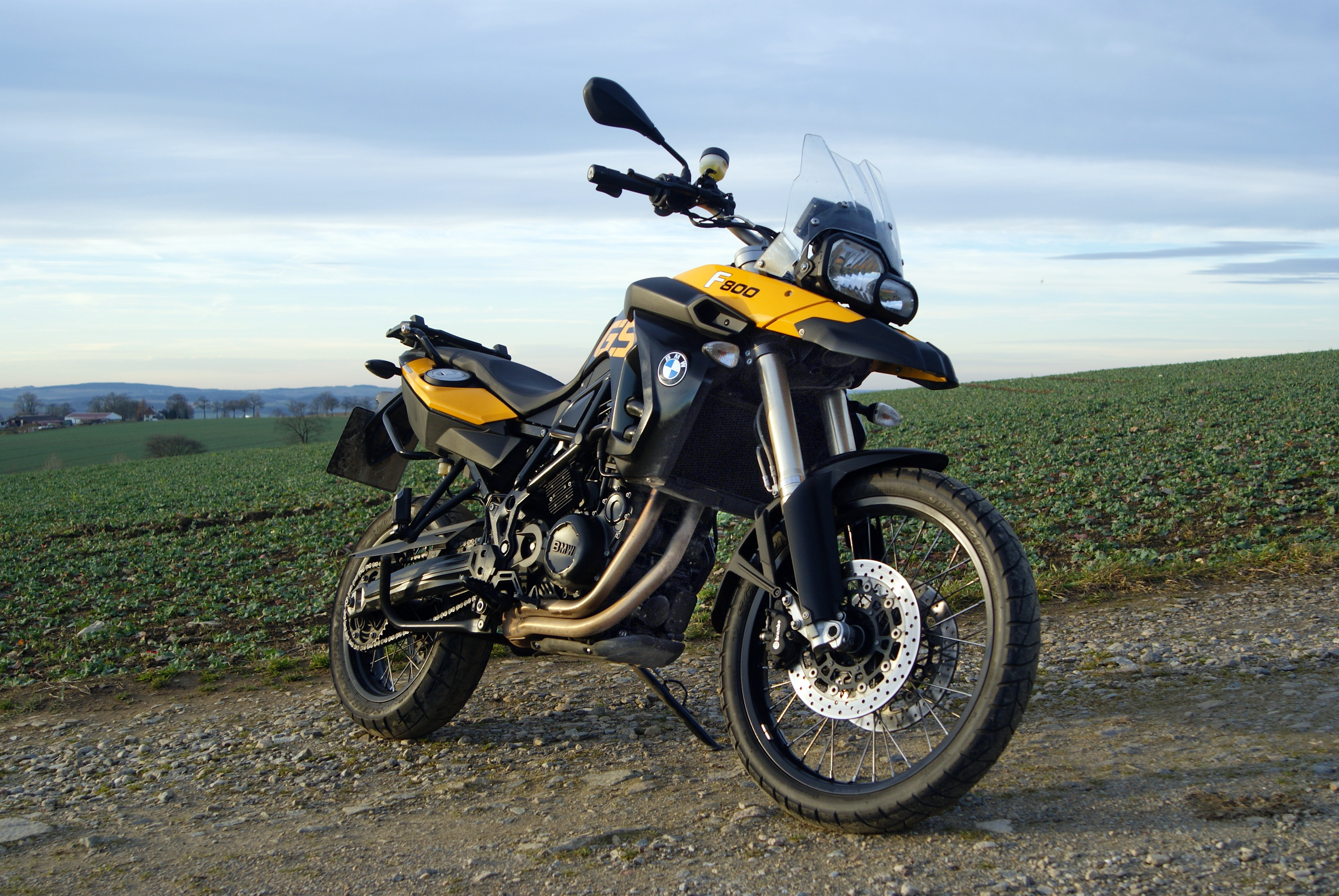
- Manufacturer: BMW Motorrad
- Production: F800GS (2008–19); F800GSA (2013–19); F700GS (2012–19); F650GS (2008–12)
- Predecessor: F650GS (single-cylinder)
- Successor: BMW F850GS
- Class: Dual-sport
- Engine: 798 cc (48.7 cu in), parallel-twin, water cooled, 4-stroke, DOHC, 8 valves
- Bore / stroke: 82 mm × 75.6 mm (3.23 in × 2.98 in)
- Compression ratio: 12.0:1
- Top speed: 200 km/h (120 mph) (F800); 192 km/h (119 mph) (F700); 185 km/h (115 mph) (F650)
- Power: 63 kW (85 hp) @ 7,500 rpm (F800); 56 kW (75 hp) @ 7,300 rpm (F700); 53 kW (71 hp) @ 7,000 rpm (F650)
- Torque: 83 N⋅m (61 lbf⋅ft) @ 5,750 rpm (F800); 77 N⋅m (57 lb⋅ft) @ 5,300 rpm (F700); 75 N⋅m (55 lb⋅ft) @ 4,500 rpm (F650)
- Transmission: 6-speed
- Suspension: Front: Telescopic fork, Ø 45mm, 230mm travel (F800); Telescopic fork, Ø 41mm, 170mm travel (F700); Telescopic fork, Ø 41mm, 180mm travel (F650); Rear: Dual swing arm, WAD strut, adjustable spring pre-load and rebound damping, 215mm travel (F800); Dual swing arm, spring strut, adjustable spring pre-load and rebound damping, 170mm travel (F700/650); Electronic Suspension Adjustment (ESA) optional (2013–)
- Brakes: Front: Twin 300mm floating discs, dual piston floating calipers (F800/700); Single 300mm floating disc, dual piston caliper (F650); Rear: 265mm disc, single piston floating caliper; ABS (optional before 2013)
- Tyres: Front: 90/90-21, spoked wheel, tubed tyre (F800); 110/80-19, cast aluminium wheel, tubeless tyre (F700/650); Rear: 150/70-17, spoked wheel, tubed tyre (F800); 140/80-17, cast aluminium wheel, tubeless tyre (F700/650)
- Wheelbase: 1,578 mm (62.1 in) (F800); 1,562 mm (61.5 in) (F700); 1,575 mm (62.0 in) (F650)
- Dimensions: L: 2,320 mm (91 in) (F800); 2,280 mm (90 in) (F700/650); W: 945 mm (37.2 in) (F800); 890 mm (35 in) (F700/650); H: 1,350 mm (53 in) (F800); 1,215 mm (47.8 in) (F700); 1,240 mm (49 in) (F650)
- Seat height: 880 mm (35 in) (F800); 820 mm (32 in) (F700/650)
- Weight: 191 kg (421 lb) (F800, 2013–); 185 kg (408 lb) (F800, 2008–12); 186 kg (410 lb) (F700); 179 kg (395 lb) (F650) (dry) 214 kg (472 lb) (F800, 2013–); 207 kg (456 lb) (F800, 2008–12); 209 kg (461 lb) (F700); 199 kg (439 lb) (F650) (wet)
- Fuel capacity: 16 L (3.5 imp gal; 4.2 US gal)
- Related: F800GT, F800ST, F800S, F800R, F900R

The BMW F series is a family of parallel-twin engine dual-sport motorcycles manufactured in Berlin, Germany by BMW Motorrad. Launched in 2008, the range comprises the F650GS, F700GS, F800GS, and F800GSA. In 2012, the F700GS replaced the discontinued F650GS, and in 2013, the F800GSA was introduced with a 24-litre (5.3 imp gal; 6.3 US gal) fuel tank and a larger front fairing and screen. The F800GT and F800S both have belt drive.

== Models ==
Contrary to industry convention, each model's "number" does not refer to the engine capacity. Instead, each bike in the F-series range uses essentially the same 798 cc (48.7 cu in) engine, but with different power outputs and equipment levels. The parallel-twin engine was first used in the F800S, and is also used in the F800GT, F800R and F800ST, although these bikes are tuned to deliver peak power at a different RPM from the GS models. The GS models have longer suspension travel, needed for offroad use.

The F650GS name causes further confusion as it was previously used for a 652 cc (39.8 cu in) BMW bike fitted with a single-cylinder Rotax engine. It was produced from 2000 to 2007, then relaunched in 2009 as the G650GS, fitted with a Chinese-assembled engine of the same 652 cc capacity.

All bike variants use the same basic engine. The F800 produces 85 hp (63 kW), which is 10 hp (7.5 kW) more power than the F700 and 14 hp (10 kW) more than the discontinued F650. Engines on both the F800 and F700 can be modified to deliver a reduced power output of 35 kW (47 hp) for European riders on restricted Category A2 licences.

The F800 and F700 are fitted with twin brake discs on the front while the F650 was fitted with one disc. Both bikes had anti-lock brakes (ABS), which were optional on the F800 before 2013 models and all years of the F650.

Previously, only the F650 had the option of lowered suspension, which was not available on F800 models up to 2012. From 2013, both the F800 and F700 can be specified with a low seat and/or lowered suspension, the combination of which reduces seat height to 820–850 mm (32–33 in) (F800) or 765–790 mm (30.1–31.1 in) (F700), and makes the bikes suitable for shorter riders.

== Special editions ==
=== F800GS Adventure (2013+) ===
Includes a larger 24 litre fuel tank, reinforced rear sub-frame.

=== F800GS Trophy (2012) ===
Desert Blue and Alpine White paintwork, Black and Rally Grey seat, aluminium engine guard plate and hand protectors with large spoilers.

=== F800GS Triple Black (2012) ===
Black paintwork, Black anodised fork tubes and rims, Granite Grey frame and Nürburg Silver swing arm.

=== F650GS Special Edition (2012) ===
Sun Yellow and Black Silk Gloss paintwork, Granite Grey fork tubes, wheels and frame, Nürburg Silver swing arm, plastic engine guard plate and high windscreen.

=== F800GS "30 Years GS" (2010) ===
Alpine White paintwork with white/blue/red decals, red seat with embossed GS logo, white direction indicators, aluminium engine guard plate, hand protectors with large spoilers, heated grips, onboard computer and tinted high windscreen.

=== F650GS "30 Years GS" (2010) ===
Alpine White paintwork with white/blue/red decals, red seat with embossed GS logo, white direction indicators, Magnesium painted wheels, plastic engine guard plate, hand protectors with large spoilers, and tinted high windscreen.

== 2013 update ==
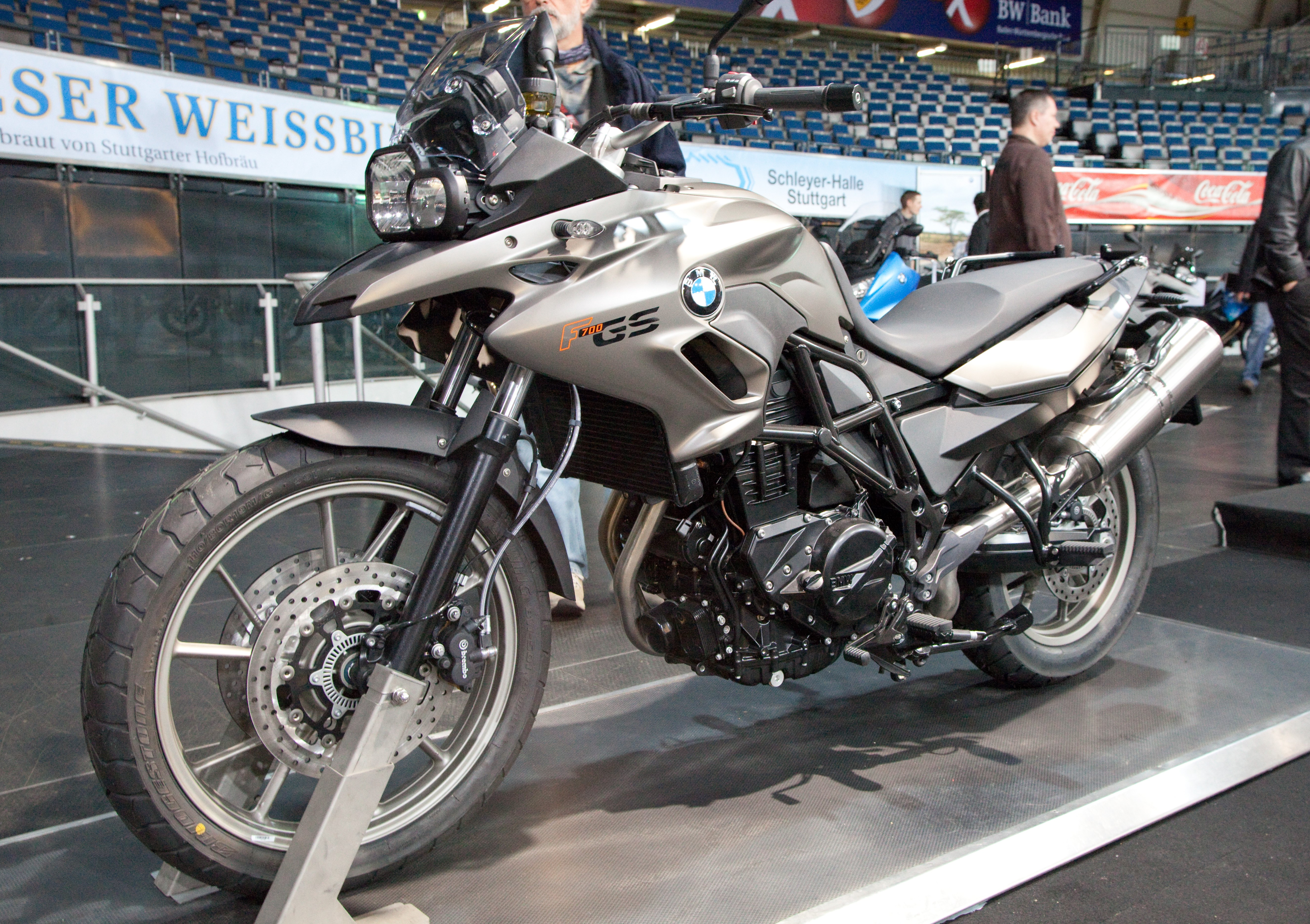
F700GS

The F800GS was refreshed for the 2013 model year, and the F700GS replaced the F650GS. Changes for 2013 included: power increase of 3.0 kW (4 hp) and 2 N⋅m (1.5 lbf⋅ft) on the F700 compared to the F650; standard ABS on all models and twin disc brakes on the F700; introduction of optional Electronic Suspension Adjustment (ESA) and Automatic Stability Control (F800 only); new generation handlebar switches and controls; updated instrument dials and standard fuel/temperature gauges; smoke grey turn indicators and rear LED light; new front fairings and paint finishes; and lowered suspension available for the first time on F800.
