= BMW 2 Series Active Tourer =

Compact luxury MPV

BMW 2 Series Active Tourer / Gran Tourer
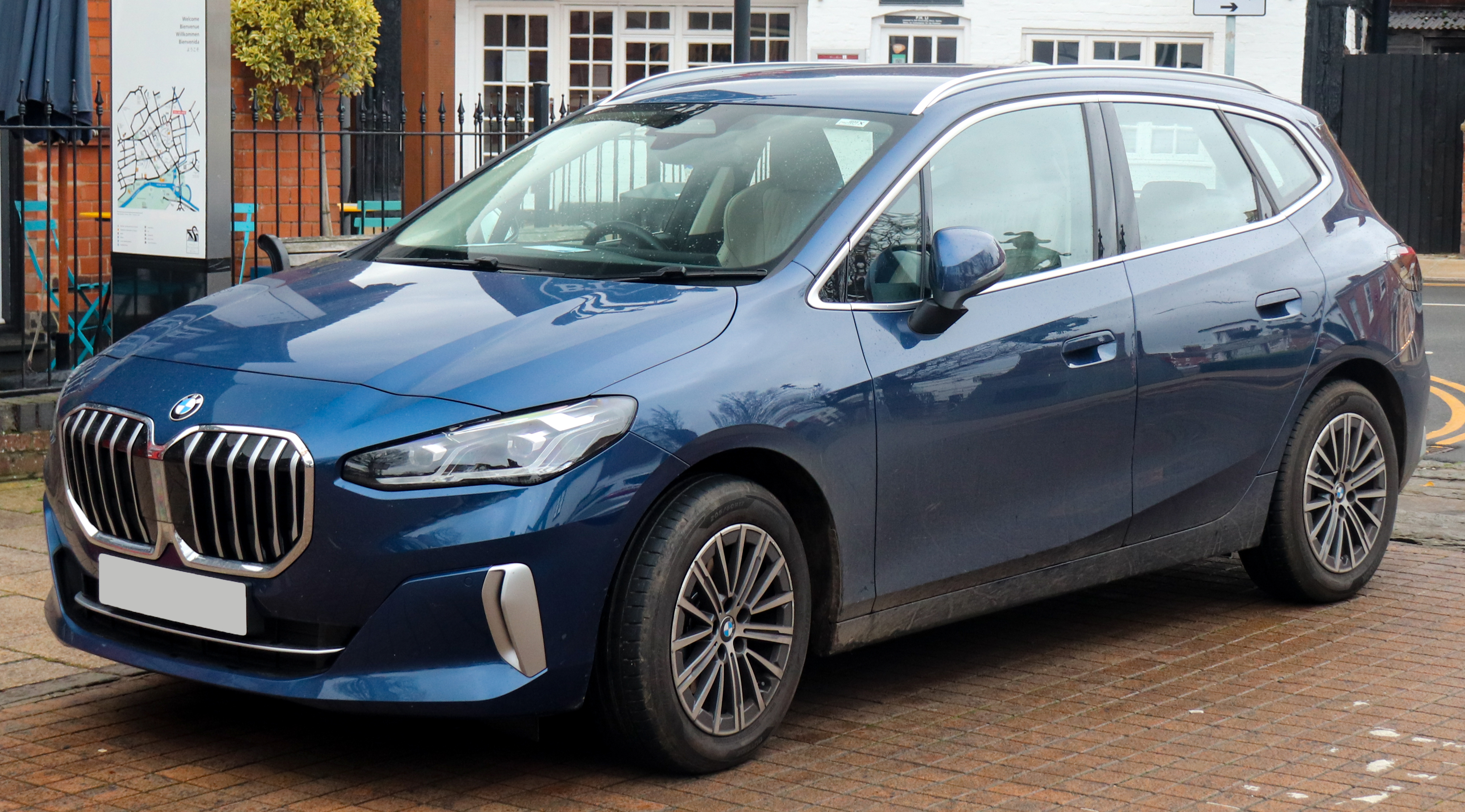
- 2022 BMW 220i Active Tourer Luxury

Overview
- Manufacturer: BMW
- Production: 2014–present

Body and chassis
- Class: Subcompact executive MPV (C,M)
- Body style: 5-door hatchback (Active Tourer); 5-door estate (Gran Tourer; 2014-2021)
- Layout: Front-engine, front-wheel-drive; Front-engine, all-wheel-drive (xDrive)

The BMW 2 Series Active Tourer (F45/U06 model code) is a two-row subcompact executive MPV produced by BMW since August 2014. The closely related BMW 2 Series Gran Tourer (F46 model code) is a longer three-row version which began production in 2015 and discontinued in 2021, now sold exclusively as a hatchback. Marketed as part of the 2 Series range, the F45/F46 are based on the front-wheel-drive UKL2 platform. The design is based on the BMW Concept Active Tourer, and is mechanically related to the Mini Countryman, also built by BMW. Just like the BMW 1 Series hatchback, the BMW 2 Series Active Tourer and Gran Tourer models were never available in the United States.

These vehicles are designed to compete directly with the Mercedes-Benz B-Class. Sales commenced in November 2014. An all-wheel-drive xDrive system is offered as an option.

== Pre-production concepts ==
=== BMW Concept Active Tourer (2012) ===
BMW Active Tourer is a plug in hybrid concept vehicle with 1.5-litre, turbo three-cylinder petrol engine derived from BMW's six-cylinder engines coupled with a synchronous electric motor, lithium-ion battery, High Reflection Silver body colour, front tilted BMW radiator grille, twin headlines with LED positioning lights (eyebrows) stretching far back into the side panels, multi faceted front apron, integrated door openers, contrasted side sills with rising shadow line, twenty inch wheels.

It also features rear light clusters running well into the side panel, a panorama sunroof with electronically adjustable brightness, 40:20:40 split rear backrests, centrally located vertical metal track is integrated in the back of the front seats, multifunction instrument display with 10.25-inch integrated screen, multicolour Head Up Display with brightness automatically adapts to the light available, navigation system with an eight-inch display, ECO PRO mode with coasting mode.

The vehicle was unveiled at the 2012 Paris Motor Show, followed by the 83rd Geneva International Motor Show in 2013, and Auto Shanghai 2013.

=== BMW Concept Active Tourer Outdoor (2013) ===
The Outdoor is a version of BMW Concept Active Tourer with the same, transversely mounted 1.5-litre petrol engine with front-wheel drive, plug-in hybrid with electric motor, Gold Race Orange body colour, MoonWhite and MoonRock Grey interior leather upholstery, a carrier system for two bicycles (integrated into the interior).

The vehicle was unveiled in 2013 OutDoor in Friedrichshafen, followed by the 2013 Frankfurt Auto Show, followed by the 2013 Tokyo Motor Show.

== First generation (F45/F46; 2014) ==
First generation
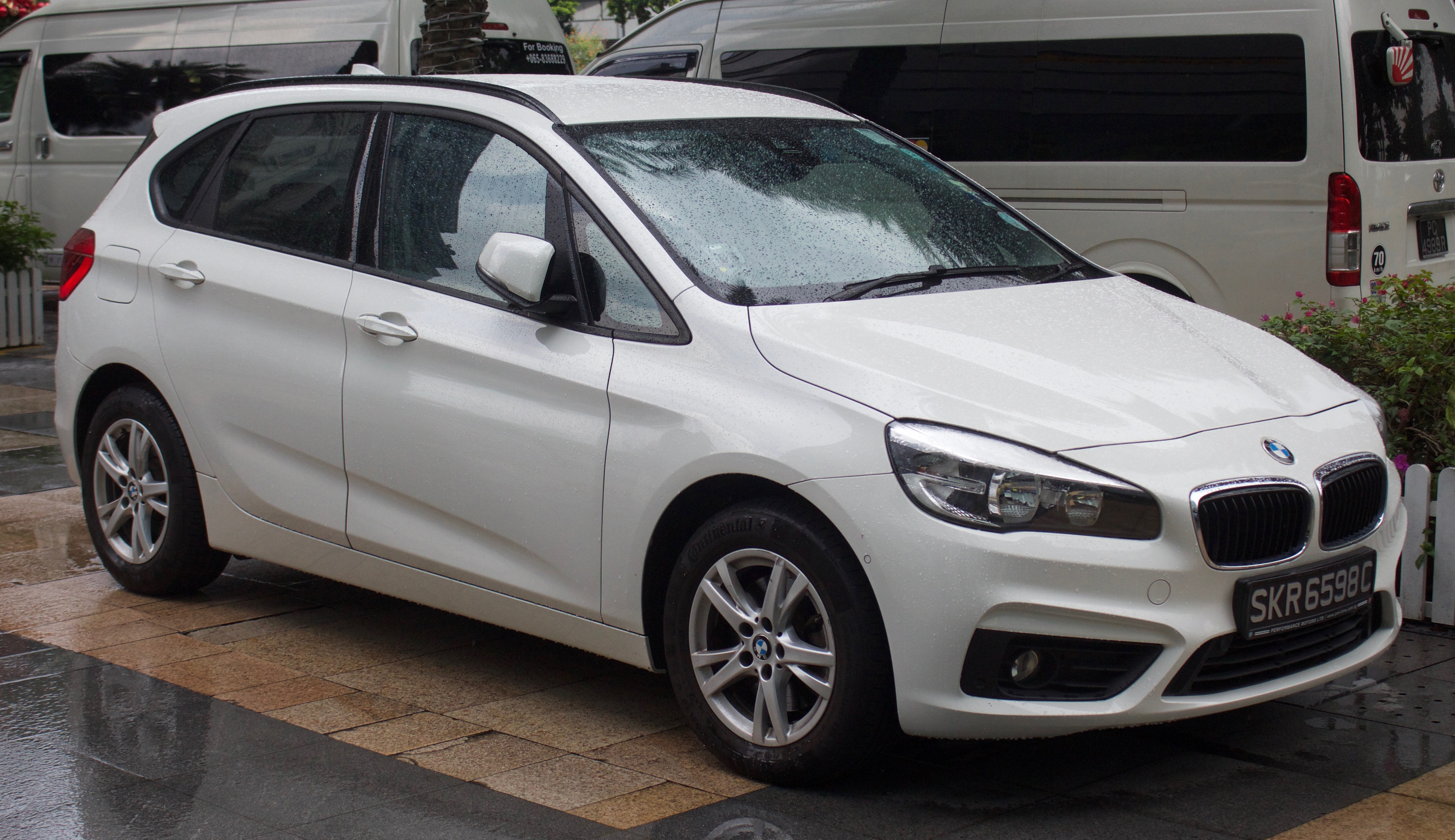
- 2016 BMW 218i Active Tourer

Overview
- Model code: F45 (Active Tourer); F46 (Gran Tourer)
- Production: 2014–2021
- Assembly: Germany: Leipzig (BMW Leipzig Plant, F45); Regensburg (F46); China: Tiexi, Shenyang (BBA, F45 only)
- Designer: Michael de Bono

Body and chassis
- Platform: BMW UKL2 platform
- Related: BMW 1 Series (F52); BMW X1 (F48); BMW X2 (F39); Mini Countryman (F60); Mini Clubman (F54)

Powertrain
- Engine: Petrol: 1.5 L B38 turbo I3; 2.0 L B48 turbo I4; Petrol plug-in hybrid: 1.5 L B38A15M0 turbo I3; Diesel: 1.5 L B37 turbo I3; 2.0 L B47 turbo I4
- Electric motor: 65 kW (87 hp) permanent-magnet synchronous motor (PHEV)
- Transmission: 6-speed Getrag manual; 6-speed Aisin TF-60SN automatic; 7-speed Magna 7DCT300 M-DCT dual-clutch; 6-speed Aisin TF-60SN Steptronic (225xe); 8-speed Aisin AWF8F automatic
- Hybrid drivetrain: PHEV (225xe)
- Battery: Lithium-ion high-voltage (7.7 kWh; 2017 / 10.0 kWh; 2020)

Dimensions
- Wheelbase: 2,670 mm (105.1 in) (Active Tourer); 2,780 mm (109.4 in) (Gran Tourer)
- Length: 4,342–4,354 mm (170.9–171.4 in) (Active Tourer); 4,556 mm (179.4 in) (Gran Tourer)
- Width: 1,800 mm (70.9 in)
- Height: 1,555 mm (61.2 in) (Active Tourer); 1,641 mm (64.6 in) (Gran Tourer)
- Curb weight: 1,415–1,735 kg (3,119.5–3,825.0 lb) (Active Tourer); 1,475–1,640 kg (3,251.8–3,615.6 lb) (Gran Tourer)

=== BMW 2 Series Active Tourer (F45) ===
The vehicle was unveiled in the 84th Geneva International Motor Show 2014, followed by the 2014 Canadian International Auto Show, 13th Beijing International Automotive Exhibition 2014, and 22nd Auto Mobil International Leipzig 2014. The 2 Series Active Tourer was supposed to be called the BMW 1 Series Gran Turismo before it was launched.

Early models included 218i, 225i, 218d (150PS). 220d (190PS) was set to arrive in September 2014, followed by 220i (192PS) in November 2014.

Early models for the United Kingdom included 218i (100 kW), 218d (120 kW). From November 2014, M Sport specification (including 18 inch M Sport alloy wheels, Dakota leather upholstery, High gloss Shadowline exterior trim, Aluminium hexagon interior trim, M Sport aerodynamic styling, M Sport suspension and M Sport interior styling enhancements) becomes available.

BMW 2 Series Active Tourer M Sport Package includes exclusive Estoril Blue body colour, M Aerodynamics package, M Sport suspension, 17 or 18-inch M light alloy wheels, M leather steering wheel. The 225i Active Tourer with M Sport Package was unveiled in the 2014 Geneva Motor Show.

Production at the BMW Brilliance plant in Shenyang, China started in Q1 of 2016, with the first sales recorded in March. Chinese market only got the 218i and 220i variant. The Chinese version has different engines names the 218i has the B38A15A 1,499 cc (91.5 cu in) I3 single-scroll turbo with 100 kW (136 PS; 134 hp), mated to a six-speed automatic gearbox. The 220i has a 1,998 cc (121.9 cu in) I4 twin scroll turbo with 141 kW (192 PS; 189 hp) and an eight speed automatic gearbox.

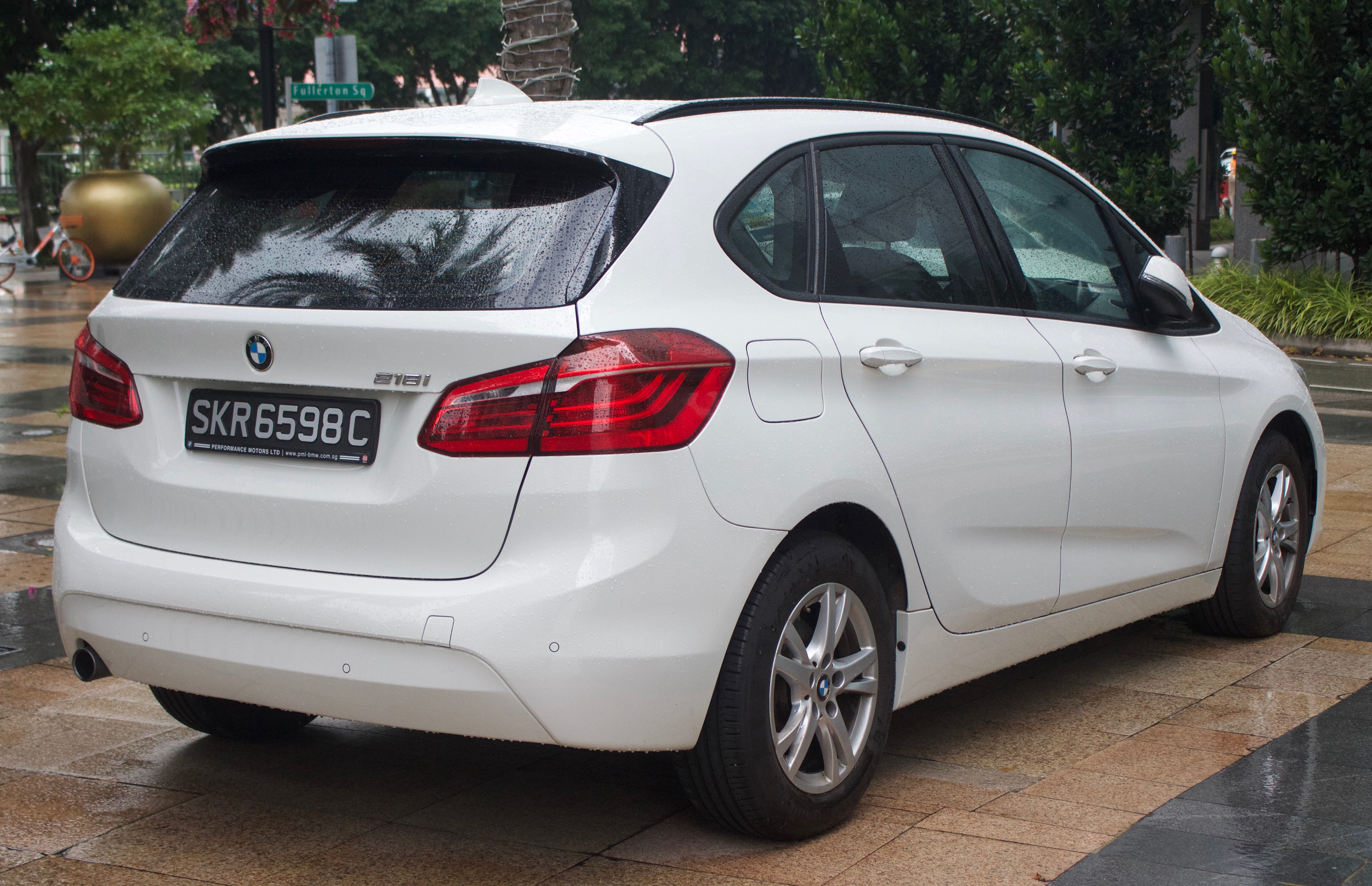
2015 BMW 218i (F45) Active Tourer (pre-facelift)

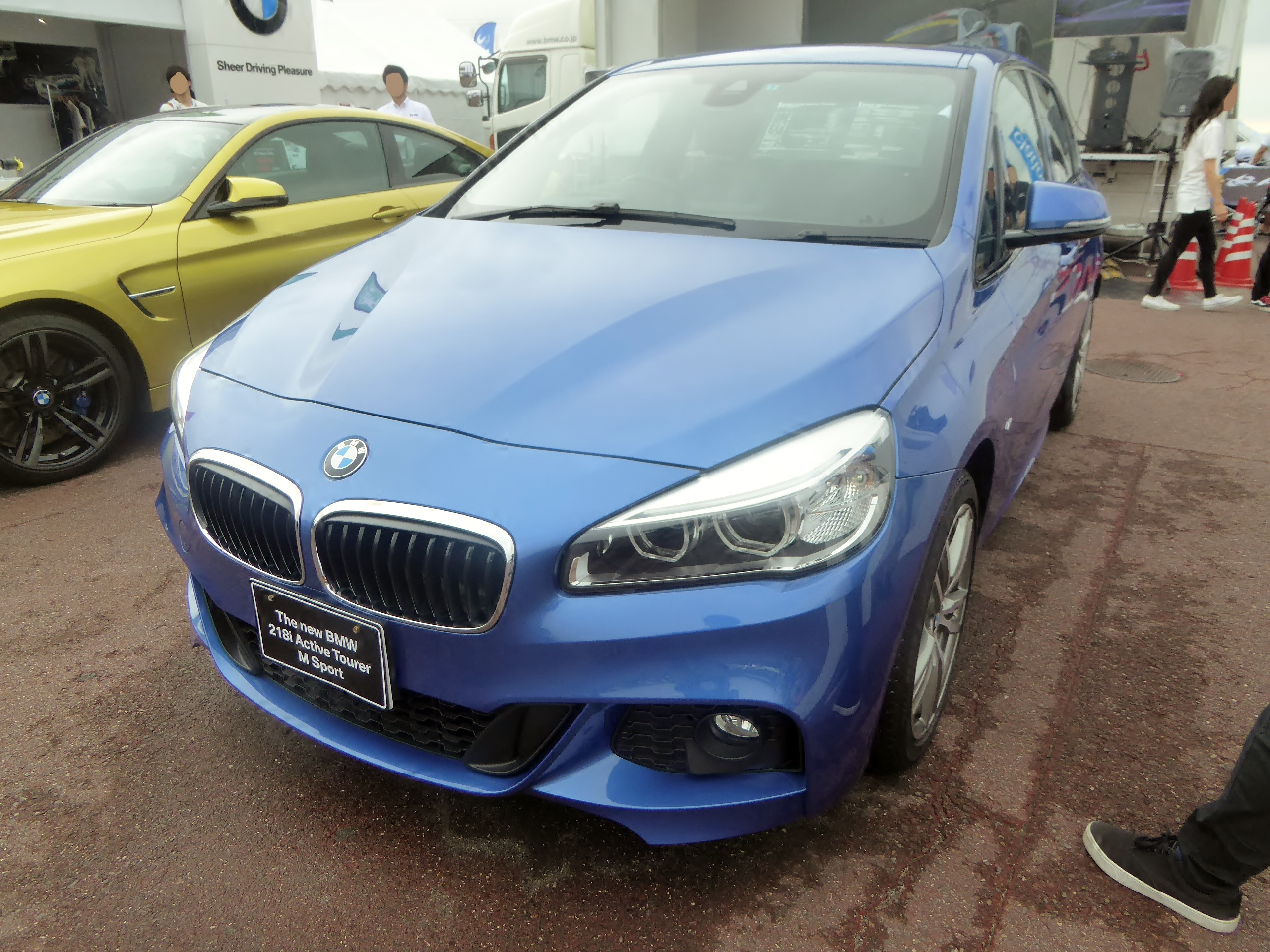
BMW 218i Active Tourer M-Sport

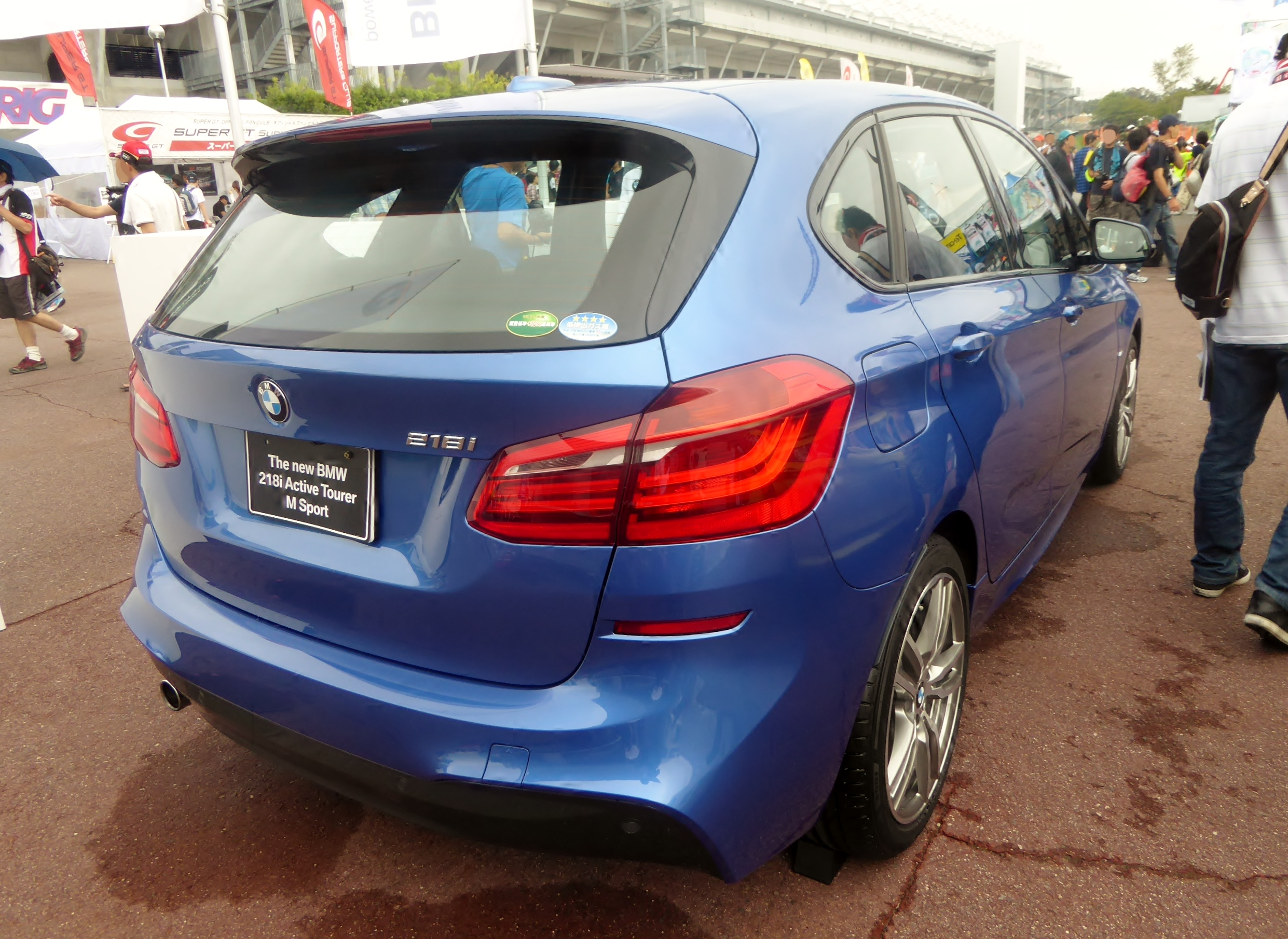
BMW 218i Active Tourer M-Sport

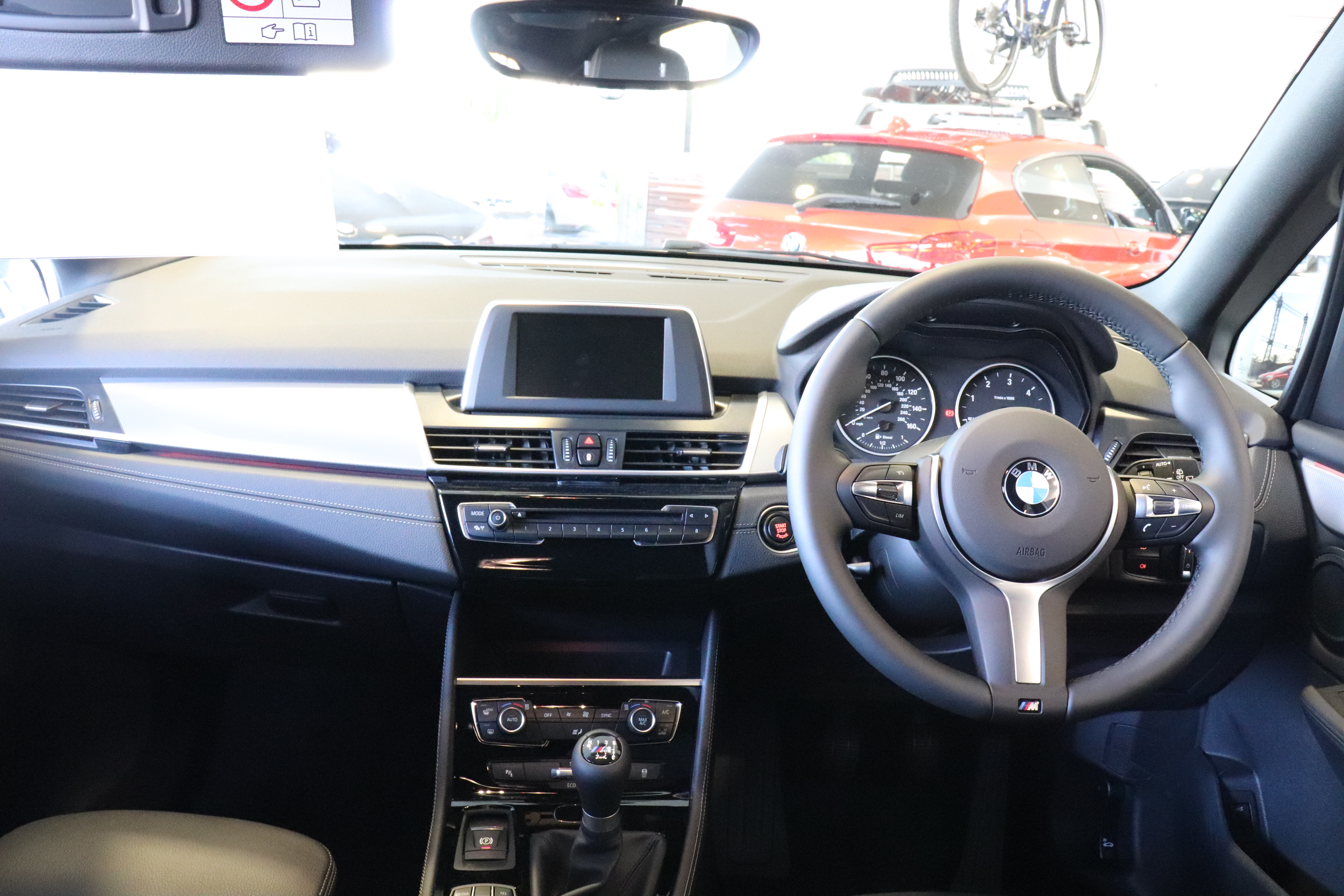
Interior

=== BMW 2 Series Gran Tourer (F46) ===
The 2 Series Gran Tourer is a long wheelbase, three-row version, which was released in June 2015. It is the first and the only three-row MPV ever produced by BMW. Compared to the Active Tourer, its wheelbase is lengthened by 110 mm (4.3 in) to 2,780 mm (109.4 in) in order to fit the third-row seating, which folds flat. A two-row version is also offered as the base option for some models. At launch, the vehicle was offered with Advantage, Sport Line, Luxury Line and M Sport trim levels in Europe.

A 645 L (22.8 cu ft) of cargo space is available in the standard five-seat variant, which can be expanded to 805 L (28.4 cu ft) by sliding the rear seats forward. With the third-row seating option, the boot space decreases to 560 L (19.8 cu ft) with the last row folded down flat to the floor.

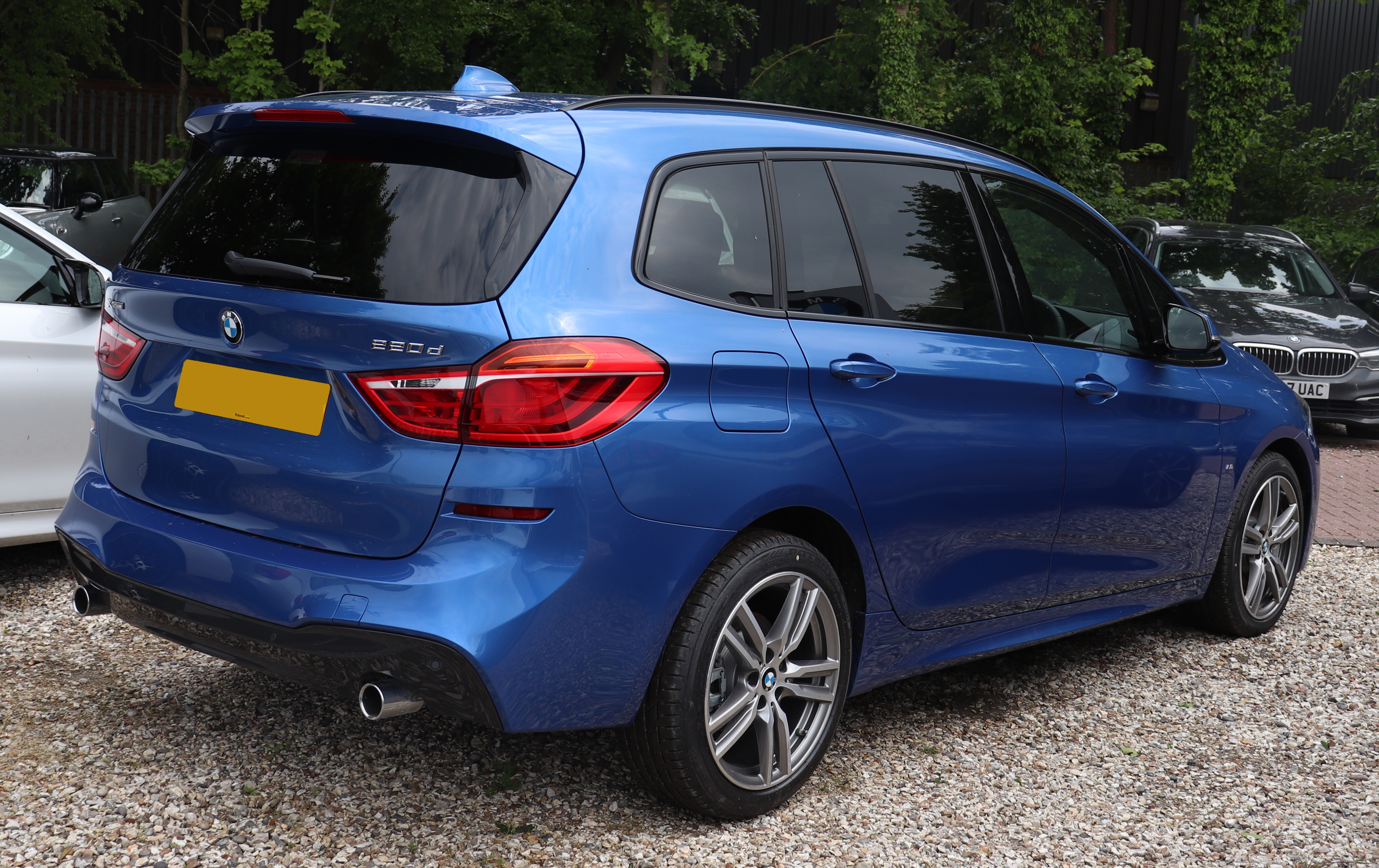
Gran Tourer (M-Sport; pre-facelift)

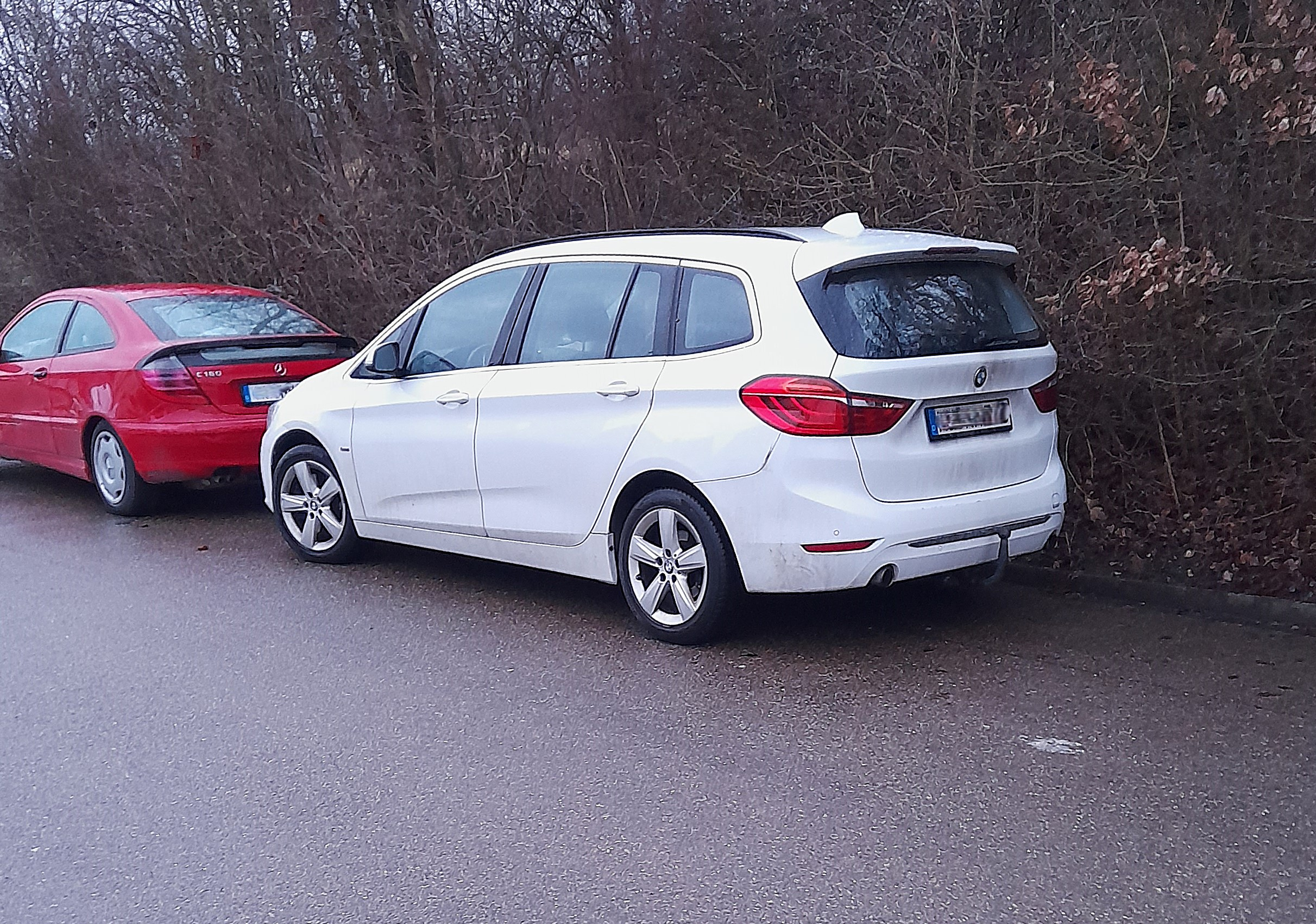
Gran Tourer (pre-facelift)

=== Engines ===
Petrol engines
Model	Years	Type/code	Power, torque at rpm
216i	2016–2018	1,499 cc (91.5 cu in) I3 single-scroll turbo (B38A15U0)	75 kW (102 PS; 101 hp) at 4,100–6,000 rpm, 180 N⋅m (133 lb⋅ft) at 1,200–3,800 rpm
216i	2018–2021	1,499 cc (91.5 cu in) I3 single-scroll turbo (B38A15U1)	80 kW (109 PS; 107 hp) at 4,300–6,500 rpm, 190 N⋅m (140 lb⋅ft) at 1,380–3,800 rpm
218i	2014–2018	1,499 cc (91.5 cu in) I3 single-scroll turbo (B38A15M0)	100 kW (136 PS; 134 hp) at 4,400–6,000 rpm, 220 N⋅m (162 lb⋅ft) at 1,250–4,300 rpm
218i	2018-2020	1,499 cc (91.5 cu in) I3 single-scroll turbo (B38A15M1)	103 kW (140 PS; 138 hp) at 4,500–6,500 rpm, 220 N⋅m (162 lb⋅ft) at 1,480–4,200 rpm
218i	2020–2021	1,499 cc (91.5 cu in) I3 single-scroll turbo (B38A15M1)	100 kW (136 PS; 134 hp) at 4,500–6,500 rpm, 220 N⋅m (162 lb⋅ft) at 1,500–4,100 rpm
220i	2014–2018	1,998 cc (121.9 cu in) I4 twin-scroll turbo (B48A20M0)	141 kW (192 PS; 189 hp) at 5,000–6,000 rpm, 280 N⋅m (207 lb⋅ft) at 1,250–4,600 rpm
220i	2018–2020	1,998 cc (121.9 cu in) I4 twin-scroll turbo (B48A20M1)	141 kW (192 PS; 189 hp) at 5,000–6,500 rpm, 280 N⋅m (207 lb⋅ft) at 1,350–4,600 rpm
220i	2020–2021	1,998 cc (121.9 cu in) I4 twin-scroll turbo (B48A20M1)	131 kW (178 PS; 176 hp) at 5,000–5,500 rpm, 280 N⋅m (207 lb⋅ft) at 1,350–4,200 rpm
225i	2014–2021	1,998 cc (121.9 cu in) I4 twin-scroll turbo (B48A20O0)	170 kW (231 PS; 228 hp) at 4,750–6,000 rpm, 350 N⋅m (258 lb⋅ft) at 1,350–4,500 rpm
225xe PHEV	2016–2018	1,499 cc (91.5 cu in) I3 twin-scroll turbo (B38A15M0 Hybrid) + electric motor	100 kW (136 PS; 134 hp) at 4,400–6,000 rpm, 220 N⋅m (162 lb⋅ft) at 1,250–4,300 rpm (Engine); 65 kW (88 PS; 87 hp), 165 N⋅m (122 lb⋅ft) (Electric Motor); 165 kW (224 PS; 221 hp), 385 N⋅m (284 lb⋅ft) (Combined)
225xe PHEV	2018–2020	1,499 cc (91.5 cu in) I3 twin-scroll turbo (B38A15M0 Hybrid) + electric motor	100 kW (136 PS; 134 hp) at 4,400–6,000 rpm, 220 N⋅m (162 lb⋅ft) at 1,300–4,300 rpm (Engine); 65 kW (88 PS; 87 hp), 165 N⋅m (122 lb⋅ft) (Electric Motor); 165 kW (224 PS; 221 hp), 385 N⋅m (284 lb⋅ft) (Combined)
225xe PHEV	2020–2021	1,499 cc (91.5 cu in) I3 twin-scroll turbo (B38A15M0 Hybrid) + electric motor	92 kW (125 PS; 123 hp) at 5,000–5,500 rpm, 220 N⋅m (162 lb⋅ft) at 1,500–3,800 rpm (Engine); 70 kW (95 PS; 94 hp), 165 N⋅m (122 lb⋅ft) (Electric Motor); 162 kW (220 PS; 217 hp), 385 N⋅m (284 lb⋅ft) (Combined)

Diesel engines
Model	Years	Type/code	Power, torque at rpm
214d	2014–2018	1,496 cc (91.3 cu in) I3 turbo (B37C15)	70 kW (95 PS; 94 hp) at 4,000 rpm, 220 N⋅m (162 lb⋅ft) at 1,750–2,250 rpm
216d	2014–2021	1,496 cc (91.3 cu in) I3 turbo (B37C15)	85 kW (116 PS; 114 hp) at 4,000 rpm, 270 N⋅m (199 lb⋅ft) at 1,750–2,250 rpm
218d	2014–2018	1,995 cc (121.7 cu in) I4 turbo (B47C20)	110 kW (150 PS; 148 hp) at 4,000 rpm, 330 N⋅m (243 lb⋅ft) at 1,750–2,250 rpm
218d	2018–2021	1,995 cc (121.7 cu in) I4 turbo (B47C20)	110 kW (150 PS; 148 hp) at 4,000 rpm, 350 N⋅m (258 lb⋅ft) at 1,750–2,500 rpm
220d	2014–2021	1,995 cc (121.7 cu in) I4 turbo (B47C20)	140 kW (190 PS; 188 hp) at 4,000 rpm, 400 N⋅m (295 lb⋅ft) at 1,750–2,500 rpm

=== Facelift ===
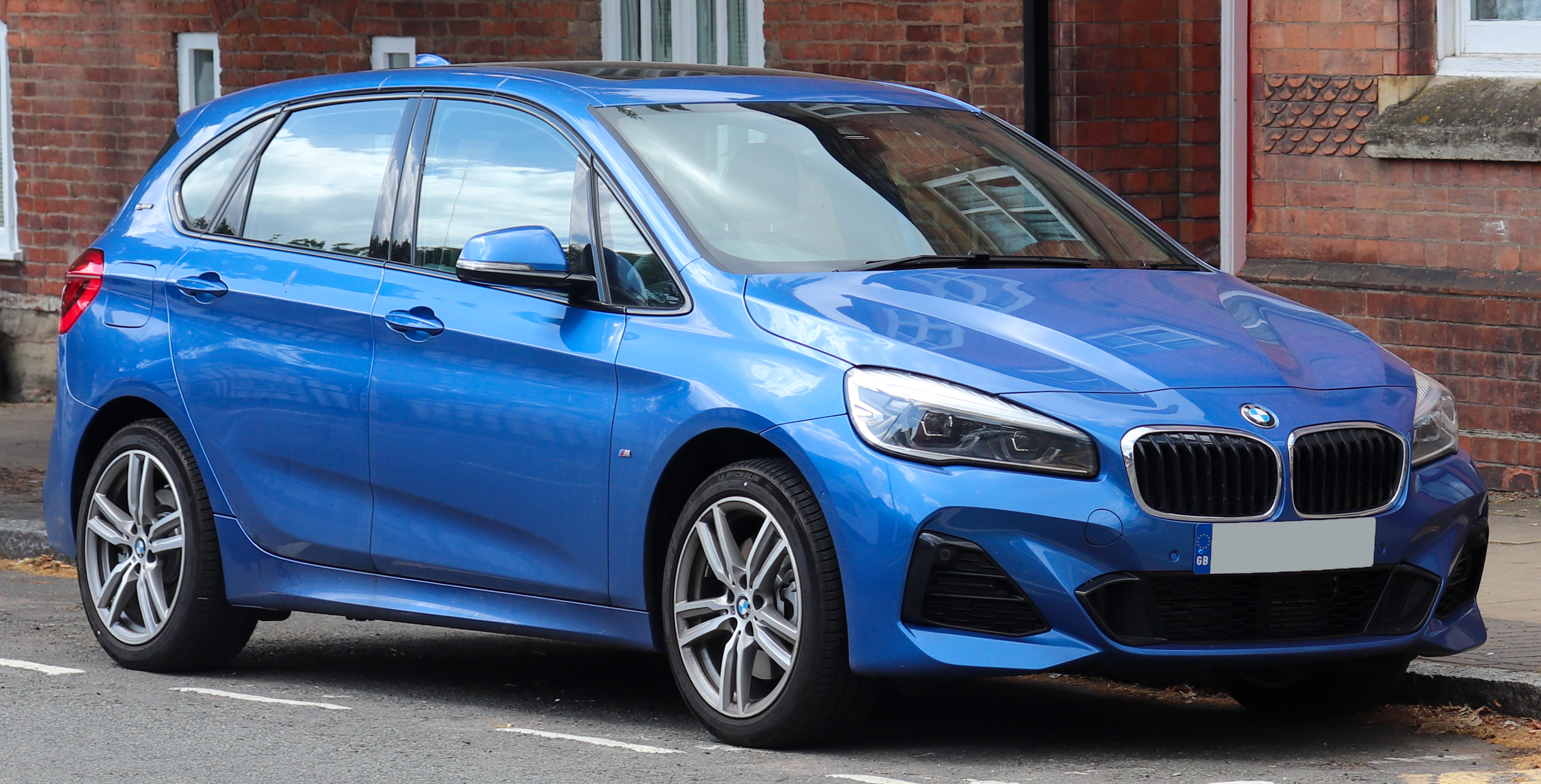
2019 BMW 225xe Active Tourer M Sport Premium

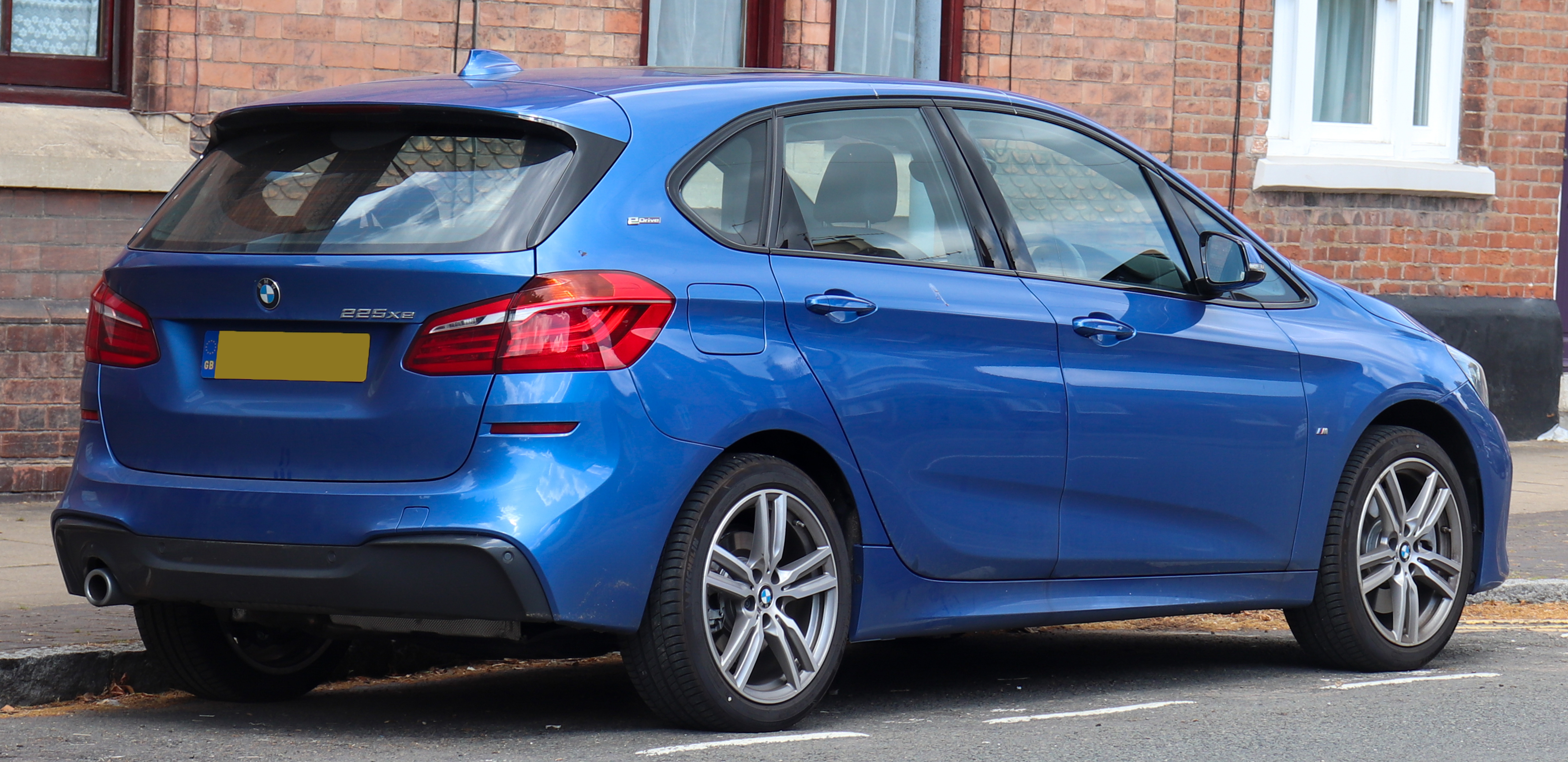
2019 BMW 225xe Active Tourer M Sport Premium

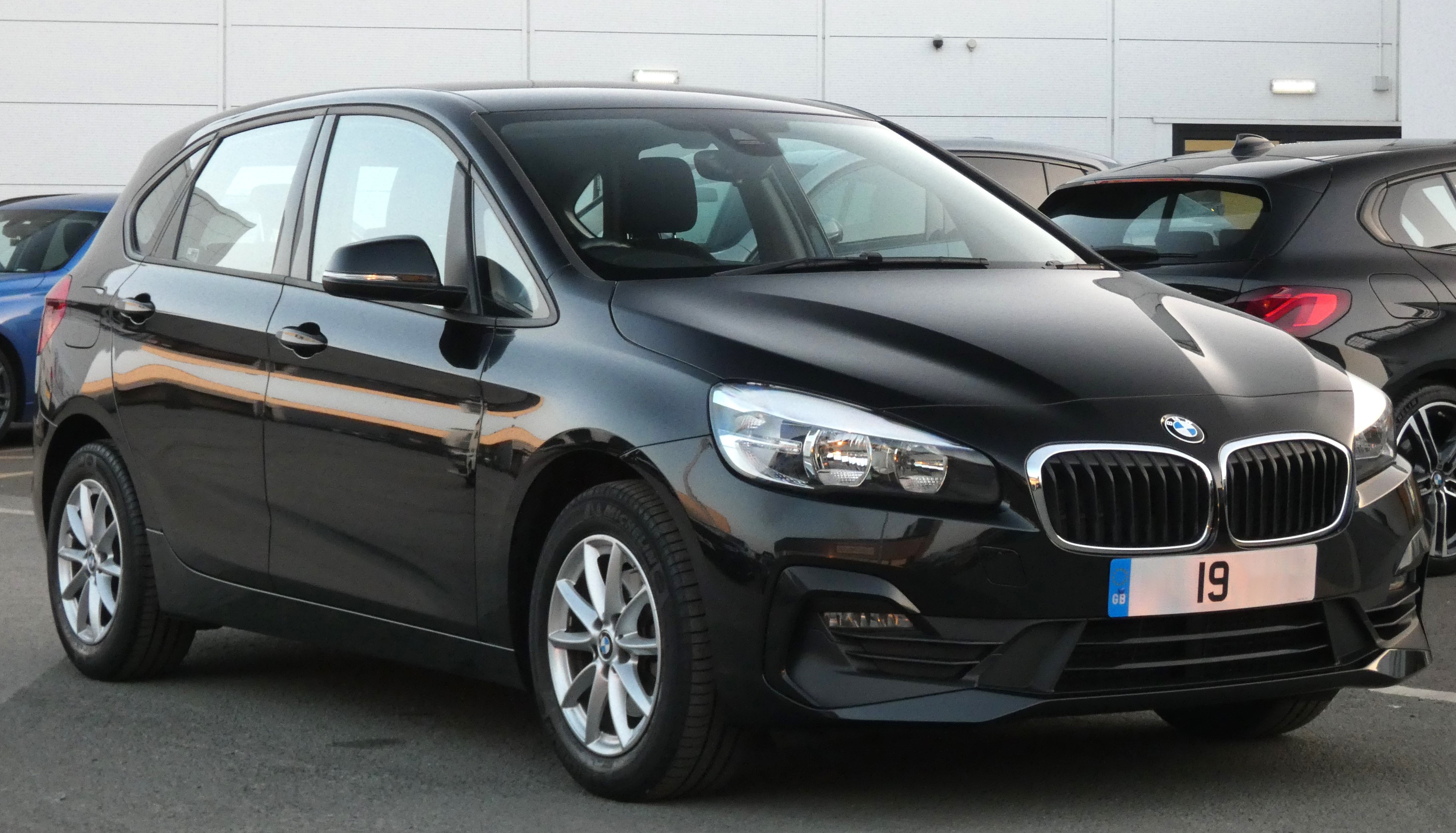
2019 BMW 218i SE Active Tourer

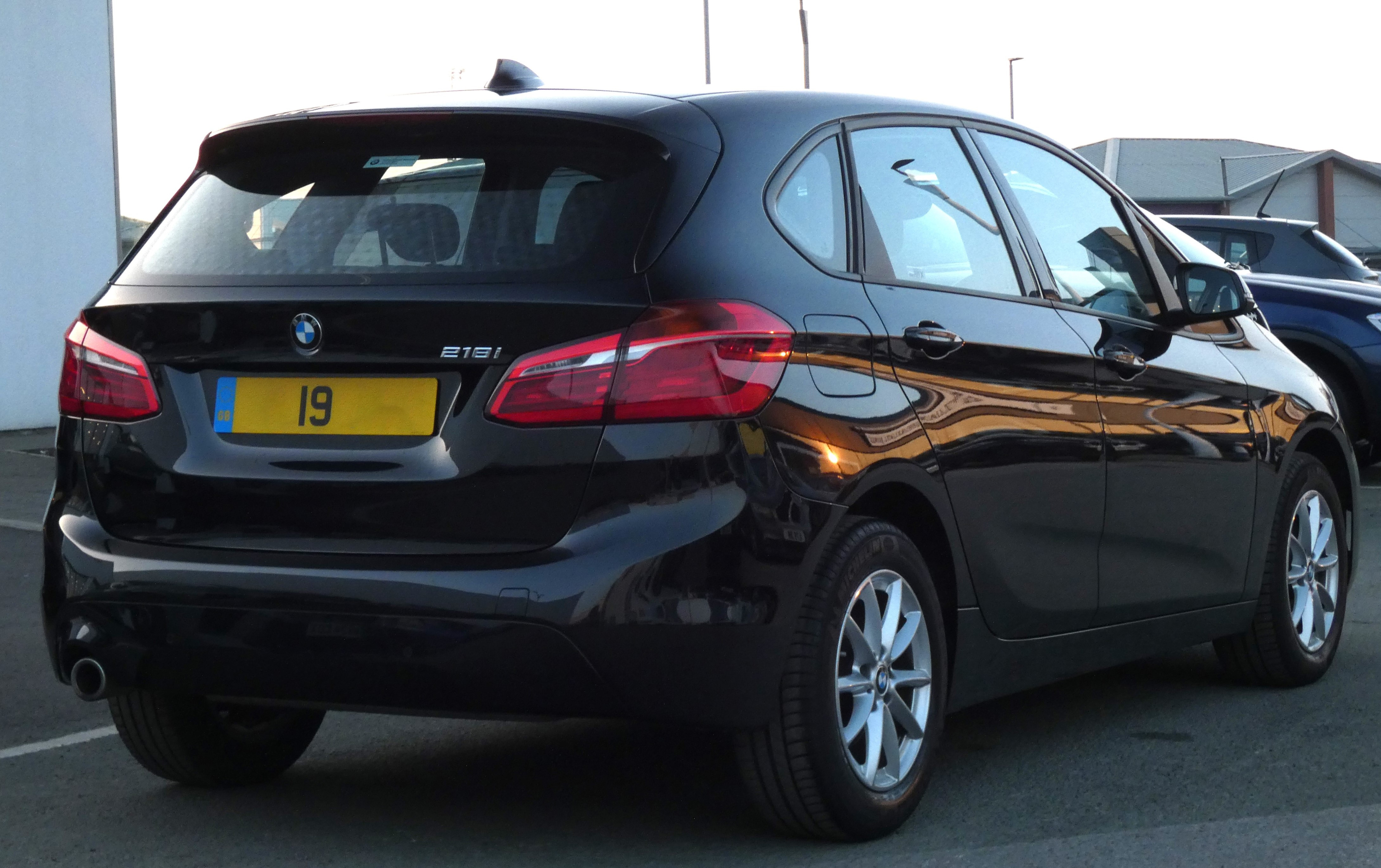
2019 BMW 218i SE Active Tourer

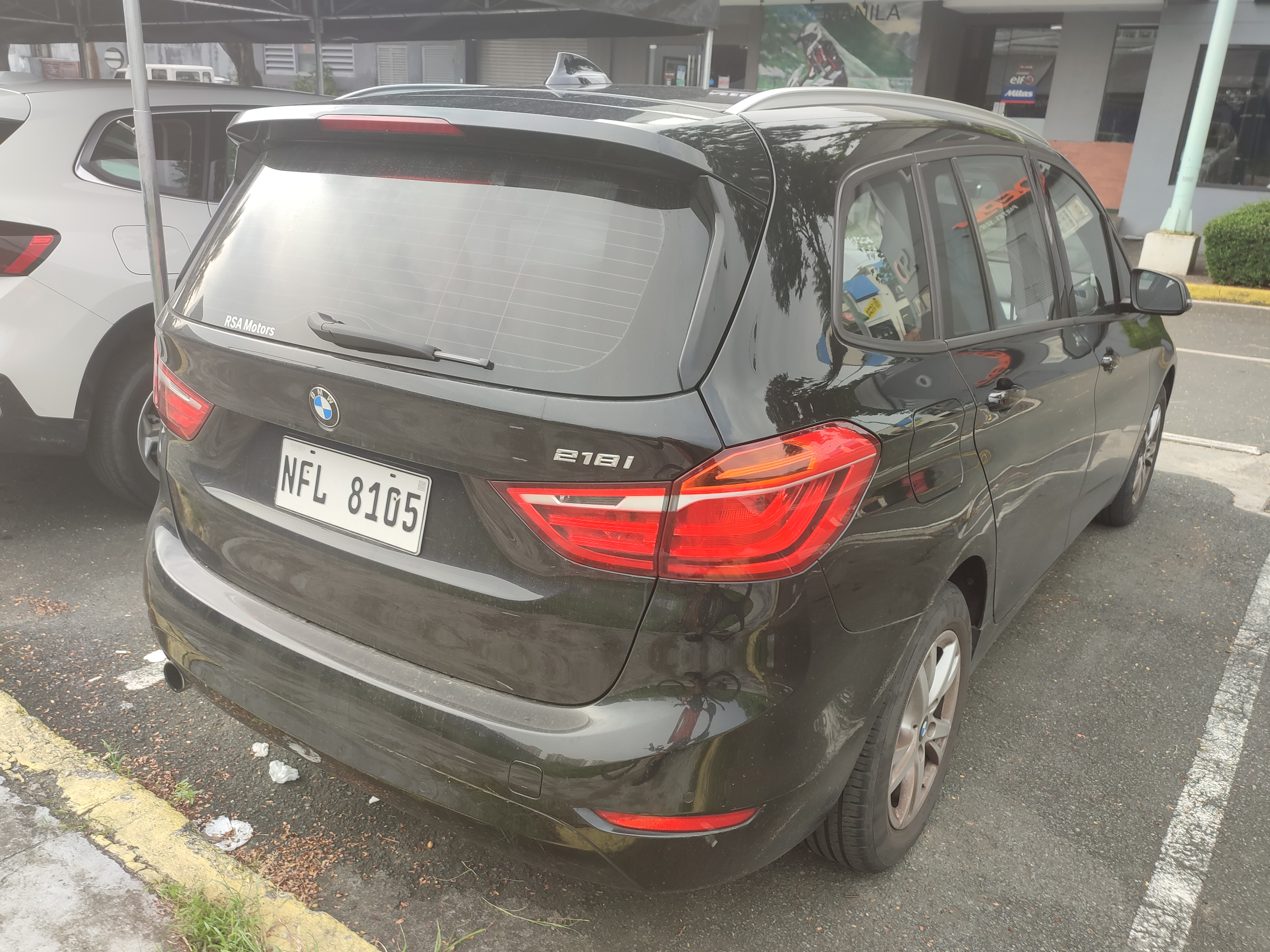
2020 BMW 218i Gran Tourer

=== Safety ===
ANCAP test results BMW 2 Series Active Tourer 3 cylinder petrol variants (2014)
Test	Score
Overall	5 /5 stars
Frontal offset	11.34/16
Side impact	16/16
Pole	2/2
Seat belt reminders	3/3
Whiplash protection	Good
Pedestrian protection	Adequate
Electronic stability control	Standard

Euro NCAP test results BMW 2 Series Active Tourer 1.5 Base (LHD) (2014)
Test	Points	%
Overall:	5 /5 stars	
Adult occupant:	31.9	84%
Child occupant:	42	85%
Pedestrian:	21.7	60%
Safety assist:	9.1	70%

== Second generation (U06; 2021) ==
Second generation
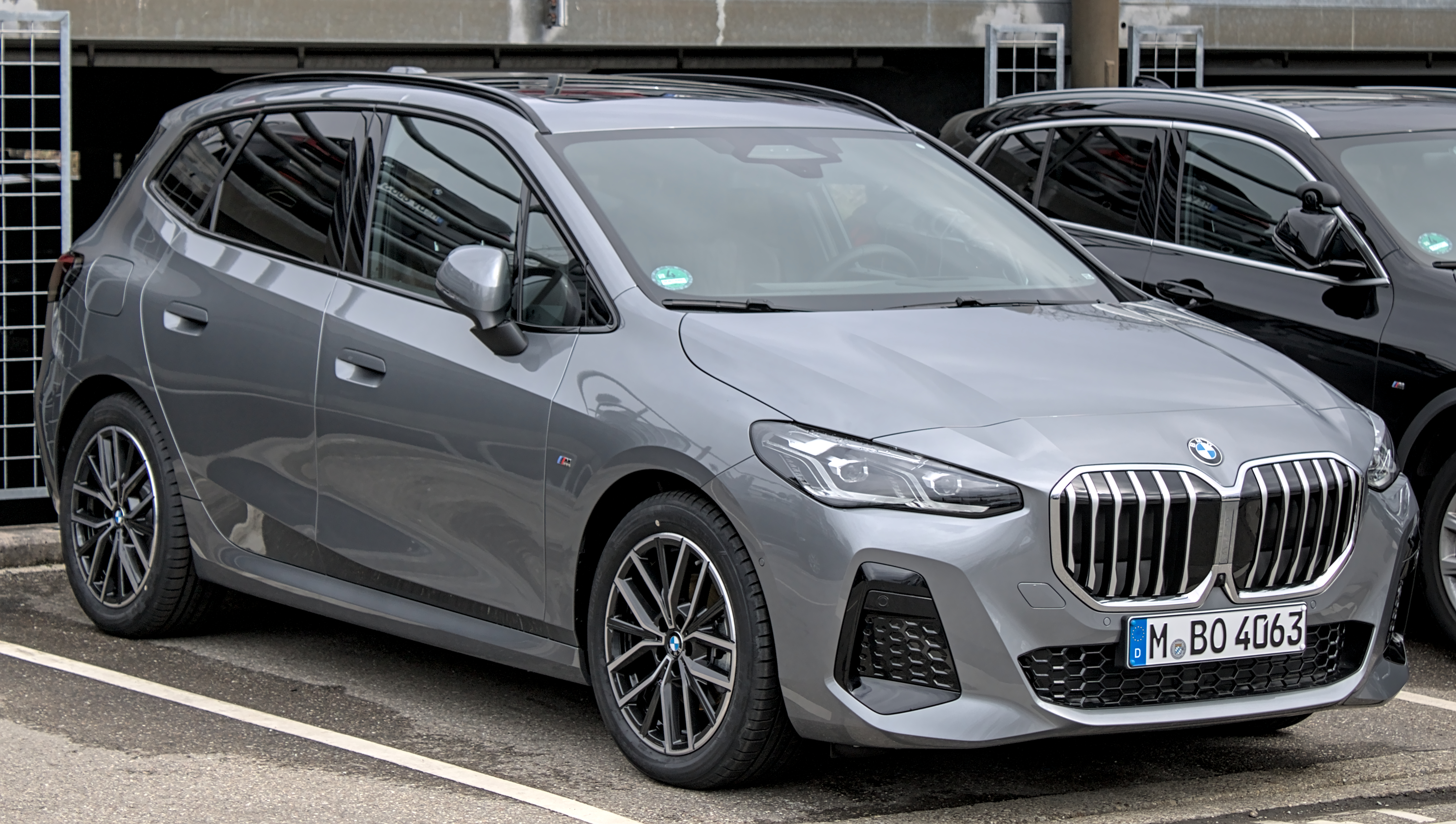

Overview
- Model code: U06
- Production: 2021–present
- Assembly: Germany: Leipzig (BMW Leipzig Plant)
- Designer: Anders Thøgersen, Panos Karras

Body and chassis
- Platform: BMW UKL2 platform
- Related: BMW X1 (U11); BMW 1 Series (F40); BMW 2 Series Gran Coupé

Powertrain
- Engine: Petrol: 1.5 L B38 I3 turbo; 2.0 L B48 I4 turbo; Petrol plug-in hybrid: 1.5 L B38A15M0 petrol I3 turbo; Diesel: 2.0 L B47 I4 turbo
- Electric motor: 14 kW (19 hp) power booster (MHEV); 80 kW (107 hp) permanent-magnet synchronous motor (225xe PHEV); 130 kW (174 hp) permanent-magnet synchronous motor (230xe PHEV)
- Transmission: 7-speed Magna 7DCT300 M-DCT dual-clutch; 7-speed Magna 7DCT400 M-DCT dual-clutch
- Hybrid drivetrain: MHEV (220i, 223i, 223d xDrive); PHEV (225e xDrive, 230e xDrive)
- Battery: 16.3 kWh lithium-ion (PHEV)

Dimensions
- Wheelbase: 2,670 mm (105.1 in)
- Length: 4,386 mm (172.7 in)
- Width: 1,824 mm (71.8 in)
- Height: 1,576 mm (62.0 in)
- Curb weight: 1,470–1,845 kg (3,241–4,068 lb)

The second-generation BMW 2 Series Active Tourer was unveiled in October 2021. Available with a choice of petrol and diesel engines, a range of PHEV powertrains was available since 2022. Furthermore, the 2nd-generation BMW 2-Series Active Tourer model will be available solely as a two-row MPV hatchback, as BMW decided not to develop a three-row BMW 2-Series Gran Tourer variant of the U06 generation 2-Series Active Tourer due to the declining popularity of compact three-row MPVs. As a result, the F46 BMW 2-Series Gran Tourer was discontinued in 2021 without any direct successor planned due to poor sales and due to the rising popularity of crossovers and SUVs, with the BMW X7 SUV becoming the only BMW with third-row seating in production and sold as a new vehicle.

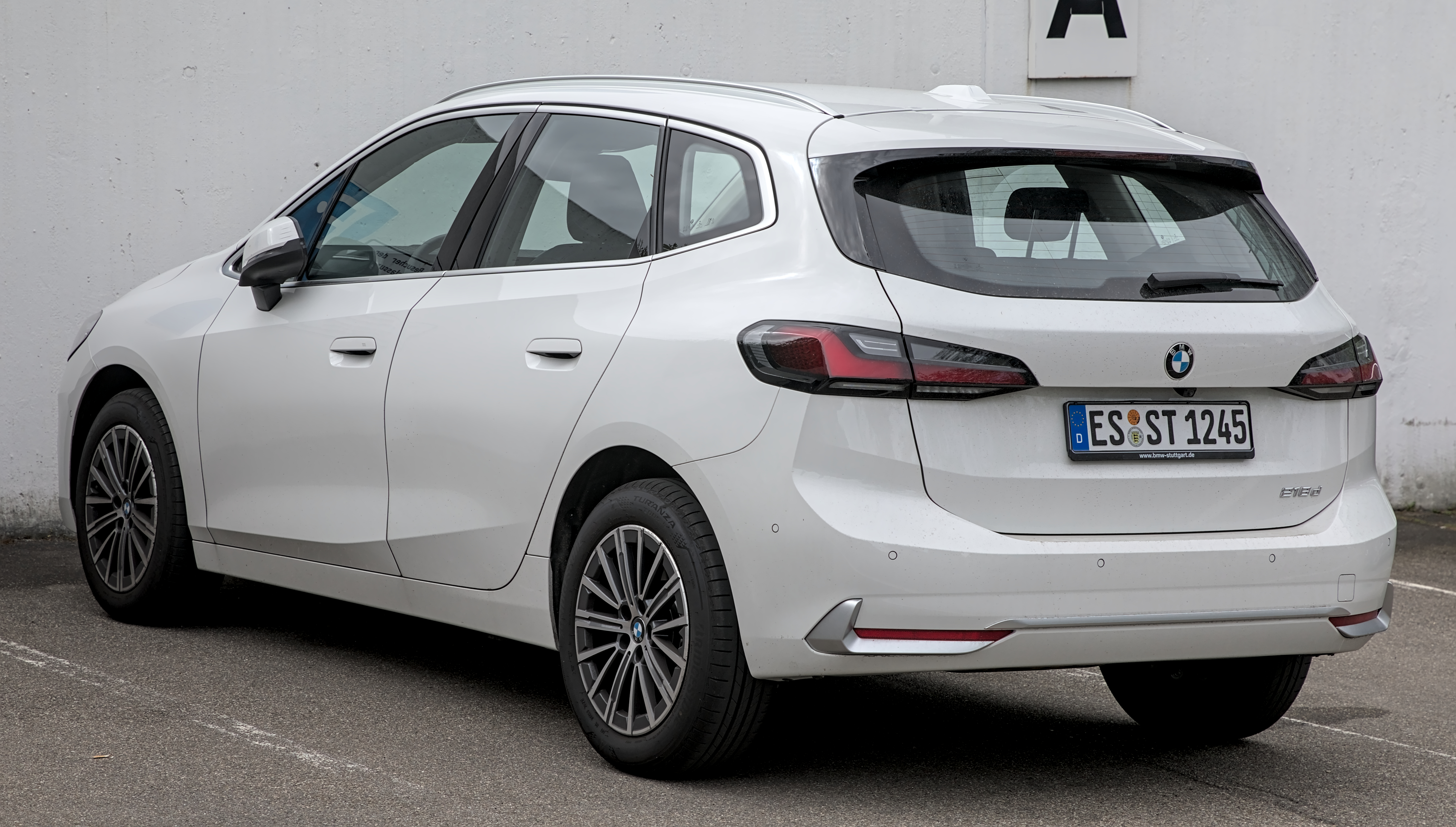
2022 BMW 218d

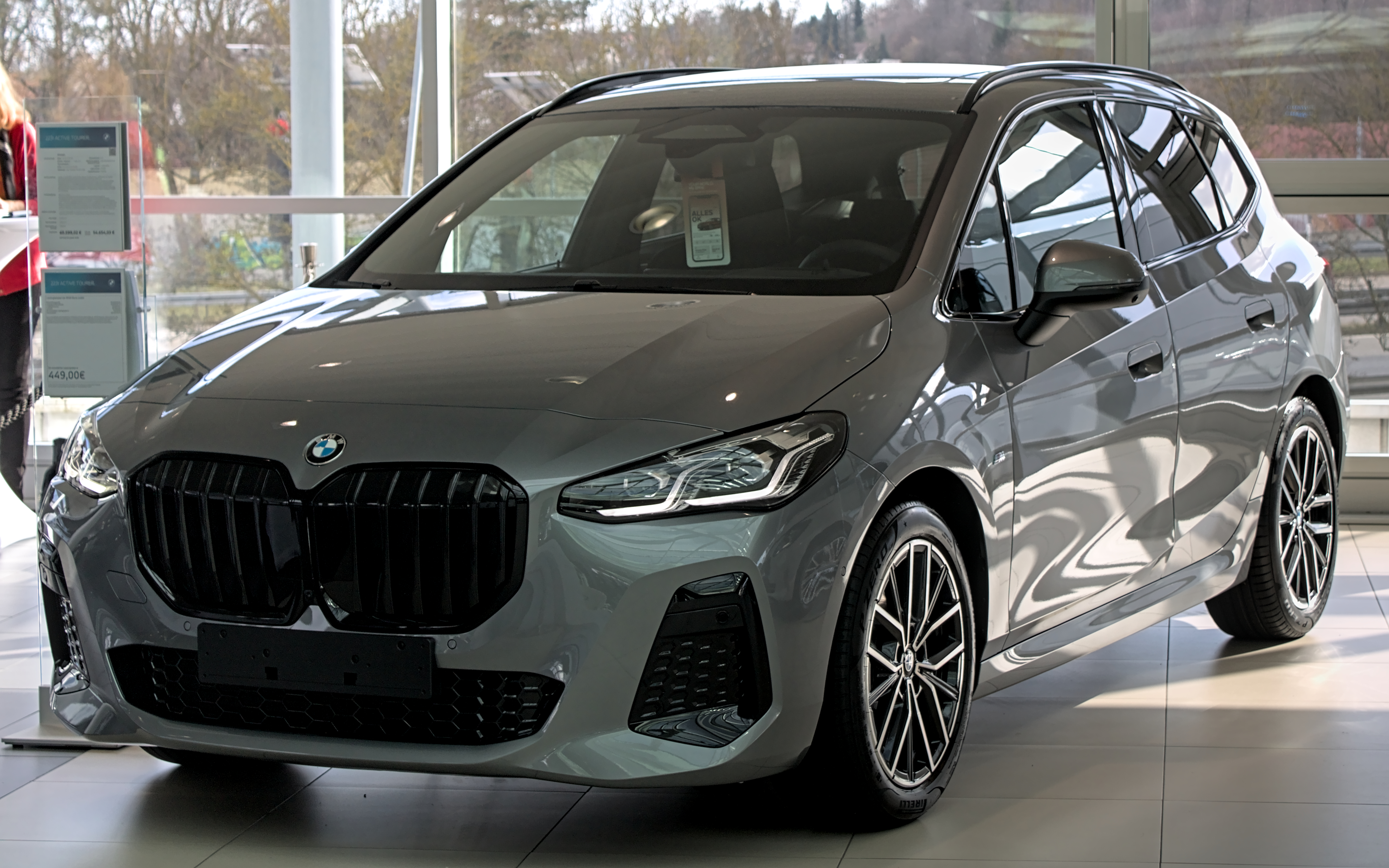
2022 BMW 220i M Sport

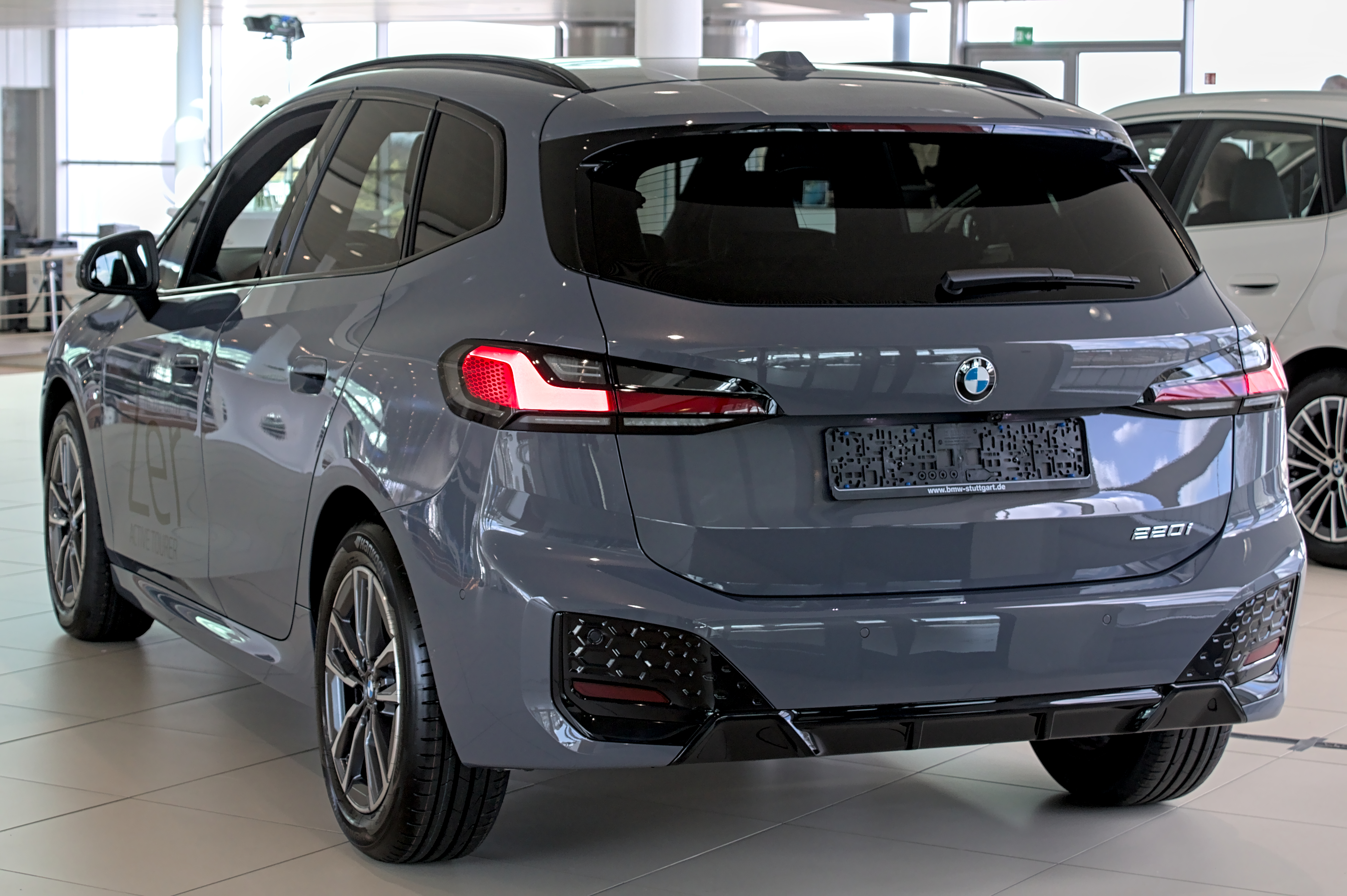
2022 BMW 220i M Sport

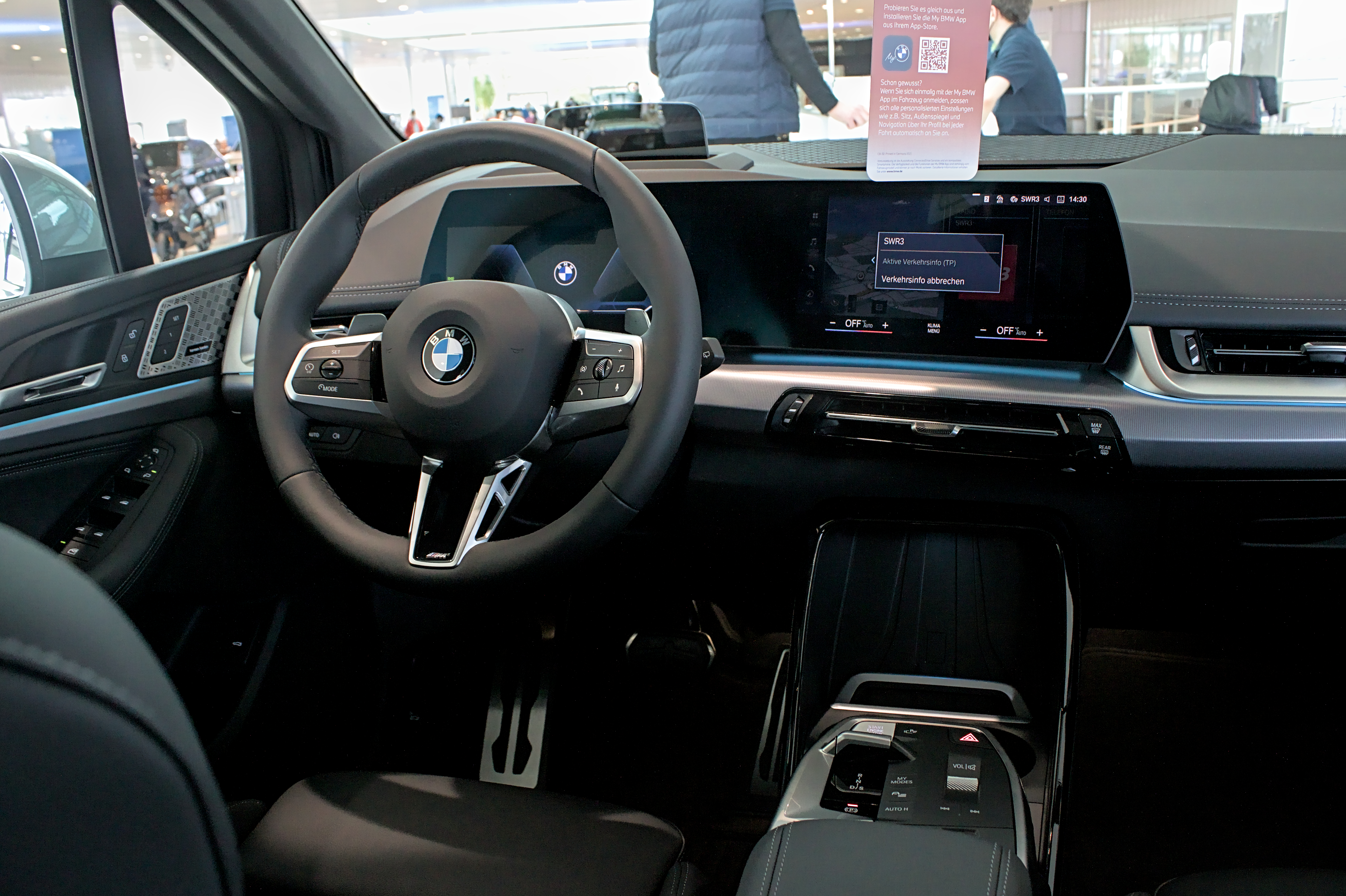
Interior

=== Engines ===
Petrol engines
Model	Years	Type/code	Power, torque at rpm
216i	2023–	1,499 cc (91.5 cu in) I3 single-scroll turbo (B38A15)	90 kW (122 PS; 121 hp) at 3,900–6,500 rpm, 230 N⋅m (170 lb⋅ft) at 1,500–3,600 rpm
218i	2021–	1,499 cc (91.5 cu in) I3 single-scroll turbo (B38A15)	100 kW (136 PS; 134 hp) at 4,400–6,500 rpm, 230 N⋅m (170 lb⋅ft) at 1,500–4,000 rpm
220i	2021–	1,499 cc (91.5 cu in) I3 single-scroll turbo (B38A15M2) + 48-volt MHEV system	125 kW (170 PS; 168 hp) at 4,700–6,500 rpm, 280 N⋅m (207 lb⋅ft) at 1,500–4,400 rpm
223i	2021–	1,998 cc (121.9 cu in) I4 twin-scroll turbo (B48A20M2) + 48-volt MHEV system	160 kW (218 PS; 215 hp) at 5,000–6,500 rpm, 360 N⋅m (266 lb⋅ft) at 1,500–4,000 rpm
223i xDrive	2022–	1,998 cc (121.9 cu in) I4 twin-scroll turbo (B48A20M2) + 48-volt MHEV system	160 kW (218 PS; 215 hp) at 5,000–6,500 rpm, 360 N⋅m (266 lb⋅ft) at 1,500–4,000 rpm
225xe	2022–	1,499 cc (91.5 cu in) I3 single-scroll turbo (B38A15 Hybrid) + electric motor	100 kW (136 PS; 134 hp) at 4,400–6,500 rpm, 230 N⋅m (170 lb⋅ft) at 1,500–4,000 rpm (Engine); 80 kW (109 PS; 107 hp), 247 N⋅m (182 lb⋅ft) (Electric Motor); 180 kW (245 PS; 241 hp) at 4,400–6,500 rpm, 477 N⋅m (352 lb⋅ft) at 1,500–4,000 rpm (Combined)
230xe	2022–	1,499 cc (91.5 cu in) I3 single-scroll turbo (B38A15 Hybrid) + electric motor	110 kW (150 PS; 148 hp) at 4,700–6,500 rpm, 230 N⋅m (170 lb⋅ft) at 1,500–4,400 rpm (Engine); 130 kW (177 PS; 174 hp), 247 N⋅m (182 lb⋅ft) (Electric Motor); 240 kW (326 PS; 322 hp) at 4,700–6,500 rpm, 477 N⋅m (352 lb⋅ft) at 1,500–4,400 rpm (Combined)

Diesel engines
Model	Years	Type/code	Power, torque at rpm
220d	2021–	1,995 cc (121.7 cu in) I4 turbo (B47C20)	110 kW (150 PS; 148 hp) at 3,750–4,000 rpm, 360 N⋅m (266 lb⋅ft) at 1,500–2,500 rpm
223d xDrive	2022–	1,995 cc (121.7 cu in) I4 turbo (B47C20) + 48-volt MHEV system	145 kW (197 PS; 194 hp) at 4,000 rpm, 400 N⋅m (295 lb⋅ft) at 1,500–2,750 rpm

=== Safety ===
Euro NCAP test results BMW 218i Active Tourer (LHD) (2022)
Test	Points	%
Overall:	5 /5 stars	
Adult occupant:	33.7	88%
Child occupant:	40	81%
Pedestrian:	42.8	79%
Safety assist:	14.8	92%

== See also ==
- List of BMW vehicles
