= GT =

GT, Gt or G-T may refer to:

== Arts and entertainment ==
=== Gaming ===
- GT Interactive, an American video game developer
- GameTrailers, a video game website
- Gran Turismo (series), a series of racing video games
- GT Legends, a computer racing game

=== Music ===
- Gran Turismo (album), a 1998 album by the Cardigans
- Gyllene Tider, a Swedish pop group
- Groove Terminator, Australian electronic music artist

=== Other media ===
- Dragon Ball GT, an anime television series
- GameTrailers TV with Geoff Keighley, a television series
- Gay Times, a UK culture magazine for gay males, known also as GT
- Gran Torino (film), a 2008 drama starring Clint Eastwood
- GT Academy, a television program
- The Grand Tour, television series shown on Amazon Prime

== Cars ==
- Grand tourer (Italian: gran turismo), usually a high-performance luxury automobile designed for long-distance driving

=== Car models ===
==== Production models ====
- Alfa Romeo GT, a 2003–2010 Italian sports car
- Bentley Continental GT, a 2003–present British sports car
- Buick Excelle GT, a 2009–2023 Chinese compact car
- Ford GT, a 2004–2006, 2016–2022 American sports car
- Maserati 3500 GT, a 1957–1964 Italian sports car
- Mercedes-AMG GT, a 2015–present German sports car
- MG GT, a 2014–present Chinese compact sedan
- Neta GT, a 2023–2024 Chinese sports car
- Opel GT, a 1968–1973 German sports car
- Opel GT (roadster), a 2007–2009 German sports car
- Porsche Carrera GT, a 2003–2007 German sports car
- Range Rover GT, an upcoming coupe SUV
- Asüna GT, a 1993 hatchback marketed in Canada as a rebadged Daewoo LeMans
- Geely Borui, a 2015–2022 Chinese mid-size sedan, sold in Russia as Geely Emgrand GT
- Maserati GranTurismo, a 2007–2019 Italian sports car, abbreviated as Maserati GT
- ATS GT, a 2019-present Italian sports car
- McLaren GT, a 2019-present British sports car
- Jensen GT, a 1975-1976 British sports shooting brake
- Hennessey Venom GT, a 2011-2017 American sports car
- Dino 206 GT and 246 GT, 1967-1974 Italian sports cars
- Audi e-tron GT, a 2020-present German electric executive car
- Lamborghini 350 GT, a 1964-1966 Italian sports car
- Zenvo TS1 GT, a 2016-present Dutch sports car
- Artega GT, a 2009-2012 German sports car
- Unipower GT, a 1966-1969 a British sports car
- Glas GT, a 1964-1968 German sports coupé
- Marcos GT, various British sports cars
- Manic GT, a 1969-1971 Canadian sports car
- Maserati 3200 GT, a 1998-2002 Italian coupé
- Maserati 5000 GT, a 1959-1966 Italian coupé
- Apollo GT, a 1962-1964 Italian-American sports car
- Hyptec GT, a 2023-present Chinese electric car
- ATS 2500 GT, a 1963-1965 Italian sports car
- Toyota 2000GT, a 1967-1970 Japanese sports car

==== Concepts and prototypes ====
- ArcFox GT, a 2019 Chinese electric sports car prototype
- BYD E-SEED GT, a 2019 Chinese sports car concept
- Chevrolet Corvair Monza GT, a 1962 American sports car prototype
- Geely GT, a 2008 Chinese sports car concept
- Citroën GT, a 2008 French sports coupé concept
- Kia GT, a 2011 South Korean mid-size sedan concept
- Lightning GT, a 2008 British electric sports car prototype
- Mitsubishi GT-PHEV, a 2016 Japanese mid-size SUV concept
- Opel GT, a 2016 German sports car concept
- Bentley EXP 100 GT, a 2019 British sports car concept

==== Trim levels and variants ====
- BMW GT, an abbreviation short for BMW's Gran Turismo fastback variants
- Chevrolet Vega GT, a sports package for the 1970–1977 Chevrolet Vega American subcompact car
- Dodge Challenger GT, an all-wheel drive variant of the 2017-2023 Dodge Challenger American sports car
- Ford Mustang GT, a trim level for the 1964–present Ford Mustang American sports car
- Karma Revero GT, the updated version of the 2017–present Karma Revero American hybrid electric sports sedan
- Kia Stinger GT, a trim level for the 2018–2023 Kia Stinger South Korean sports sedan
- Lancia Aurelia GT, a coupe variant of the 1950–1958 Lancia Aurelia Italian full-size car
- Lancia Flaminia GT, a coupe variant of the 1957–1964 Lancia Flaminia Italian full-size car
- Škoda Kamiq GT, a sport package for the 2018–2026 Škoda Kamiq Chinese subcompact SUV
- Škoda Kodiaq GT, a fastback variant of the 2016–2026 Škoda Kodiaq Czech mid-size SUV
- WEY VV7 GT, a fastback variant of the 2017–2021 WEY VV7 Chinese mid-size SUV
  - WEY P8 GT, the PHEV variant of the VV7 GT

=== Motorsport ===
- Blancpain GT Series, an auto racing series
- FIA GT Championship, an international sports car racing series
- Grand Touring, used by the IMSA GT Championship
- McLaren Solus GT, a 2023 track only sports car

== Companies ==
- GT Bicycles, a large American manufacturer of road, mountain, and BMX bicycles
- Goodyear Tire and Rubber Company, a multinational tire manufacturer (NASDAQ ticker GT)
- Göteborgs-Tidningen, a Swedish newspaper
- Grant Thornton LLP, a public accounting firm
- Greenberg Traurig, an international law firm
- Goodson-Todman Productions, later Mark Goodson Productions, now part of FremantleMedia, American game show production company

== Places ==
- Georgetown, Guyana, the capital of Guyana
- Guatemala, ISO 3166-2 country code

=== Schools ===
- Georgia Tech (formal name: Georgia Institute of Technology), an American university
- St Joseph's College, Gregory Terrace, a Catholic boys' school in Australia
- Gordon Technical High School, now DePaul College Prep, a Catholic high school in Chicago, Illinois
- Graettinger–Terril Community School District

== Science and technology ==
=== Biology and medicine ===
- Gain of thyroid, or Thyroid's secretory capacity, a calculated parameter for diagnosis of thyroid disorders
- Glanzmann's thrombasthenia, a rare medical condition
- Giant trevally, a species of fish from the family Carangidae
- Glutamyl transpeptidase, a marker of liver disease

=== Computing and telecommunications ===
- .gt, the Internet country code top-level domain for Guatemala
- Antenna gain-to-noise-temperature, (G/T), a figure of merit for satellite antennas
- Gigabyte Technology, a computer hardware manufacturer
- Gigatransfer, a number of data transfers (or operations)
- Global Title, an address used for routing signaling messages on telecommunications networks
- Google Talk, Google's instant-messaging client
- Google Translate, Google's translation service
- Graph theory, the branch of discrete mathematics dealing with the data structure
- "Greater than", a relational operator used in computer languages

=== Other uses in science and technology ===
- Gas turbine, a rotary engine that extracts energy from a flow of combustion gas
- Geometry & Topology, a mathematical journal
- Gigatesla, an SI unit of magnetic flux density
- Gigatonne (Gt), a metric unit of mass
- Gross tonnage, a unitless measure of the size of merchant ships
- Grounded theory, a method for generating theories, especially in the social sciences
- Group technology, a method for organization of a manufacturing system

== Transportation ==
- Grand Trunk Railway (1852–1923), a former railroad in Canada and northeast US
- Grand Trunk Road, a highway connecting Bangladesh, India, Pakistan and Afghanistan

== Sports ==
- Gujarat Titans, a cricket team in the Indian Premier League

== Other uses ==
- Gifted and talented education, a broad term used in the education of certain children
- Gin and tonic, a drink
- GT-MU, a Russian military vehicle
- 2007 Greensburg tornado, a large and devastating EF5 tornado in 2007, referred to as "GT" in numerous studies

== See also ==
- Grand Tour (disambiguation)
- Gran Turismo (disambiguation)
