= 2000GT (disambiguation) =

2000GT or 2000 GT can refer to:

- Alfa Romeo 2000 GT Veloce, a 1970s sports car
- Abarth Simca 2000 GT, the GT model of Abarth Simca 2000
- Maserati Merak 2000 GT, a 1970s sports car
- Nissan Skyline 2000GT, a model in the Nissan Skyline car range
- Nissan Skyline 2000GT, a model in the Nissan Skyline GT-R car range
- Toyota 2000GT, a 1960s sports car/grand tourer
- Toyota Carina 2000GT, a model in the Toyota Carina car range
- Toyota Celica 2000GT, a model in the Toyota Celica car range
- Toyota Chaser 2000GT, a model in the Toyota Chaser car range
- Toyota Corona 2000GT, a model in the Toyota Corona car range
- Toyota Supra 2000GT, a model in the Toyota Supra car range

== See also ==
- GT (disambiguation)
