= Gran Turismo =

Gran Turismo may refer to:

== Cars ==
- Grand tourer, a type of car for long distance
- Gran Turismo, or grand touring racing, long distance endurance racing (motorsport)
- Gran Turismo, or GT racing, circuit competition for Gran Turismo sports cars
- Maserati GranTurismo, a two-door 2+2 coupé produced by Maserati
- Studebaker Gran Turismo Hawk
- BMW Gran Turismo

== Video games ==
- Gran Turismo (series), a racing simulation video game series
  - Gran Turismo (1997 video game), the first game in the main series
  - Gran Turismo (2009 video game), PlayStation Portable spin-off in the series

== Film ==
- Gran Turismo (film), a 2023 biographical film about a professional driver who trained on the racing simulation video game series

== Music ==
- Gran Turismo (album), by The Cardigans
- "Moon over the Castle", a song by Masahiro Andoh

== See also ==
- Grand Tour, an educational trip around the cultural highlights of Europe
- Grand Tour (disambiguation)
- Gran Torino, a 2008 film directed by and starring Clint Eastwood
- Gran Torino, a version of the Ford Torino
- GT (disambiguation)
- Turismo (disambiguation)
- Gran (disambiguation)
