= Turismo =

Turismo in Italian, Spanish, Portuguese, means tourism.

Turismo may also refer to:

- Turismo or touring car racing
- Gran Turismo - endurance or long distance races
- Gran Turismo (automobile), a type of car, a turismo or tourer
- the Gran Turismo series on Sony PlayStation game consoles.
- Turismo (Grand Theft Auto), the name of a car in the GTA videogame series
  - Turismo, the name of a car in Grand Theft Auto: San Andreas, which resembles Ferrari F40
  - Turismo, the name of a car in Grand Theft Auto IV, it was based on a Ferrari 360 Modena
- Plymouth Turismo, a 1980s rebranded version of the Dodge Charger

== See also ==
- Compagnia Italiana Turismo, an Italian tourism company
- Gran Turismo (disambiguation)
