= Grand Tour (disambiguation) =

The Grand Tour is a tour of European cultural centres that once was a standard feature of the education of the European elite, in the 17th to early 19th centuries.

Grand Tour may also refer to:

== Entertainment ==
=== Music ===
- Grand Tour (Big Big Train album), 2019 progressive rock album
- The Grand Tour (album), 1974 album by George Jones
- The Grand Tour, a 1993 album by Aaron Neville
- "The Grand Tour" (song), title track from Jones' 1974 album
- The Grand Tour (musical), a 1979 Broadway musical
- Grand Tour, a 1959 musical with music by David Shire
- Grand Tour: The Classic, a 2013 Asian live concert tour of South Korean boyband Shinhwa
- Grand Tour: The Return, a 2012 Asian live concert tour of South Korean boyband Shinhwa

=== Other entertainment ===
- Grand Tour (novel series) (1985–2017), series of science fiction novels by Ben Bova
- Grand Tour: Disaster in Time, a 1992 science fiction film (a.k.a. Timescape)
- The Grand Tour, a British motoring television series
- The Grand Tour (2026), a reboot of the above series with new presenters
- The Grand Tour Game, a 2019 video game
- Grand Tour (film), a 2024 historical drama directed by Miguel Gomes
- Grand Tours or planetary tours in fiction, a science fiction motif
- The Grand Tour: The European Adventure of a Continental Drifter, US title of Tim Moore's book Continental Drifter

== Other uses ==
- Grand Tour (cycling), collective term given to three European cycling stage races
- Grand Tour (data visualisation), a technique used to explore multivariate statistical data
- Grand Tour program, NASA mission that visited the outer planets
- Corris Railway Grand Tour, tourist service in Wales between 1886 and 1930, connecting the Corris and Talyllyn Railways

== See also ==
- Grand tourer, a type of car
- GT (disambiguation)
- Gran Turismo (disambiguation)
