= BMW Central Building =

Building in Leipzig, Germany

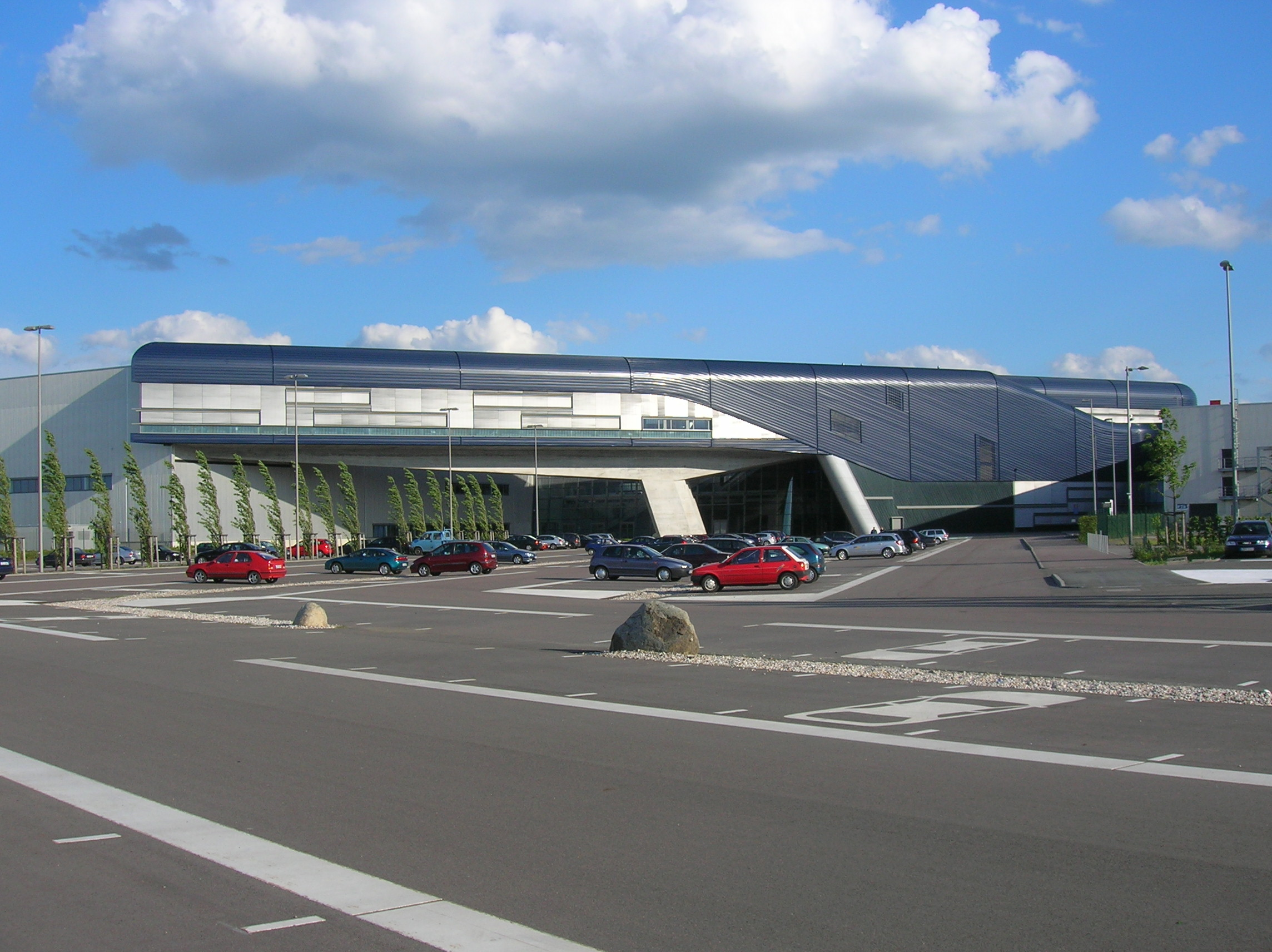
- Interactive map of BMW Central Building
- Location: Leipzig, Germany
- Coordinates: 51.4081°N 12.4435°E
- Owner: BMW AG. Munich Germany

Construction
- Groundbreaking: March 2003
- Opened: May 2005
- Cost: $60 Million
- Architect: Zaha Hadid Architects
- Structural engineers: AGP Arge Gesamtplanung, IFB Stuttgart
- Main contractors: Arge Rohbau, OBAG / Wolf&Mueller GmbH

The BMW Central Building Located in Leipzig, Germany, was the winning design submitted for competition by Pritzker Prize winning architect, Zaha Hadid. The central building is the nerve center for BMW's new $1.55 billion complex built to manufacture the BMW 3 Series.

== Concept ==
The BMW factory prior to the construction of the central building existed as three disconnected buildings, each playing an integral part in the production of BMW 3 Series vehicles. These three production buildings were designed in-house by BMW's real estate and facility management group, housing separately the fabrication of raw auto bodies (645,000 square feet (59,900 m^{2})), the paint shop (270,000 square feet (25,000 m^{2})), and the final assembly hall (1,075,000 square feet (99,900 m^{2})). A competition was held for the design of a central building to function as the physical connection of the three units. It also needed to house the administrative and employee needs spaces. Hadid's design took this idea of connectivity and used it to inform every aspect of the new building. It serves as a connection for the assembly process steps and the employees. Designed as a series of overlapping and interconnecting levels and spaces, it blurs the separation between parts of the complex and creates a level ground for both blue and white collar employees, visitors, and the cars.

== The building ==
From a pool of 25 international architects, the BMW jury chose the design of Zaha Hadid as the final piece of the BMW plant in Leipzig, Germany. With no real precedent for her design, Zaha Hadid's Central Building can only be related to industrial designs of the past including Fiat Lingotto Factory by G. Matté-Trucco and the AEG Turbine Factory in Berlin by Peter Behrens. The BMW Central building is a 270,000-square-foot (25,000 m^{2}) facility that makes up only 250,000 square feet (23,000 m^{2}) of the 540-acre (2.2 km^{2}) campus. Serving 5,500 employees, the building functions as the most important piece of the factory, connecting the three production sheds. Each day, 650 BMW 3 Series sedans pass through the Central Building on an elevated conveyor as they move from one of the three production sheds to the next. Dim blue LED lights highlight the vehicles after each stage, as they exit one of the sheds. These conveyors not only take the vehicles from one production shed to another, but do so directly through all of the functional spaces of the Central Building. The offices, meeting rooms, and public relations facilities are all built around these elevated conveyors, creating an interesting relationship between the employees, the cars, and the public. Not only is the Central Building an office building and public relations center for the factory, it is also a very important piece of the production process at the factory. All of the load-bearing walls, floors, and office levels are made of cast-in-place concrete, while the roof structure is composed of structural steel beams and space frame construction. The facade is clad in simple materials of like corrugated metal, channel glass, and glass curtain walls.

The buildings has received numerous architectural awards, including a 2006 RIBA European Award, and was placed on the shortlist for the Stirling Prize.

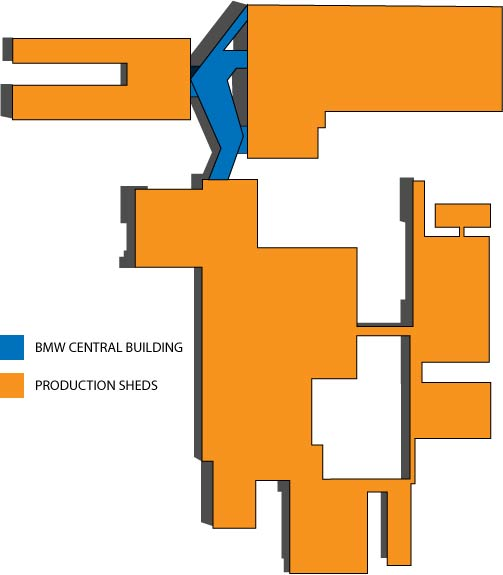
Diagrammatic Plan Of BMW Central Building Productions Sheds

== Quick facts ==
- Building Name: BMW Central Building
- Location: Leipzig, Germany
- Client: BMW AG, Munich, Germany
- Architect: Zaha Hadid
- Building Footprint: 250,000 square feet (23,000 m^{2})
- Total Area: 270,000 square feet (25,000 m^{2})
- Building Cost: $60 million
- Groundbreaking: March 2003
- Completion: May 2005
- Employees in Factory: 5,500
- Program: Control Functions, Offices/Admin., Meeting rooms, Cafeteria, Public Relations
- Parking: 4,100 Spaces
- Total Complex Cost: $1.55 Billion

== Timeline ==
- November 2001: Competition Phase #1
- November 2002: Competition Phase #2
- March 2002: Jury Decision
- August 2002: Design Development Completed
- 2002/2003: Construction Documents Completed/Bidding and Negotiations
- March 2003: Groundbreaking/Construction Commenced
- January 2004: Steel Construction Completed
- March 2004: Building Enclosed
- June 2004: Car Park Completed
- September 2004: Central Building Completed
- May 2005: Landscaping Completed/Central Building Opened
