= Bentley EXP 100 GT =

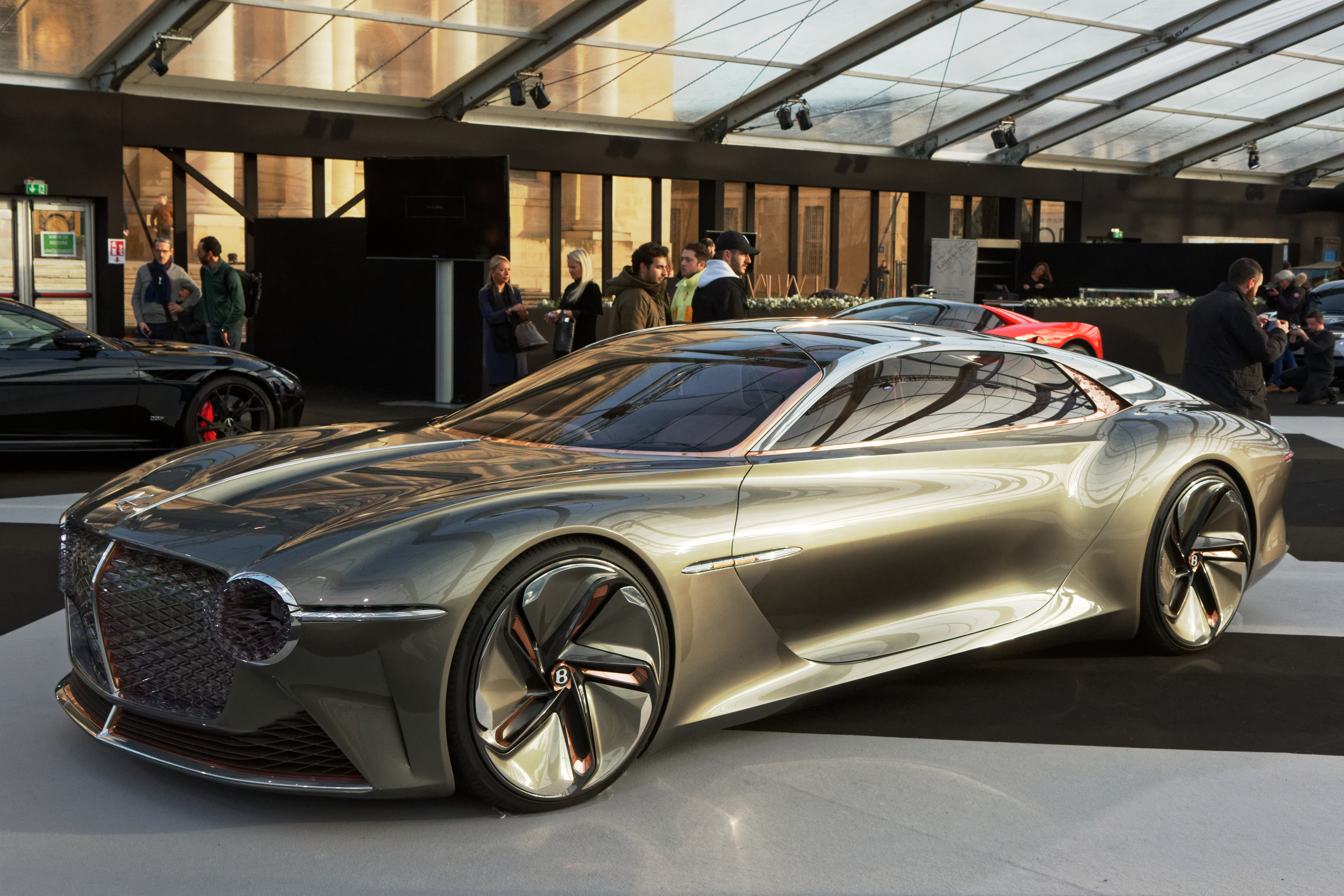

Overview
- Manufacturer: Bentley
- Production: 2019 (concept car)
- Designer: JP Gregory, Bora Kim

Body and chassis
- Class: Concept Coupé GT Sports car
- Body style: 2-doors 2/3-seater Coupé
- Layout: Four-wheel drive
- Doors: Scissor

Powertrain
- Electric motor: 4x wheel hub electric motors
- Power output: 1,400 brake horsepower (1,000 kW); 1,106 pound force-feet (1,500 N⋅m) (Projected)
- Battery: Lithium ion and solid state
- Range: 700 km (435 miles)

Dimensions
- Length: 5,800 mm (228.3 in)
- Width: 2,400 mm (94.5 in)
- Curb weight: 1,900 kg (4,189 lb)

The Bentley EXP 100 GT is a concept car introduced by Bentley for its 100th anniversary, on 10 July 2019. It is Bentley's vision of a GT car for 2035. The car is a fully electric 2-door coupe, can hit 60 mph in 2.5 seconds and has a top speed of 186 mph. The car's doors open vertically and are two-meter wide and the car is 5.8 meter long.

== Gallery ==
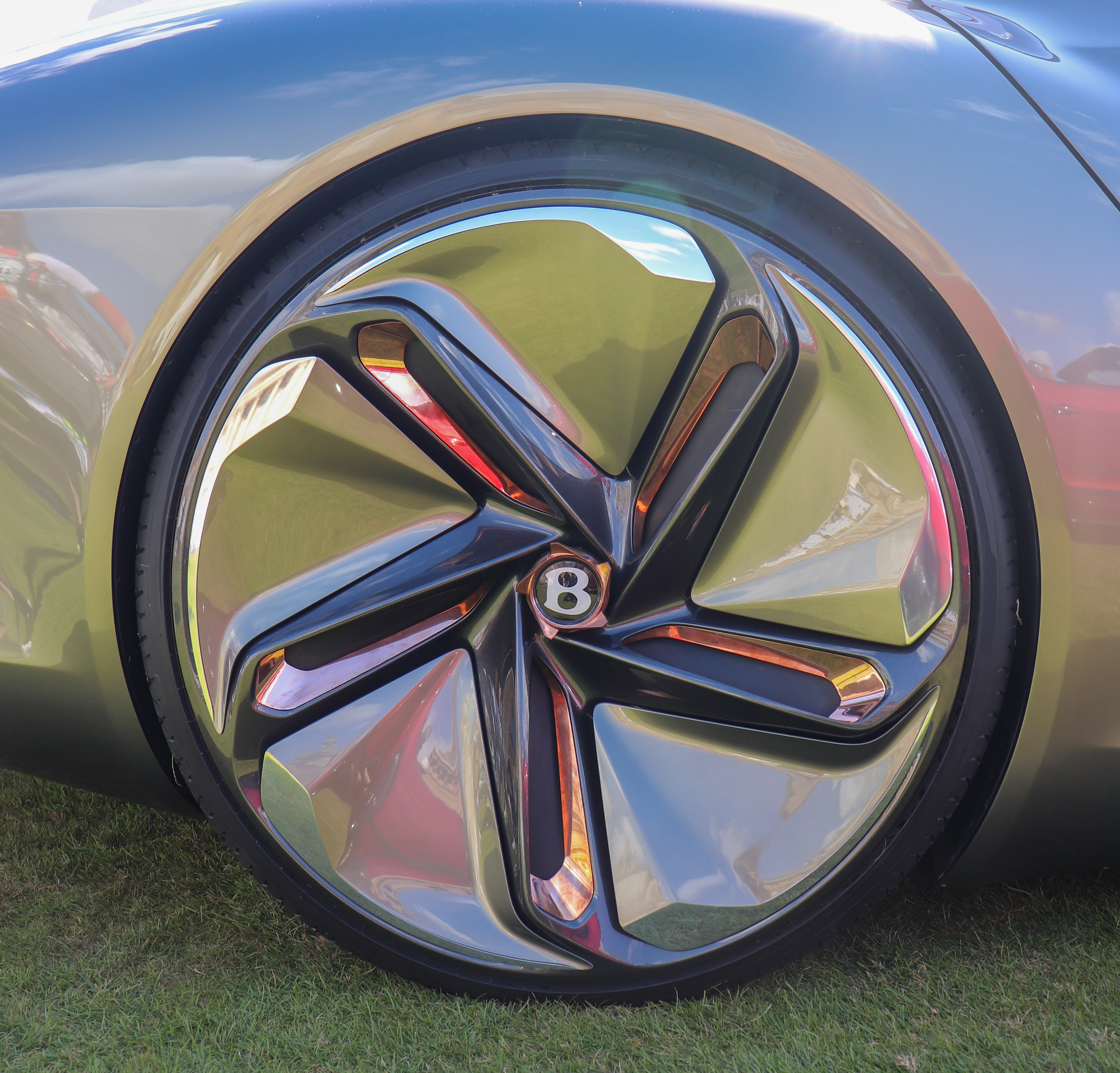

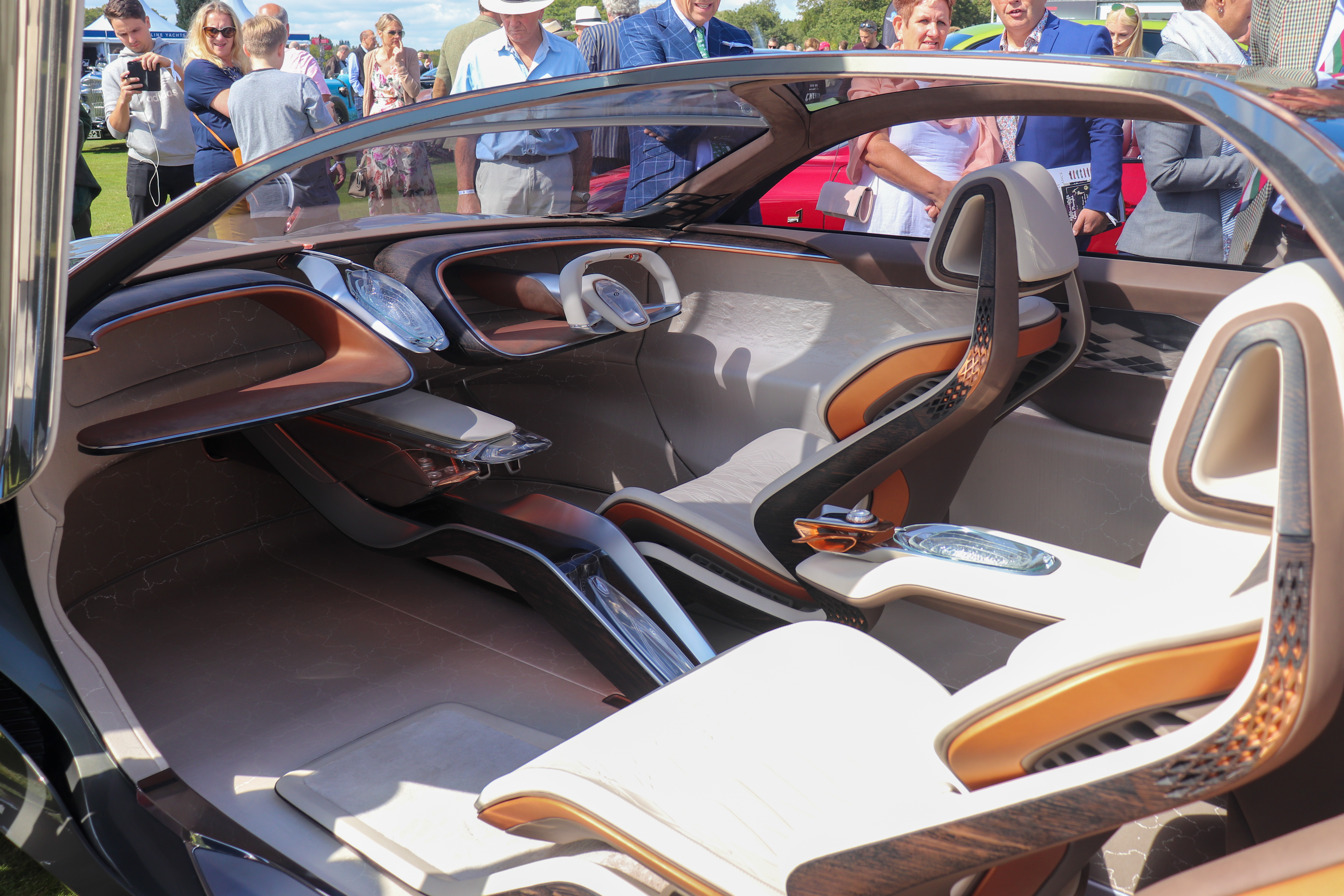

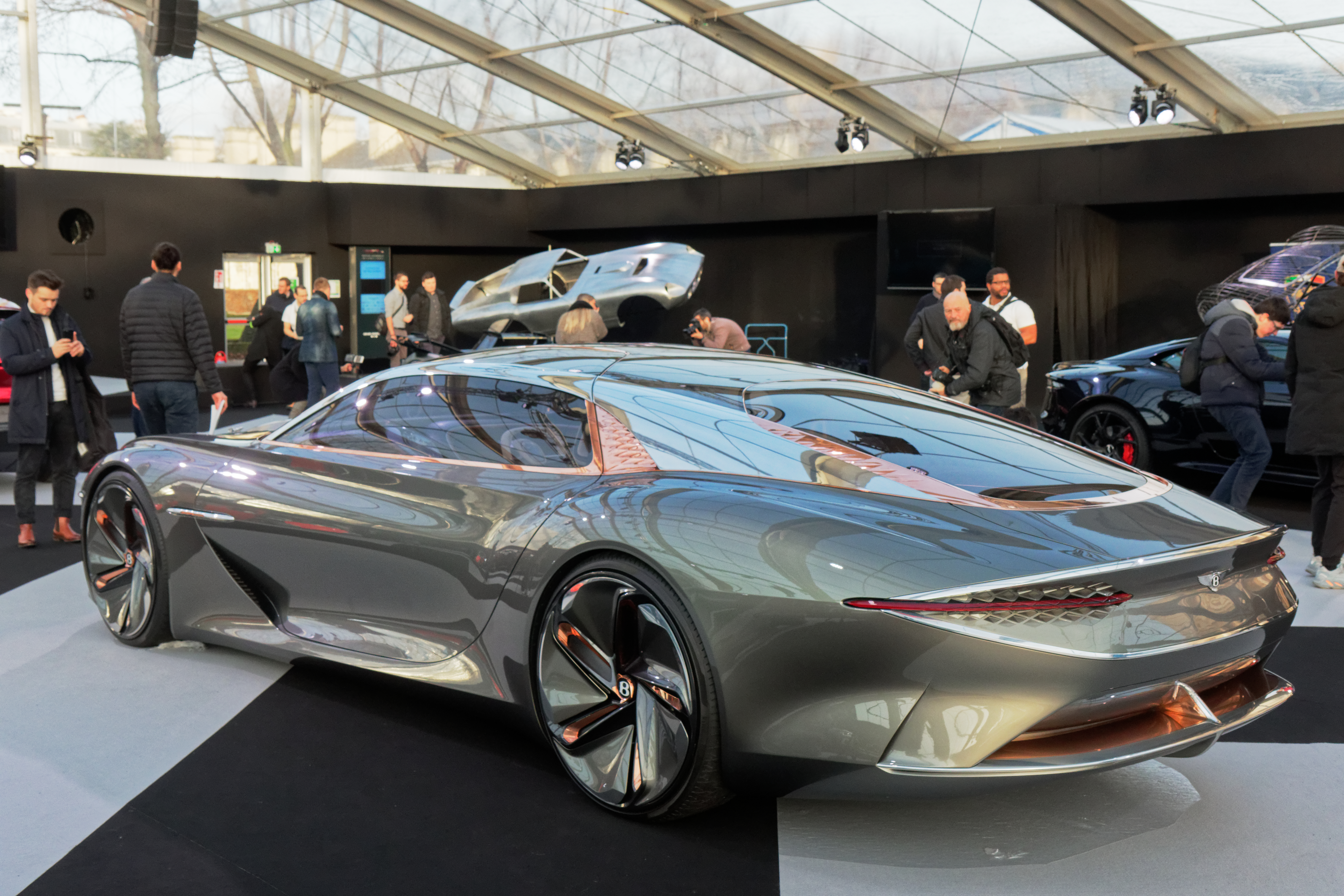

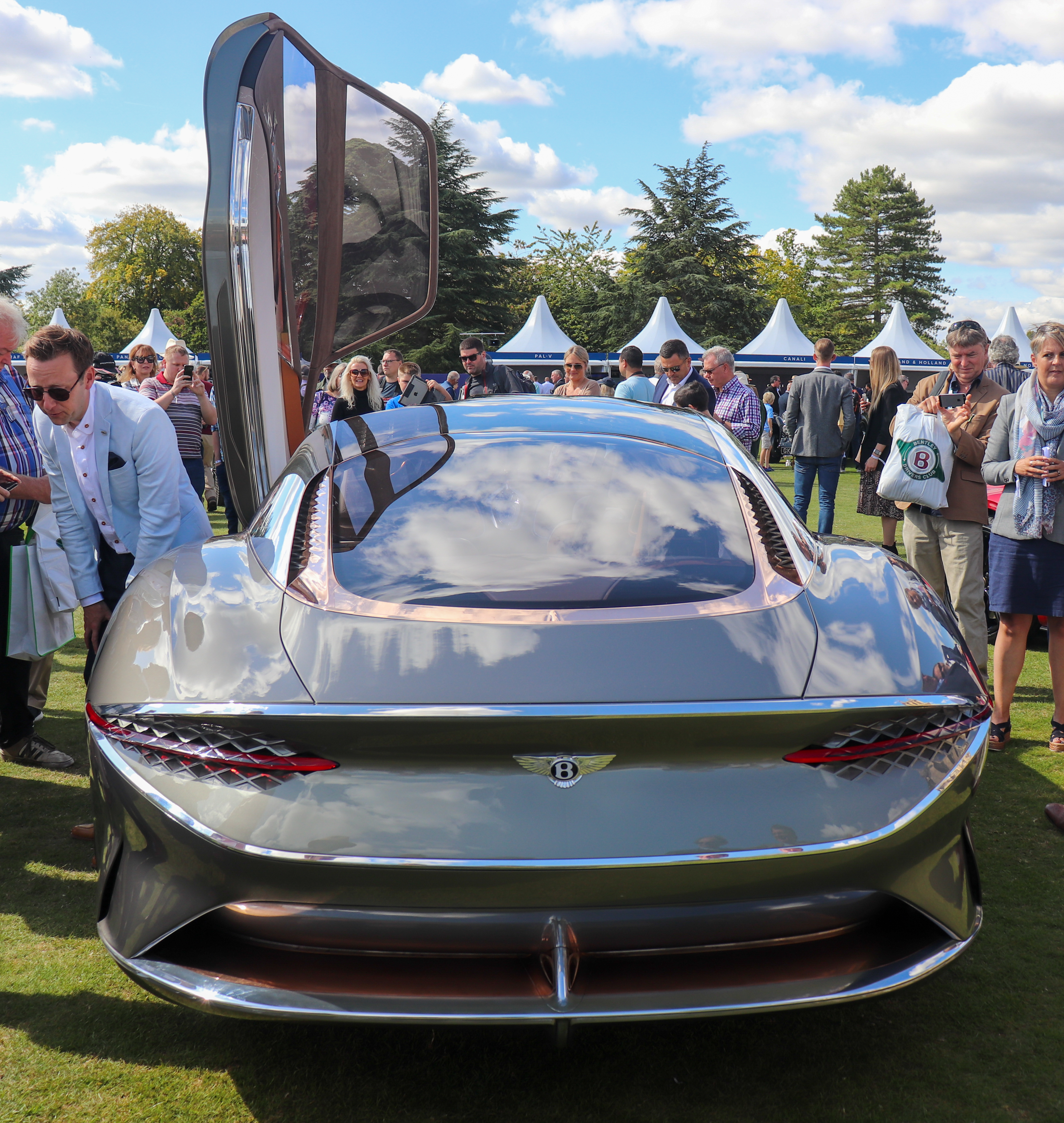
