= BMW GT =

BMW GT, an abbreviation short for BMW's Gran Turismo model ranges, may refer to:

- BMW 3 Series Gran Turismo
- BMW 5 Series Gran Turismo
- BMW 6 Series Gran Turismo

== Gallery ==
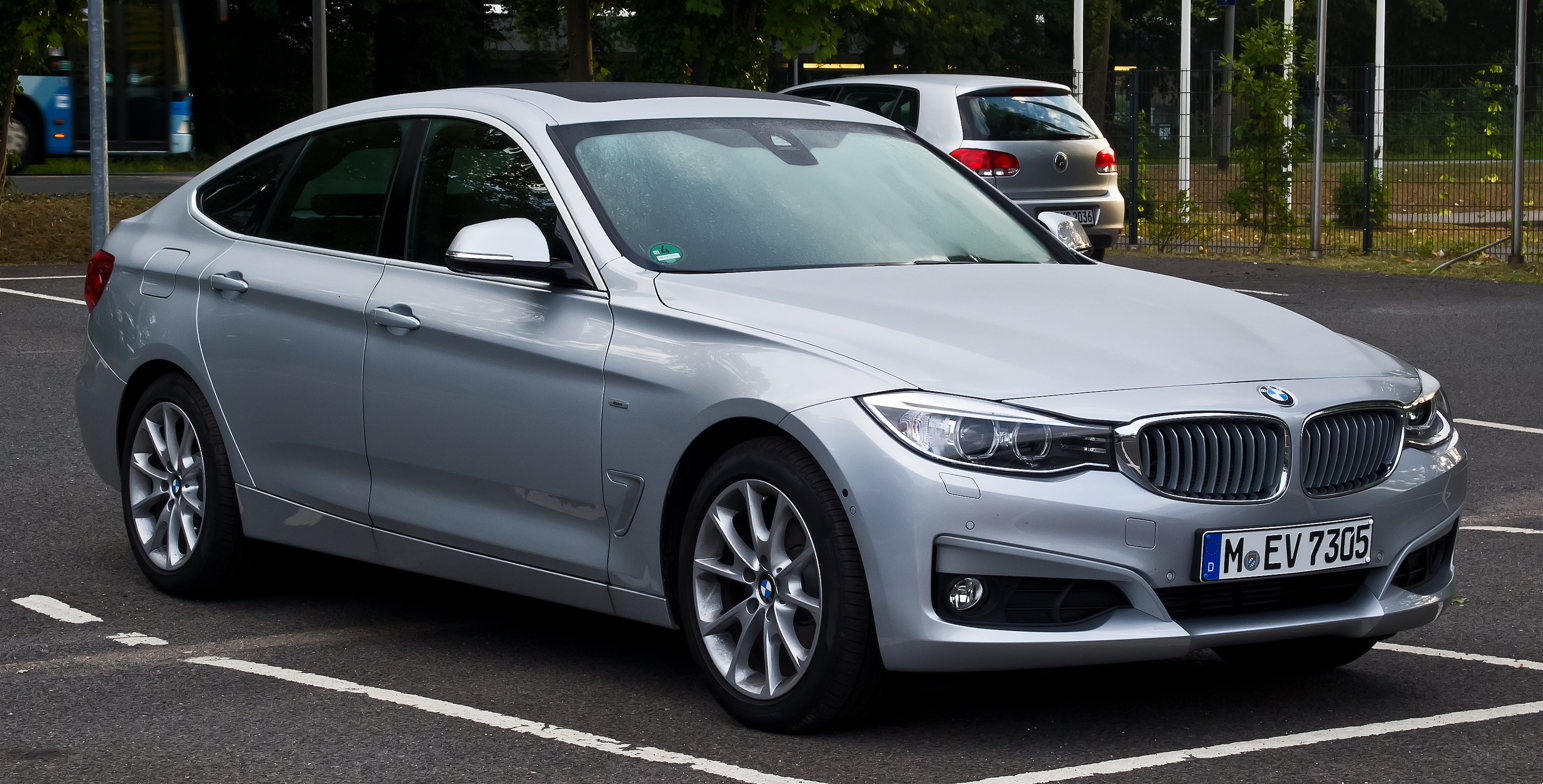
BMW 3 Series GT (2013–2019)

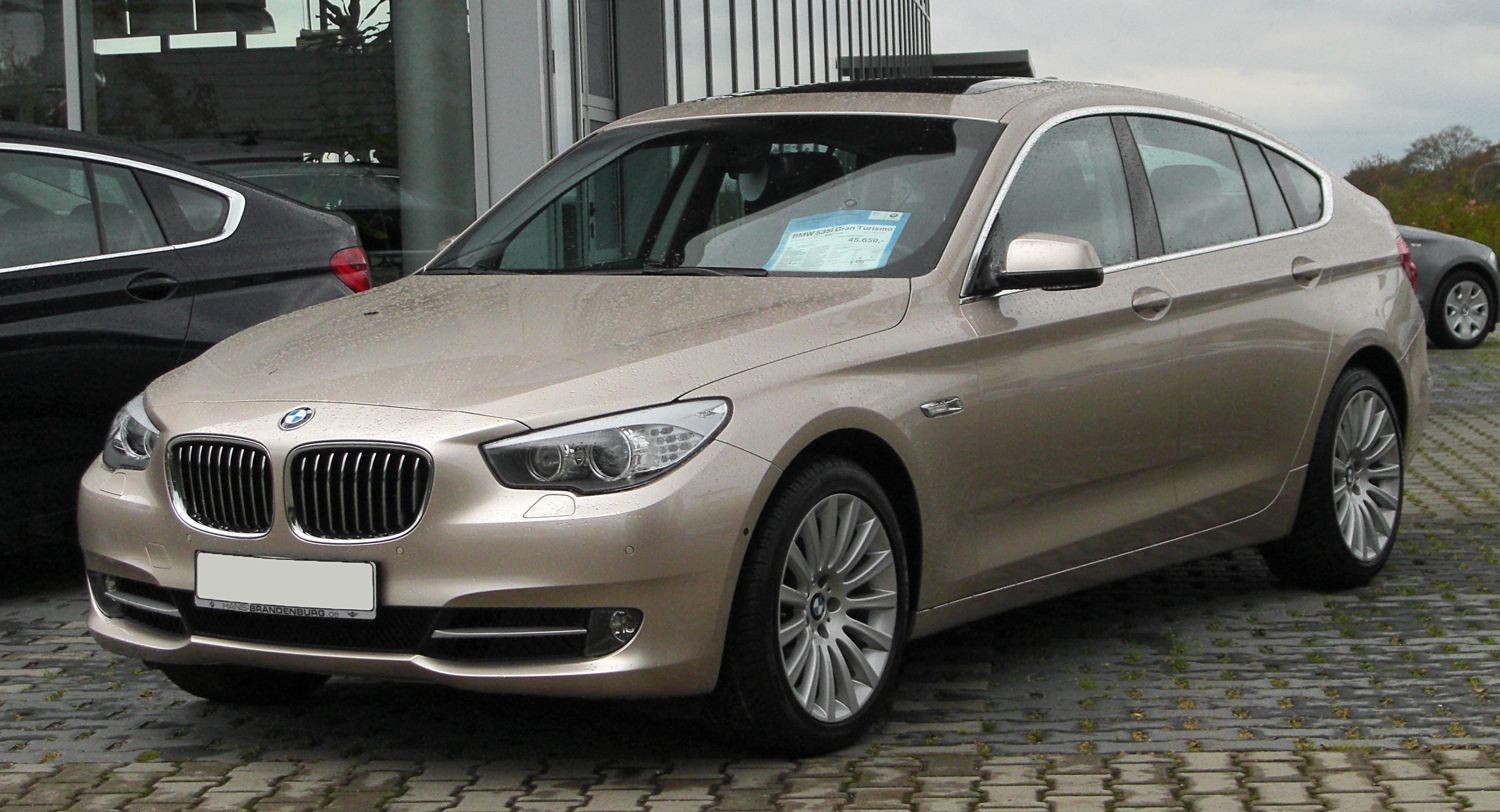
BMW 5 Series GT (2009–2017)

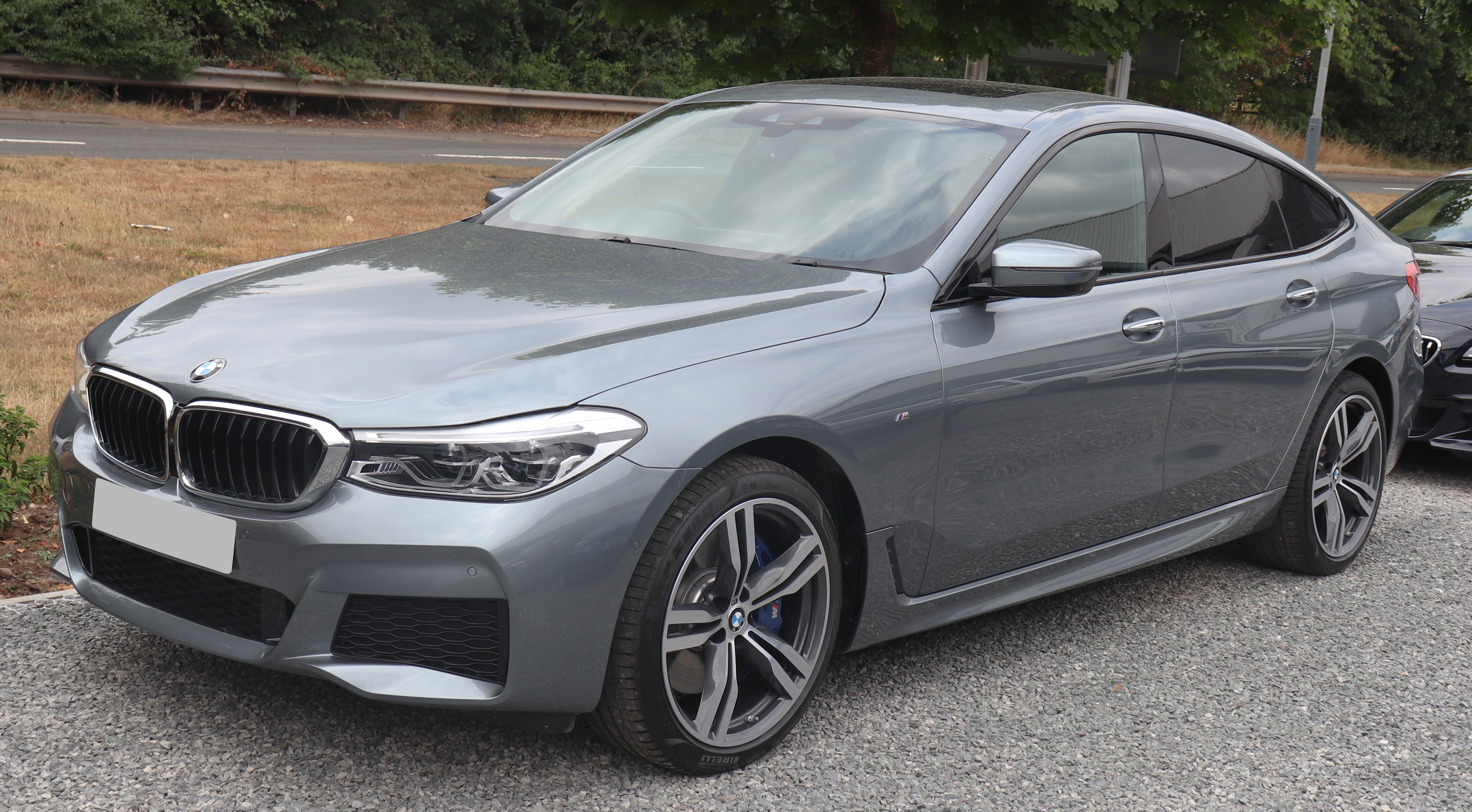
BMW 6 Series GT (2017–2023)
