= HP2 =

HP2 or variant, may refer to:

- HP2, a postcode for Hemel Hempstead, see HP postcode area
- hP2, a Pearson symbol
- Harry Potter and the Chamber of Secrets, the second Harry Potter novel
- Harry Potter and the Chamber of Secrets (film), the second Harry Potter film
- Handley Page Type B a.k.a. H.P.2, an airplane
- HP-2, a glider designed by Richard Schreder
- HP2, a type of photographic stock, see Ilford HP
- Haemophilus phage HP2, a virus
- BMW HP2 Enduro, a motorcycle
- BMW HP2 Sport, a motorcycle
- Hp.2 (proceed at reduced speed), from German railway signalling
- Hawaii: Part II, an album by Miracle Musical

== See also ==
- HP (disambiguation)
