= BMW GS series =

Series of BMW motorcycles

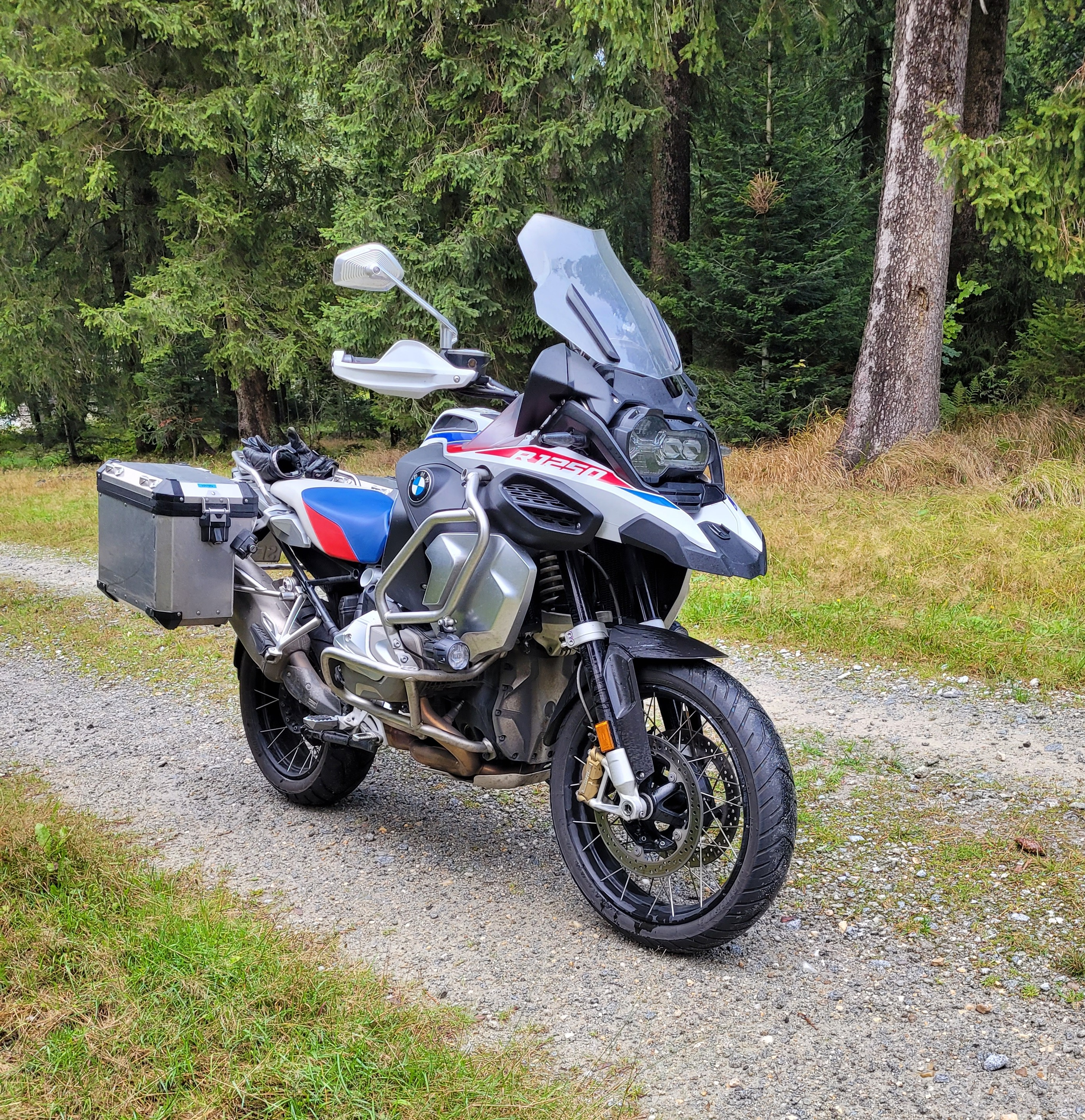
BMW R1250GS Adventure on a forest road

The BMW GS is a model series of adventure-touring motorcycles produced by BMW Motorrad since 1980 until present day. The GS acronym has had several different meanings over the years. Originally designer Hans Muth had intended to call it the "Gentleman's scrambler" but it was later launched under the name G/S meaning "Gelände/Straße" (Lit.: terrain/street). Later models removed the forward slash and now GS is generally accepted to be german for "Geländesport" (Lit.: terrainsport).

The GS models of motorcycles can be distinguished from other BMW models by their longer travel suspension, an upright riding position, and larger front wheels – typically 19 or 21 inch.

The BMW GS is generally accepted to be the first "adventure bike" combining some off-road capability of a dual-sport motorcycle, with the comfort and luggage carrying ability of a touring motorcycle.

The BMW GS is also a commercial and historically significant model for BMW Motorrad. Before its launch in 1980 the motorcycle division of BMW was struggling financially and in early 1979 the new director of BMW Motorrad Karl-Heinz Gerlinger was tasked with either making the motorcycle business profitable or shutting it down entirely. Initially some reviewers of the new R80G/S model were unimpressed with the compromised dual nature of the motorcycle, with the magazine Motorcyclist calling it "barely capable of holding its own [and] heavy and awkward". On the contrary the German publication Motorrad claimed the R80G/S was "the best roadbike BMW has made yet". By the end of 1981 BMW had sold 6,631 R80G/Ss which was more than twice the number originally hoped for, contributing to saving the motorcycle division.

The GS models have gone on to become the best selling model in BMW Motorrads lineup. On 21 June 2023 BMW announced they had produced their one millionth boxer-engined GS motorcycle.

== Model history ==
The GS has been produced in several distinct models and generations of differing engine configurations. By enthusiast these are typically distinguished and nicknamed based on the engine powering them.

=== First Generation Boxer: 1980 - 1996 "Airhead" ===
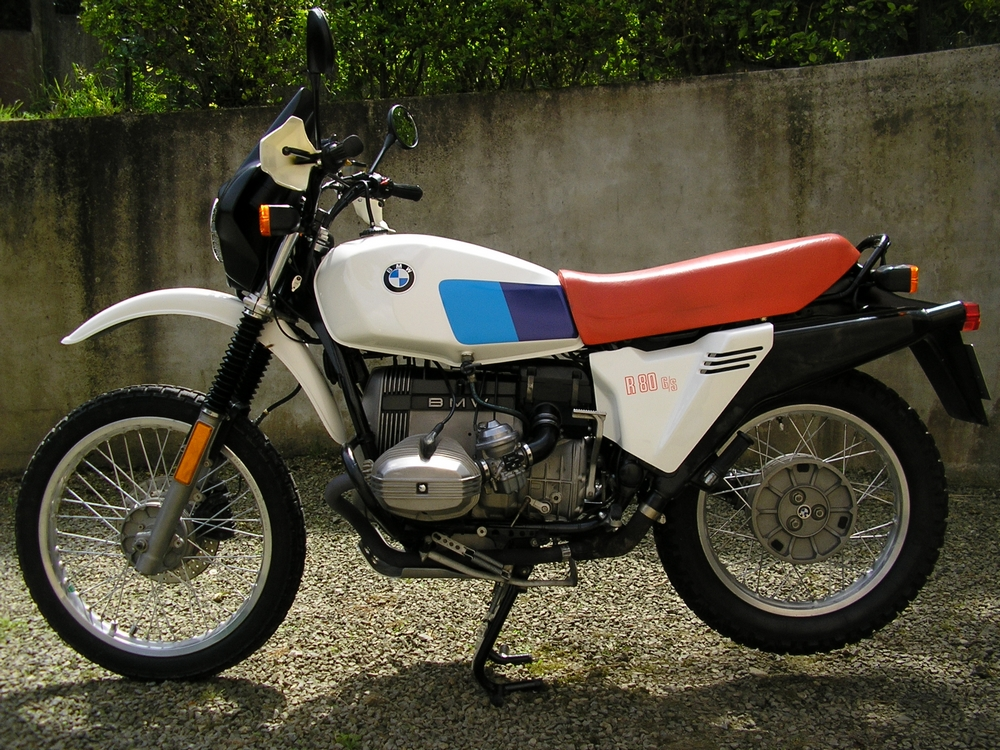
BMW R80G/S

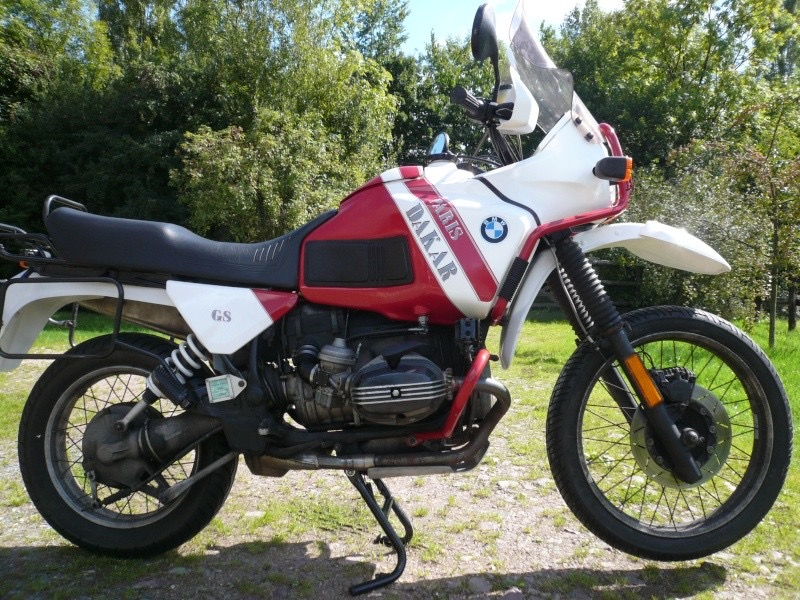
BMW R100GS Paris-Dakar

The first BMW GS model was the R80G/S powered by a 797.5 cm³ air-cooled, 2 cylinder boxer engine. It was powered by the BMW 247 engine which was also fitted to many other bikes in the BMW range of the time. This engine is known as the "airhead" because it relies on airflow across both the cylinders and cylinder heads to provide the majority of its cooling. These early models used a combined rear suspension, drive shaft and swingarm called a "Monolever".

The most collectible model of this generation is probably the R80G/S "Paris-Dakar" model featuring a larger fuel tank, a single seat and a luggage rack. This model was launched in celebration of the R80G/S wins in the Paris Dakar Rally.

In certain markets a smaller 649.6 cm³ R65GS version was also available. With a lower power output of 20 kW (27 hp), this was targeted at riders with restricted licenses and was also sold to some nations' military forces.

In 1987 the G/S name was changed to GS (see above) and the Monolever was replaced with the "Paralever" swingarm. This system included a torque arm intended to lessen shaft effect and strengthen the swingarm to final-drive connection. A host of other updates included a bigger subframe, a new front fork and tubeless rims. The new bikes were produced with engines of 797.5 cm³ (R80GS) and 980 cm³ (R100GS).

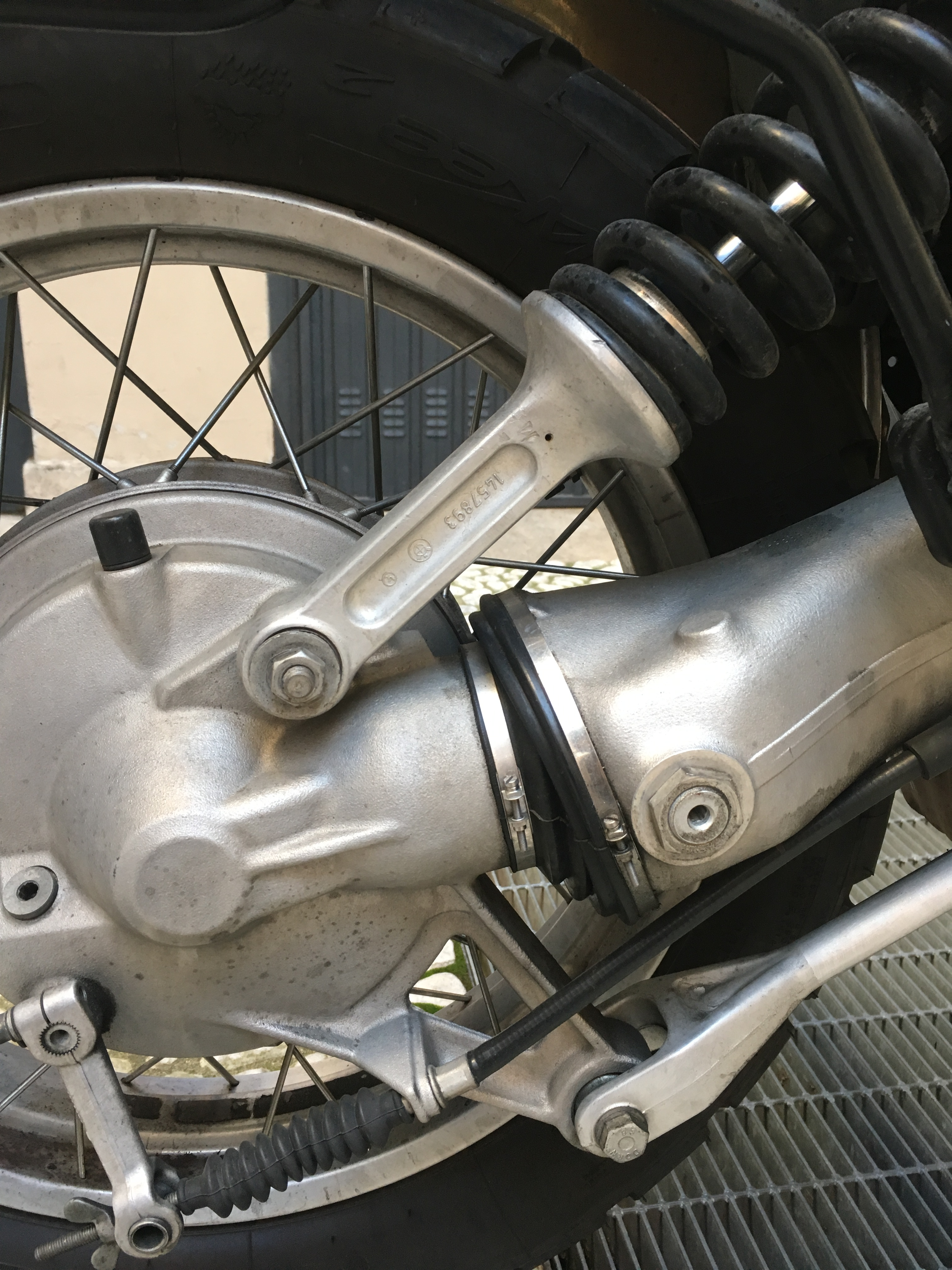
BMW "Paralever" swingarm and final-drive.

Production of the standard machines stopped in 1995 with the R100GS Paris-Dakar, but special "Kalahari" and "Basic" editions were produced until December 1996, which ended airhead GS production.

==== Airhead production history ====
Airhead GS models are listed below together with production figures where known:

Model	Years	Production count
R80G/S	1980–1986	21,864
R80G/S Paris Dakar	1984–1987	
R65GS	1987–1991	1,727
R80GS	1987–1994	11,375
R100GS	1987–1994	34,007
R100GS Paris-Dakar	1988–1996	
R80GS Basic	1996	3,003
R80GS Kalahari	1996	

=== Second Generation Boxer: 1993 - 2005 "Oilhead" ===
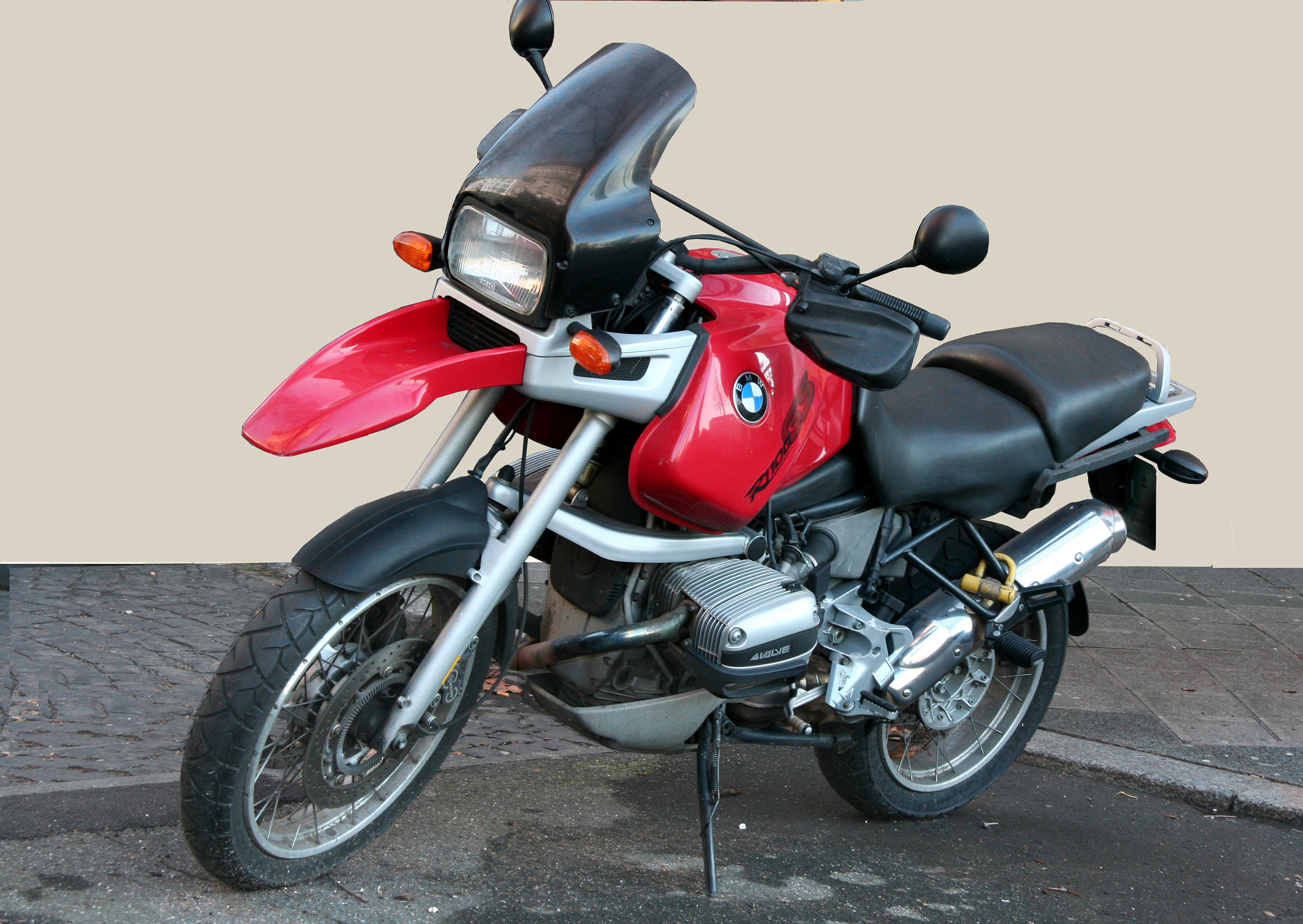
BMW R1100GS

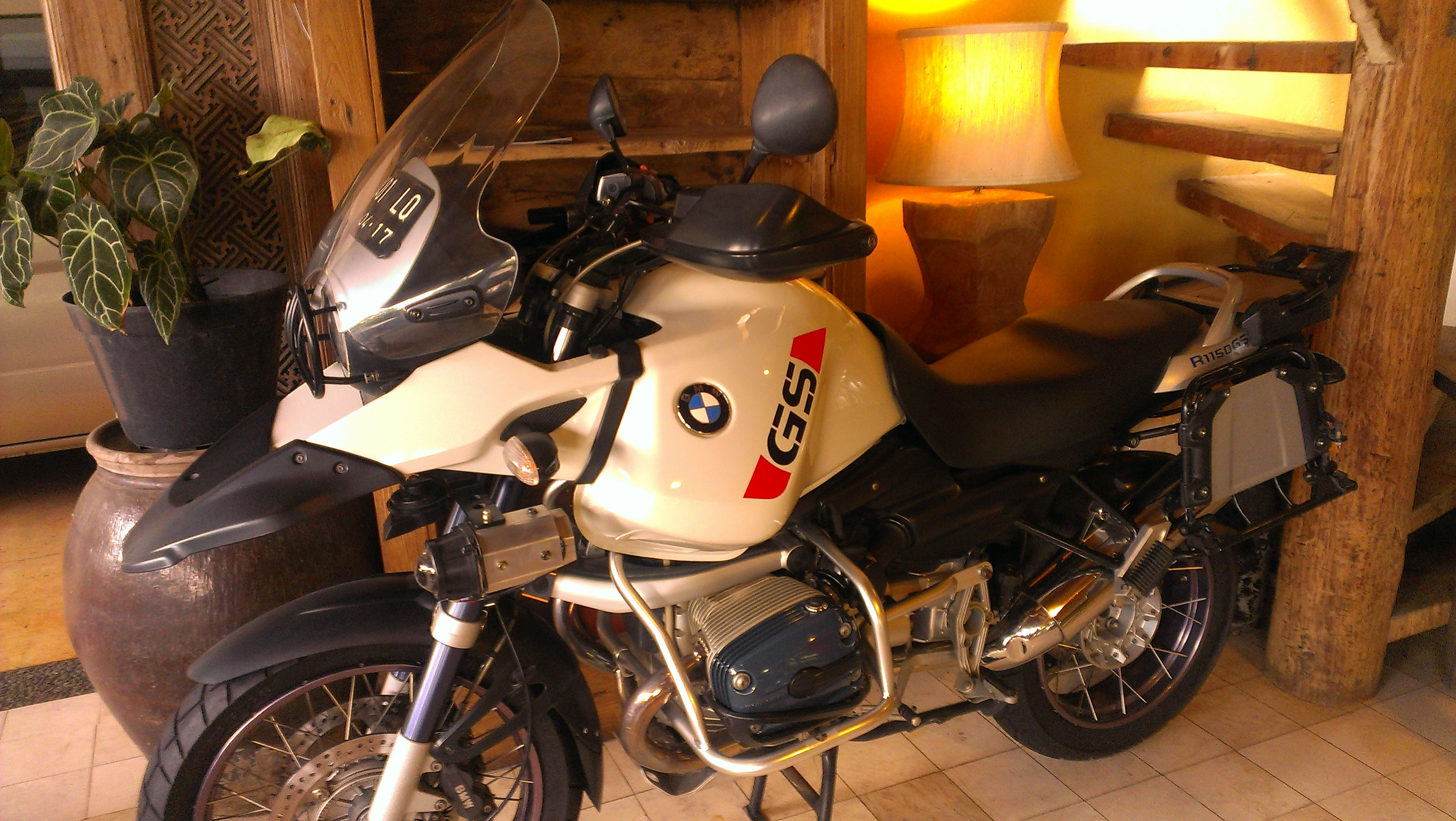
BMW R1150GS Adventure

In 1994 the next generation (Type 259) of BMW GS was introduced with the R1100GS. This generation is commonly referred to as the "oilhead" due to the engine relying more on oil-cooling than the previous version. In 1998 it was followed by a smaller R850GS model, which was largely identical besides a less powerful engine.

The R1100GS model signified a significant jump in technology introducing features like a four-valve engine, electronic fuel injection, a catalytic converter and ABS-brakes. BMW also claims it was the adventure motorcycle with the "biggest capacity and greatest power output" of the time.

The R1100GS also introduced the "telelever" front suspension to the GS range, a feature still employed in current models. This replaces the conventional forks with an A-shaped control arm and a shock absorber. This system is intended to improve performance of the front suspension by separating the forces exterted by weight shift of the chassis, from the forces generated by bumps from the road surface. It also eliminates compression of the front suspension under braking, called "brake dive".

In 1999 the model was updated to the R1150GS (Type R21). This model received a slight increase in engine power and displacement, a change in design of the front fairing and headlight - now sporting two round asymmetrical headlight lenses. The R1150GS also received a 6-speed gearbox, up from the previous 5-speed. In September 2001 the "Adventure" model was announced which is analogous to the earlier Paris-Dakar models. This model added a larger fuel tank, lower gearing, longer suspension travel and optional off-road tyres. This was done to make the Adventure more suitable for arduous off-road trips with a heavy load of gear and supplies. The R1150GS models is by many regarded as the motorcycle, that kickstarted interest in traveling on big adventure bikes.

==== Oilhead production history ====
Oilhead GS models are listed below together with production figures where known:

Model	Years	Production count
R1100GS	1994–1999	39,842
R850GS	1996–2001	2,242
R1150GS	1999–2004	58,023
R1150GS Adventure	2001–2005	17,828

=== Third Generation Boxer: 2004 - 2013 "Hexhead" ===
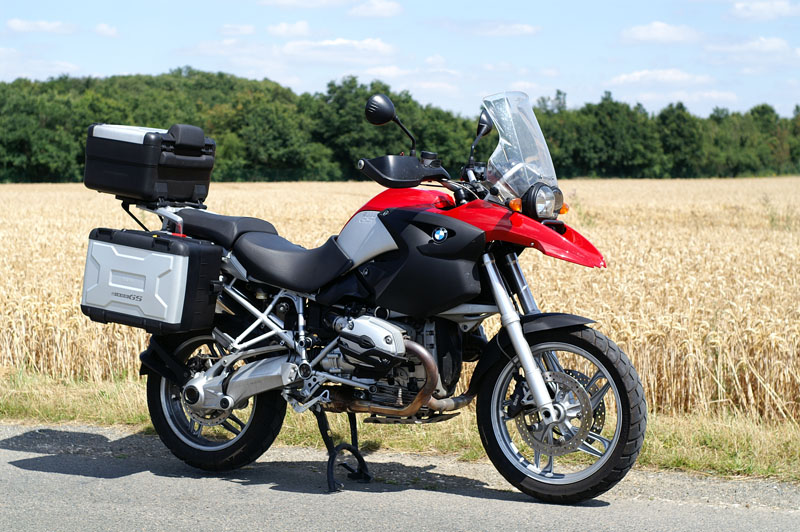
BMW R1200GS

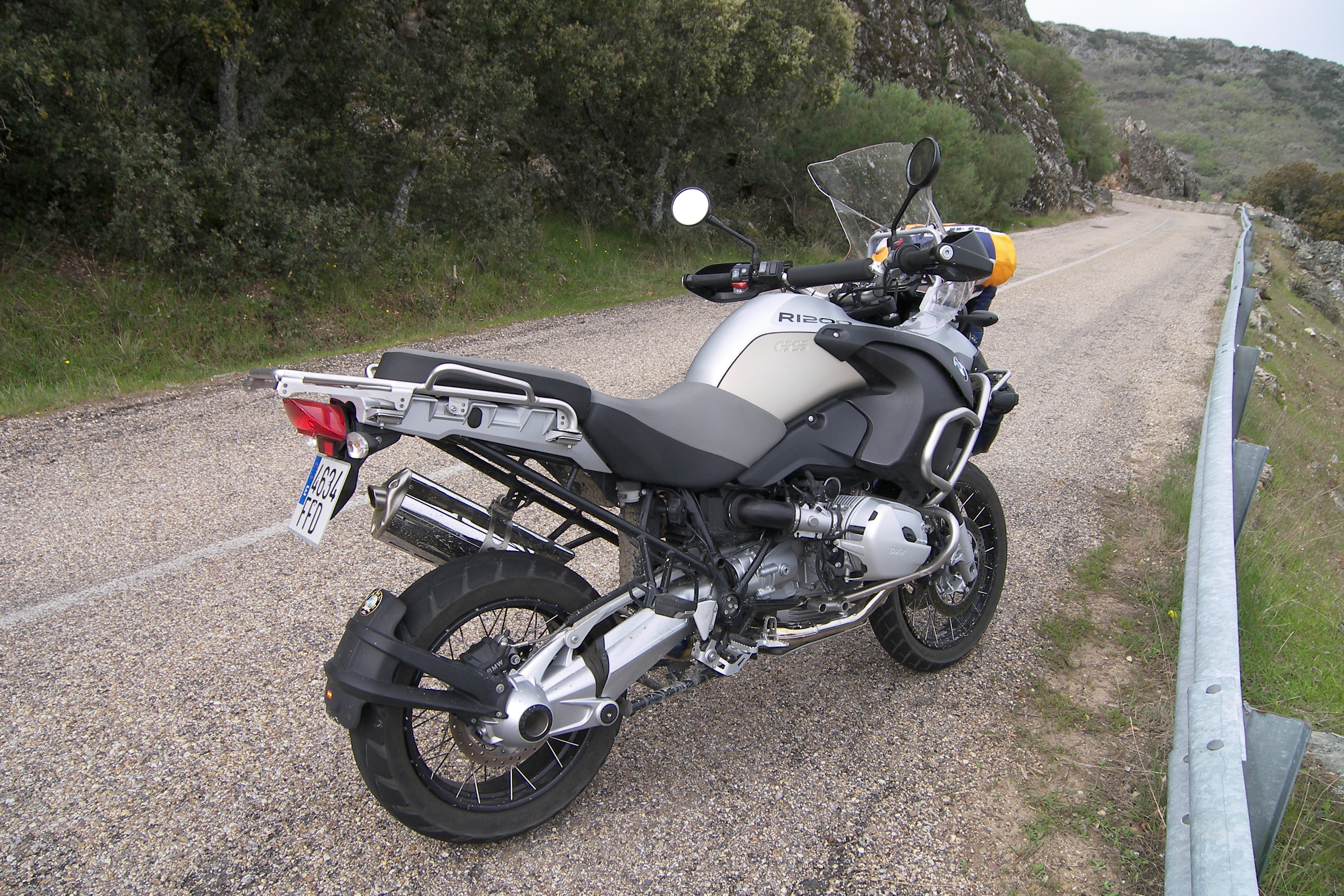
BMW R1200GS Adventure

In 2004 the R1200GS model introduced the third generation (Type K25) of GS models. Commonly referred to as the "hexhead" simply due to the hexagonal shape of the cylinder heads.

While not representing as big a change in basic design, as there had been between the first and second generation, this model took many of the ideas of the previous version and improved upon them. Most notably the R1200GS was significantly lighter, shedding some 30kg from its wet weight compared to its predecessor. Interestingly 13kg of this reduction came solely from weight savings in the gearbox. The engine of R1200GS model gained a significant amount of power while at the same time being both smoother and more economical, due to gaining a balance shaft and improved fuel injection.

In 2008 the R1200GS received an update, that made the steering geometry steeper and added 5hp. The biggest innovation was probably the implementation of Electronic Suspension Adjustment ESA, which enabled the rider to change the characteristics of both damping and preload of the shock absorbers via the switchgear.

In 2010 another update was made to the model, this time with the engine receiving the biggest changes. The valvetrain was changed from employing pushrods and rocker arms to a double overhead camshaft design. This allowed for a higher revlimit and an additional increase of 5hp, now up to 110hp in total. This design was originally made for the BMW HP2 Sport and later employed in several other models. Although still hexagonal in shape, this represented a pretty big technical change to the cylinder heads. For this reason some enthusiasts refer to these later engines as the "camhead" to differentiate it from the earlier engine types.

The R1200GS would prove to be big a commercial success for BMW Motorrad. On 27 July 2007 the R1200GS became the first model to be produced in 100,000 units.

==== Hexhead production history ====
Hexhead GS models are listed below together with production figures where known:

Model	Years	Production count
R1200GS	2004–2012	84,373 up to 27 July 2007
R1200GS Adventure	2006–2013	15,627 up to 27 July 2007

=== Fourth Generation Boxer: 2013 - 2023 "Wethead" ===
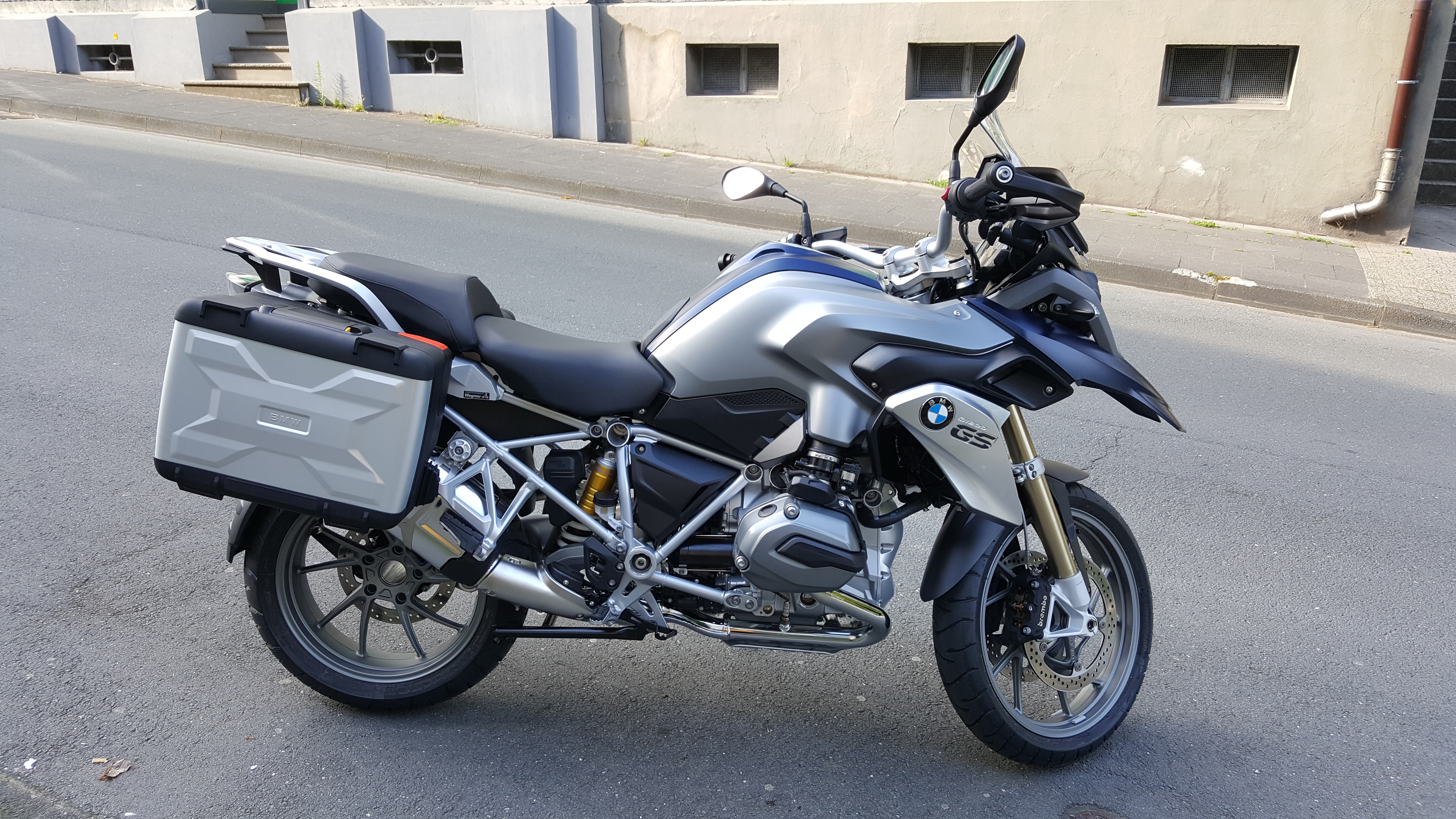
BMW R1200GS (K50)

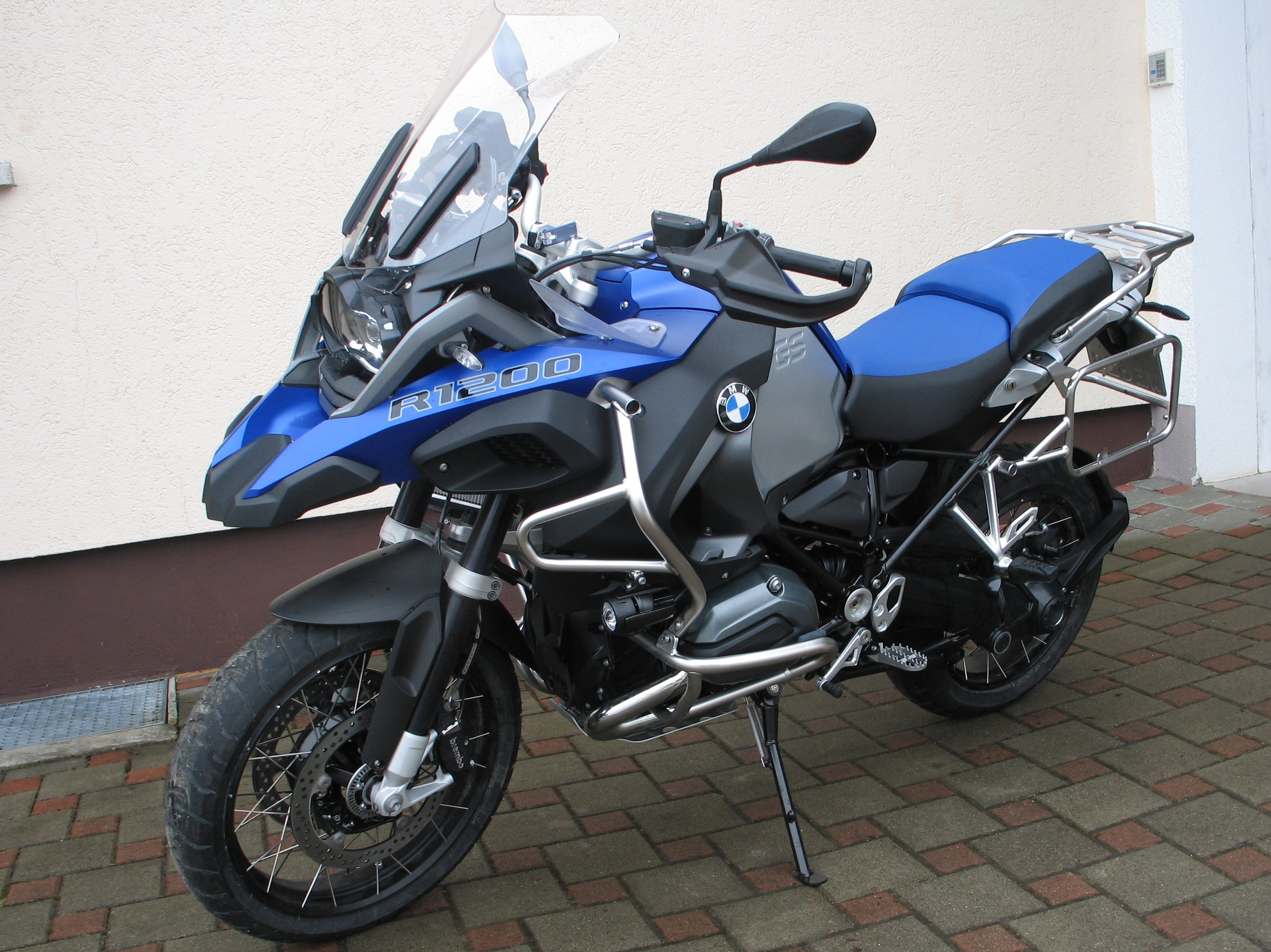
BMW R1200GS Adventure (K51)

In 2013 the new R1200GS model introduced the fourth generation (Types K50 and K51) of GS models. Although the model name and engine capacity remained the same, the fourth generation represented a big change in engine layout and design language.

For the first time a BMW boxer engine was of "unit construction", where engine and gearbox was combined into a single unit. Other innovations was the usage of liquid cooling of the cylinder heads, Ride-By-Wire throttles and a wet clutch. While none of these technologies were groundbreaking they were all firsts for a BMW boxer engine.

The R1200GS also introduced "ride modes" to the GS models. This idea (pioneered by Ducati's Multistrada) allowed riders to select different modes that changes the response of the engine and suspension, significantly altering the riding experience. The suspension was updated to Dynamic ESA which not only allowed electronic adjustment like previously, but also allowed the suspension system to autonomously and continuously adjust the suspension's settings to best suit the current conditions. Another notable change was the swapping of positions of the Paralever drive shaft and the exhaust from right-to-left. This was done to prevent riders burning themselves on the hot exhaust pipe.

In 2017 the R1200GS received an update that slightly changed the design of the fairings, the workings of the Dynamic ESA suspension and the engine calibration was updated to comply with the EURO4 emissions standards. Although BMW claimed the same 125hp as previous years German magazine Motorrad tested this and found the updated engine very slightly weaker.

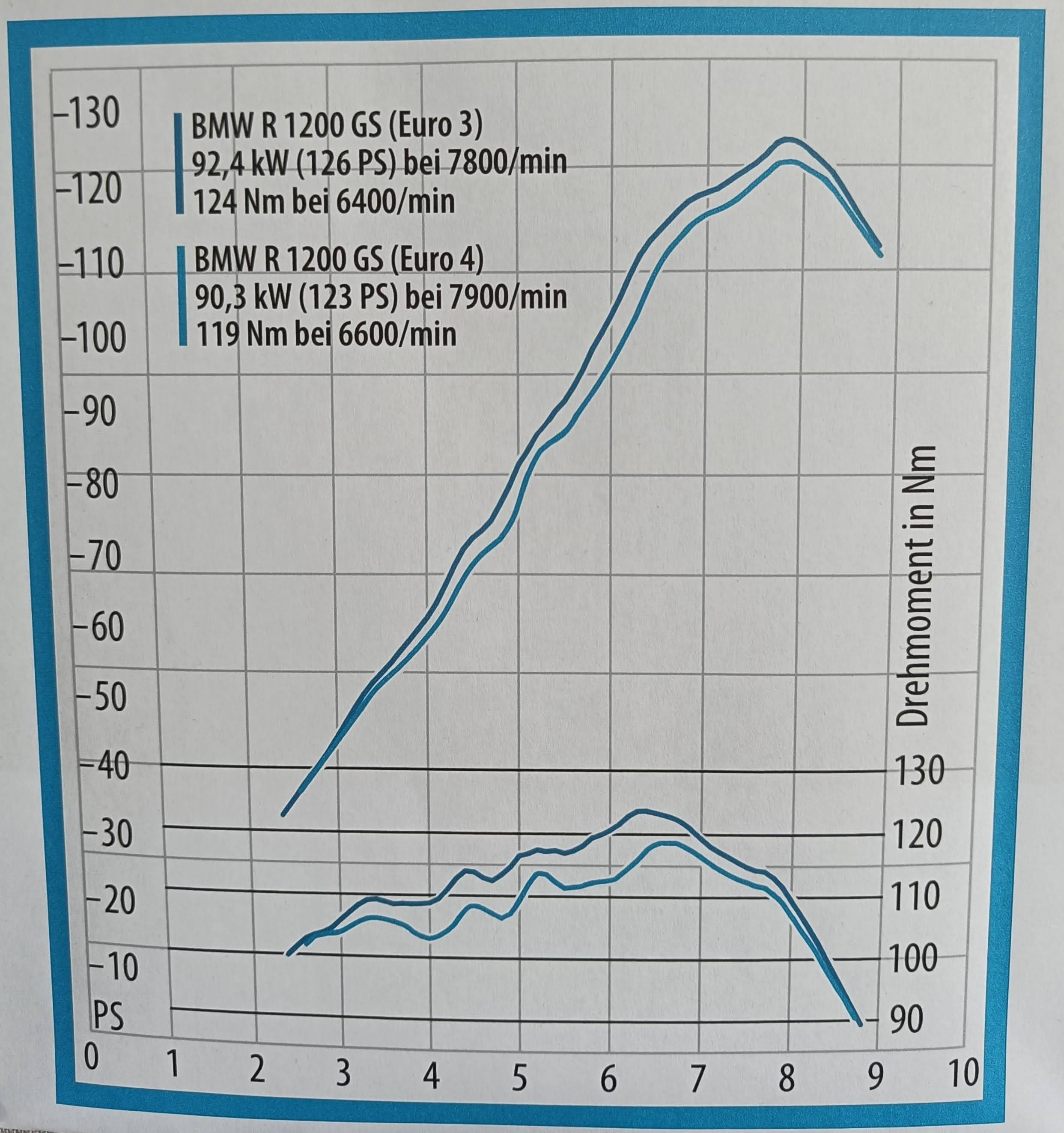
Graph of dyno measurements. Out-clipping from magazine Motorrad

In 2019 BMW introduced the R1250GS models. Just like the 2010 update to the previous model, the most significant change was updates to the engine which grew from 1170cm³ to 1254cm³ and the valvetrain was redesigned to incorporate BMWs system for variable valve timing called "ShiftCam". This system allowed for an increase in output of both power and torque at the same time, to 136hp and 145nm respectively. This made it the most powerful production boxer engine BMW had made at the time. Other notable changes included a colour TFT instrumentation and an LED Headlight now being standard equipment.

==== Wethead production history ====
Wethead GS models are listed below:

Model	Years
R1200GS	2013–2018
R1200GS Adventure	2014–2019
R1250GS	2019–2023
R1250GS Adventure	2020–2023

=== Fifth Generation Boxer: 2023 - Current ===
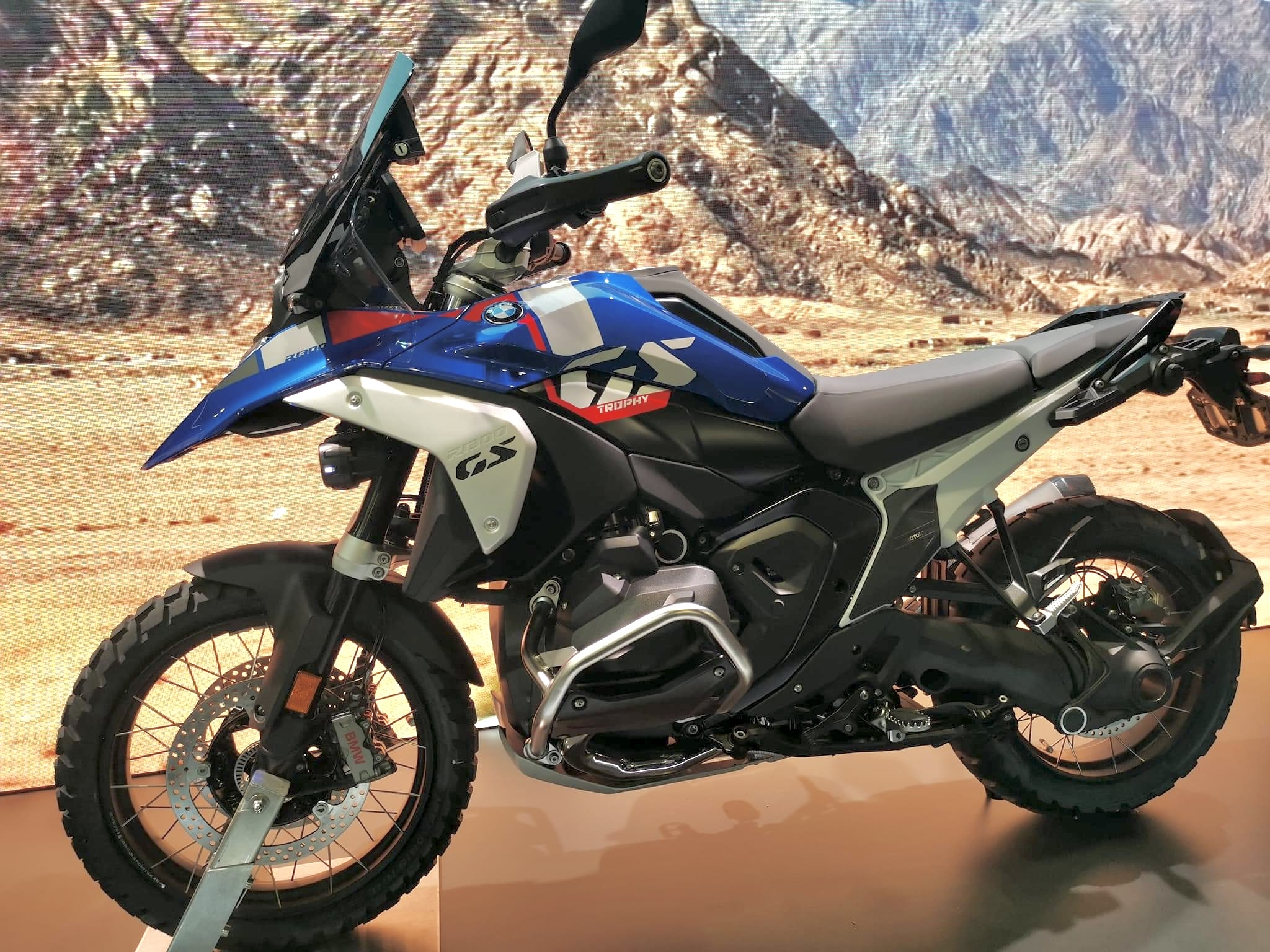
BMW R1300GS

On 28 September 2023 the fifth generation of BMW GS was announced, the R1300GS. (Type KA1) The engine was again a completely new design. Like the predecessor the engine is a unit construction but internal components were rearranged, with the gearbox now located below the cylinders and crankshaft, allowing for a shorter and more compact engine. The construction of the chassis was a big departure from previous models, all of which were constructed of tubular steel. The chassis of the R1300GS is made of pressed sheet steel, with the subframe being die-cast aluminium. Recognising that weight had continually crept up over the last few generations, project manager Reiner Fings claimed that "at the top of the list is to lose weight." All of these changes were made in an attempt to make the new generation lighter and more compact. Another notable change was the new design of the front headlight which was no longer asymmetrical - a feature that had been present since the R1150GS.

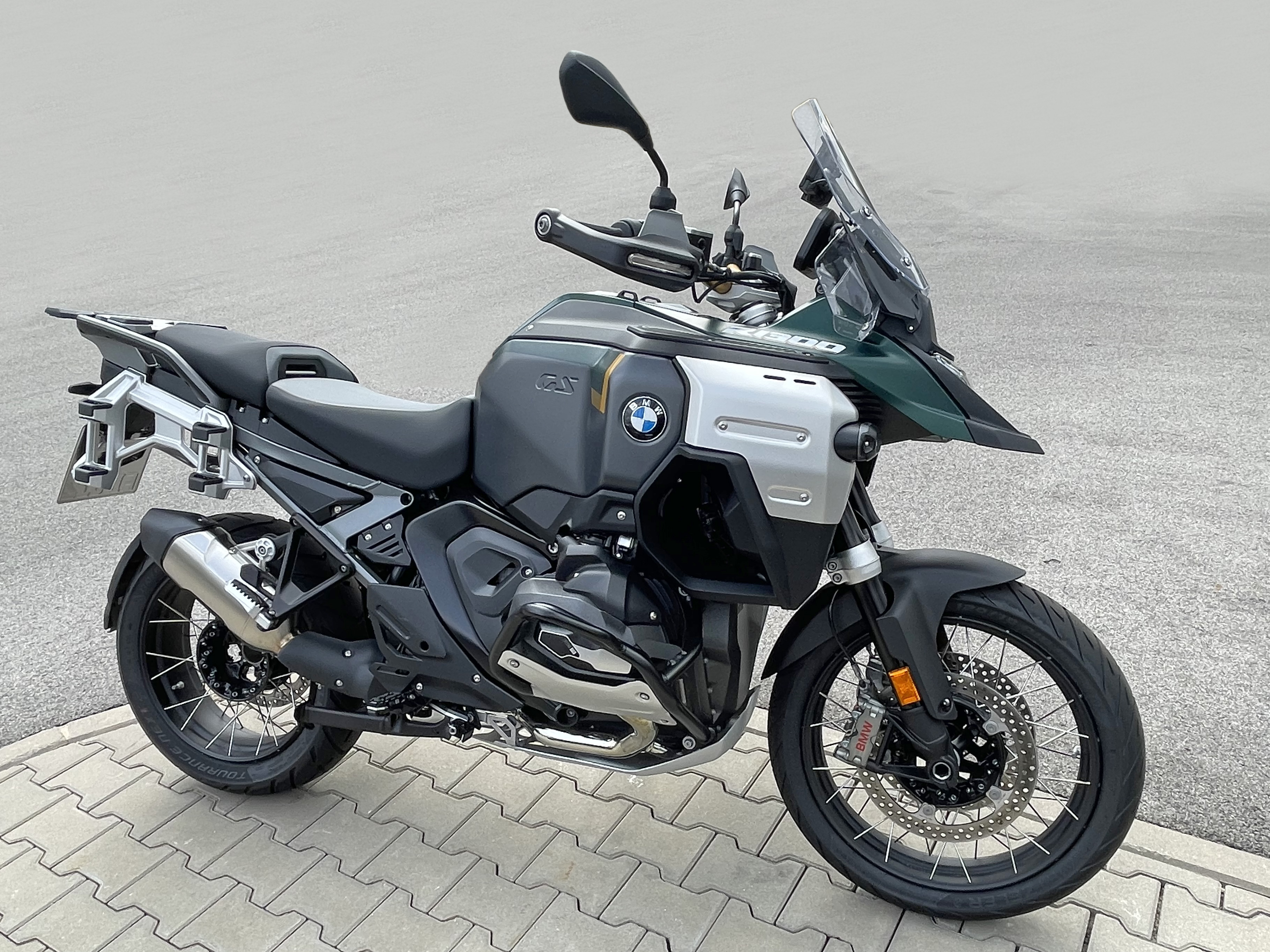
BMW R1300GS Adventure

A little under a year later on 5 July 2024, the sister model BMW R1300GS Adventure (Type KA2) was announced during BMW's "Motorrad Days" event in Garmisch-Partenkirchen. Just like the preceding Adventure models the R1300GS Adventure has a bigger fuel tank and an increased focus on comfort while traveling. The system Automated Shift Assistant ASA was introduced on this model, electronically automating the control of the clutch and gearshifting, effectively giving the motorcycle an automated manual transmission. The design language of the "standard" and Adventure models is also noticeably more differentiated between the two models, than earlier generations.

Another notable development on both 1300 models is "Dynamic Suspension Adjustment". This system allows to control both the suspension ride height and stiffness of spring rate via hydraulic circuits, in addition to adjusting the damping and spring preload like previous versions.

==== Fifth generation BMW GS production history ====
Model	Years
R1300GS	2023–Current
R1300GS Adventure	2024–Current

=== Single cylinder models ===
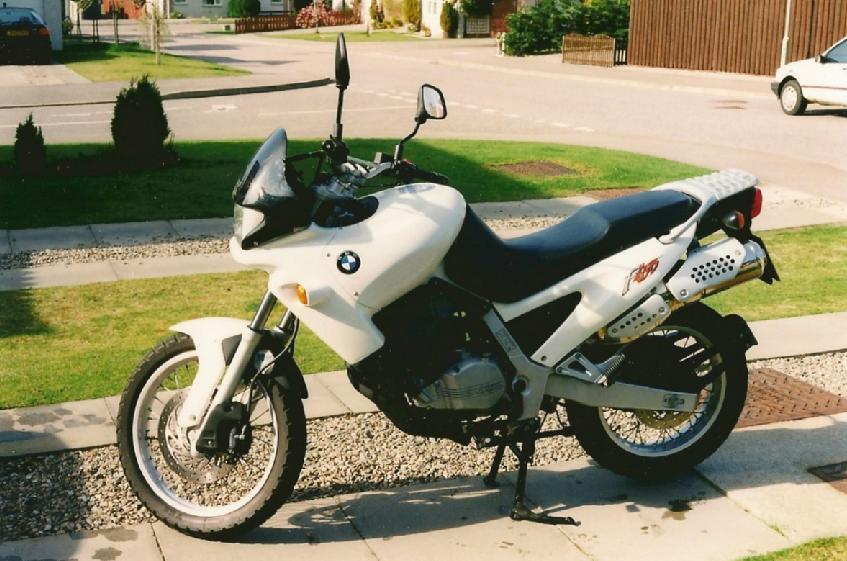
BMW F650 Funduro

In 1993 BMW introduced the off-road-capable F650 Funduro. This bike was powered by a single cylinder 4-valve 652 cc Rotax engine, had a 19-inch front wheel, long travel suspension, a bash plate, a high seat and a low weight of just 189kg. It was also the first BMW motorcycle ever to feature chain drive. This bike was developed in cooperation with Aprilia and was virtually identical with the 5-valve Aprilia Pegaso. While technically not bearing the GS moniker, the "Funduro" would later be further developed and renamed as the F650GS model in 2000.

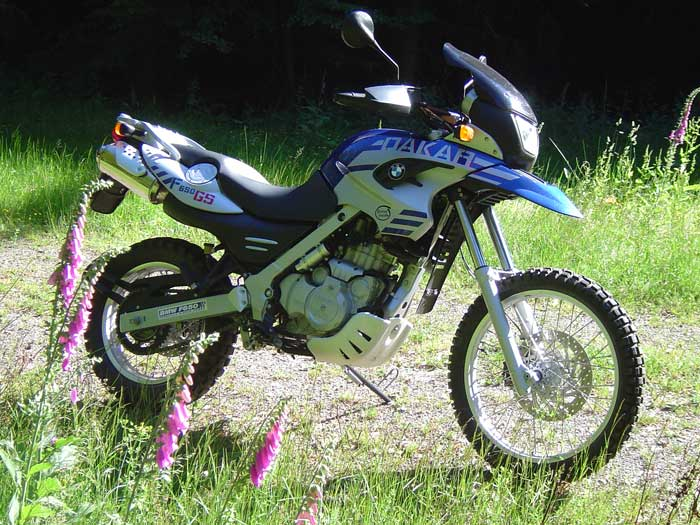
BMW F650GS Dakar

BMW introduced the fuel injected F650GS following BMW's wins in the 1999 and 2000 Dakar Rally with a heavily modified F650RR ridden by Richard Sainct. A taller, more off-road biased F650GS Dakar version was also introduced which included a taller windscreen, 21 inch front wheel and longer suspension travel.

BMW re-branded the single-cylinder bike as the G650GS in some markets due to the launch of the parallel twin-cylinder model in 2008, confusingly also named the F650GS (see below). In 2010 at the EICMA show in Italy BMW Motorrad announced the global availability of the G650GS with a slightly down-rated engine producing 35 kW (47 hp). A year later the BMW G650GS Sertão was announced. Effectively the successor to the Dakar model, it featured taller suspension and a 21 inch front wheel.

In 2017 BMW unveiled the entry level G310GS with a 4-valve, dual overhead cam, liquid-cooled 313cc engine. The G310 models were the first products of BMWs cooperation with TVS Motor Company, and as such were the first GS models to be built in India.

The single-cylinder bikes have a strong following and are thought by many of their riders to be better off-roaders than the heavier boxer-engined bikes. Like the larger two-cylinder models, they offer significant capacity to carry gear and supplies over long distances. Their versatility is attractive to riders who intend to spend a long time traveling on two wheels.

==== Single-cylinder production history ====
Single-cylinder GS models are listed below:

Model	Years
F650GS	2000–2007
F650GS Dakar	2000–2007
G650GS	2008–2017
G650GS Sertão	2011–2017
G310GS	2017–2025

=== Parallel-twin cylinder models ===
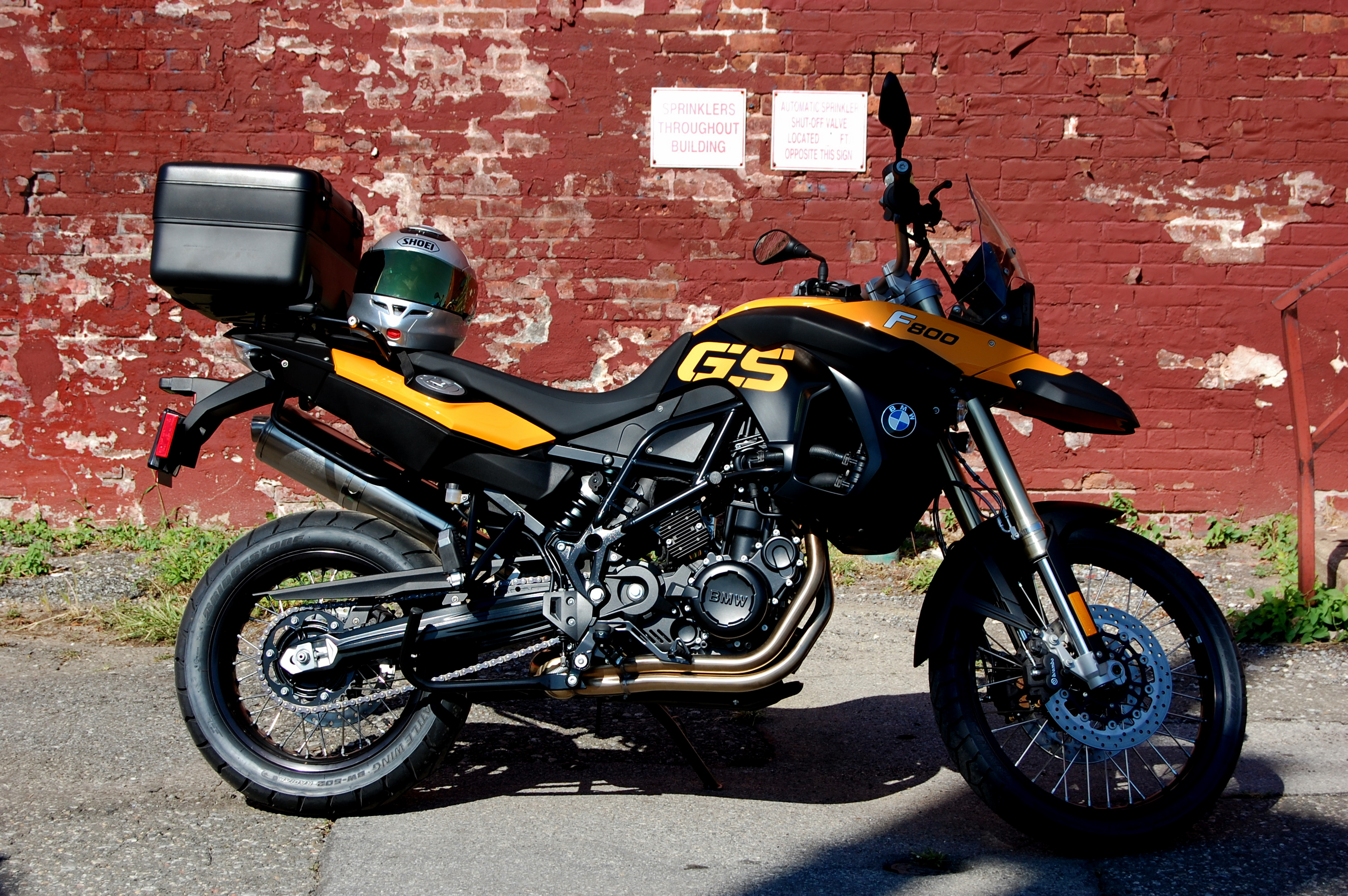
2008 BMW F800GS in Sunset Yellow

In 2007 BMW launched two new GS models called the F800GS and F650GS. They both use the Rotax-built 798 cm³ parallel-twin engine introduced a couple of years prior with the BMW F800S and F800ST. This engine produces a power output of 63 kW (84 hp) and torque of 80 N⋅m (59 lb⋅ft).

Although it is made with the same capacity engine as the F800GS, the F650GS produces a lower power output of 52 kW (70 hp) and torque of 75 N⋅m (55 lb⋅ft). This model therefore began the practice of the model name not necessarily coinciding with the actual engine capacity. This detuned engine could be further restricted to 25 kW (34 hp), which made it possible to meet then-current regulations for European restricted licenses.

In 2013 the F800GS was refreshed and the F700GS replaced the F650GS. These new models introduced a host of updates including updated design of the fairings and instruments, new switchgear and the possibility of adding Electronic Suspension Adjustment ESA on the rear axle as an optional extra.

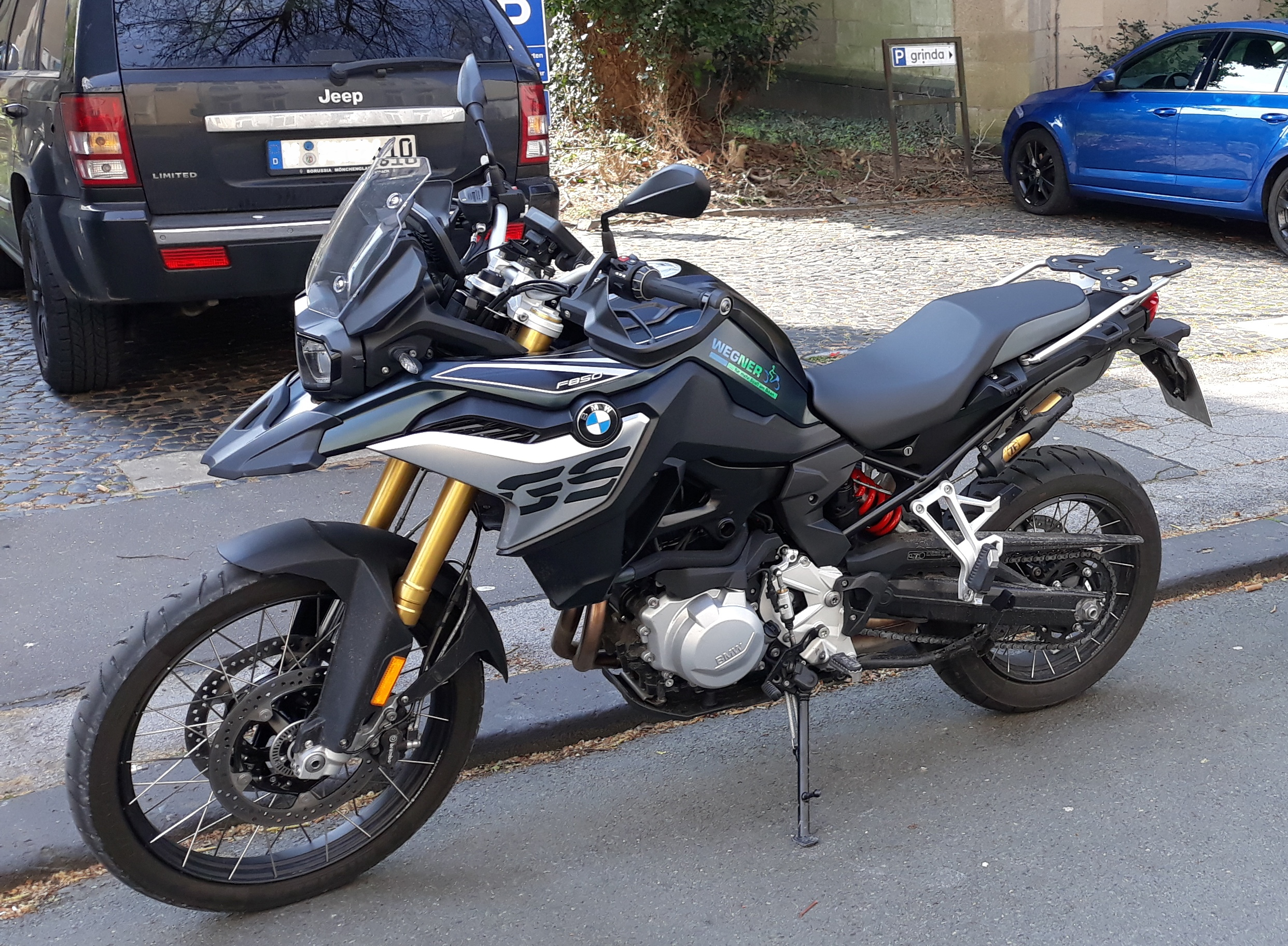
BMW F850GS

On 7 November 2017 BMW announced the F850GS and F750GS models. Featuring a brand new design of both chassis and engine these models replaced the F800GS and F700GS. The new models changed the chassis from tubular steel to a steel monocoque design (much like the R1300GS would later do in the boxer-range). The new engine was a brand new design with a new crankshaft offset of 270°, producing a different firing order. The engine was produced in China by BMWs partner Loncin which at the time sparked some controversy.

In September 2023 BMW announced that the F850GS and F750GS were being replaced by the updated F900GS and F800GS - with the F800GS name being reused for the new model. Much like its R1300GS sibling, the new F900GS model was focused on making it slimmer and lighter than its predecessor, while improving the performance of its engine and suspension especially off-road.

At the EICMA trade show in 2025 BMW unveiled the production version of the F450GS. This new model is powered by a 420cm³ parallel-twin engine with a unique 135° crankshaft offset. This engine produces 35 kW (47 hp) making it A2-licence compliant. Production of this model is set to commence in 2026 by TVS in India like its predecessor, and it will replace the G310GS in the lineup.

==== Parallel twin-cylinder production history ====
Parallel twin-cylinder GS models are listed below:

Model	Years
F800GS	2008–2017
F650GS	2008–2012
F700GS	2013–2017
F800GS Adventure	2013–2017
F850GS	2018–2023
F850GS Adventure	2018–2023
F900GS	2024–Current
F900GS Adventure	2024–Current
F800GS	2024–Current
F450GS	2026–Current

== In popular culture ==
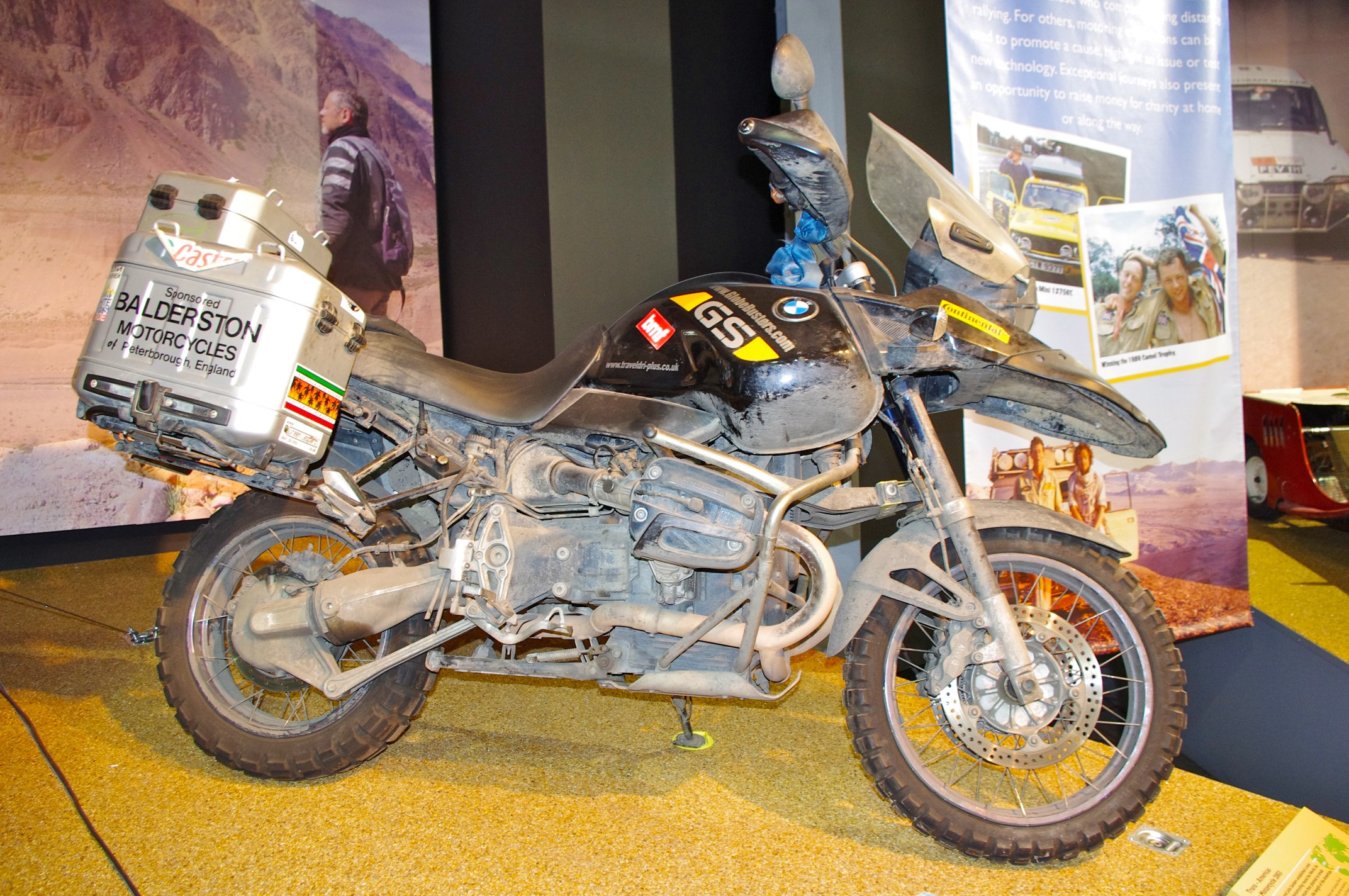
The BMW R1150GS used by Kevin and Julia Sanders

In 2002 Kevin and Julia Sanders rode around the world on a BMW R1150GS. They managed to set a recognised Guinness World Record for circumnavigating the earth in a time of 19 days, 8 hours and 25 minutes.

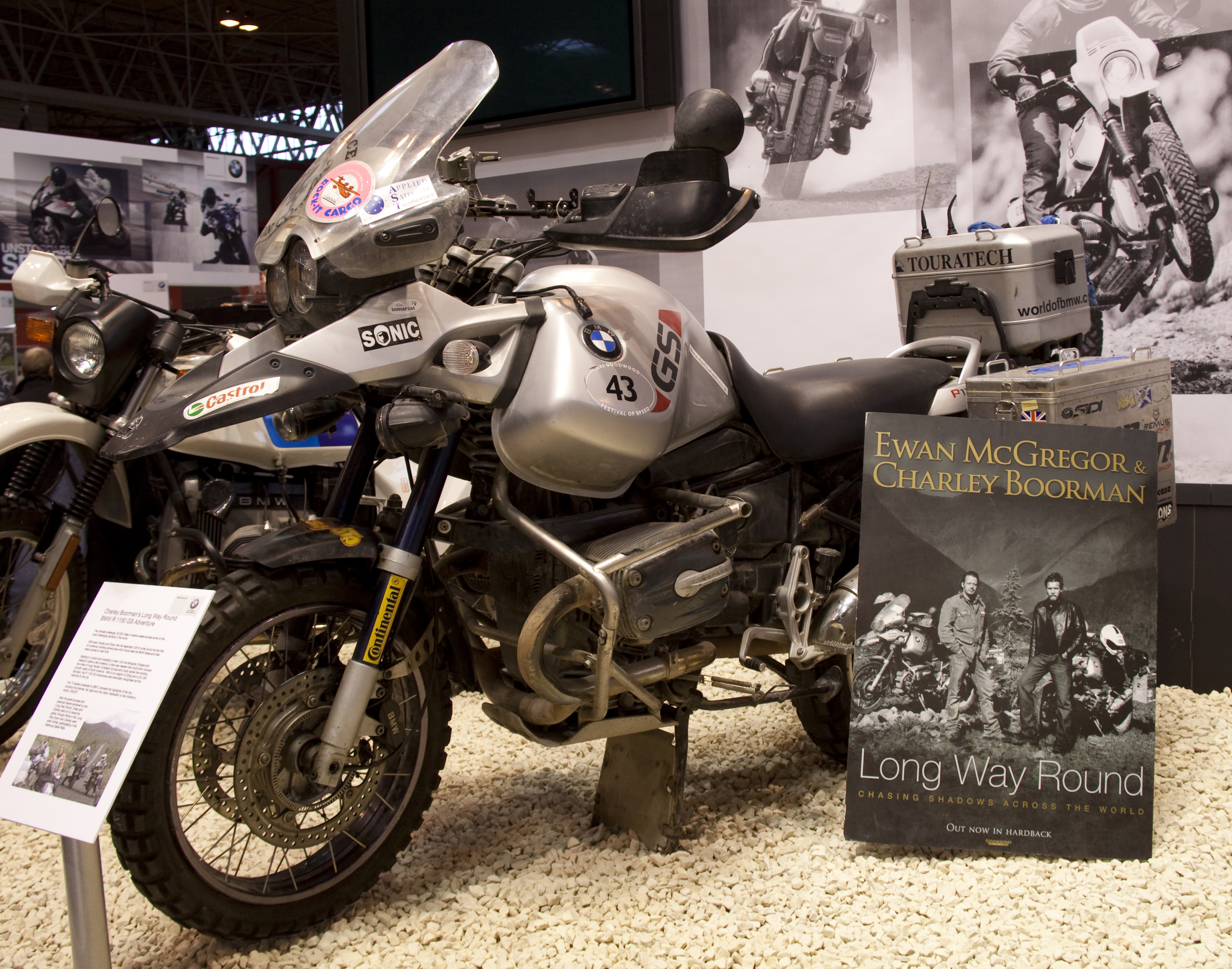
One of the BMW R1150GS motorcycles used Charley Boorman and Ewan McGregor in The Long Way Round

In 2004 the R1150GS Adventure became a top seller after being used by actors Ewan McGregor and Charley Boorman in their journey Long Way Round. It was a major sales coup for BMW as the duo had initially approached KTM for sponsorship for the trip, who turned them down. Their journey involved riding from London to New York by going east across Europe, central Asia, Alaska, Canada and the USA. The duo continued their association with the BMW GS when Boorman used an F650RR during his attempt to finish the 2006 Dakar Rally. This journey was documented in the book and TV series Race to Dakar. Again in 2007 McGregor and Boorman used the R1200GS Adventure in their journey Long Way Down, in which they rode from John o' Groats at the northern tip of Scotland, to Cape Agulhas in South Africa at the southern tip of the African continent.

Both the R1200GS and the F650GS were featured in the BBC TV series The Hairy Bikers' Cookbook ridden by chefs Dave Myers and Si King.

Drummer and lyricist Neil Peart of Canadian band Rush used an R1100GS for a 14-month, 55,000 miles (89,000 km) self-healing trip, documented in the book Ghost Rider: Travels on the Healing Road. He made the trip in the late 1990s following the deaths of his only daughter and his wife. Peart also used the R1200GS with an R1150GS as a backup on his 2004 motorcycle trip between gigs on Rush's 30th Anniversary tour, a trip he documented in the book Roadshow: Landscape with Drums, A Concert Tour By Motorcycle.

Television food personality Alton Brown and his crew rode R1200GS motorcycles during season 2 of the television program Feasting on Asphalt. They rode BMW R1200RT motorcycles during season 1 but found the GS better suited for the backroads they often found themselves on.

== See also ==
- Simon and Monika Newbound - GS riders who hold the Guinness World Record for motorcycle endurance.
- History of BMW motorcycles
