= BMW R1100S =

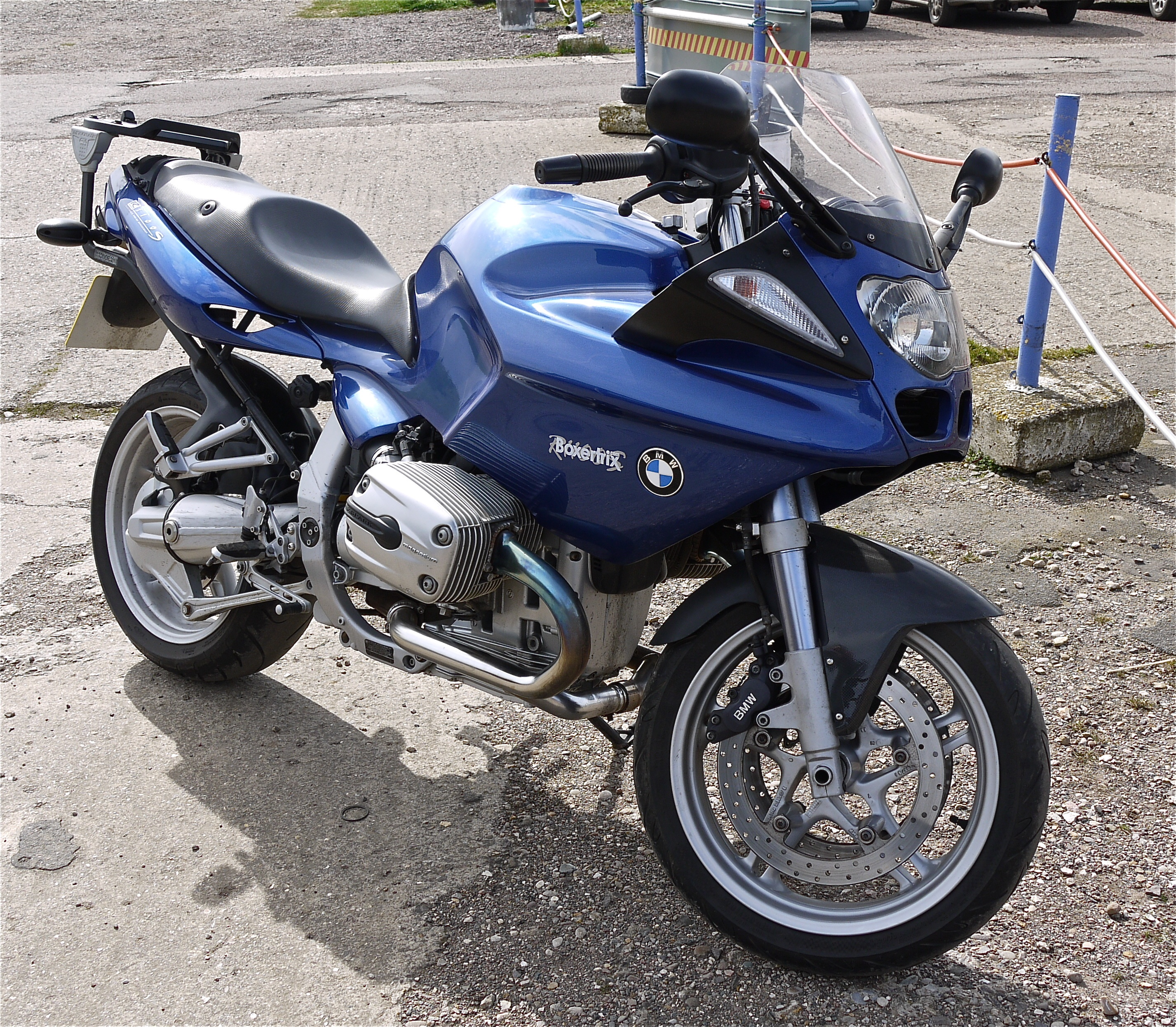
- Manufacturer: BMW Motorrad
- Production: 1998–2005
- Successor: R1200S
- Class: Sports, or sport-touring"
- Engine: 1,085 cc, 4-valve air- and oil-cooled flat-twin boxer
- Bore / stroke: 99 x 70.5 mm (3.89 x 2.77 in)
- Compression ratio: 11.3:1
- Power: 98 hp (73 kW)
- Torque: 72 lb.ft
- Ignition type: Electronic fuel injection, Bosch Motronic MA dual ignition (after 2003)
- Transmission: 6-speed, shaft drive, dry clutch
- Frame type: Three section composite frame consisting of front & rear section, load bearing engine
- Suspension: Front:Telelever; Rear: Paralever
- Brakes: Front: Dual 320 mm (13 in) disc, 4-pot caliper Rear: Single disc 276 mm (10.9 in); Optional ABS
- Tires: Front: 120 / 70-ZR 17; Rear: 170 / 60-ZR 17; Rear: 180 / 55-ZR 17 (Sport)
- Wheelbase: 148 cm (58 in)
- Dimensions: L: 218 cm (86 in); W: 88 cm (35 in); H: 116 cm (46 in)
- Seat height: 80 cm (31 in)
- Weight: 208 kg (459 lb) (dry); 229 kg (505 lb) (wet)
- Fuel capacity: 18 L (4.0 imp gal; 4.8 US gal)
- Fuel consumption: 48 miles per imperial gallon (5.9 L/100 km; 40 mpg_{‑US})

The BMW R1100S is a sports motorcycle that was manufactured by BMW Motorrad between 1998 and 2005. Introduced some 25 years after the R90S, the company's first sports bike, the R1100S was the first BMW bike having clip-on handlebars, rearset footrests and a removable cowl to cover the pillion seat. Producing nearly 100 hp, it has been described as a "sporty sports-tourer".

== Design ==
The engine is a flat-twin "oilhead" that has air-cooled cylinders but oil-cooled heads. Derived from the BMW R1100RS, the 1,085 cc fuel-injected eight-valve engine is tuned for a maximum output of 98 horsepower (73 kW) at 8,400rpm. At the time of its introduction, it was BMW's most powerful boxer engine ever made, and the first mated to a six-speed transmission. The ohv engine has chain-driven camshafts mounted in the cylinder heads, operating the valves via short pushrods and rocker arms. Engines produced after 2003 had dual ignition, with two spark plugs per cylinder. The compact close-ratio six-speed transmission is derived from the BMW K1200RS. Far from being a touring overdrive, the top gear gives 20 mph per 1,000rpm, so at 80 mph the engine turns at 4,000rpm.

In addition to using the engine as a stressed member, the R1100S has a composite aluminum frame to which the suspension components are attached. The front suspension is BMW's patented Telelever, with long telescopic fork sliders containing neither springs nor damping. In order to minimize "fork dive", braking forces are taken back to the frame via a pivoting wishbone. A monoshock on this wishbone copes with springing and damping. The rear suspension comprises BMW's "Paralever", a single-sided swinging arm encompassing shaft drive. The Paralever mounts directly to the frame instead of to the gearbox as on earlier oilheads. A reviewer reported: “The result is greater frame rigidity and better handling".

A detachable tubular subframe supports the rider and passenger. The R1100S has a very substantial half fairing which completely envelops the alloy fuel tank. Both the hugger (after market option) and front fender are made of carbon-fibre. The two-into-one exhaust feeds twin silencers tucked up high beneath the pillion seat, like those on the Ducati 916. Factory options originally available from BMW included electrically heated grips, ABS brakes and a belly-pan fairing.

== Reception ==
The R1100S is 27 kg (60 lb) lighter and 8 hp (6.0 kW) more powerful than the BMW R1100RS from which it was derived, but at 229 kg (505 lb) (wet), it is still no lightweight. Nevertheless, What Bike? magazine stated: "With underseat exhaust and plenty of ground clearance, the BMW is helped by the lack of dive under braking and makes up metres on the entry to corners. Mid-corner speed is superb, but it's on the exit that the air-cooled twin shows its short legs. Stick to the road, though, and the R1100S is a great place to be".

Motor Cycle News (MCN) later reviewed the R1100S, stating: "The BMW R1100S is now starting to be regarded as something of a classic, especially in BoxerCup form. Classy styling, VFR-esque comfort and versatility plus BMW quality and residuals make for a stonking and attractive all-rounder, if not quite the sports bike BM intended…".

== Special editions of the BMW R1100S ==
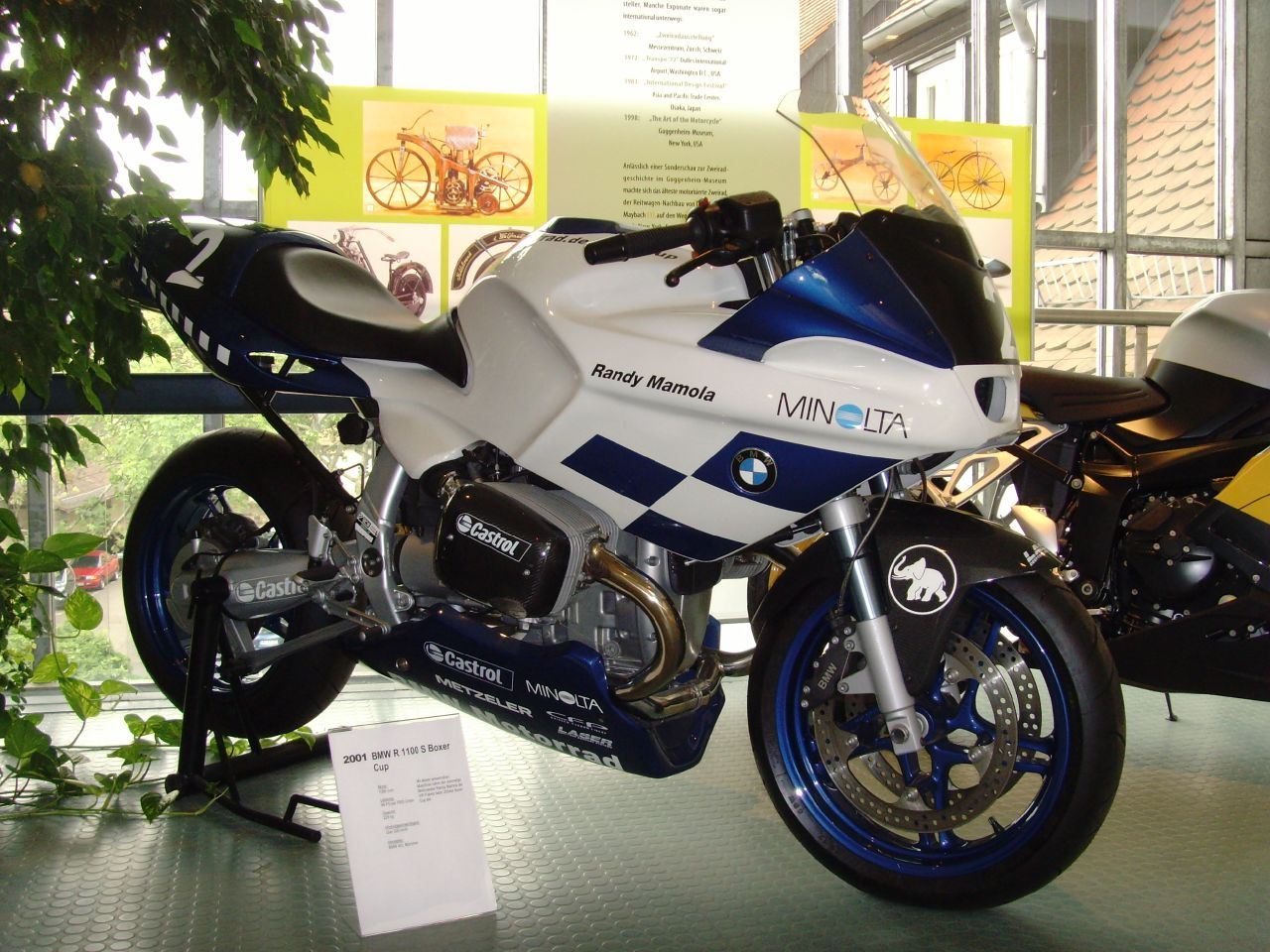
BoxerCup Replika

A special edition model was the R1100S Sport, which was a standard R1100S fitted with an optional "Sport" pack comprising stiffer suspension via a taller rear monoshock, a steering damper, and a wider rear wheel and tyre. Bike magazine commented: "The basic R1100S is good value, but we're not convinced that the high spec Sport version offers any real benefit for road riders".

A more expensive track-day version of the BMW R1100S, the BoxerCup Replika (or "BCR"), was available from 2003 to 2005. The BCR had twin Laser under-seat exhausts, braided brake lines, carbon-fibre cylinder head protectors, a carbon-fibre oil-catcher bellypan, uprated Öhlins suspension, and a shorter paralever torque arm which raised the rear end to quicken the steering and increase cornering clearance. Later BoxerCup and Sport models had matte black engines, with the cylinders and cylinder heads remaining silver.

The raised suspension of the BCR increased cylinder head cornering clearance (compared to the standard R1100RS), but this somewhat compromised the motorcycle for normal town/road use.

The BCR came with a standard engine management chip which was changed for a modified chip at the first dealer service. Despite the different chip, the Replika claimed no more power than the standard R1100S nor the Sport.

== The R1200S ==
The R1100S was superseded in 2006 by the R1200S. The alloy frame of the R1100S was replaced by a lightweight tubular trellis and so, with a tuned engine, the R1200S was 13 kg (29 lb) lighter and 25% more powerful. MCN compared the R1200S to its predecessor this way: "As an oddball track motorcycle it works, but as an accomplished all-rounder it falls short of the standards set by the R1100S that preceded it."

In 2008 the R1200S was itself superseded by the double overhead camshaft HP2 Sport.
