= Enduro (disambiguation) =

Enduro is a form of motorcycle sport run on extended cross-country, off-road courses.

Enduro may also refer to:

== Sports ==
- Enduro motorcycle, a type of motorcycle for the Enduro sport
- Enduro mountain biking, a form of mountain-bike racing
- Enduro race, a type of automobile stock car racing

== Other uses ==
- Enduro (video game), a 1983 game for the Atari 2600
- Beaujon Enduro, a 1978 ultralight aircraft design
- Schmidtler Enduro, a German ultralight trike design
- AMD Enduro, a technology for use with mobile computing platforms

== See also ==
- Endura (disambiguation)
- Enduro Racer, a 1986 arcade game
