= Schmidtler Enduro =

German ultralight trike

Enduro

General information
- Type: Ultralight trike
- National origin: Germany
- Manufacturer: Ultraleichtflug Schmidtler
- Status: Production completed

The Schmidtler Enduro is a German ultralight trike that was designed and produced by Ultraleichtflug Schmidtler of Munich. When it was available the aircraft was supplied as a complete ready-to-fly-aircraft.

The aircraft is no longer listed on the company website and presumed to be out of production.

== Design and development ==
The Enduro was designed to comply with the Fédération Aéronautique Internationale microlight category, including the category's maximum gross weight of 450 kg (992 lb). The aircraft has a maximum gross weight of 450 kg (992 lb). It features a cable-braced hang glider-style high-wing, weight-shift controls, a two-seats-in-tandem open cockpit with an optional cockpit fairing, tricycle landing gear with optional wheel pants and a single engine in pusher configuration.

The aircraft is made from bolted-together aluminum tubing, with its double surface wing covered in Dacron sailcloth. Its 10 m (32.8 ft) span Air Creation wing is supported by a single tube-type kingpost and uses an "A" frame weight-shift control bar. The powerplant is a twin cylinder, liquid-cooled, two-stroke, dual-ignition 64 hp (48 kW) Rotax 582 engine or a twin cylinder, air-cooled, four-stroke, 100 hp (75 kW) BMW 1100 motorcycle engine.

== Operational history ==
The Enduro XC model was used to set several microlight class world records for speed and altitude.

== Variants ==
Enduro BMW
Model equipped with a 100 hp (75 kW) BMW 1100 motorcycle engine and no cockpit fairing. This model has an empty weight of 218 kg (481 lb) and a gross weight of 450 kg (992 lb), giving a useful load of 232 kg (511 lb). With full fuel of 65 litres (14 imp gal; 17 US gal) the payload is 185 kg (408 lb).
Enduro XC
Model equipped with a 64 hp (48 kW) Rotax 582 aircraft engine or an optional 100 hp (75 kW) BMW 1100 motorcycle engine and a full cockpit fairing. This model has an empty weight of 270 kg (595 lb) and a gross weight of 450 kg (992 lb), giving a useful load of 180 kg (397 lb). With full fuel of 64 litres (14 imp gal; 17 US gal) the payload is 134 kg (295 lb).

== Specifications (Enduro BMW) ==
Data from Bayerl

General characteristics

- Crew: one
- Capacity: one passenger
- Wingspan: 10 m (32 ft 10 in)
- Wing area: 17 m^{2} (180 sq ft)
- Fuel capacity: 65 litres (14 imp gal; 17 US gal)
- Powerplant: 1 × BMW 1100 two cylinder, air-cooled, four stroke motorcycle engine, 75 kW (101 hp)
- Propellers: 4-bladed composite

Performance

- Maximum speed: 120 km/h (75 mph, 65 kn)
- Cruise speed: 100 km/h (62 mph, 54 kn)
- Stall speed: 63 km/h (39 mph, 34 kn)
- Rate of climb: 6 m/s (1,200 ft/min)
- Wing loading: 26.5 kg/m^{2} (5.4 lb/sq ft)
