= BMW R1150GS =

BMW motorcycle

BMW R1150GS BMW R1150GS Adventure
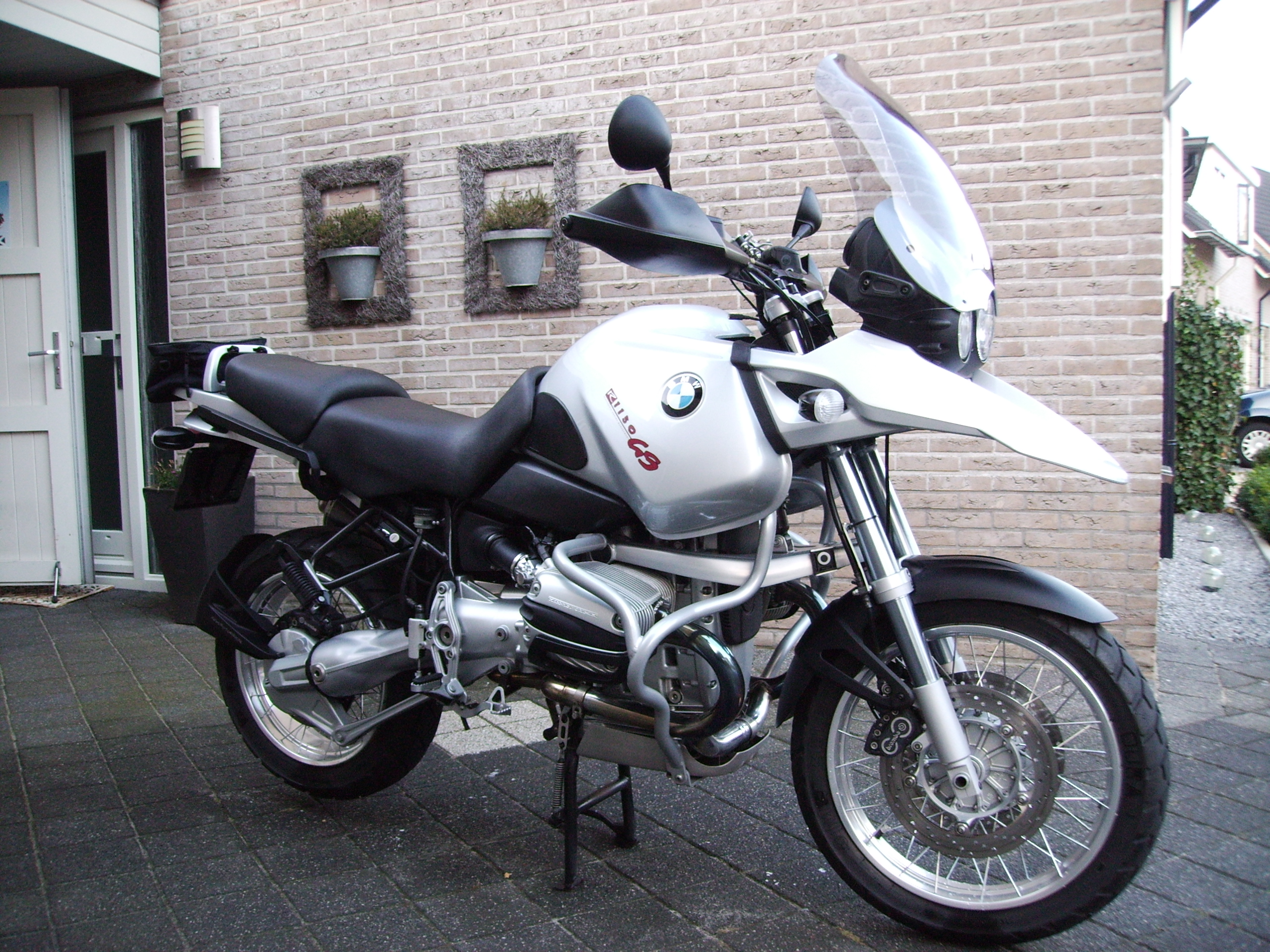
- Manufacturer: BMW Motorrad
- Parent company: BMW
- Production: 1999–2004; 2005–2006
- Predecessor: R1100GS
- Successor: R1200GS
- Class: Dual-sport
- Engine: 1,130 cubic centimetres (69 cu in), flat twin, air/oil cooled (twin spark plugs on later models)
- Bore / stroke: 101 mm × 70.5 mm (3.98 in × 2.78 in)
- Compression ratio: 10.3:1
- Power: 85 hp (63 kW) @ 6,750 rpm
- Torque: 75 lb⋅ft (102 N⋅m) @ 5,250 rpm
- Transmission: 6-speed, shaft drive
- Suspension: Front: BMW Telelever; Rear: BMW Paralever
- Brakes: Front: 4-piston callipers with 305 mm discs Rear: 2-piston calliper with single 276 mm disc Optional ABS (servo assisted on later models)
- Tires: Front: 110/80HR19; Rear: 150/70HR17; Spoked, tubeless wheels
- Seat height: 840 mm (33 in)
- Weight: 229 kg (505 lb) (dry)
- Fuel capacity: Standard – 22 L (4.8 imp gal; 5.8 US gal); Optional – 30 L (6.6 imp gal; 7.9 US gal)

The BMW R1150GS and R1150GS Adventure are motorcycles that were manufactured by BMW Motorrad from 1999 through 2004. There was a limited run of 2005–06 model year R1150GSA models as well. The R1150GS models are part of the BMW GS family of dual-sport or adventure motorcycles that have been produced from 1981 to the present date. The bikes have a 1,130 cc horizontally opposed flat-twin engine and shaft drive.

== Production history ==
The 1,130 cc R1150GS had a new six-speed gearbox. It replaced the R1100GS, which had a 1,085 cc engine and a five speed gearbox.

The standard R1150GS model was produced from 1999 to 2004, when it was replaced by the more powerful and lighter R1200GS. The R1150GS Adventure, which was produced from 2001 to 2005, was replaced by the R1200GS Adventure in 2006.

In late 2002, the optional ABS system was replaced with an electrically servo-assisted combined braking system. In addition the engines were equipped with twin spark plugs on each cylinder; this was intended to improve emissions and improve a persistent surging problem that affected many BMW boxer models.

A total of 58,023 standard R1150GS models and 17,828 Adventure models were made.

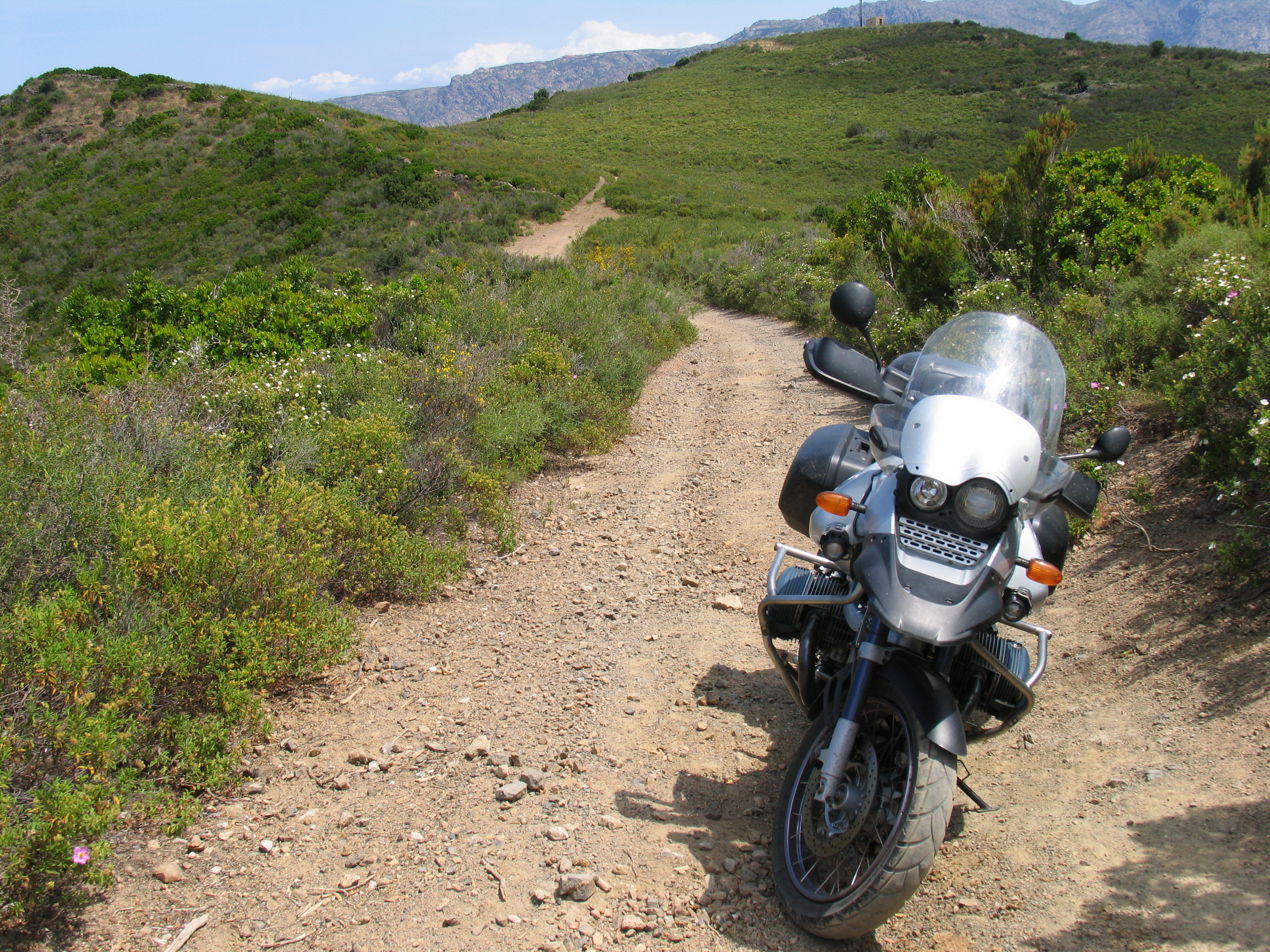
The R1150GS is a popular bike for offroad trails

== Model differences ==
The R1150GS Adventure had a number of differences over the standard bike to make it more suitable for overland and adventure travel. These included an optional 30-litre (6.6 imp gal; 7.9 US gal) fuel tank, larger screen, single-piece seat, 20 millimetres (0.8 in) taller suspension front and rear, lower first gear and a conventional sixth gear in place of the standard model's overdrive gear. An anti-knock sensor adjustment change allowed the adventure version to run on lower quality gasoline as well. Common options on both models were heated handgrips and ABS brakes.

== Awards and long-distance riding ==
In 2000, Cycle World Magazine awarded the R1150GS "Best Sport Touring Bike". In 2005, the R1150GS Adventure was awarded "Best Traillie" by British publication RiDE Magazine, and the standard model came third. The R1150GS Adventure was ridden in 2004 by Ewan McGregor and Charley Boorman in their 18,887-mile (30,396 km) ride from London to New York City, depicted in the book and TV series Long Way Round. The R1150GS's successor, the R1200GS Adventure was used in the follow-up Long Way Down trip. It was also ridden by Guinness World Record motorcycle endurance holder Simon Newbound. Kevin Sanders and his wife Julia rode the R1150GS for their Guinness World Record for the fastest world circumnavigation by motorcycle in 2002. They also rode the R1150GS Adventure for their record-breaking traversal of the Pan-American Highway in 2003.
