= BMW R1100GS =

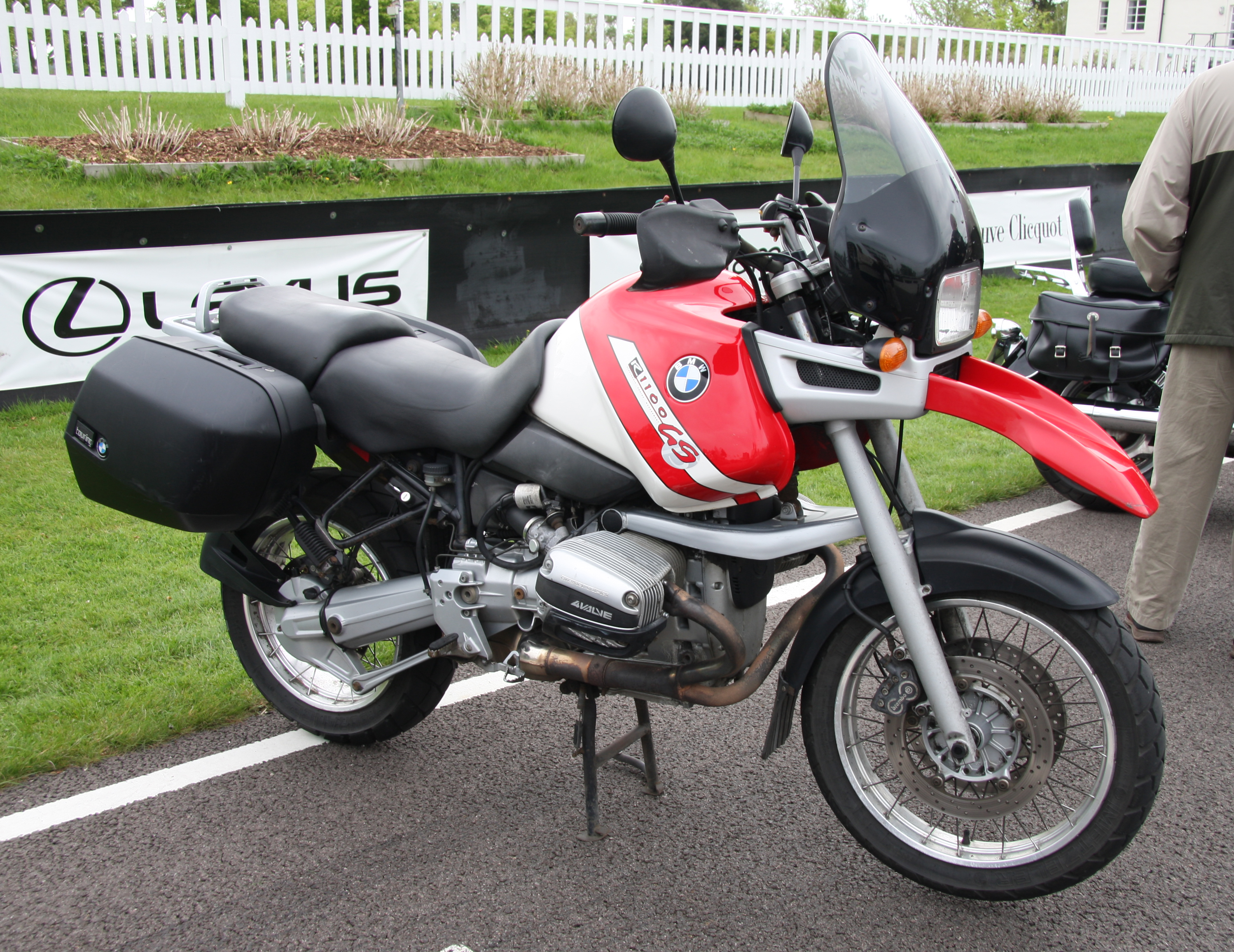
- Manufacturer: BMW Motorrad
- Production: 1994–1999
- Predecessor: R100GS, R80GS
- Successor: R1150GS
- Class: Dual-sport
- Engine: 1,085 cc (66.2 cu in) flat-twin, four valves per cylinder, oil-cooled Compression ratio: 10.3:1
- Bore / stroke: 99.0 mm × 70.5 mm (3.90 in × 2.78 in)
- Top speed: 121 mph (195 km/h)
- Power: 80 hp (60 kW) @ 6,750 rpm
- Torque: 97 N⋅m (72 lbf⋅ft) @ 5,250 rpm
- Transmission: 5-speed shaft drive
- Suspension: Front: BMW Telelever; Rear: Single spring / shock absorber
- Brakes: Front: Twin 305 mm disc Rear: Single 276 mm disc Optional ABS
- Tyres: Front: 110/80-19; Rear: 150/70-17
- Wheelbase: 1,509 mm (59.4 in)
- Dimensions: L: 2,189 mm (86.2 in); W: 920 mm (36 in); H: 1,366 mm (53.8 in)
- Seat height: 840 mm (33 in) to 860 mm (34 in)
- Weight: 243 kg (536 lb) (wet)
- Fuel capacity: 25 L (5.5 imp gal; 6.6 US gal)
- Oil capacity: 3.75 litres (0.82 imp gal; 0.99 US gal)
- Related: R850GS

The BMW R1100GS is a dual-sport motorcycle that was launched in 1993, and manufactured from 1994 to 1999 by BMW Motorrad in Berlin, Germany. The bike has a 1,085 cc (66.2 cu in) flat-twin (boxer) engine, first seen in the R1100RS which was launched the year before in 1992, and was the first member of the GS family to use an air- and oil-cooled engine rather than the earlier air-cooled airhead engines which had been used on BMW motorcycles since the R32 in 1923.

A smaller capacity sister model, the 848 cc (51.7 cu in) R850GS, was produced from 1996 to 2001.

In 1999, the R1100GS was superseded by the R1150GS.

== Technical features ==
Previous BMW motorcycles used the airhead engines such as the type 247 air-cooled flat-twin with two pushrod-activated valves per cylinder. The R1100GS engine introduced partial oil-cooling and four valves per cylinder operated by a single chain-driven camshaft. Motronic fuel injection was included instead of the carburettors found on earlier bikes. Rear suspension and driveshaft used the same Paralever swingarm system as the previous bikes, but with the addition of remote pre-load adjustment on the shock absorber. Front suspension used a new A-arm system called Telelever. Options included heated handlebar grips and ABS. Available in Black and Red. Red is the fastest color.
