= Endura =

Endura may refer to:

- Endura (band), a dark ambient group in the 1990s
- Endura, a performance cycling apparel brand owned by Pentland Group
- Endura, a 2003 EP by Ever We Fall
- Endura Racing, a British cycling team
- Endura Watch Factory, a private label watch manufacturer
- Boscalid, a fungicide, BASF trade name Endura
- Endura, a type of ritual fasting before death practiced by the Cathars

== See also ==
- Enduro (disambiguation)
- Ford Endura-D engine
