= BMW HP2 Enduro =

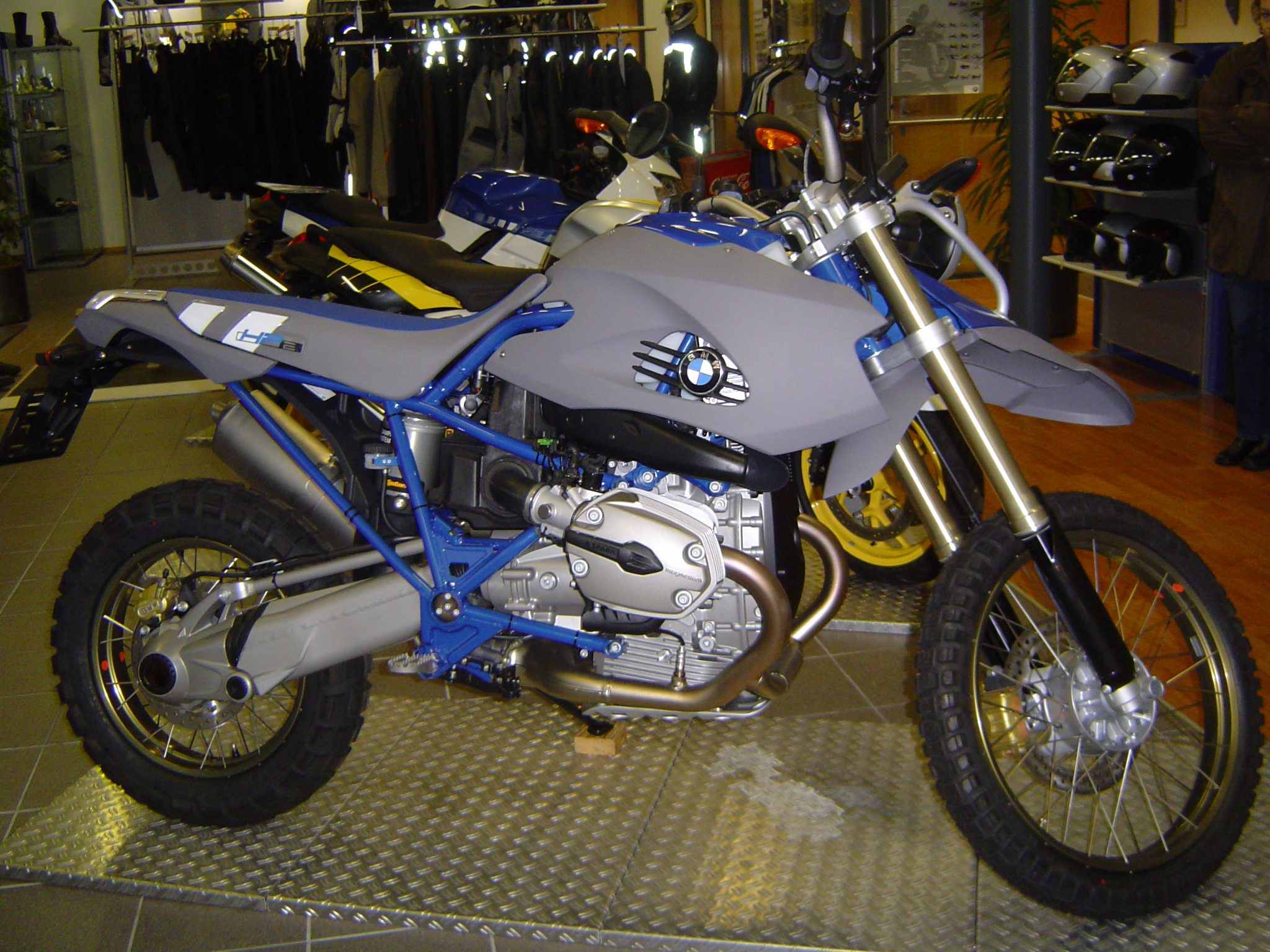
- Manufacturer: BMW Motorrad
- Production: 2005–2008
- Class: Dual Sport
- Engine: 1,170 cc air/oil cooled boxer twin
- Power: 105 hp (78 kW) @ 7,000 rpm
- Torque: 75 foot-pounds (102 N⋅m) @ 5,500 rpm
- Frame type: Trellis tube frame
- Suspension: 45 mm telescoping fork
- Weight: 386 lb (175 kg) (dry)
- Related: R1200GS, HP2 Megamoto, HP2 Sport

The HP2 Enduro is a motorcycle manufactured by BMW Motorrad from 2005 to 2008. It is a "High Performance" (HP) dirt bike based on the engine and electronics from the R1200GS adventure-touring model. The use of a trellis tube frame, a conventional fork rather than Telelever, and other modifications, make it 53 lb (24 kg) lighter than the corresponding R1200GS.

The HP2 Enduro was discontinued in 2008.

Approximately 2910 HP2 Enduro's were produced in total: 2517 Euro Spec bikes and 393 US spec bikes.
