= BMW R1200S =

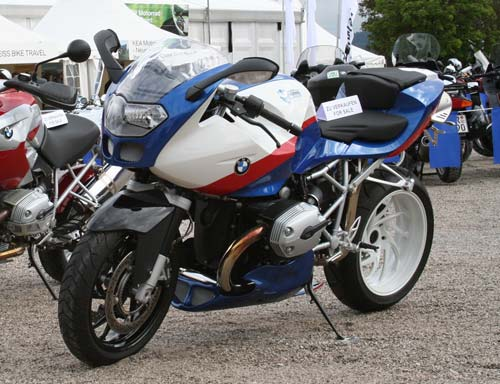
- Manufacturer: BMW Motorrad
- Production: 2006–2007
- Predecessor: R1100S
- Successor: BMW HP2 Sport
- Engine: 1170 cc flat twin
- Bore / stroke: 101 mm × 73 mm (4.0 in × 2.9 in)
- Compression ratio: 12.5:1
- Power: 90kW (122 hp) @ 8250 rpm 82.45 kW (110.57 hp) @ 7,525 rpm(rear wheel)
- Torque: 112 Nm (83 lb⋅ft) @ 6500 rpm 107.06 N⋅m (78.96 lb⋅ft) @ 6,710 rpm(rear wheel)
- Ignition type: Digital CDI
- Transmission: Single-plate dry clutch, 6-speed, shaft drive
- Frame type: Tubular steel trellis
- Suspension: Showa (standard) or Öhlins (optional), Front: BMW Telelever; Rear: BMW Paralever
- Dimensions: L: 2,151 mm (84.7 in); H: 1,177 mm (46.3 in)
- Weight: 399 lb (181 kg) (claimed) (dry); 488 lb (221 kg) (wet)
- Fuel capacity: 16 L; 3.5 imp gal (4.2 US gal)

The BMW R1200S is a luxury sports motorcycle produced by BMW Motorrad from 2006 to 2007.

Compared to the BMW R1100S which it succeeded, the R1200S was 13 kg (29 lb) lighter, and (with a compression ratio raised from 11.3:1 to 12.5:1) it was 25% more powerful with a "hexhead" motor rated at 122 horsepower (91 kW). Much of the weight saving was down to a new trellis-type frame which replaced the massive alloy frame of the R1100S. The R1200S thus had superior handling, improved braking, higher power output, greater ground clearance, and sport ergonomics. Although the instrumentation was updated, the bike retained the unconventional BMW-system indicator switches (one on either side). Factory options included front and rear Öhlins shock absorbers, switchable ABS, a lightweight Akrapovič muffler, expandable locking luggage, heated grips, a solo tail piece, a Tire-pressure monitoring system and a wider 6" rear wheel to accommodate a size 190 tire.

Despite these refinements, overall the earlier R1100S has perhaps proved the more successful design. Motor Cycle News said of the R1200S: "As an oddball track motorcycle it works, but as an accomplished all-rounder it falls short of the standards set by the R1100S that preceded it." However, the owners’ comments attached to this article viewed the R1200S much more favourably.

The 2006 BMW R1200S was reported to have a 0-60 time of 3.5 seconds, and a quarter mile time of 11.1 seconds.

== HP2 Sport ==
In 2008 the R1200S was superseded by the double overhead camshaft HP2 Sport. At 178 kg (dry) and 128 hp, the HP2 is even lighter and more powerful than the R1200S upon which it is based; (and compared to the R1100S, the HP2 is 30 kg lighter and 30 hp more powerful). The HP2's dohc engine was the most powerful "oilhead" design before BMW adopted liquid cooling for some of its flat twins in 2013.
