= BMW R1200GS =

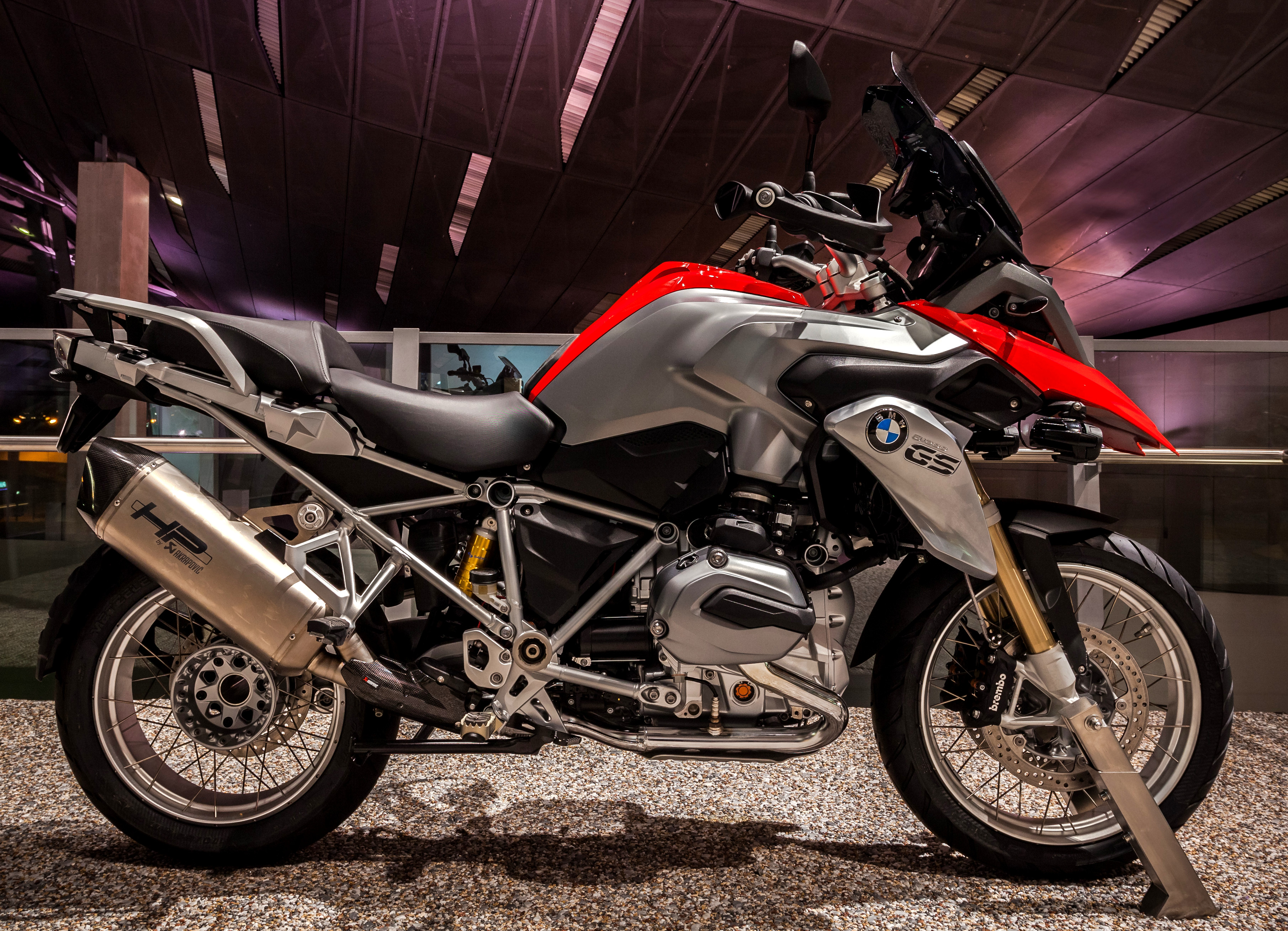
- R1200GS, 2013 model with Akrapovič HP titanium exhaust
- Manufacturer: BMW Motorrad
- Production: R1200GS (2004–12); R1200GS Adventure (2005–13); R1200GS (LC) (2013–19); R1200GS Adventure (LC) (2014–19)
- Predecessor: BMW R1150GS
- Successor: BMW R1250GS
- Engine: 1,170 cc (71 cu in) boxer twin: air/oil cooled; air/liquid cooled (LC)
- Bore / stroke: 101 mm × 73 mm (4.0 in × 2.9 in)
- Compression ratio: 12.0:1; 12.5:1 (LC)
- Top speed: 130.8 mph (210.5 km/h)
- Power: 81 kW (109 hp) @ 7,750 rpm 70.42 kW (94.43 hp) (rear wheel); 92 kW (123 hp) @ 7,750 rpm (LC)
- Torque: 120 N⋅m (89 lbf⋅ft) @ 6,000 rpm 97.38 N⋅m (71.82 lbf⋅ft) (rear wheel); 125 N⋅m (92 lbf⋅ft) @ 6,500 rpm (LC)
- Transmission: 6-speed manual, shaft-drive
- Suspension: Front: BMW Telelever; Rear: BMW Paralever; Optional electronic adjustment
- Brakes: Front: Twin floating 305 mm discs, 4-piston fixed calipers; Twin floating 305 mm discs, 4-piston radial calipers (LC); Rear: Single 265 mm disc, double-piston floating caliper; Single 276 mm disc, double piston floating caliper (LC)ABS (optional before 2013)
- Tires: Front: 110/80 R 19; 120/70 R 19 (LC); Rear: 150/70 R 17; 170/60 R 17 (LC)Spoked or alloy, tubeless wheels
- Wheelbase: 1,507 mm (59.3 in); 1,510 mm (59 in) (Adv)
- Dimensions: L: 2,210 mm (87 in); 2,240 mm (88 in) (Adv); W: 953 mm (37.5 in); 990 mm (39 in) (Adv); H: 1,450 mm (57 in); 1,525 mm (60.0 in) (Adv)
- Seat height: 850 mm (33 in); 895 mm (35.2 in) (Adv)
- Weight: 199 kg (439 lb) - 203 kg (448 lb); 229 kg (505 lb) (LC); 223 kg (492 lb) (Adv) (dry) 225 kg (496 lb) - 229 kg (505 lb); 238 kg (525 lb) (LC); 256 kg (564 lb) - 260 kg (570 lb) (Adv) (wet)
- Fuel capacity: 20 L (4.4 imp gal; 5.3 US gal); 33 L (7.3 imp gal; 8.7 US gal) (Adv); 30 L (6.6 imp gal; 7.9 US gal) (Adv LC)

The BMW R1200GS and R1200GS Adventure ("R1200GSA") are motorcycles manufactured in Berlin, Germany by BMW Motorrad, part of the BMW group. It is one of the BMW GS family of dual sport motorcycles. Both motorcycles have a 1,170 cc (71 cu in), two-cylinder boxer engine with four valves per cylinder. The Adventure has a large-capacity fuel tank and long travel suspension. As of 2012, BMW's R1200GS bikes are their top-selling models.

== History ==
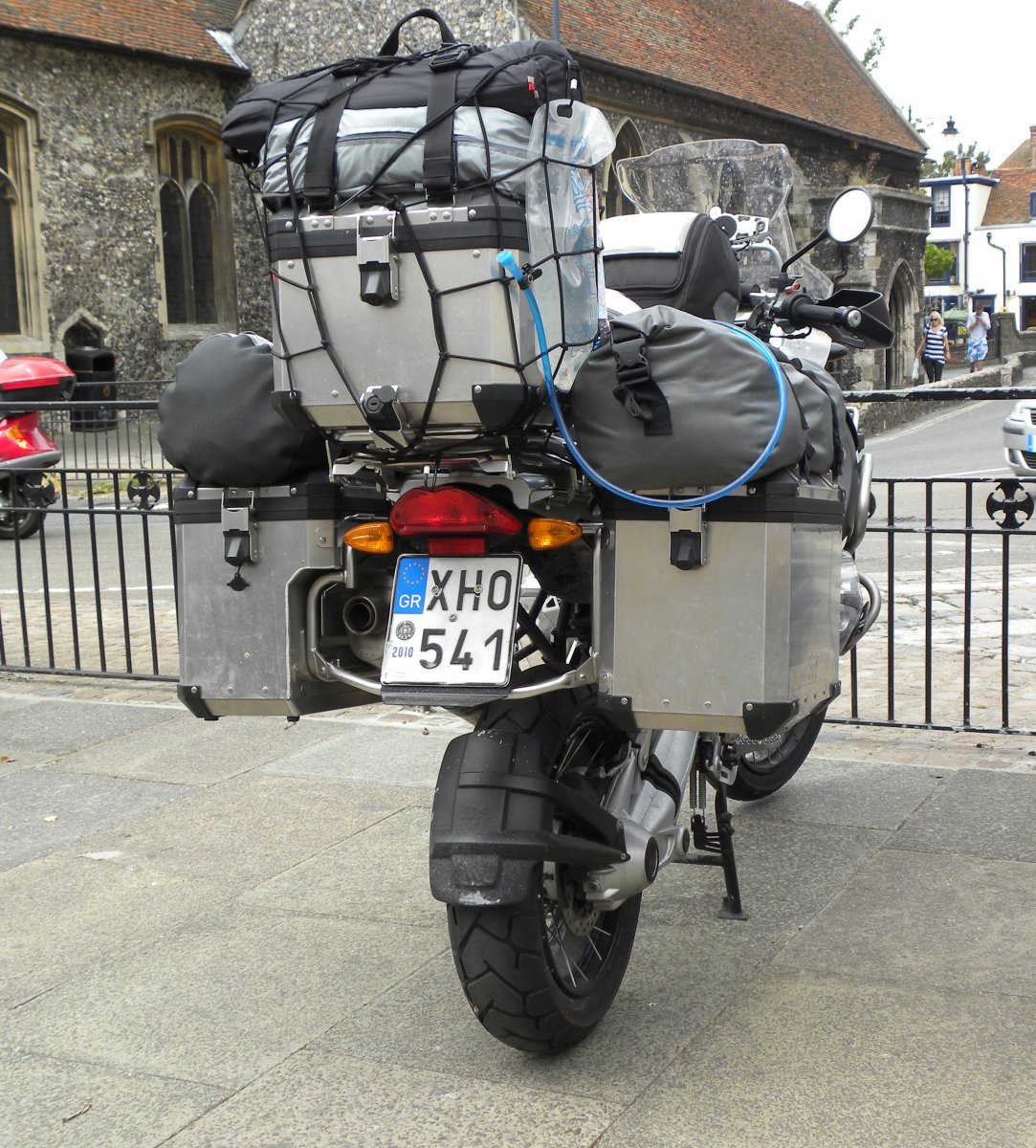
An R1200GS Adventure equipped for touring

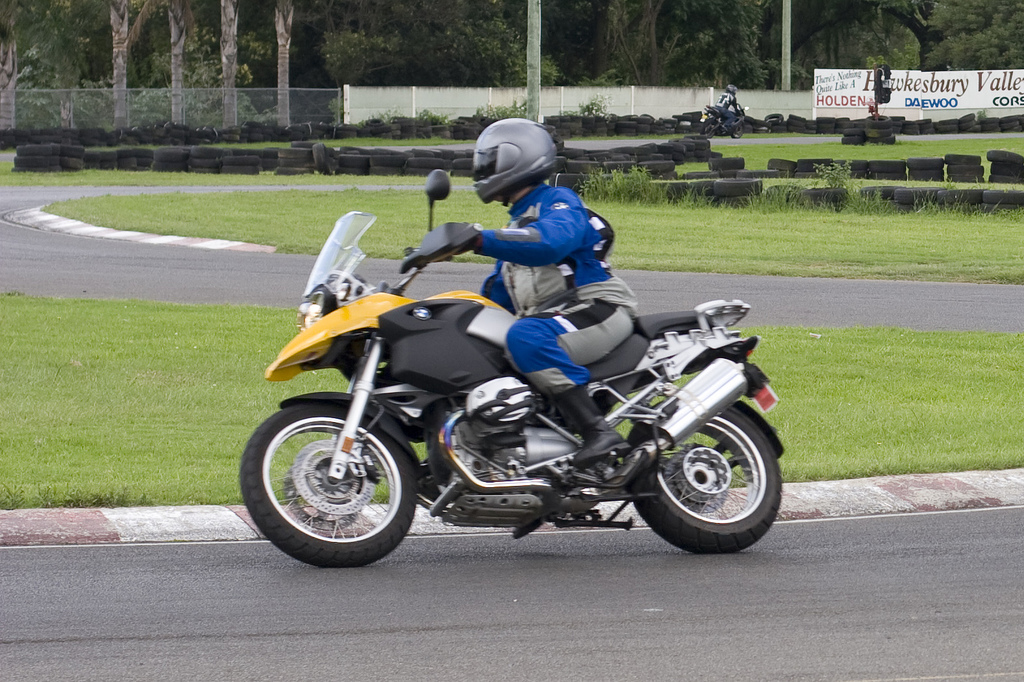
A dual-purpose bike can be used on track and off-road.

At its launch in 2004, the R1200GS was 30 kg (66 lb) lighter than the R1150GS it replaced, and produced 100 bhp (75 kW), an increase of 19%. BMW continued to produce the R1150GS Adventure, releasing a final run-out, special-edition model, before launching the R1200GS Adventure at the end of 2005, for the 2006 model year.

Upgrades for model year 2007 included increased power to 78 kW (105 bhp), a new Integral ABS II anti-lock braking system was released without servo assistance. In 2008 new options were added including electronic suspension adjustment and the Automatic Stability Control traction control system.

In 2010 model year, both models had a revised cylinder head with double overhead camshaft, an increased redline limit to 8,500 rpm, and an exhaust flap to give the exhaust a different tone. Power is increased to 82 kW (110 hp) at 7,750 rpm.

At the 2012 Intermot, BMW announced that the 2013 model would have water cooling, deliver an additional 11 kW (15 hp), and weigh about 9.1 kg (20 lb) more than the outgoing model.

Early journalistic reports described the 2013 model as having a front-end "head shake" or speed wobble, and deliveries of the motorcycle were halted while BMW revised the front-end geometry.

For the 2014 through 2016 model years, incremental annual updates were made, including adjustments to road handling, and adding options such as LED headlights, keyless ignition, a quickshifter, an anti-theft system, and another lower seat option. A new ABS mode available as a software update allows safer braking while cornering.

For the 2017 model year, the bike was given a facelift, with technical changes to meet European EU4 regulations. Side reflectors and an on-board diagnostic indicator light in the cockpit to indicate a malfunction were added. Like the R1200GS Adventure, all liquid-cooled boxer models were given a damper on the transmission output shaft. The selector drum actuator, transmission shafts, and transmission shaft bearing were revised. The GS was also given a new crash bar option, allowing cylinder protection covers to be mounted, as had been standard on the Adventure.

In 2022, BMW revealed that models of GS from 2004 onward are susceptible to shaft damage caused by water accumulation in the swingarm. Affected motorcycles will require a drain hole to be drilled in the swingarm, along with an inspection of the driveshaft, which may need to be replaced. There is no permanent solution, and periodic driveshaft inspection has been added to the maintenance schedule.

== Sales ==
In 2006, the R1200GS was the best-selling motorcycle in the United Kingdom, with combined sales of 2,227 units. The next-best-selling bike, the Honda Fireblade, sold 2,067 units.

Nearly one-third of the 100,000 units sold by BMW Motorrad worldwide in 2006 were the R1200GS.

As of 2007, the R1200GS was BMW's best-selling motorcycle, exceeding 100,000 units.

In 2008, the R1200GS was again BMW's best-selling motorcycle, with 22,845 standard models and 12,460 Adventure models delivered.

In 2012, Cycle World called the R1200GS "the most successful motorcycle in the last two-and-a-half decades" and credited it for creating the adventure touring category.

In 2016, BMW Motorrad increased sales for the sixth year in a row, with a nearly 6% growth in sales compared to 2015 according to sales figures released by the company. As of December 2016, 145,032 motorcycles and maxiscooters were sold. Sales of BMW Motorrad vehicle have grown by about 50% compared to the 98,047 vehicles sold in 2010. The R series represented 53.6% of all BMW motorcycles sold in 2016. About 17% of the bikes it sold in 2016 were the BMW R1200GS, with a growth of 7% over 2015. The R1200GS Adventure sold 21,391 units (a sales increase of 18.8%) and the R1200RT sold 9,648 units.

== In popular culture ==
In 2004, the R1150GS Adventure model of the previous series of BMW boxer-twin engined bikes was used by Ewan McGregor and Charley Boorman for an epic motorcycle road trip from London to New York City via Europe, Asia, and Alaska, and the Adventure was in the book and TV series, Long Way Round. In 2007, the same pair used R1200GS Adventure BMWs for a sequel trip from John o' Groats in Scotland to Cape Agulhas in South Africa, this project being documented in Long Way Down.

The R1200GS appeared in several episodes the BBC Two television programme The Hairy Bikers' Cookbook, ridden by chefs Dave Myers and Si King.

Noted motorcycle journalist Kevin Ash died from injuries sustained in a crash while test riding the R1200GS at its 2013 press launch. An inquest gave a finding of accidental death, but the UK coroner could not give full reasons "due to insufficient evidence".

The R1200GS is heavily featured in Neil Peart's book Roadshow: Landscape with Drums – A Concert Tour by Motorcycle, which documents his travels through America, Canada, and Europe on his R1200GS during his band Rush's 30th anniversary tour.
