= Simon and Monika Newbound =

British motorcyclists

Simon and Monika Newbound are long distance motorcyclists from the United Kingdom.

In May 2002, husband and wife Simon and Monika Newbound departed from Dublin, Ireland with the goal of riding two BMW motorcycles continuously until they had completed a total circumnavigation of the earth by the widest landmass from Sligo, Ireland to St John's, Newfoundland, Canada and exceeded the existing Guinness World Record of 99,600 kilometres (61,900 mi).

On 25 October 2004, the Newbounds completed a 101,000-kilometre (63,000 mi) full circumnavigation of the Earth. Their route went eastward from Sligo, Ireland to St. John's, Newfoundland, through 71 countries including Norway, Russia, Kazakhstan, Mongolia, Japan, Canada, and the United States. They rode their BMW F650GS and R1150GS bikes above the Arctic Circle three times on three different continents. They both rode across every state in the United States and every province in Canada, crossing North America six times. Monika and Simon rode their bikes through the Gobi, Sahara, Mojavi and Kavir deserts.

Prior to their first major journey, neither had any experience of motorcycle mechanics, and Monika had never undertaken a long distance trip before. Their World Records were achieved without any backup teams or support vehicles.

Today ^{(written April 2017)} Simon and Monika Newbound await confirmation from Guinness World Records for their second world record when they both rode more than 51000 miles continuously in the country of Iran. In October 2005, Guinness World Records formally acknowledged that the Newbounds had not only broken the existing world record, but extended it by almost 84,000 km (52,200 mi) taking the new world record to 187,000 km (116,200 mi).
