= BMW R1100RS =

Sport-touring motorcycle

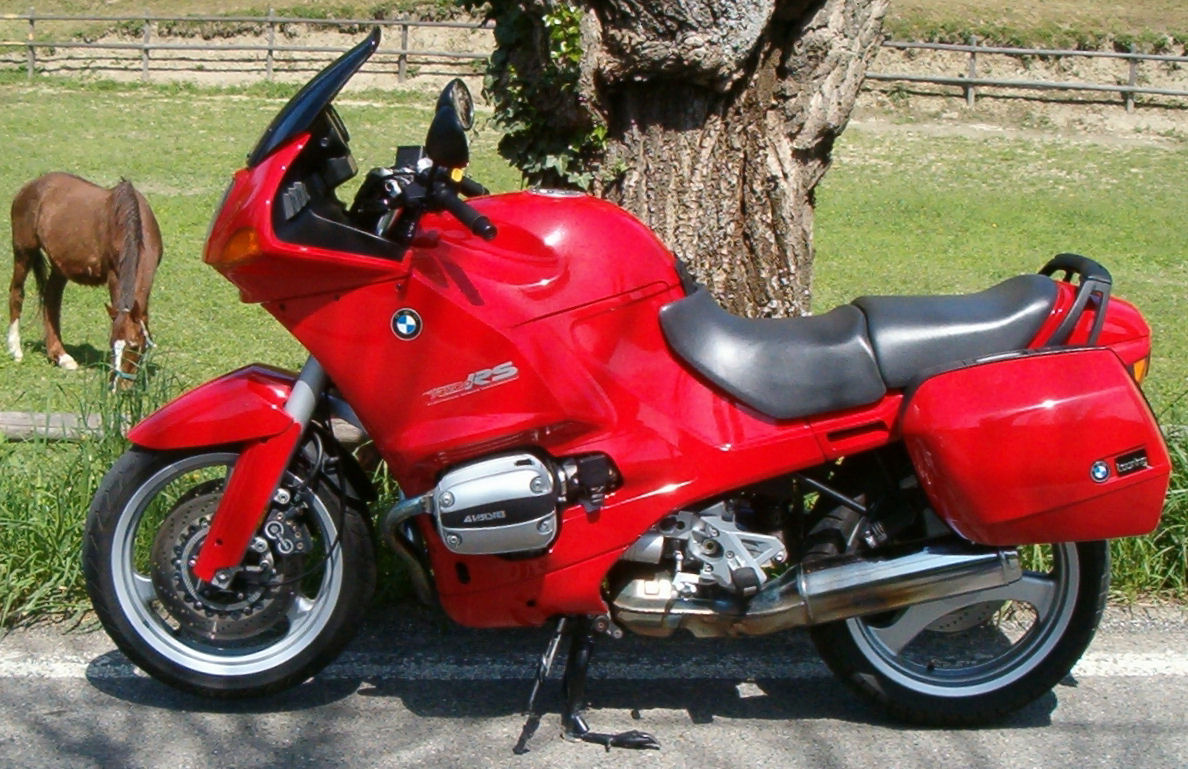
- Manufacturer: BMW Motorrad
- Production: 1993–2001
- Predecessor: BMW R100RS
- Successor: BMW R1150RS
- Class: Sport-touring or standard
- Engine: 1,085 cc, 4-valve air- and oil-cooled flat twin boxer
- Power: 90 hp (67 kW)
- Transmission: 5-speed, shaft drive, dry clutch
- Suspension: Front:Telelever; Rear: Paralever
- Brakes: Front: Dual 12 in (300 mm) disc, 4-pot caliper Rear: Single disc Optional ABS
- Tires: Front: 120/70-17; Rear: 160/60-18
- Rake, trail: 65.9°
- Wheelbase: 57.5 in (1,460 mm)
- Dimensions: L: 85.6 in (2,170 mm); W: 26.2 in (670 mm)
- Seat height: 31.5 in (800 mm)
- Weight: 527 lb (239 kg) (dry); 564 lb (256 kg) (wet)
- Fuel capacity: 6.1 US gal (23 L)

The BMW R1100RS is a sport-touring motorcycle that was manufactured by BMW Motorrad between 1993 and 2001, and was the first BMW motorcycle to use the R259 "Oilhead" boxer engine.

== Design ==
The R259 1,085 cc flat-twin engine has a maximum output of 90 horsepower (67 kW). The engine was named "Oilhead" as it had air-cooled cylinders but oil-cooled heads.

The BMW R1100RS used a frameless design, using the engine as a stressed member, an approach used by BMW for all subsequent oilheads (except the R1100S). Instead of having conventional telescopic forks, the R1100RS used BMW's own Telelever suspension which bolted directly to the engine. The Telelever design has a superficially similar appearance to telescopic forks, but braking forces are taken back horizontally, minimising "fork dive". A rear subframe supported the rider, passenger and luggage. Both fully-faired and half-faired variants were available.

In 1993 the engine was adopted for the R1100GS. In 1999, a more powerful six-speed version of the R259 engine was fitted in the BMW R1100S. In 2013 BMW introduced liquid-cooling for their flat-twin motorcycle engines, but the company still fit oilhead boxer engines to roadsters such as the R nineT.

== Awards ==
The R1100RS was marketed in the United States from 1994, when it was chosen as Cycle World's best standard motorcycle of 1994.
