= BMW HP2 Sport =

BMW sports motorcycle

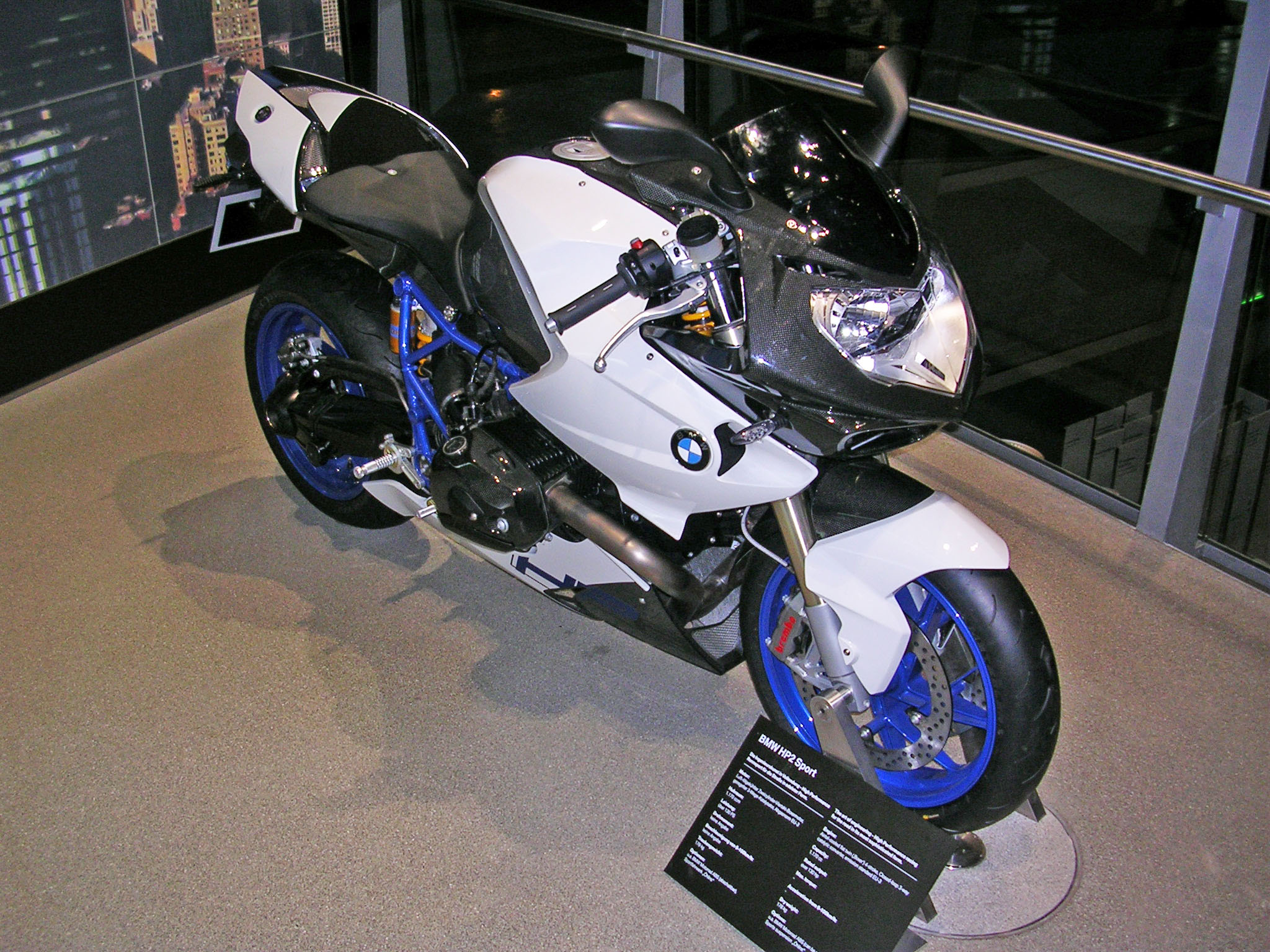
- Manufacturer: BMW Motorrad
- Production: 2008 - 2010
- Predecessor: R1200S
- Successor: HP4
- Engine: 1170 cc flat twin
- Bore / stroke: 101 mm × 73 mm (4.0 in × 2.9 in)
- Compression ratio: 12.5:1
- Power: 99 kW (133 hp) @ 8,750 rpm
- Torque: 85 lbf⋅ft (115 N⋅m) @ 6,000 rpm
- Ignition type: Digital CDI
- Transmission: Single-plate dry clutch, 6-speed, shaft drive
- Frame type: Tubular steel Trellis with carbon-fibre rear subframe
- Suspension: Öhlins, Front: BMW Telelever; Rear: BMW Paralever
- Dimensions: L: 2,151 mm (84.7 in); H: 1,177 mm (46.3 in)
- Weight: 399 lb (181 kg) (claimed) (dry); 199 kg (439 lb) (wet)
- Fuel capacity: 16 L; 3.5 imp gal (4.2 US gal)
- Related: BMW HP2 Enduro

The BMW HP2 Sport is a boxer-engined sports motorcycle produced by BMW Motorrad from 2008 to 2010. It is the successor to the BMW R1200S.

== Design ==
The engine is a 1,170 cc flat-twin "oilhead" with air-cooled cylinders and oil-cooled heads. Derived from the engine of the BMW R1200S, the DOHC eight-valve fuel-injected engine is tuned for a maximum output of 133 horsepower (99 kW) at 8,750rpm. The HP2's engine was the most powerful "oilhead" motor before BMW introduced liquid cooling for some of its flat twins in 2013.

At 178kg (dry) and 133hp, the HP2 Sport is lighter and more powerful than the R1200S on which it is based. Its frame is tubular steel, like that of the R1200S, but the latter's tubular rear subframe is discarded in favour of a lightweight self-supporting carbon fibre semi-monococque seat unit.

The HP2 Sport is fitted as standard with a quick shifter, Öhlins suspension and many carbon fibre body parts. Front brake calipers are Brembo "race-spec" Monobloc, wheels are lightweight forged aluminium, and original equipment tyres are Metzeler race compound items.

== Reception ==
The HP2 Sport was well received. Motor Cycle News declared it to be BMW's "finest sporting package ", adding, "it is a lot of bike with a serious amount of performance goodies ... Not only does it make a brilliant road-going bike, the BMW HP2 will cut up rough at track days."

== Range ==
BMW produced two other different HP2 machines, the HP2 Megamoto of 2007–2010, and the HP2 off-road machine of 2005–2008, neither of which were as well received as the HP2 Sport, however they have quickly become collector machines commanding high prices on the used market.
