= History of BMW motorcycles =

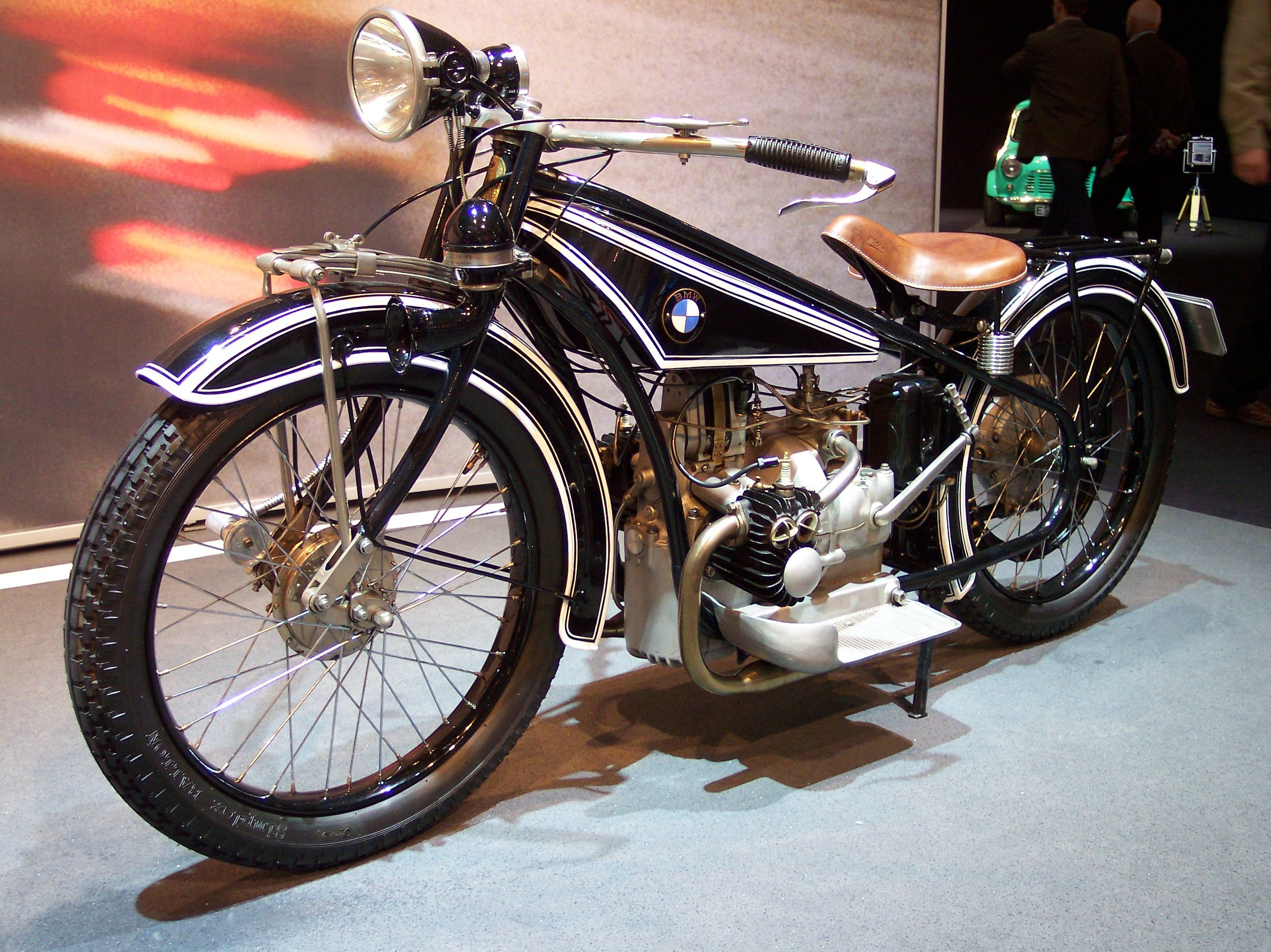
BMW R 32 (1923–1926)

BMW's motorcycle history began in 1921 when the company commenced manufacturing engines for other companies. BMW's own motorcycles—sold under the BMW Motorrad brand—began in 1923 with the BMW R 32, which was powered by a flat-twin engine (also called a "boxer-twin" engine). Production of motorcycles with flat-twin engines continues to this day, however BMW has also produced many models with other types of engines.

== Motorcycle history ==
=== 1921–1938 ===
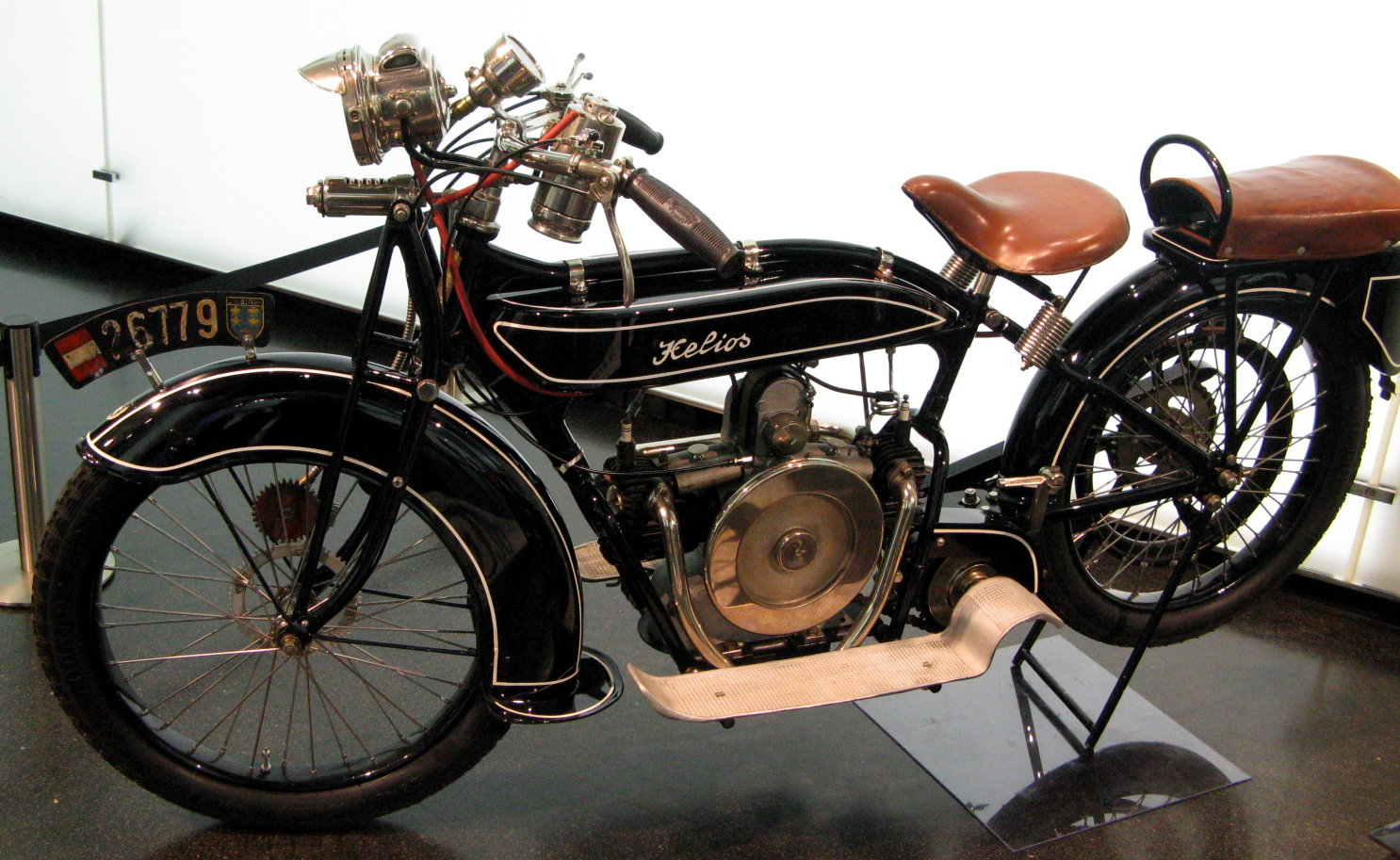
BFw Helios (1920–1923)

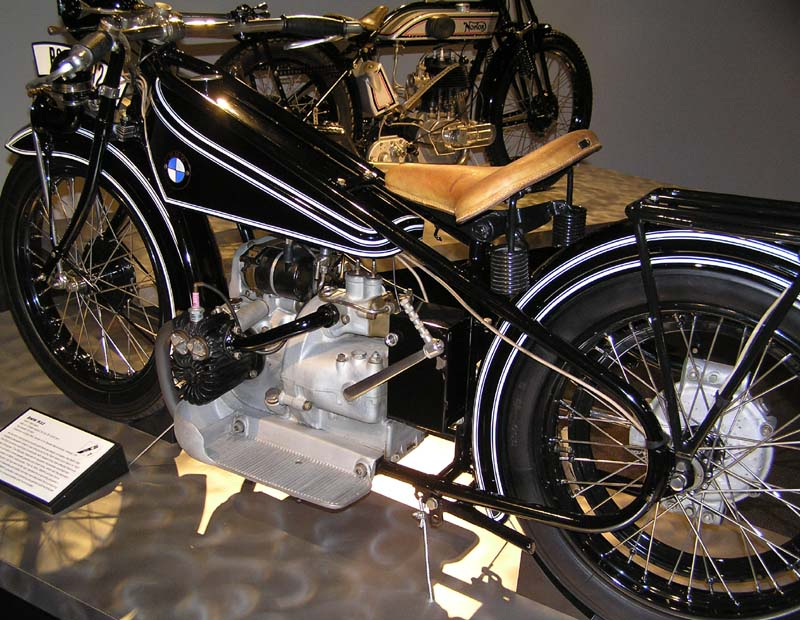
BMW R 32 (1923–1926)

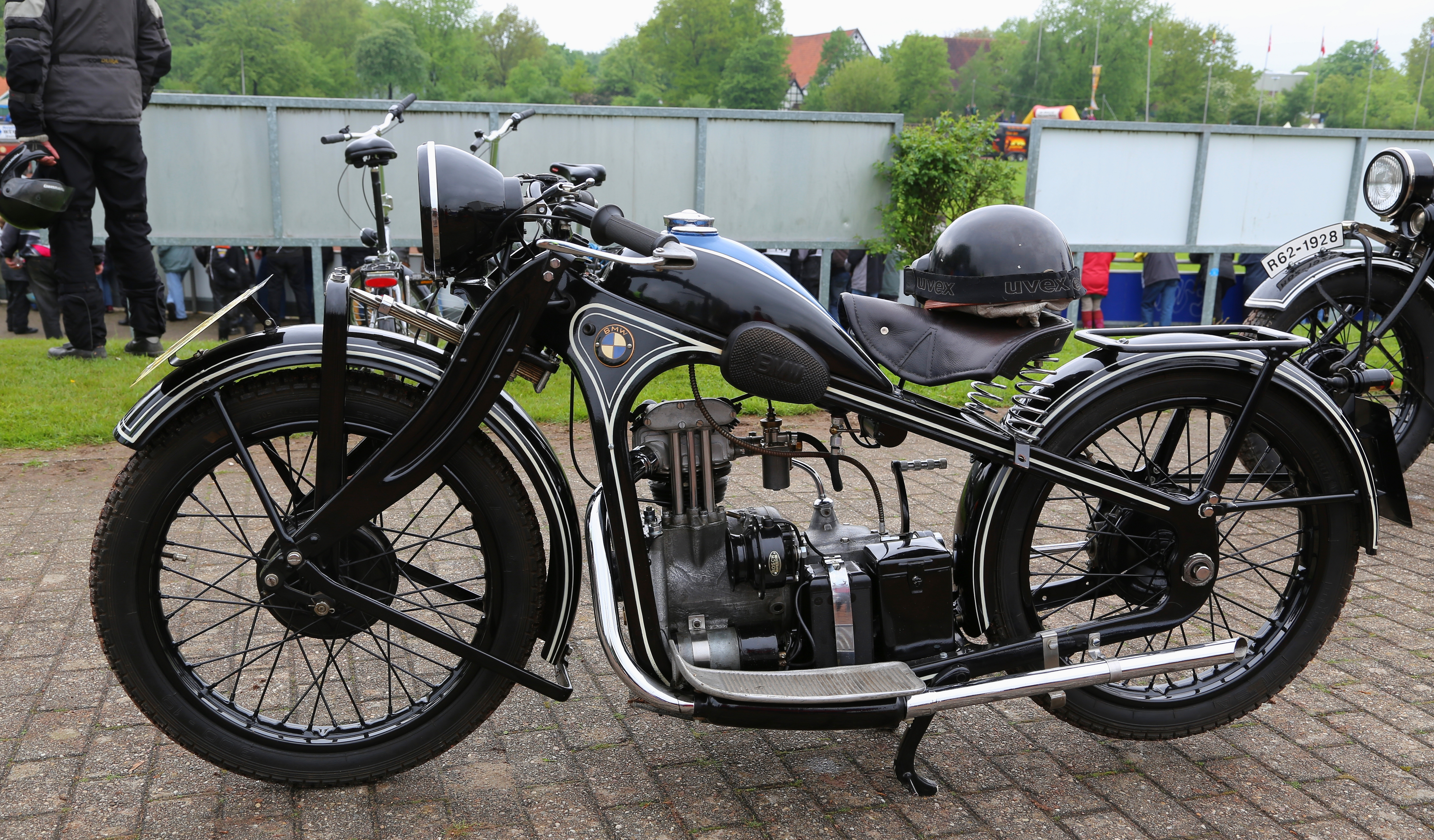
BMW R 2 (1931–1936)

At the end of World War I, the Treaty of Versailles demanded that BMW cease production of aircraft engines. To remain in business, the company began producing small industrial engines (along with farm equipment, household items and railway brakes). In 1920, BMW M2B15 flat-twin petrol engine was released. Despite being designed as a portable industrial engine, the M2B15 was also used by several motorcycle manufacturers, including for the 1920–1923 Victoria KR1 and the 1920–1922 Bayerische Flugzeugwerke (BFw) Helios motorcycles.

BMW merged with Bayerische Flugzeugwerke in 1922, and the BFw Helios became the starting point for the first BMW motorcycle. Released in 1923, the BMW R 32 used a 486 cc (29.7 cu in) flat-twin petrol engine, which was longitudinally-mounted to eliminate the cooling problems of the transversely mounted engine in the Helios. This engine with 6.3 kW (8.5 hp), resulting in a top speed of 95 to 100 km/h (59 to 62 mph). At a time when many motorcycle manufacturers used total-loss oiling systems, the new BMW engine featured a recirculating wet sump oiling system with a drip feed to roller bearings; a design which BMW used until 1969. The R 32 also started the tradition of shaft drive, which was used on all BMW motorcycles until 1994.

The BMW R 37, produced from 1925 to 1926, was BMW's first sporting model. It was based on the R 32 and used an overhead valve engine producing 12 kW (16 hp).

The first single-cylinder BMW motorcycle was the 1925 BMW R 39, which was BMW's smallest model and used a 250 cc (15.3 cu in) engine. It was not successful and was discontinued in 1927. The next single-cylinder motorcycle was the BMW R 2, which was released in 1931. It used a 200 cc (12.2 cu in) engine and could therefore be ridden in Germany without a motorcycle licence at that time. The lineage of single-cylinder motorcycles continued with the 400 cc (24.4 cu in) BMW R 4 in 1932 and the 300 cc (18.3 cu in) BMW R 3 in 1936.

The BMW R 11, introduced in 1930, was the first touring motorcycle in the 750cc class manufactured by BMW with a pressed-steel frame.

The BMW R 12 and BMW R 17, both introduced in 1935, were the first production motorcycles with hydraulically damped telescopic forks.

In 1937, Ernst Henne recorded a top speed of 279.5 km/h (173.7 mph) on a BMW 500 Kompressor racing motorcycle, setting a world record that stood for 14 years.

The BMW R 71 746 cc (45.5 cu in) big flat-twin motorcycle was exceptional. It was the Icon of BMW, well engineered but expensive to build. Unfortunately only 2,638 motorcycles could be built before production was disrupted due to the War. Original bikes are now rare and highly sought after. Around 500 are known to survive today. It was either licensed to the Soviet Union in 1938 or just copied there, resulting in the Dnepr M-72 (produced from 1942 to 1960) and IMZ-Ural (modernised version still in production) motorbikes .

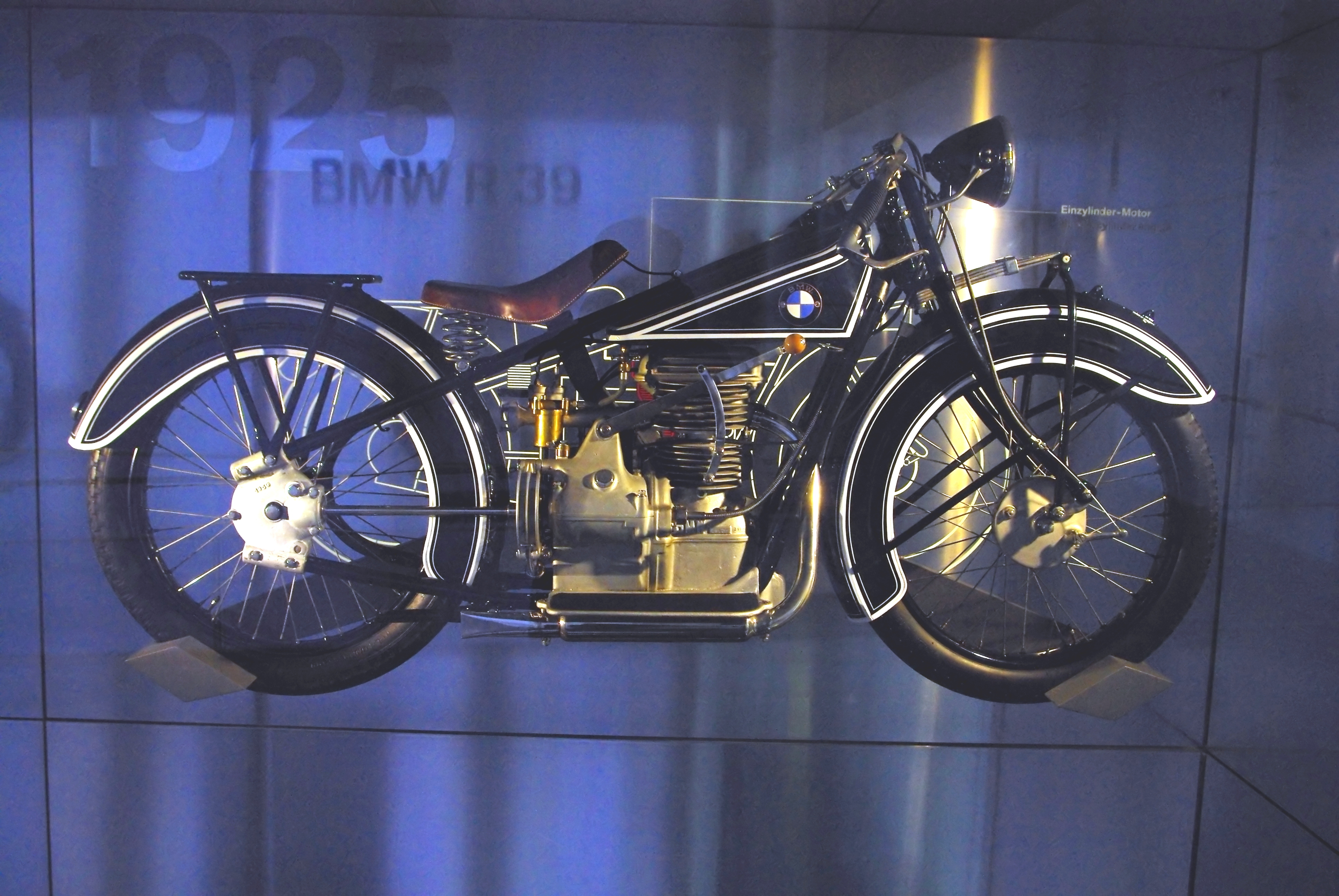
BMW R 39 (1925–1927)

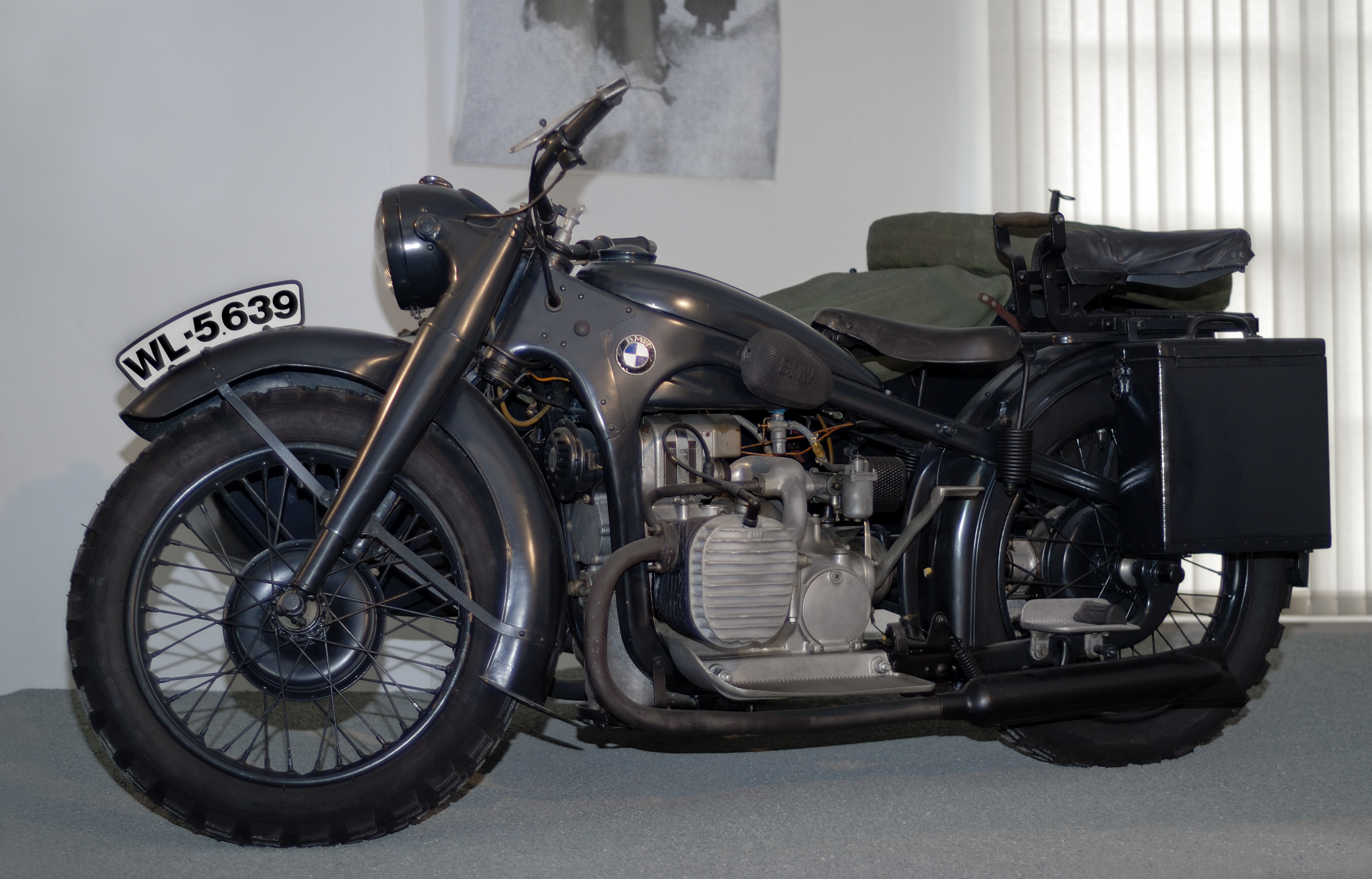
BMW R 12 (1935–1942)

=== 1939–1945 ===
During World War II, the German military needed as many vehicles as it could get of all types and many other German companies were asked to build motorcycles. The BMW R 75 performed particularly well in the harsh operating environment of North Africa, partly due to the protruding cylinders of the flat-twin engine providing more effective cooling than other configurations which overheated in the sun. Shaft drives also performed better than chain-drives which were damaged by desert grit. The R 75 inspired similar models from U.S. manufacturers, such as the Indian 841 and Harley-Davidson XA.

=== 1945–1955 ===
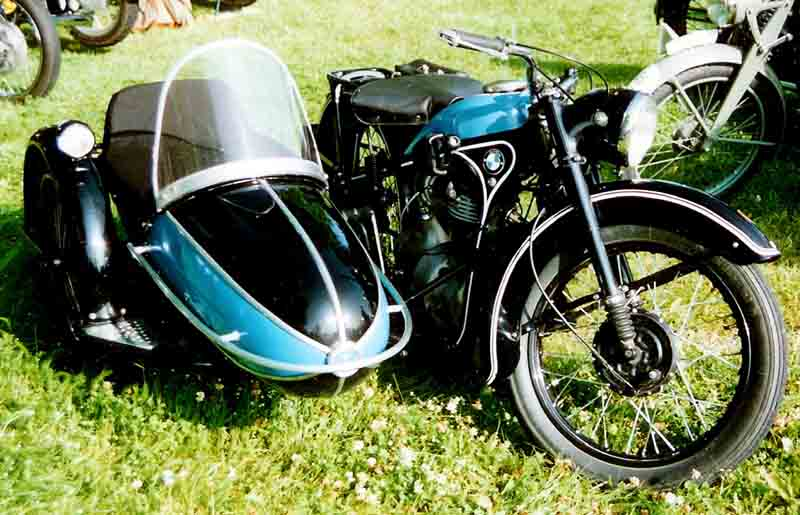
East German-built BMW R 35 (1945–1955)

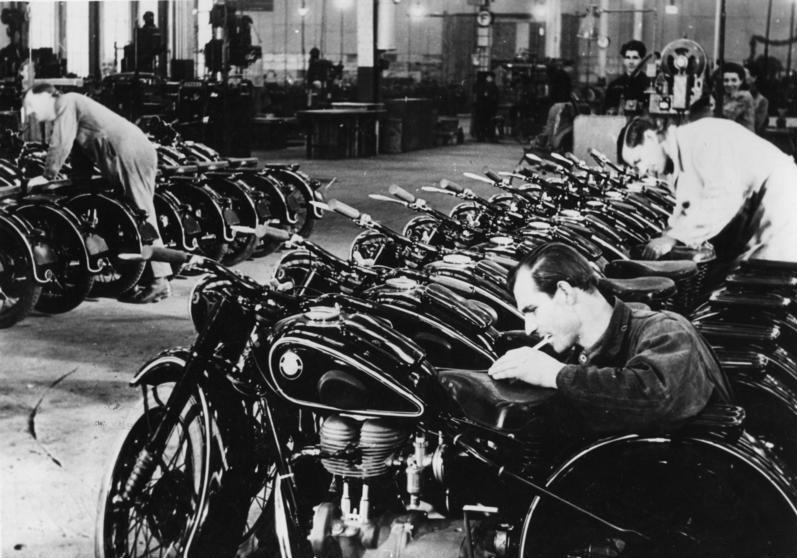
BMW R 24 (1948–1950)

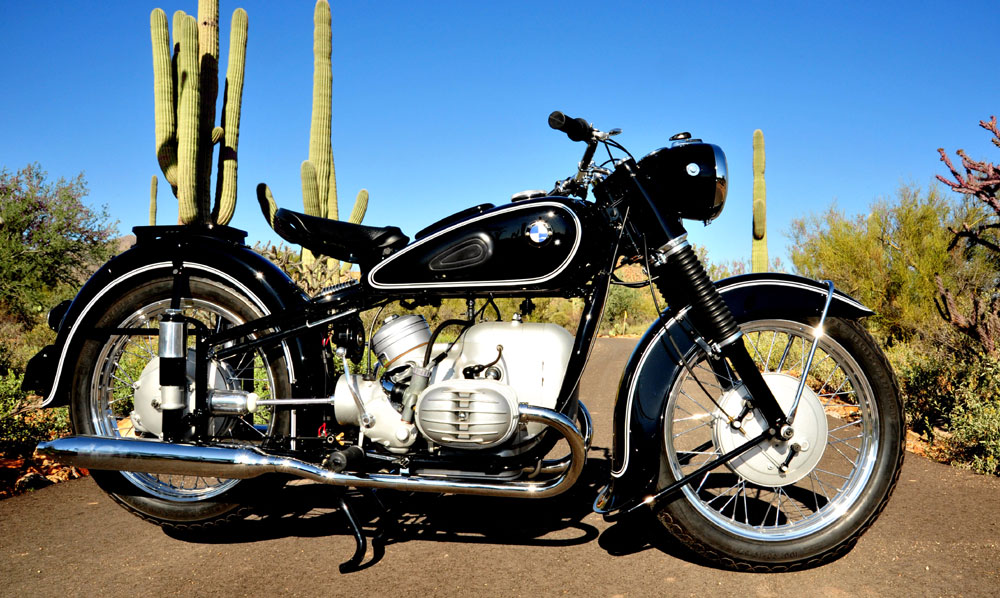
BMW R 51/3 (1951–1954)

In Soviet-controlled East Germany, BMW's sole motorcycle plant in Eisenach recommenced production of R35 and R75 motorcycles soon after the war, for reparations. The factory continued to use the BMW name, causing two separate companies (one in Eisenach and the other in Munich, West Germany) to be using the BMW name between 1948 and 1952. The head office of BMW, based in Munich, had no control over the operations in East Germany. Eventually in 1952, after the Soviets ceded control of the plant to the East German Government, and following a trademark lawsuit, the East German company was renamed Eisenacher Motorenwerk (EMW). Instead of BMW's blue-and-white roundel, EMW used a very similar red-and-white roundel as its logo.

In West Germany, many of BMWs facilities had been badly damaged during the war, including the Munich factory which was in ruins. Initially, the terms of Germany's surrender forbade BMW from manufacturing motorcycles. In 1947, when BMW received permission to restart motorcycle production from US authorities in Bavaria, BMW had to start from scratch. There were no plans, blueprints, or schematic drawings because they were all in Eisenach. The first post-war BMW motorcycle in Western Germany, was the 1948 BMW R 24. The R 24 was reverse-engineered from the pre-war BMW R 23 motorcycle with several improvements and powered by a 247 cc (15 cu in) single-cylinder engine. It was the only postwar West German model without rear suspension. In 1949, BMW produced 9,200 units and by 1950 production surpassed 17,000 units.

Production of flat-twin models resumed in 1950 with the 500 cc (31 cu in) R 51/2 model, which was followed by the BMW R 51/3 and BMW R 67 twins in 1951, and the sporting 26 kW (35 hp) BMW R 68 in 1952. Except for the R 68, all flat-twin models came with "bell-bottom" front fenders and front stands.

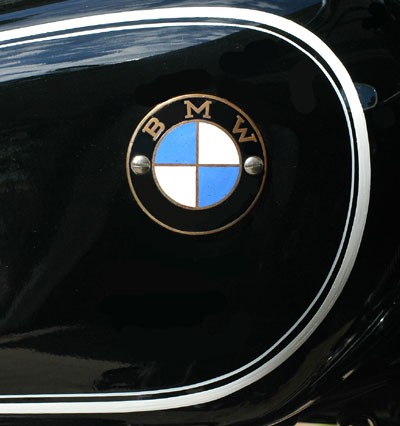
BMW emblem on a BMW R 51 (1938–1940)

=== 1955–1969 ===
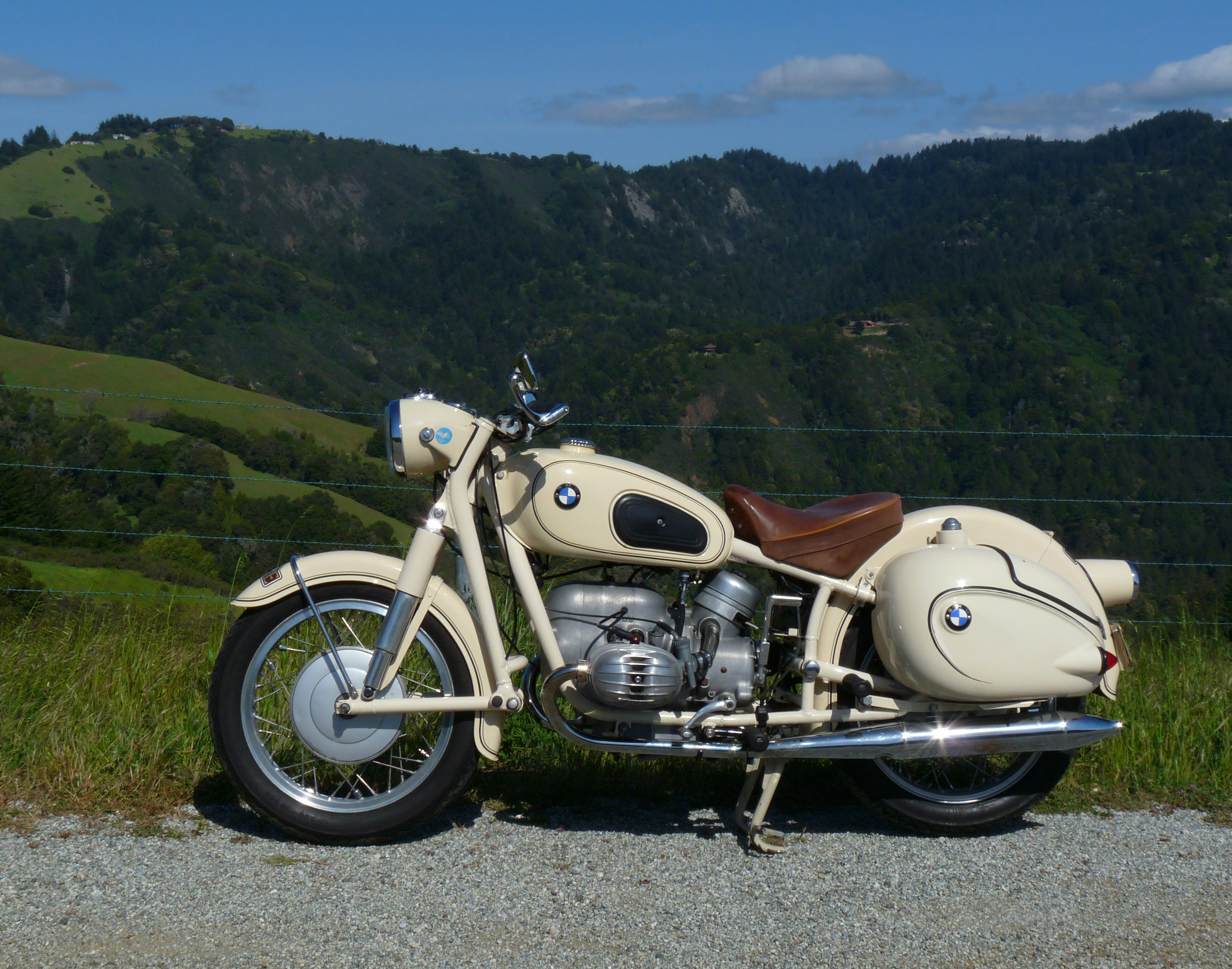
BMW R 50 (1955–1960)

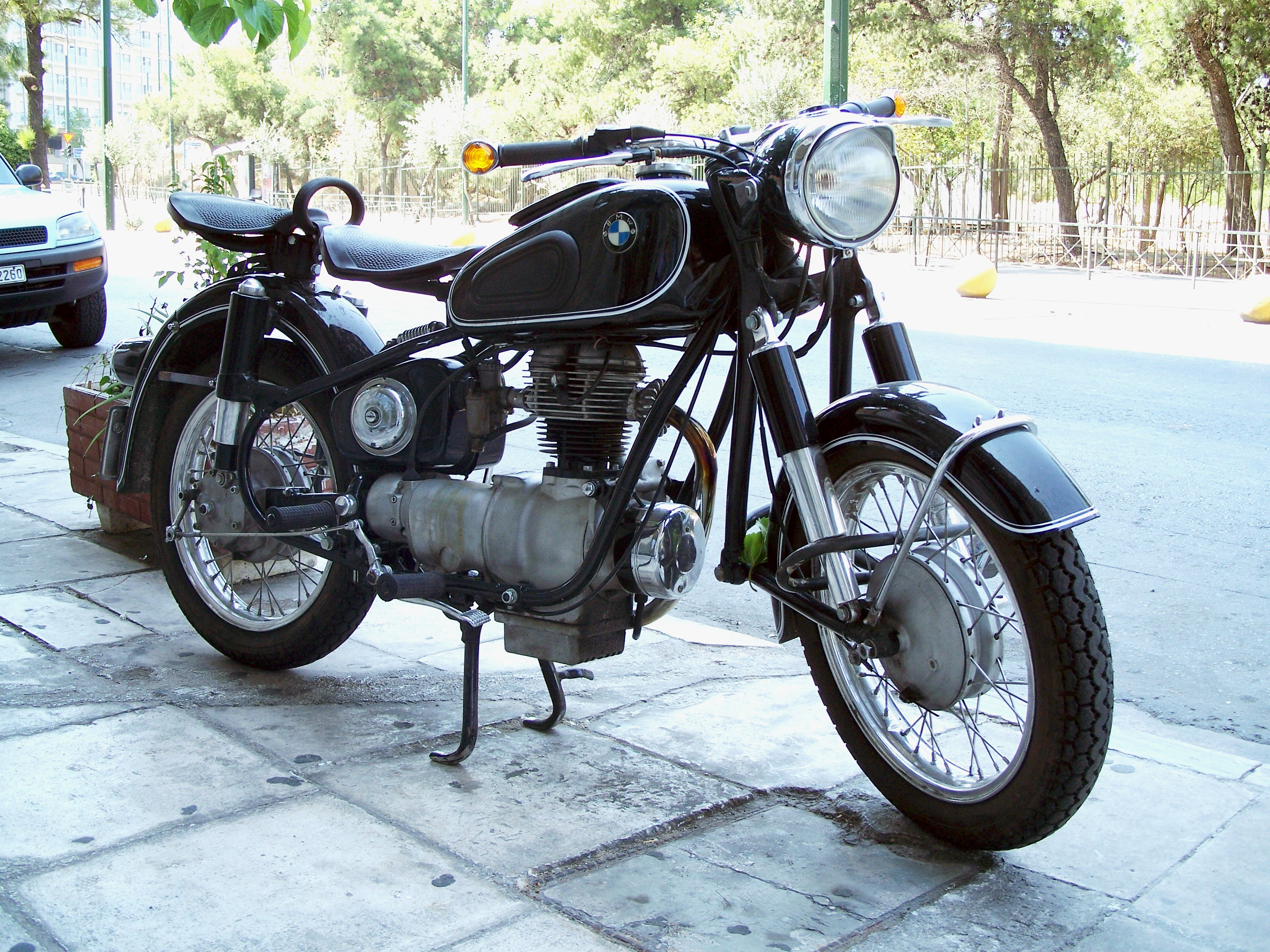
BMW R 27 (1960–1966)

Motorcycle sales in Europe plummeted as the 1950s progressed, with three of BMW's major German competitors going out of business in 1967. In 1954, BMW produced 30,000 motorcycles. By 1957, that number was less than 5,500.

In 1955, BMW began introducing a new range of motorcycles with Earles forks and enclosed drive shafts. These were the 19 kW (26 hp) BMW R 50, the 22 kW (30 hp) BMW R 60 and the sporting model BMW R 69 with 35 hp (26 kW). On June 8, 1959, John Penton rode a BMW R 69 from New York to Los Angeles in 53 hours and 11 minutes, slashing over 24 hours from the previous record.

By the late 1950s, the overall BMW company was in financial trouble. The company narrowly avoided a merger with Daimler-Benz through the combination of financing from brothers Herbert Quandt and Harald Quandt, increased success of the automobile division and the selling off of its aircraft engine division. Changes in the motorcycle market saw BMW's last shaft-driven single-cylinder model, the BMW R 27, end production in 1967. Also, most of BMW's offerings were still designed to be used with sidecars. However, by the late 1960s, sidecars were no longer a consideration of most riders; people were interested in sportier motorcycles instead. The BMW R 50/2, R 60/2, and R 69 S were the last sidecar-capable BMWs, with the latter being the most powerful and desirable model.

In the United States, sales of motorcycles were strong through the 1950s, in contrast to drastically declining sales in Europe. Later, specific "US" models were sold in the United States for the 1968 and 1969 model years: the BMW R 50 US, R 60 US and the R 69 US. These models were sold with telescopic forks (alongside other BMW models which were sold with Earles forks) and without sidecar lugs.

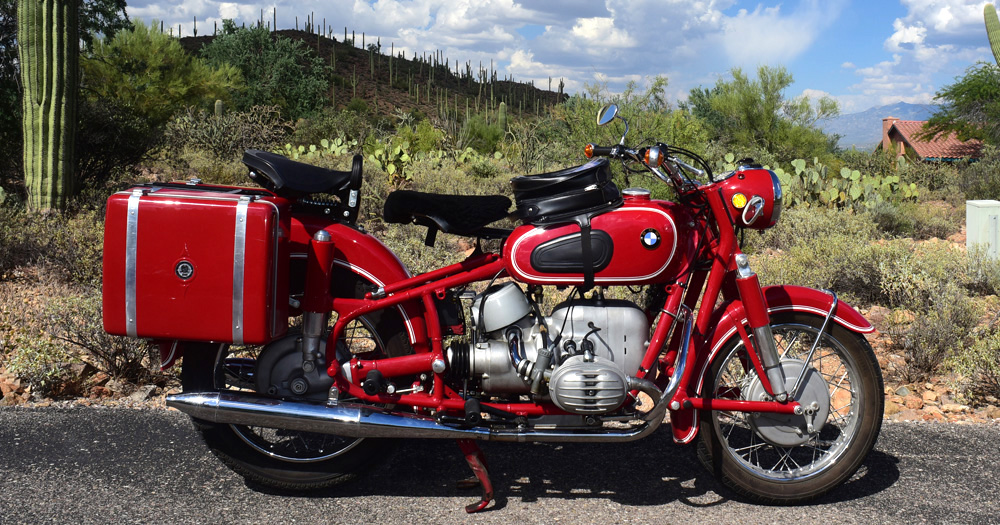
BMW R 60/2 (1960–1969)

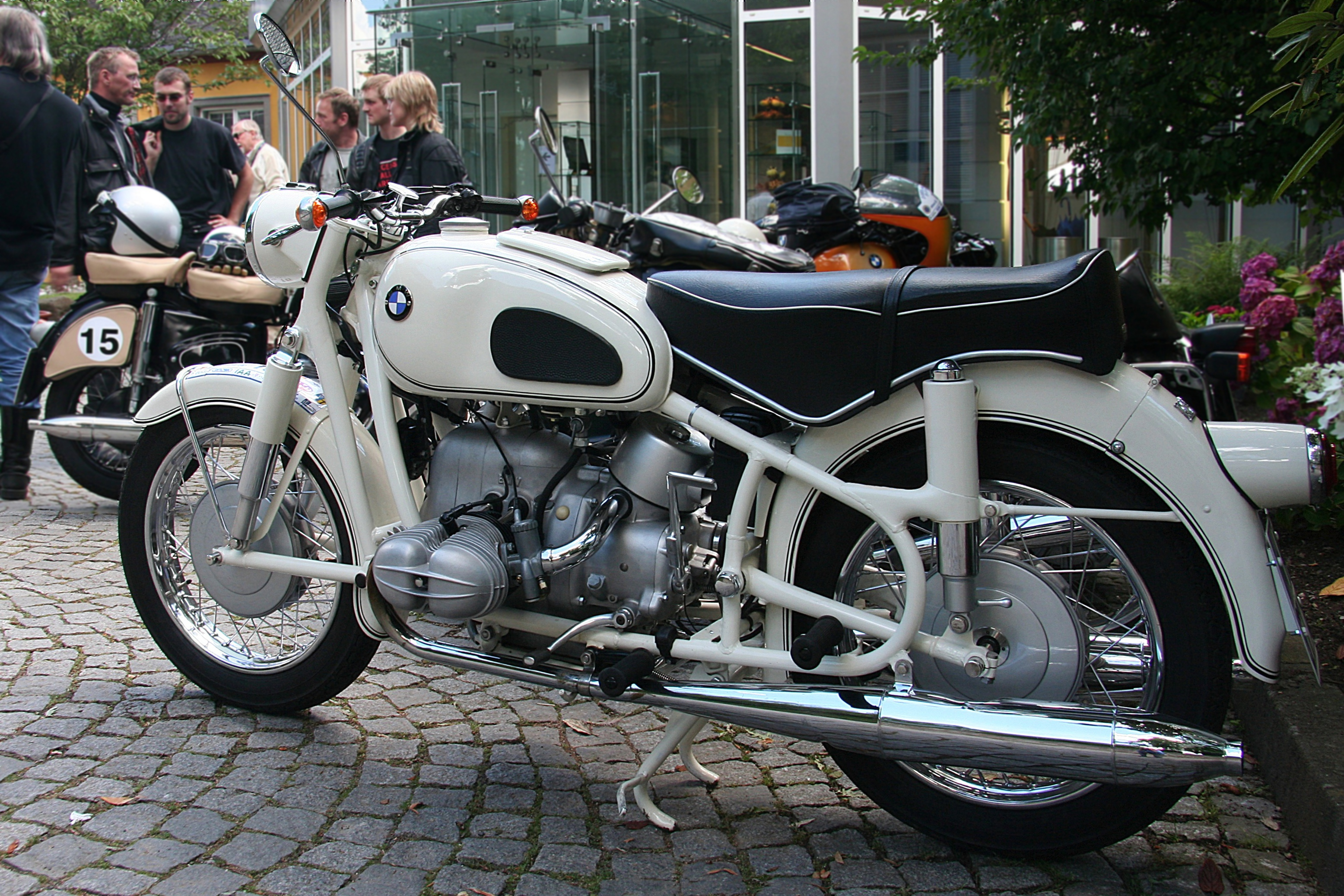
BMW R 69 S (1960–1969)

=== 1969–1982 ===
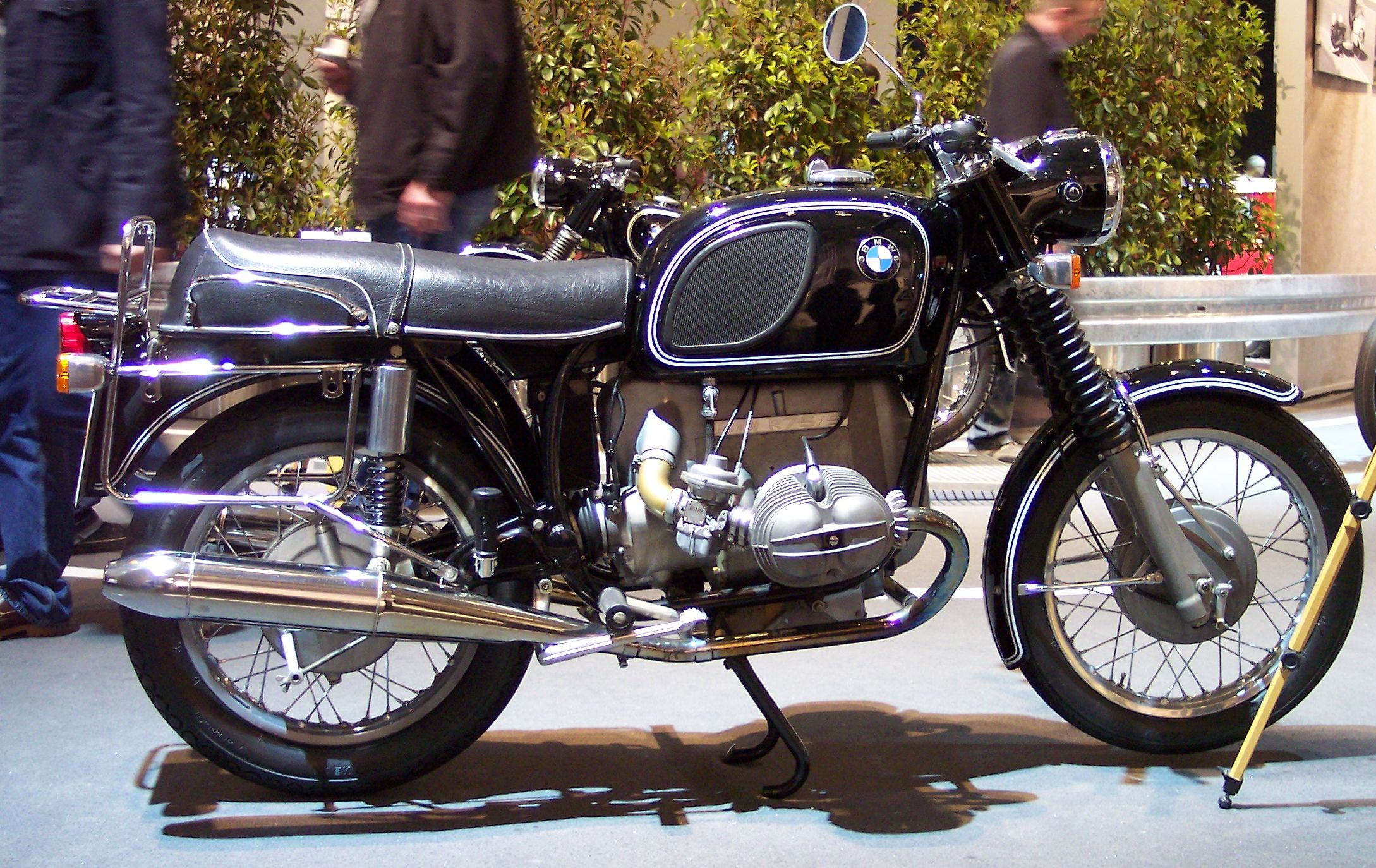
BMW R75/5 (1969–1973)

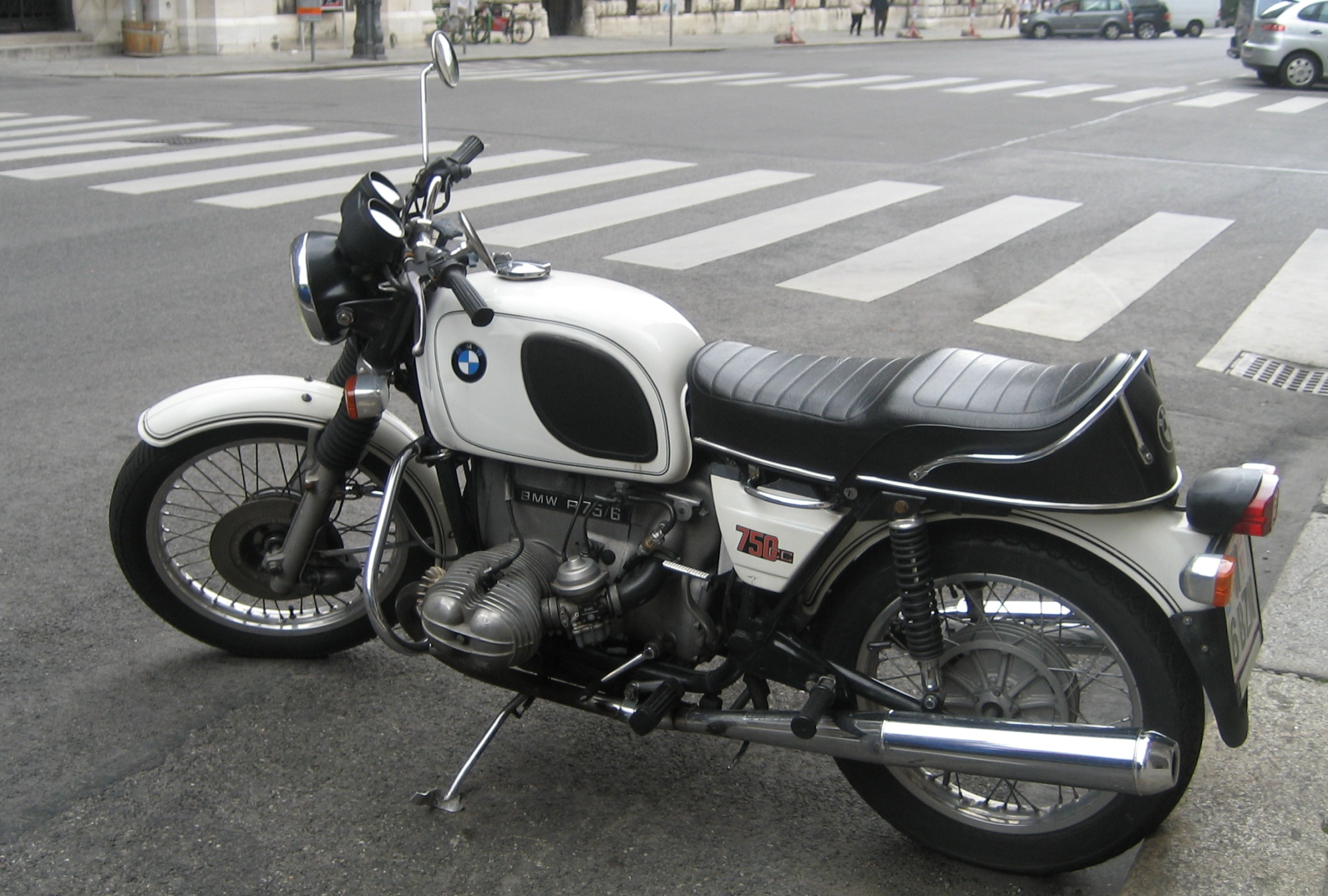
BMW R75/6 (1973–1976)

The model range was entirely revamped in 1969 with the introduction of the BMW /5 range, consisting of the 500 cc BMW R 50/5, the 600 cc BMW R 60/5 and the 750 cc BMW R 75/5 models. The engines were a complete redesign, with the crankshaft bearings upgraded from roller bearings to shell-type journal bearings (the type used in modern car engines). The camshaft was now chain-driven and located underneath the crankshaft instead of at the top of the engine, in order to lower the centre of gravity. An electric starter was available for the first time, although the traditional gearbox-mounted kick starter was also retained. The styling of the first models included chrome-plated side panels and a restyled tank. In 1973, the rear swingarm was lengthened, which improved the handling and allowed a larger battery to be installed.

The introduction of the "/5" models coincided with production relocating from Munich to a new factory in Spandau, West Berlin. at a site earlier occupied by a Siemens aircraft engine factory.

The BMW /6 range replaced the "/5" models in 1974, with the 500 cc (31 cu in) engine being discontinued and a 900 cc (55 cu in) engine introduced. The "/6" model range consisted of the 600 cc BMW R 60/6, the 750 cc BMW R 75/6, the 900 cc BMW R 90/6 and the sporting 900 cc BMW R 90 S. Other upgrades included a five-speed gearbox, brakes and the electrical system. In 1975, the kick starter was finally eliminated.

In 1976, the BMW /7 range replaced the "/6" models. The 800 cc BMW R 80/7 model was introduced, and the 900 cc BMW R 90/6 and BMW R 90S models were replaced by the 1,000 cc BMW R 100/7, BMW R 100S and BMW R 100RS models. The latter was a full-fairing design which produced 51 kW (68 hp) and had a top speed of 200 km/h (124 mph). Later variants of the 1,000 cc models included the BMW R 100T ("Touring"), the BMW R 100 RT and BMW R 100CS ("Classic Sport").

The 1978 BMW R 45 and BMW R 65 were entry-level 450 cc and 650 cc models that replaced the BMW R 60/7. Later variants of the BMW R 65 included the 1982 BMW R65 LS, the sporting BMW R 65 S and the 1987 dual-sport BMW R 65 GS.

=== 1983–1992 ===
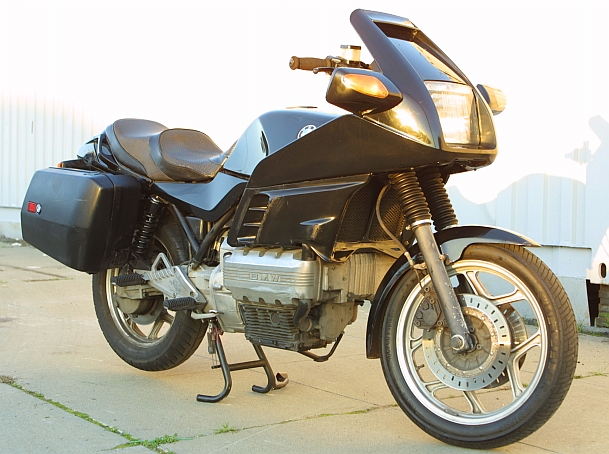
BMW K 100 RS (1983–1993)

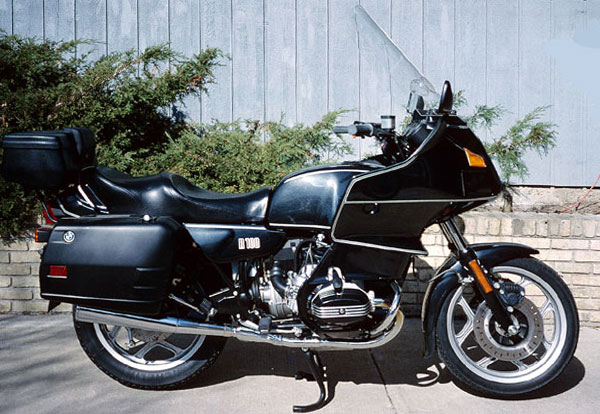
BMW R 100 RT (1978–1996)

The BMW K 100, introduced in 1983, marked a departure from BMW's tradition of air-cooled flat-twin engines. It was powered by a water-cooled inline-four engine with a displacement of 987 cc (60 cu in), which was also BMW's first fuel-injected motorcycle engine. The frame was tubular steel and the rear suspension was a single-sided swingarm.

In 1985, the BMW K 75 was added as the entry-level model. The K 75 was powered by a 750 cc inline-three engine, which was BMW's first engine to use a counterbalance shaft. In 1988, the K 100 became the first motorcycle to have anti-lock brakes (ABS) and in 1989 the K 100 RS 4V model became the first BMW motorcycle to use an engine with four valves per cylinder.

The 1988 BMW K 1 sports tourer was BMW's first full-fairing sport bike. It had an aerodynamic body which was designed to minimise drag at high speeds.

Production of flat-twin touring models continued with the BMW R 100 and BMW R 80 model ranges.

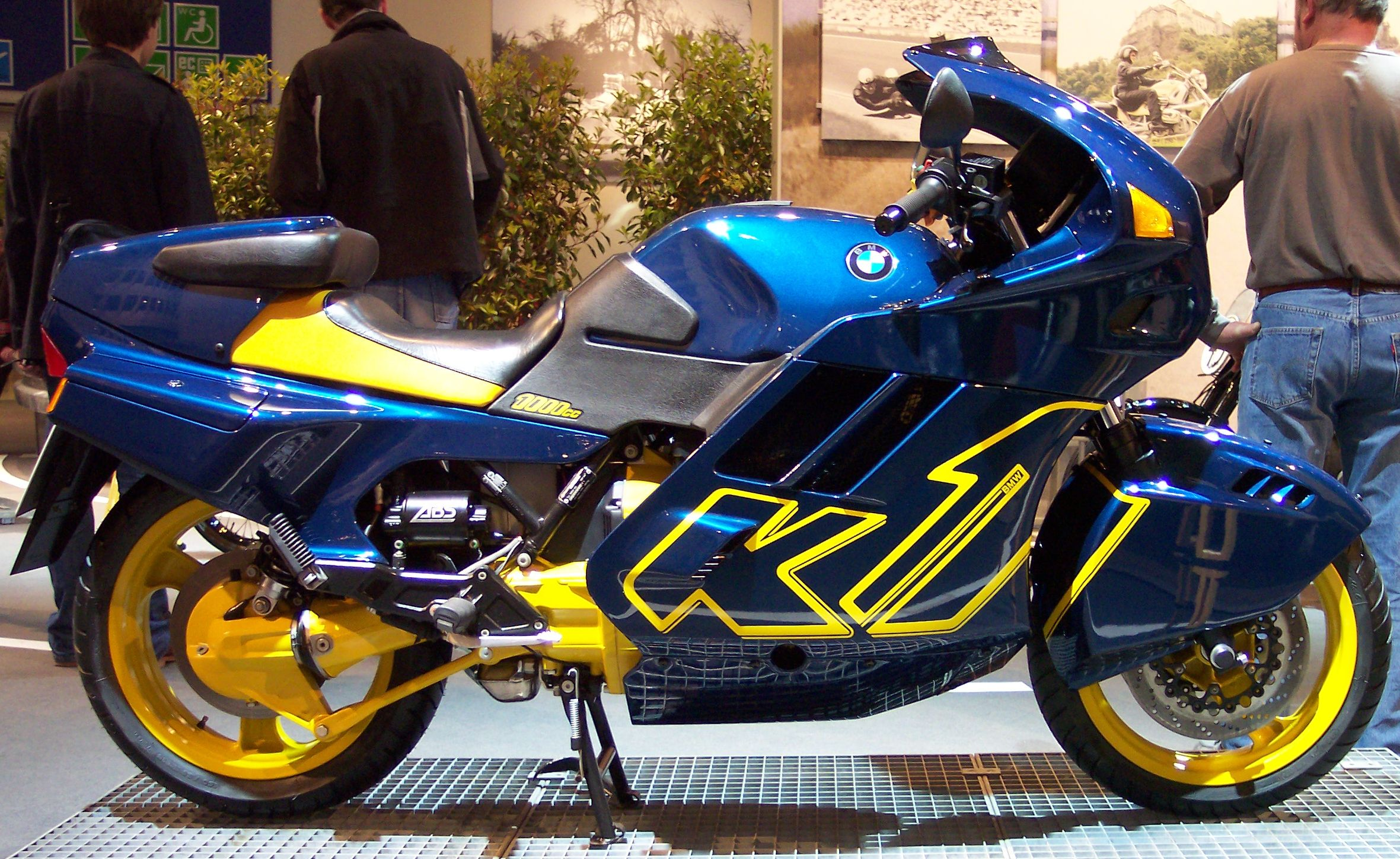
BMW K 1 (1988–1993)

=== 1993–2003 ===
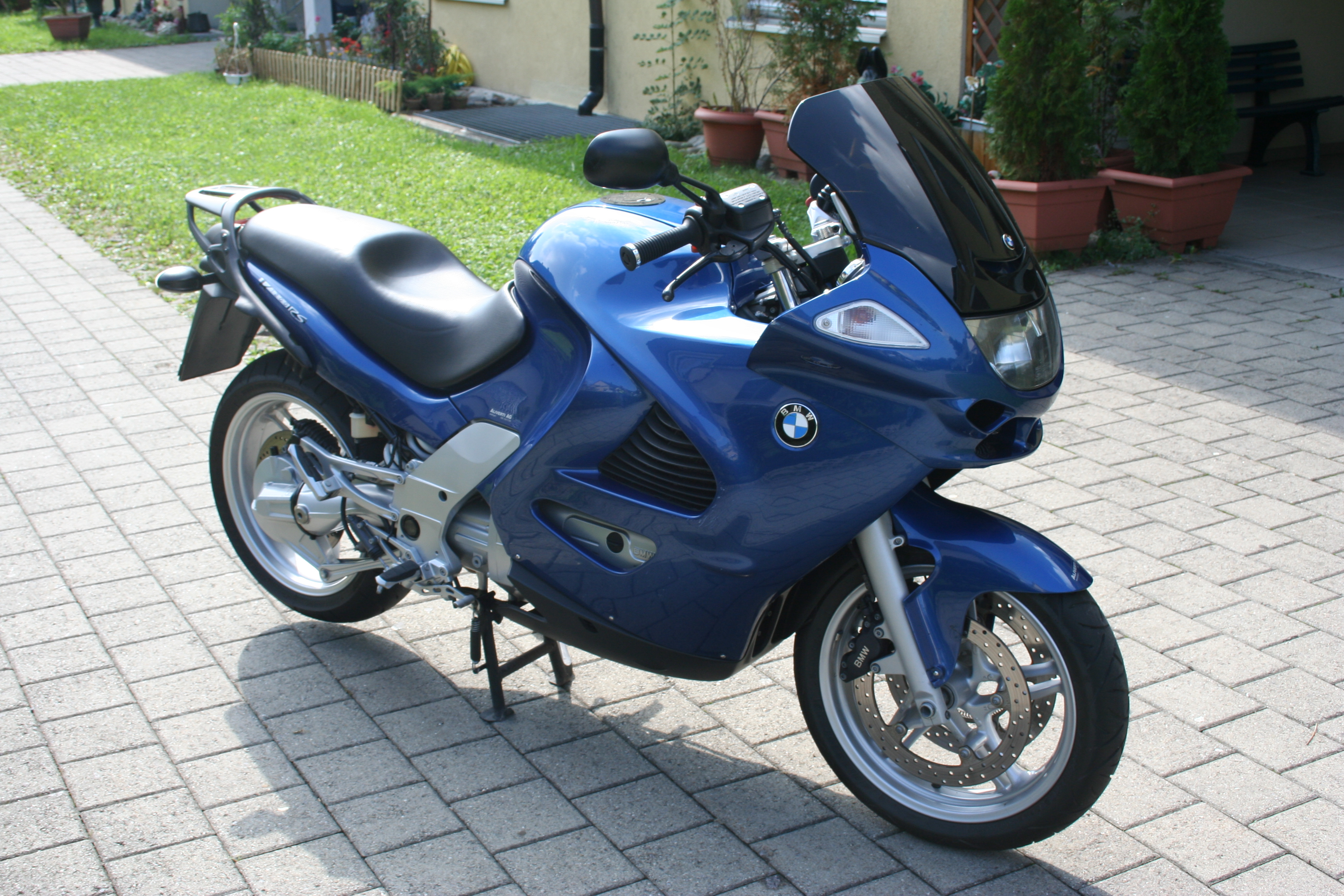
BMW K 1200 RS (1996–2004)

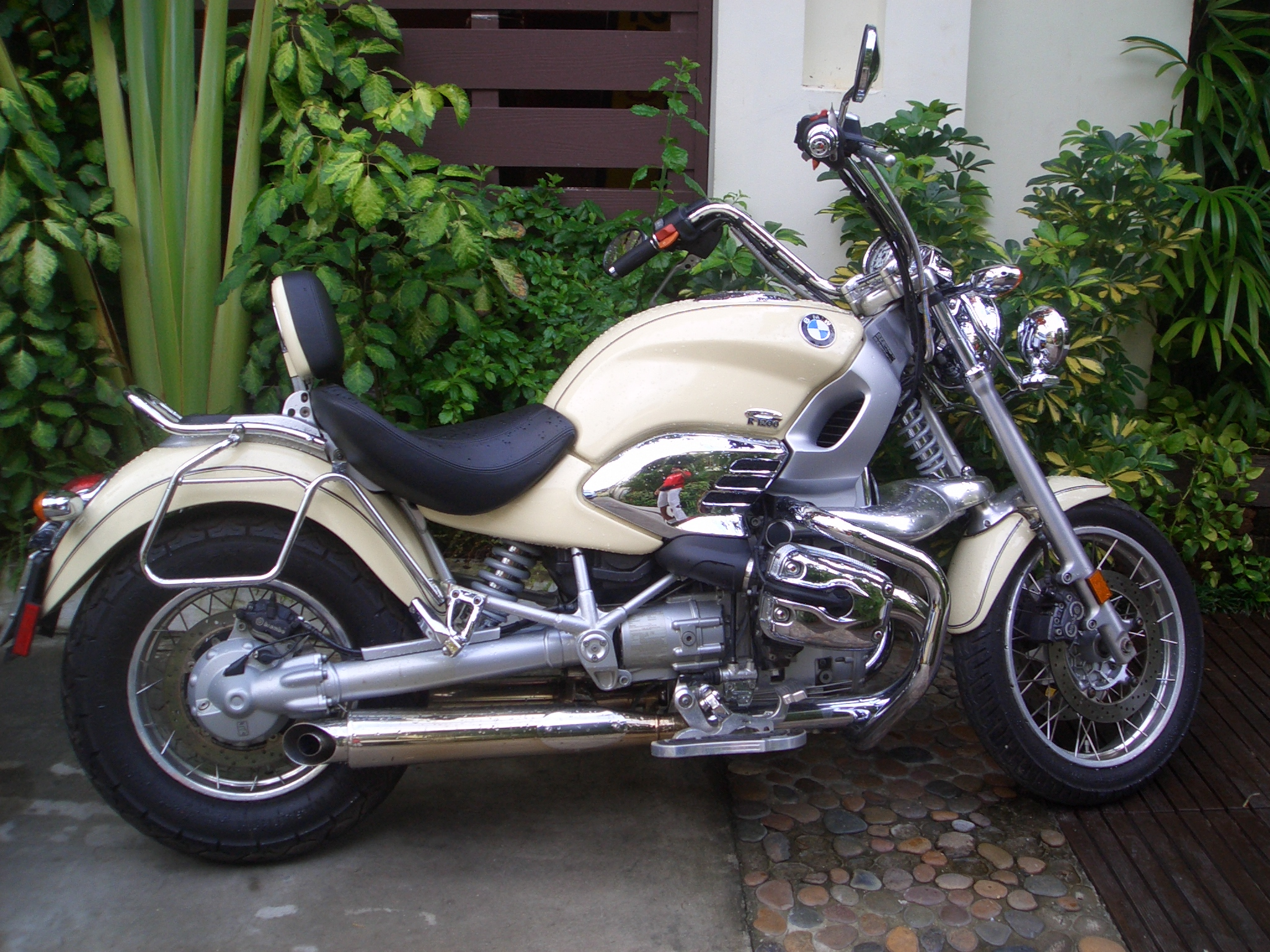
BMW R 1200 C (1997–2004)

Beginning with the BMW R 1100 RS sports tourer in 1993, BMW began to transition from engines with air-cooled cylinder heads ("airhead" engines) to oil-cooled cylinder heads ("oilhead" engines). The BMW R 1100 RS also used "Telelever" front suspension (where braking forces are transferred horizontally to minimize "fork dive") and a stressed engine.

Also introduced in 1993 were the single-cylinder BMW F 650 models, which was based on the Aprilia Pegaso 650. The related BMW F650 CS began production in 2001.

The "airhead" BMW R80R; R100R and R100R Mystic as well as BMW R 80 GS and R 100 GS models remained in production until 1997, before being replaced by the newer "oilhead" models such as the BMW R 850 series, the 1994–1999 BMW R 1100 R standard motorcycle, the 1994–1999 BMW R 1100 GS dual-sport, the 1996–2001 BMW R 1100 RT tourer, the 1998–2005 BMW R 1100 S sports, and the 1999–2004 BMW R1150 GS dual-sport.

The K Series models, powered by a water-cooled inline-four engine, included the 1996–2004 BMW K 1200 RS sports tourer, the 1998–2009 BMW K 1200 LT luxury tourer, and the 2002–2005 BMW K 1200 GT sports tourer.

The BMW R 1200 C, produced from 1997 to 2004, was BMW Motorcycle's only entry into the cruiser market. At the other end of the model lineup, the 2000–2002 BMW C1 was BMW's first and only enclosed scooter model.

=== 2004–2014 ===
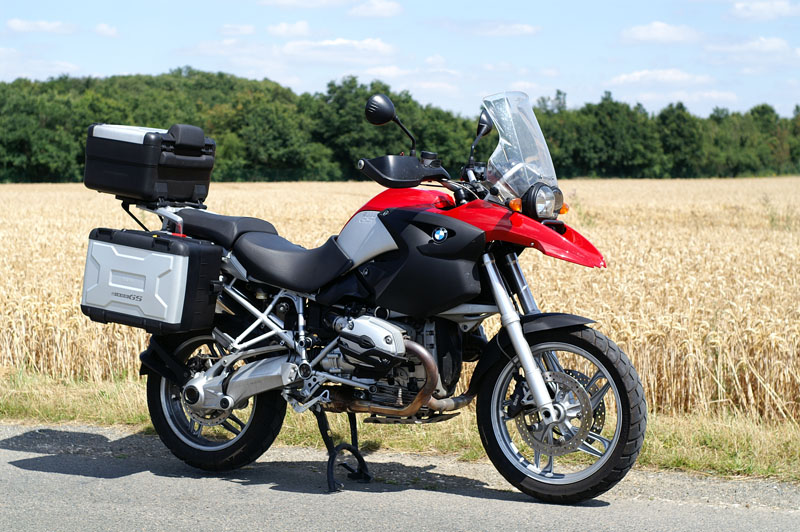
BMW R 1200 GS (2004–2012)

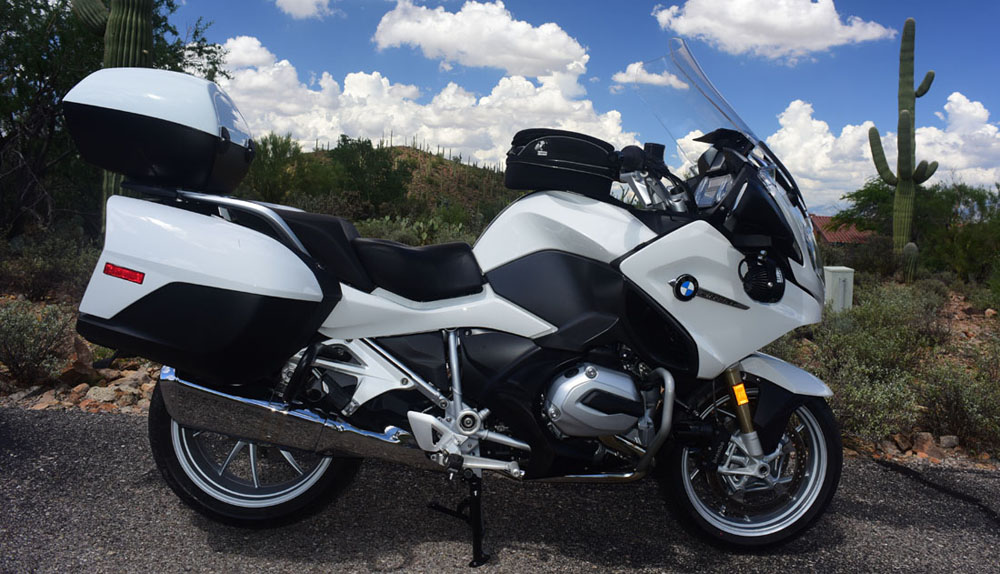
BMW R 1200 RT (2014–2018)

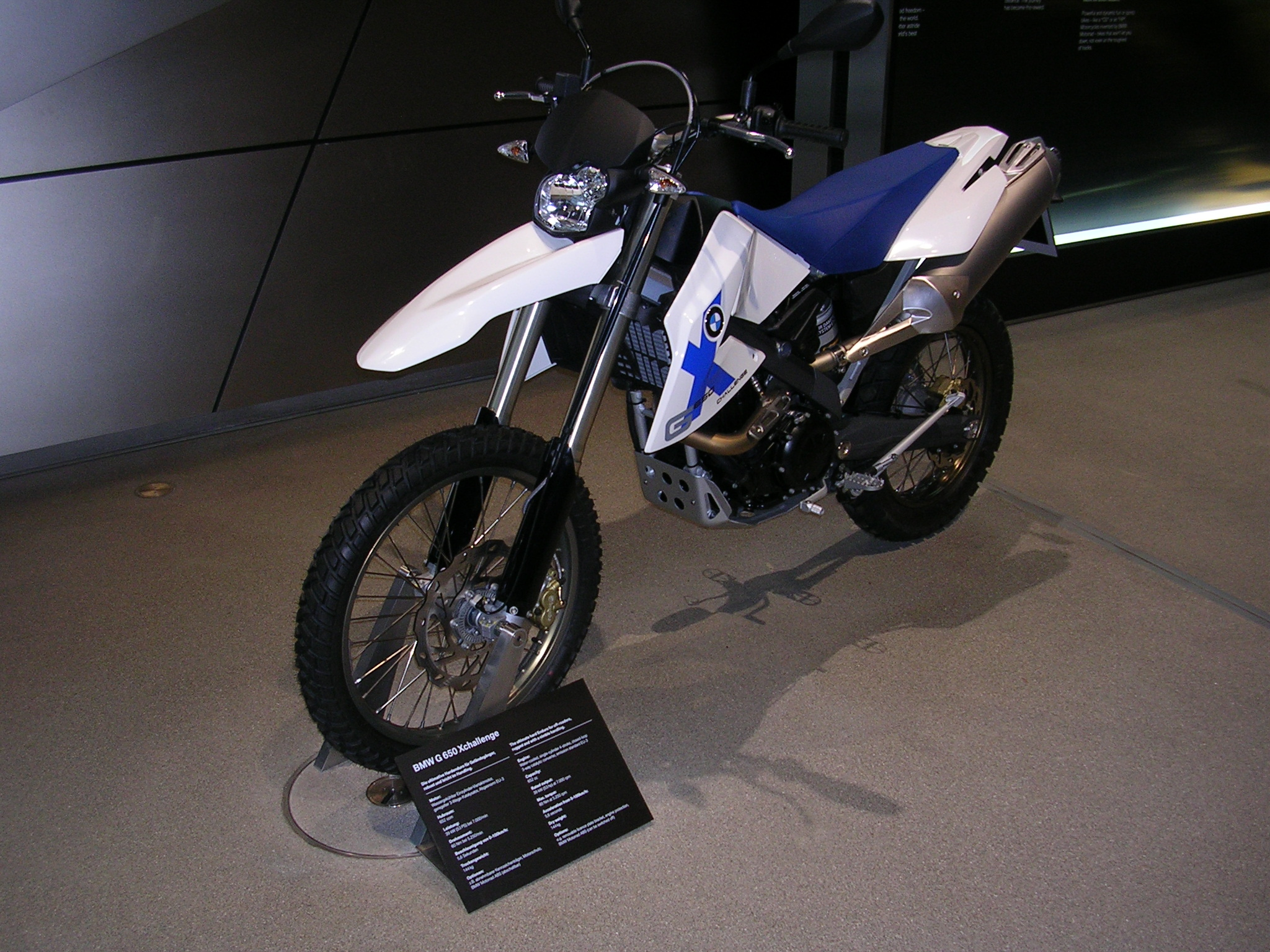
BMW G650 Xchallenge (2006–2009)

The revised K Series range of water-cooled inline-four cylinder models began in 2004 with the BMW K 1200 S a sport-tourer. The K1200S was primarily designed as a Super Sport motorcycle, albeit larger and heavier than the closest Japanese competitors. Other additions to the K Series range were the 2005 BMW K 1200 R naked bike and related 2007 BMW K 1200 R Sport semi-faired sport-tourer, and the 2006 BMW K 1200 GT sport-tourer. The engine capacity of the K Series was expanded to 1,300 cc (79 cu in) for the 2008 BMW K 1300 S sport-tourer, the 2009 BMW K 1300 GT sport-tourer and the 2009 BMW K 1300 R naked bike.

In 2011, two six-cylinder models were added to the K Series range- the BMW K 1600 GT and BMW K 1600 GTL, the former intended as a sport-tourer and the latter as a luxury-tourer.

The R Series range of flat-twin models was also updated in 2004, beginning with the BMW R 1200 GS dual-sport, which was powered by a new 1,170 cc (71 cu in) "oilhead" engine. This was followed by the 2005 BMW R 1200 ST sport-tourer, the 2005 BMW R 1200 RT tourer, the 2006 BMW R 1200 S sport-tourer, and the 2006 BMW R 1200 R naked bike. In 2014, the redesigned BMW R1200 RT used a water-cooled engine and a wet clutch.

The BMW HP2 Enduro dirt bike was introduced in 2005, based on the BMW R 1200 GS. In 2007, the HP2 Enduro was joined by the road-biased HP2 Megamoto fitted with smaller alloy wheels and street tyres.

As part of the F Series range update in 2006, the BMW F 800 S sports bike and BMW F 800 ST sport-touring models were introduced, both powered by a Rotax parallel-twin engine. The BMW F 650 GS and BMW F800 GS dual-sport bikes were added to the range in 2008, both using the same 798 cc engine, despite the different names and the F 700 GS replaced the 650 in 2012. In 2009, the BMW F 800 R naked bike was introduced and in 2013 the BMW F 800 GT replaced the BMW F 800 ST sport-touring. In 2009, the BMW G 650 GS replaced the BMW F 650 GS.

The BMW G650X series range was introduced in 2006, co-developed with Aprilia and powered by a Rotax single-cylinder engine. The range consisted of the BMW G650 Xchallenge dual-sport, the BMW G650 Xcountry dual-sport and the G650 Xmoto supermoto models. The BMW G 450 X hard-enduro model was produced from 2008 to 2010.

In 2007, BMW acquired Husqvarna Motorcycles, including its production facilities and staff, from Italian manufacturer MV Agusta. BMW's ownership of Husqvarna ended in 2013, when the company was sold to Pierer Industrie AG.

The BMW S 1000 RR sport bike was released in 2009, to compete in the Superbike World Championship. It is powered by a 999 cc (61 cu in) transverse-four engine producing 193 bhp (144 kW).

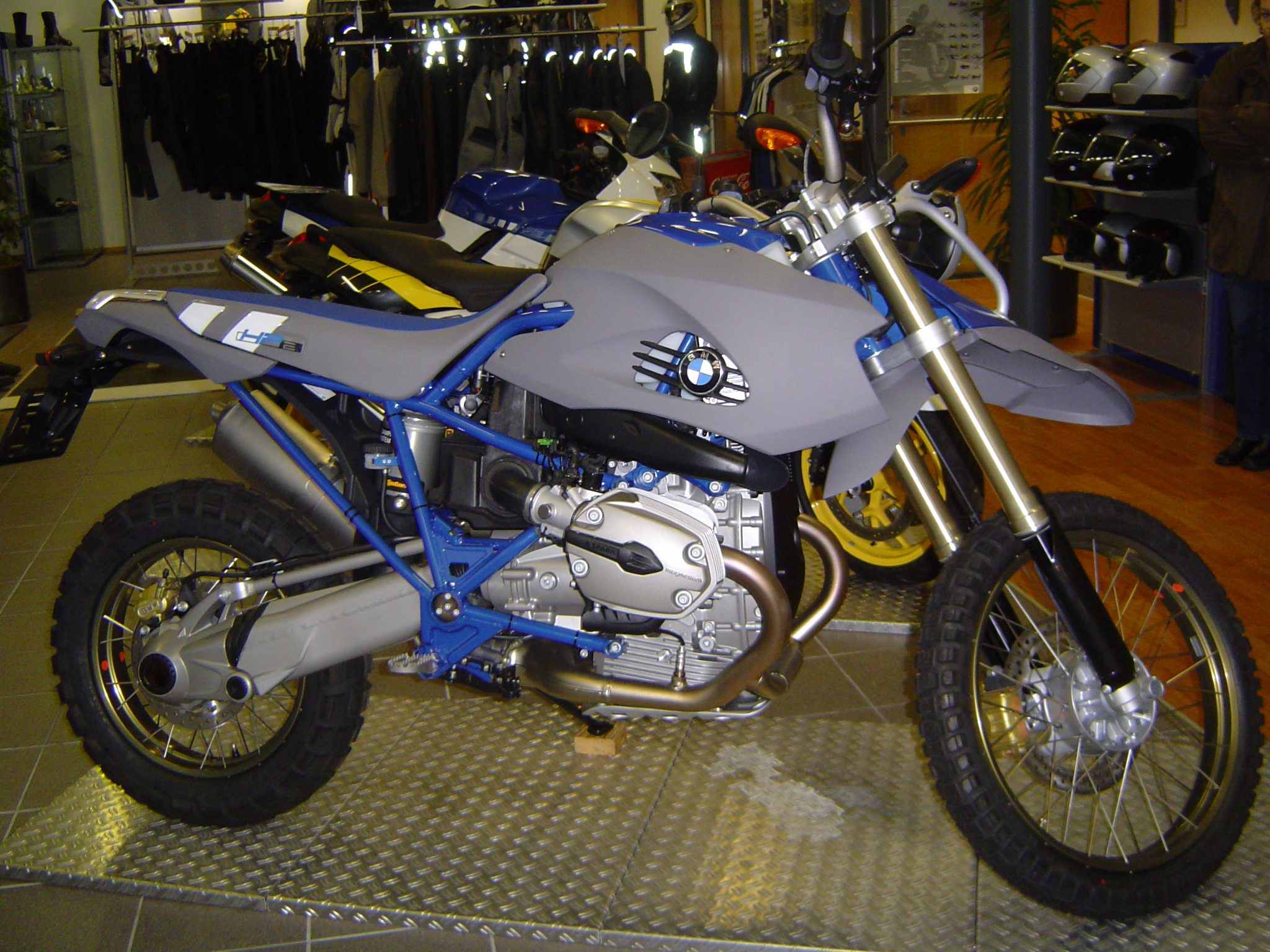
BMW HP2 Enduro
(2005–2008)

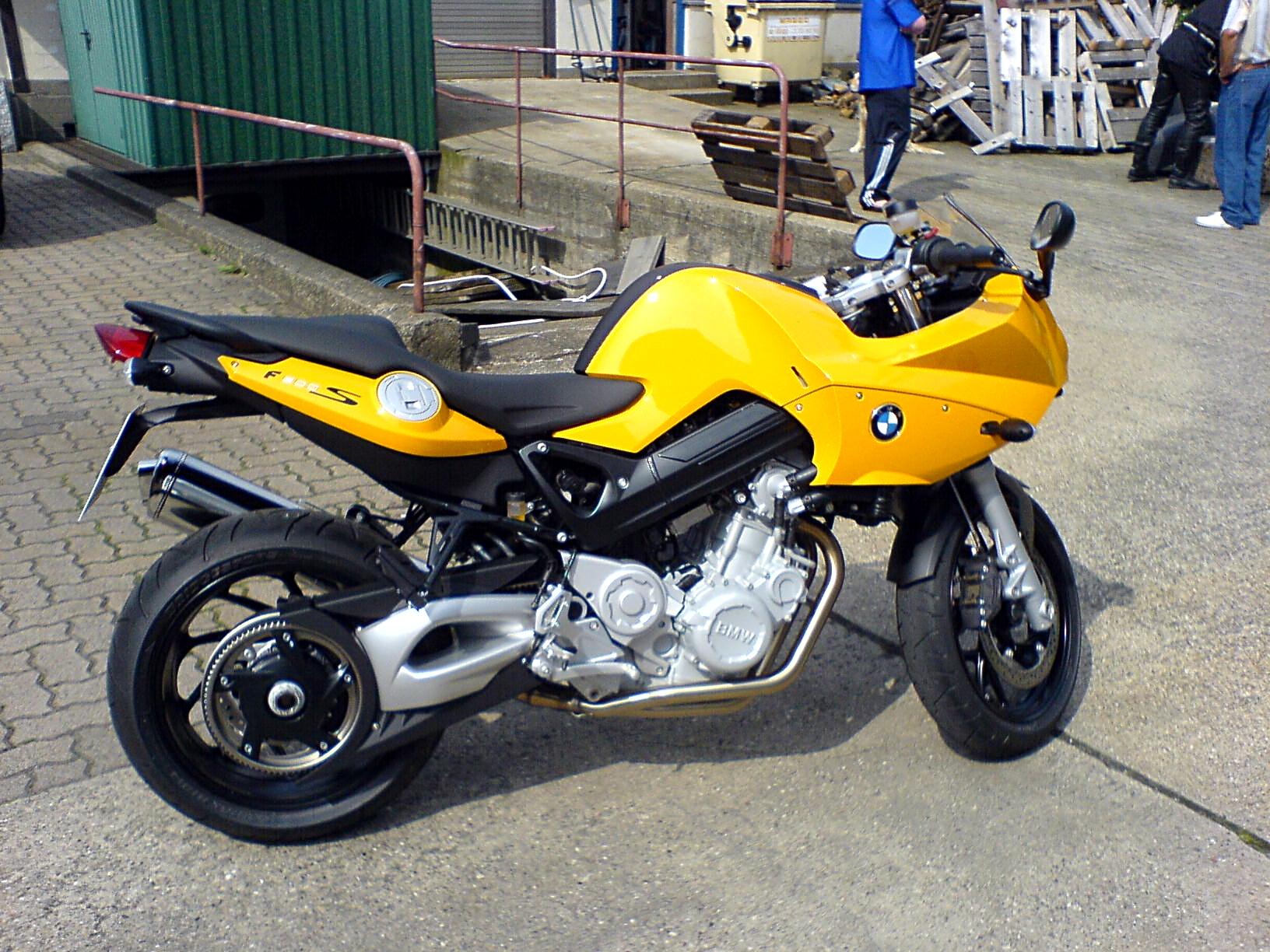
BMW F 800 S
(2006–2010)

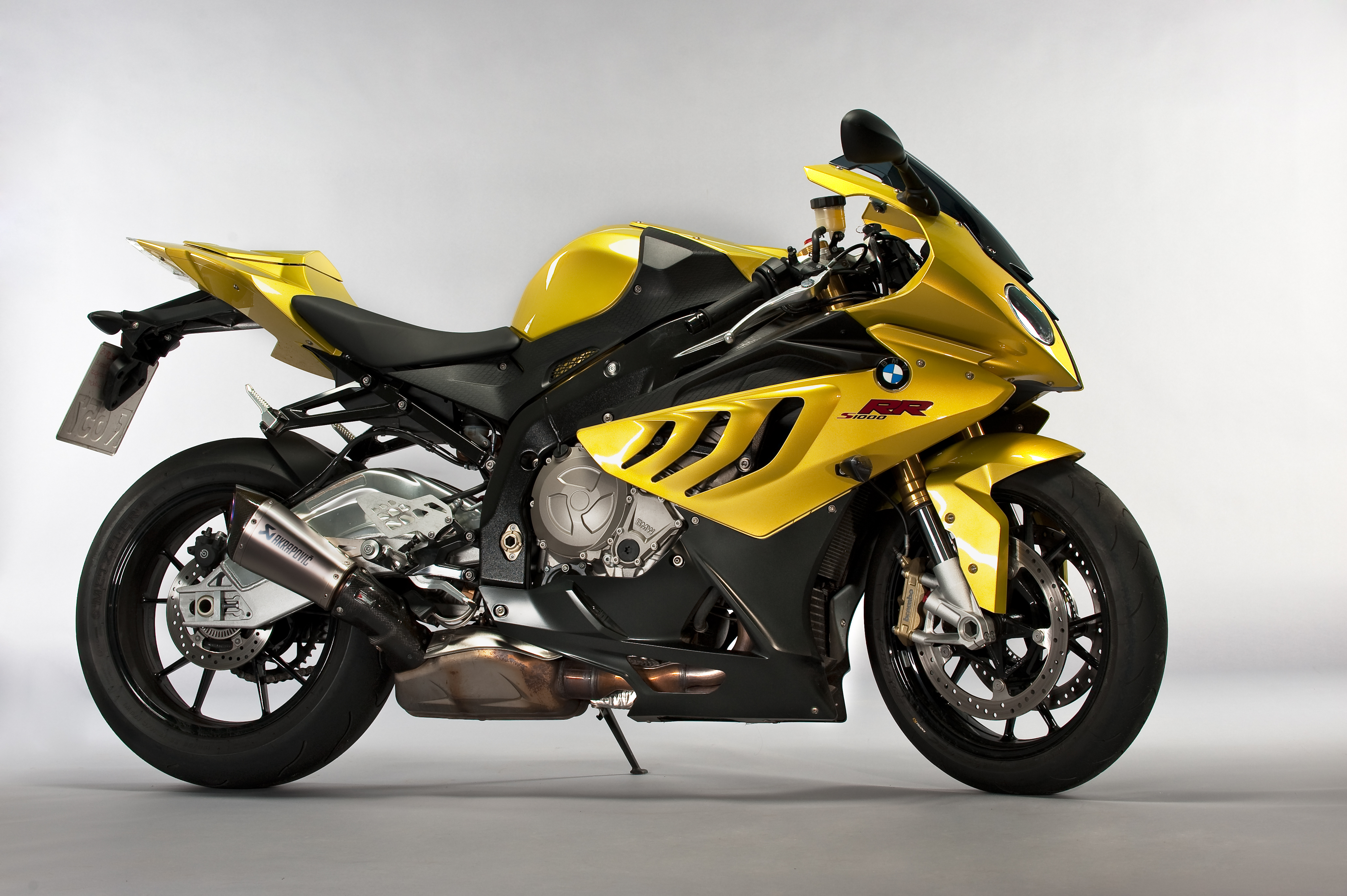
BMW S 1000 RR
(2009–present)

== See also ==
- History of BMW
