= BMW R2 =

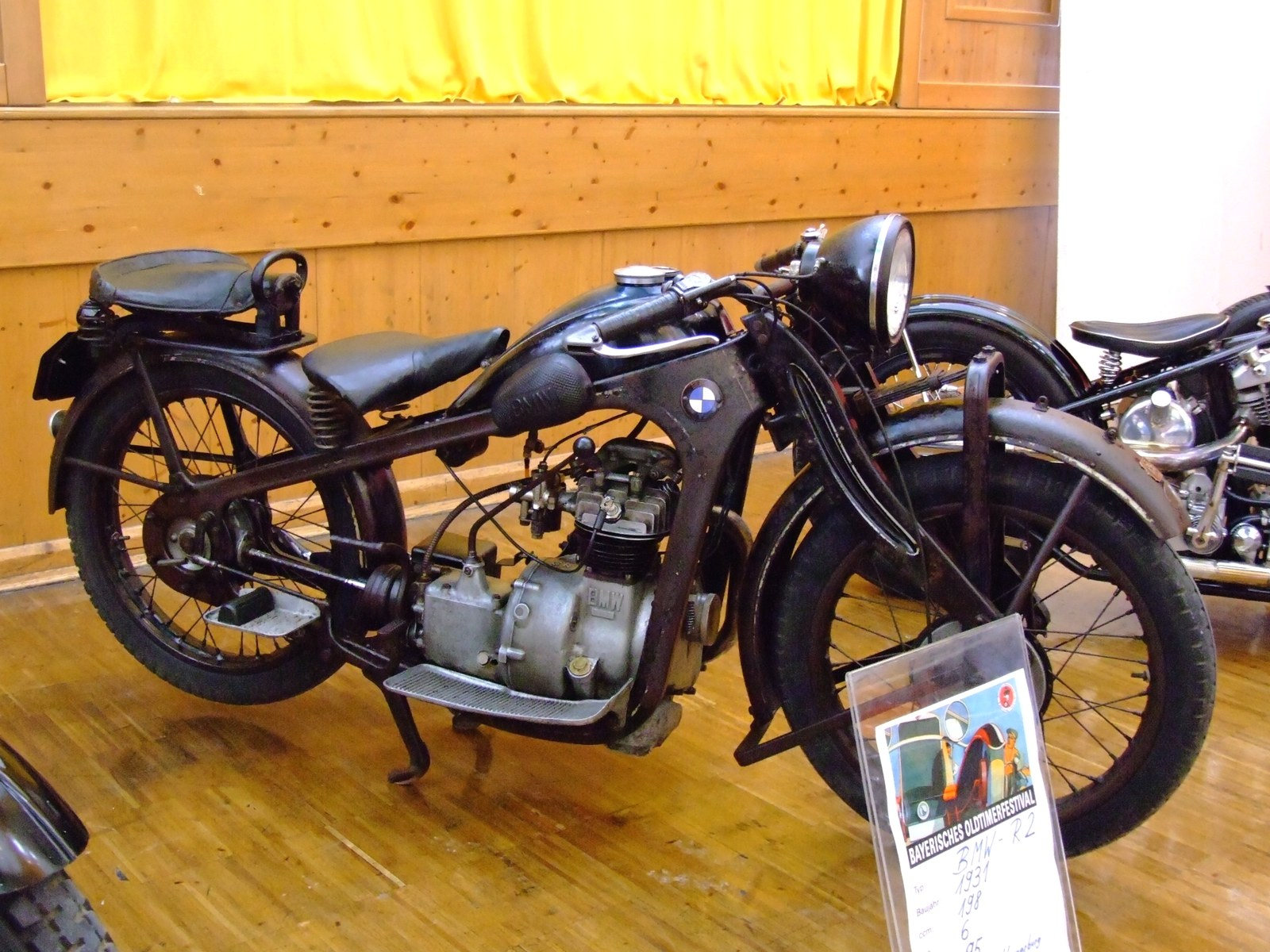
- Manufacturer: BMW Motorrad
- Production: 1931–1936
- Successor: BMW R42, BMW R47
- Class: standard
- Engine: 198 cc OHV 4-stroke vertical single-cylinder
- Bore / stroke: 63 mm × 64 mm (2.48 in × 2.52 in)
- Top speed: 95 km/h (59 mph)
- Power: 6 hp (4.5 kW) (later 8 hp (6.0 kW)) @ 3,500 rpm
- Transmission: 3-speed manual
- Suspension: Front: One cantilever spring Rear: none
- Brakes: Front: drum Rear: drum
- Tires: 25 × 3 front and rear
- Wheelbase: 1,320 mm (52 in)
- Dimensions: L: 1,950 mm (77 in); W: 850 mm (33 in); H: 950 mm (37 in)
- Weight: 122 kg (269 lb) (wet)
- Fuel capacity: 11 L (2.4 imp gal; 2.9 US gal)

The BMW R2 was a 198 cc overhead valve single-cylinder motorcycle produced by BMW between 1931 and 1936, the smallest motorcycle ever to enter series production with the firm (In 1948, a 125cc 2 stroke flat twin, designated R10, was developed but did not enter production). Despite its much smaller design and engine capacity, the R2 retained many features of the larger boxer twin motorcycles in the range, such as cardan shaft drive and a pressed-steel duplex frame. The R2 was the smallest in the range of singles produced during the 1930s by BMW, with its big brothers being the 305 cc R3 and the 400 cc R4.

== Background ==
In 1925, BMW introduced the 247 cc R39, their first single-cylinder motorcycle. The R39 did not sell well and was discontinued in 1927.

Following the collapse of the Weimar Republic economy during the Wall Street crash of 1929, BMW's premier large capacity, expensive motorcycle range was hard hit, with fewer customers able to afford their premium purchase costs. BMW therefore felt the need to introduce a smaller bike into their range, which offered both cheaper purchase costs and less expensive running costs. The firm also wished to expand their range by making a bike available to riders without a motorcycle licence, which was not required for bikes under 200 cc. This led to the R2's introduction in 1931 in the form of the Series 1, of which 4,161 units were sold during its one-year production run until the introduction of the improved Series 2A the following year. It was known as the "people's bike", and was priced at 975 RM, compared to 1,750 RM for the 750 cc flat-twin R11 Series 2 of the same year.

== Models ==
In all models, the 198 cc overhead valve four-stroke engine was mounted in a pressed-steel frame. It featured both sump oil and forced-feed lubrication provided by a geared oil pump, was coupled through a single-plate dry clutch to a three-speed gearbox, giving a top speed of 95 km/h (59 mph). It also used drum brakes, like the larger twin of the BMW range. Power output was rated at 6 hp (4.5 kW), until the introduction of the British Amal carburetor, boosting the power output to 8 hp (6.0 kW). The coil electrical ignition system and the generator were supplied by Bosch. The engine was offset toward the right of the frame, to allow it to drive the rear wheel directly when in top gear.

=== Variants ===
Series 1 (1931): the only model to feature exposed valve springs on the top of the finned cylinder head

Series 2A (1932): the previously exposed valve springs were covered

Series 2/33 (1933): the option of the British Amal (as opposed to the German Sum) carburetor was offered (around 80 units were sold with this specification) and (from June 1933) a friction damper was introduced for improved steering control whilst riding

Series 3 (1934): the Sum carburetor was withdrawn as an option, replaced by the British Amal, which increased the power output from 6 to 8 hp

Series 4 (1935): smaller tank and modified headlight

Series 5 (1936): changed ratio of the shaft drive and wider rear fender with license plate holder

== See also ==
- History of BMW motorcycles
- BMW Motorrad – the division of BMW that manufactures motorcycles today
