= R45 =

R45 may refer to:

- R45 (EP), by Death Piggy
- R45 (South Africa), a road
- BMW R45, a motorcycle
- HMS Tenacious (R45), a destroyer of the Royal Navy
- R45: May cause cancer, a risk phrase
