= BMW R27 =

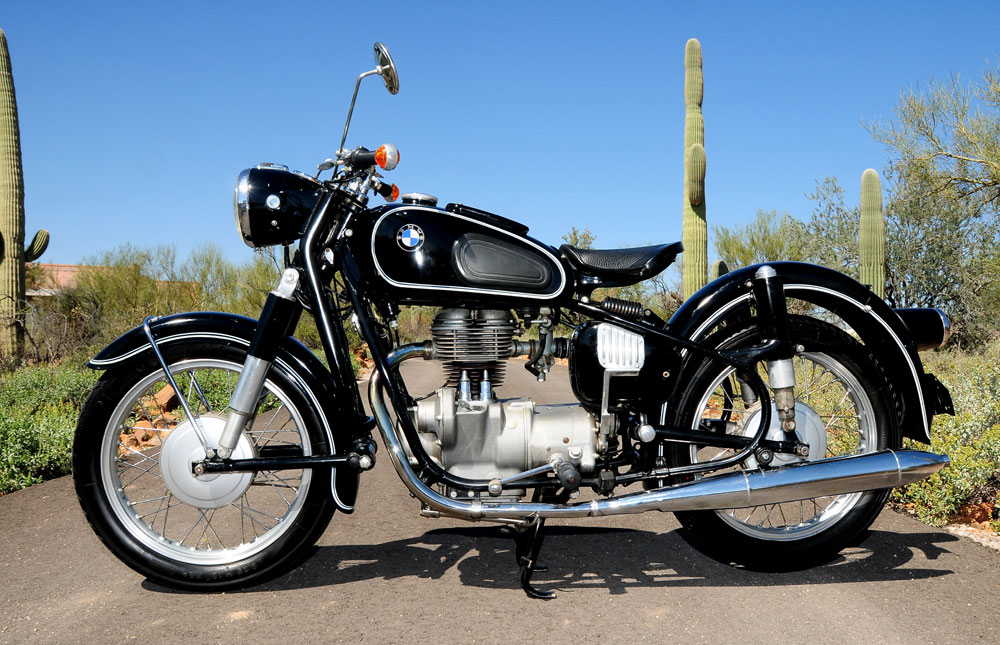
- 1964 BMW R27
- Manufacturer: BMW
- Production: 1960–1966; 15,364 made
- Assembly: Milbertshofen, Munich, West Germany
- Predecessor: BMW R26
- Class: S
- Engine: OHV single
- Bore / stroke: 68 mm × 68 mm (2.7 in × 2.7 in)
- Compression ratio: 8.2:1
- Top speed: 130 km/h (81 mph)
- Power: 18 hp (13 kW) @ 7400 rpm
- Transmission: Four-speed, left foot shift
- Suspension: Front: Earles fork; Rear: Swingarm, two coil spring / shock absorber units
- Tires: 3.25 x 18 front and rear
- Wheelbase: 1,379 mm (54.3 in)
- Weight: 162 kg (357 lb) (wet)
- Fuel capacity: 15 L (3.3 imp gal; 4.0 US gal)
- Oil capacity: 1.2 L (0.26 imp gal; 0.32 US gal)

The 247 cc BMW R27, introduced in 1960, is a shaft-driven, single in-line cylinder motorcycle manufactured by BMW.

== History ==
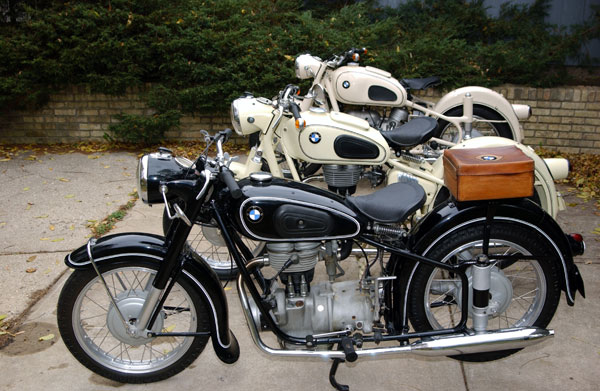
1954 R25/3 — R27 and R60/2 in the background.

After World War II, the Potsdam Agreement of the USSR, USA, and the UK, prohibited BMW Aktiengesellschaft (AG) from building motorcycles. Later, this ban was lifted and in 1948 BMW produced its first postwar motorcycle, the 250 cc R24, which was based largely on the prewar R23. It was the only postwar BMW motorcycle produced without a rear suspension. BMW introduced the R25 model, with plunger rear suspension, in 1950. The last of the plunger models, the R25/3, was introduced in 1953.

== R26 ==
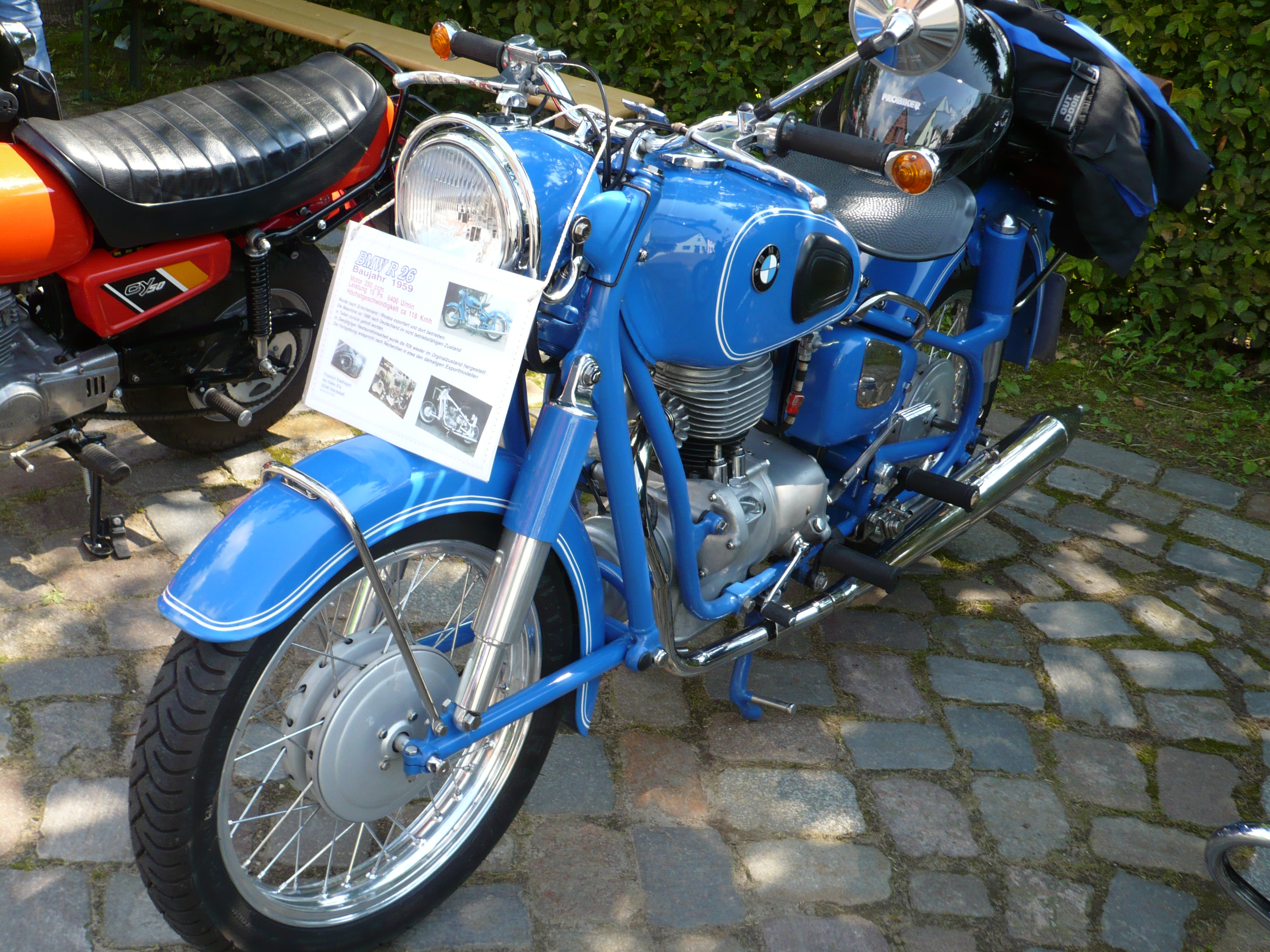
1959 BMW R26

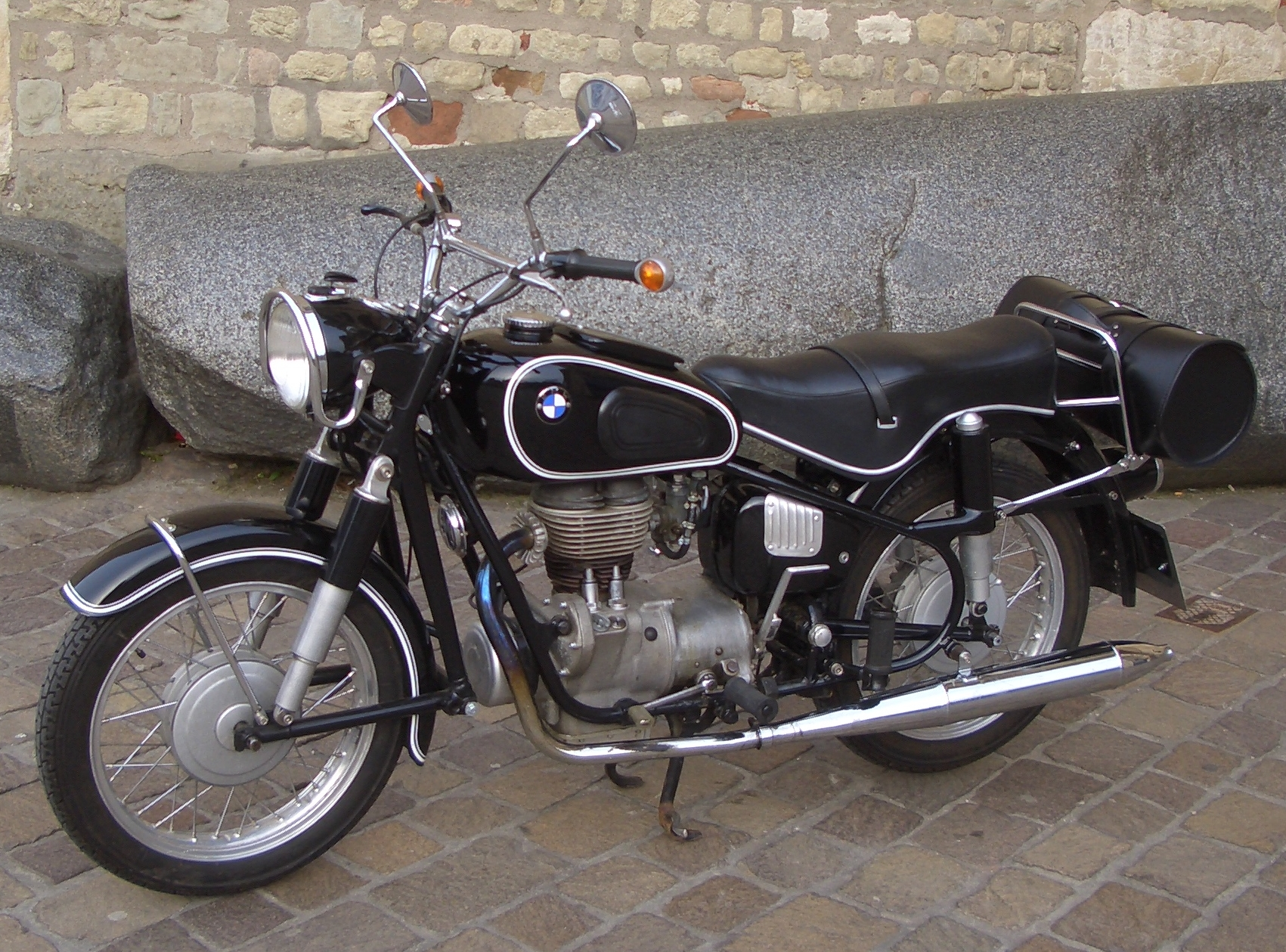
1960 BMW R26

In 1956 BMW introduced a completely revamped single-cylinder engine, the R26 (engine numbers 340 001 – 370 236), with improvements paralleling those introduced at the same time in the boxer twins. The R26 came with an enclosed drive shaft, rear swingarm, and front Earles forks. A new headlight nacelle came with a sliding black plastic over the ignition key, and the “bell-bottom” front fender was dropped along with the mechanics' hand shifter. The engine of the R26 was bolted directly to the frame, and produced 15 hp (11 kW).

== R27 ==
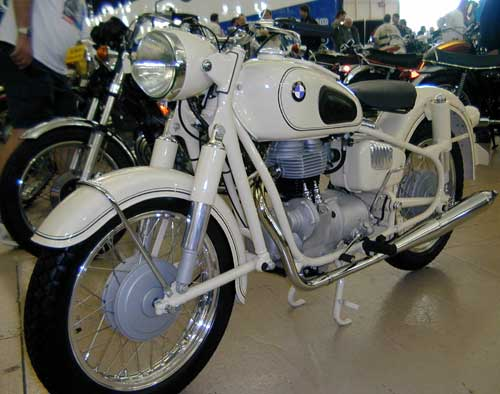
Dover white BMW R27

Based largely on the R26, in 1960 the R27 added rubber mounts for the engine and boosted power to 18 hp (13 kW). The 250 cc OHV vertical single was the only rubber-mounted thumper engine BMW ever produced, and was their last shaft drive single-cylinder motorcycle. The engine pumped out 18 hp (13 kW), the highest ever for a shaft-drive BMW single. BMW manufactured 15,364 R27 models (engine numbers 372 001 – 387 566 ) over the production years of 1960 to 1966. Some of the 1966 R27 models were sold as 1967 models because dealers in those years often would assign dates to BMW motorcycles when they sold them, and not necessarily when they were manufactured.

BMW did things differently from other manufacturers, which is evident in the R27. Its enclosed shaft final drive is rare for a single cylinder motorcycle, but it also had a triangulated Earles front fork (named after English designer Ernest Earles), meaning the motorcycle had a front swing arm as well as a rear swing arm. When the front brake lever was squeezed hard, the front end didn't dive, but rather rose slightly. Thus, braking was a very steady activity, even if they were weak by today's standards. The engine's crankshaft was laid out fore-and-aft rather than side-to-side, which was also a rare feature on motorcycles. This way, the crank and the final shaft were in line, and drive forces did not have to be run through a set of 90-degree gears. The kick starter also swung out sideways instead of parallel to the frame.

== Technical data ==
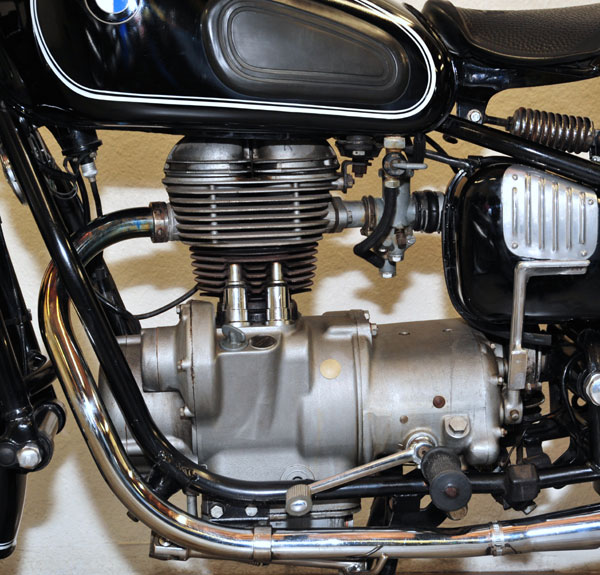
R27 engine

	R27
Engine Numbers	372 001 – 387 566
Design	Single cylinder with driveshaft
Engine	4-stroke, 2 OHV
Transmission	Four-speed, left foot
Model years	1960–1966
Number manufactured	15,364
Bore	68 mm (2.7 in)
Stroke	68 mm (2.7 in)
Capacity	247 cc
Power	18 hp (13 kW) @ 7400 rpm
Compression ratio	8.2:1
Fuel efficiency	60.3 miles per US gallon (3.90 L/100 km; 72.4 mpg_{‑imp}) DIN 70030
Maximum speed	81 mph (130 km/h) / with side car 56 mph (90 km/h)
Wheelbase	54.3 in (1,379 mm)
Curb weight	357 lb (162 kg)
GVWR	716 lb (325 kg) / with side car 1,058 lb (480 kg)
Tires front & rear	3.25 x 18
Battery	6 volt, 9 Ah.
Tank capacity	3.96 US gallon (15 liter)
Engine oil capacity	2.6 US pint (1.2 liter)
Transmission capacity	650 cc
Rear drive capacity	125 cc

== See also ==
- History of BMW motorcycles
