= BMW G650X series =

Series of motorcycles produced by BMW Motorrad

BMW G650X
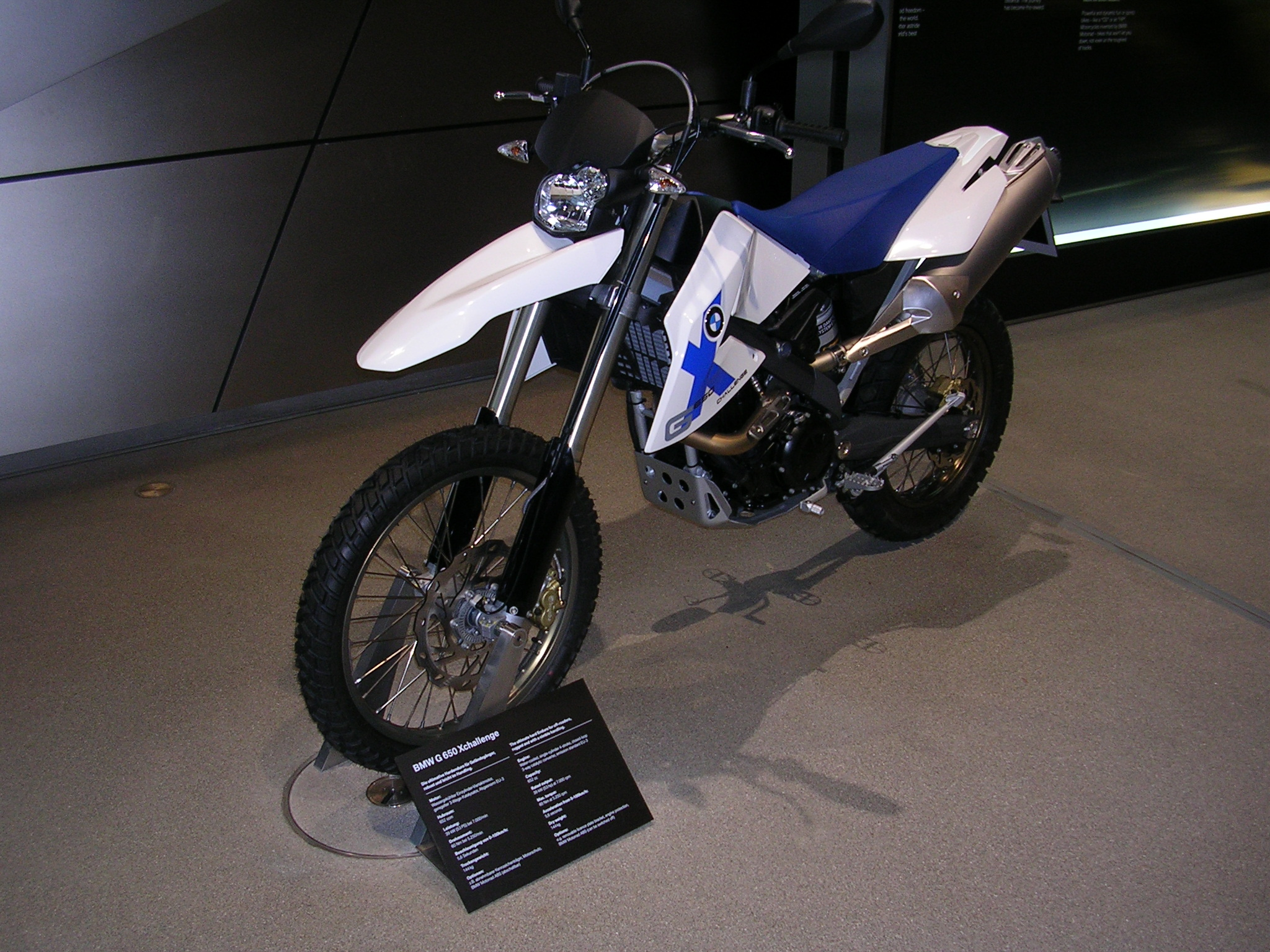
- BMW G650 Xchallenge at BMW Welt, Munich, 2008
- Manufacturer: BMW Motorrad
- Production: 2006–2009
- Predecessor: BMW F650
- Class: Xchallenge: Dual-sport; Xcountry: Dual-sport; Xmoto: Supermoto
- Engine: 652 cc (39.8 cu in) Rotax, fuel injected, single-cylinder, four-stroke, liquid-cooled, DOHC, 4-valves
- Power: 39 kW (52 hp) @ 7000 rpm
- Torque: 60 N⋅m (44 lb⋅ft) @ 5250 rpm
- Transmission: 5-speed, O-ring chain
- Frame type: Composite steel bridge frame with aluminum side panels and rear frame
- Suspension: Front: telescopic Rear: air
- Brakes: Front: 300mm disc Rear: 265mm disc
- Wheelbase: 59.1 in (1,500 mm)
- Dimensions: L: 86.8 in (2,200 mm)
- Seat height: 36.6 in (930 mm)
- Weight: Xchallenge: 144 kg (317 lb); Xcountry: 147 kg (324 lb); Xmoto: 148 kg (326 lb) (dry)
- Fuel capacity: 10 L (2.2 imp gal; 2.6 US gal)

The BMW G650X was a series of motorcycles produced by BMW from 2006 to 2009.

The three models were: the G650 Xchallenge, the G650 Xmoto, and the G650 Xcountry. The same updated Rotax engine first seen on the BMW F650 was shared among the three models. Later, BMW got the engine from Loncin in China, while the bikes were assembled in Italy. The single-cylinder, four-stroke, 652 cc (39.8 cu in) engine was liquid-cooled and features DOHC. The engine produced 53 hp (40 kW) and 60 N⋅m (44 lb⋅ft) of power and torque at 7000 and 5250 RPM respectively. The three models shared all major components and are differentiated by their fairing and wheel sizes, therefore, the models vary in weight.

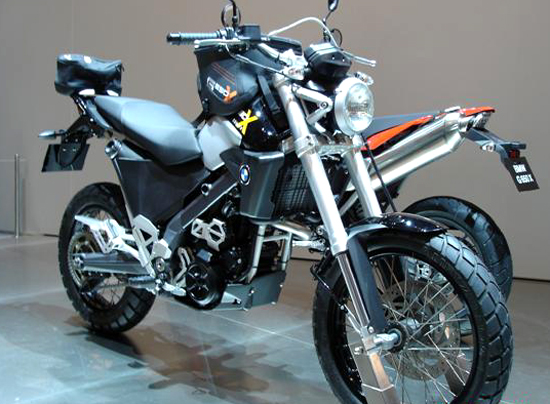
BMW G650 Xcountry

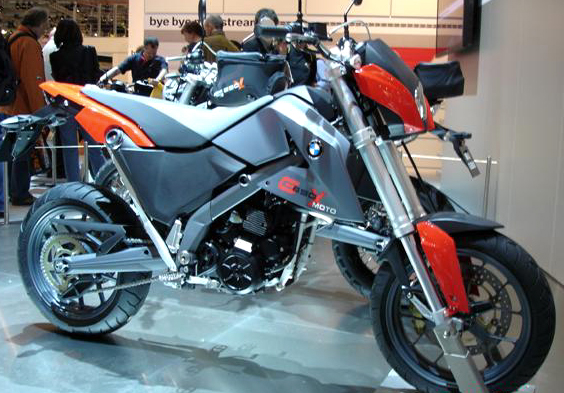
BMW G650 Xmoto
