= BMW R11 =

BMW Touring Motorcycle, produced 1930–1934

BMW R 11
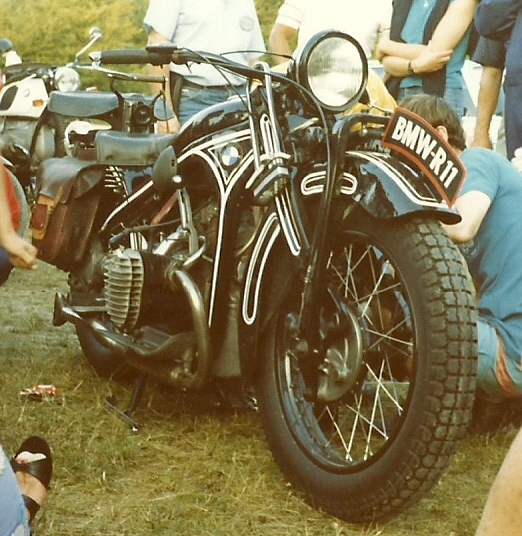
- BMW R 11
- Manufacturer: BMW Motorrad
- Production: 1930–1934
- Predecessor: R 62
- Successor: R 12
- Engine: 745cc four-stroke two-cylinder
- Bore / stroke: 78 mm × 78 mm (3.1 in × 3.1 in)
- Compression ratio: 5.5:1
- Top speed: 100 km (62 mi)
- Power: 13 kW (18 hp) @ 3,400 rpm
- Frame type: pressed-steel
- Suspension: trailing-link fork, rear unsprung
- Weight: 162 kg (357 lb) (dry)
- Fuel capacity: 14 L (3.1 imp gal; 3.7 US gal)

The BMW R 11 was the first touring motorcycle in the 750cc class manufactured by the German motorcycle manufacturer BMW with a pressed-steel frame in duplex form, in the vein of the Neander motorcycle of Ernst Neumann-Neander.

7,500 R 11 motorcycles were produced between 1930 and 1934.

== History ==
At the London Olympic Show in November 1928, BMW presented the R 11 and R 16, their first motorcycles with pressed steel frames. In BMW's price lists No. 37 and No. 38 from January and February 1929, the motorcycles were announced for early 1930. The motorcycles were no longer listed in March 1929's price list No. 39. Delivery of the motorcycles first began in Germany in the summer of 1930.

== Mechanics ==
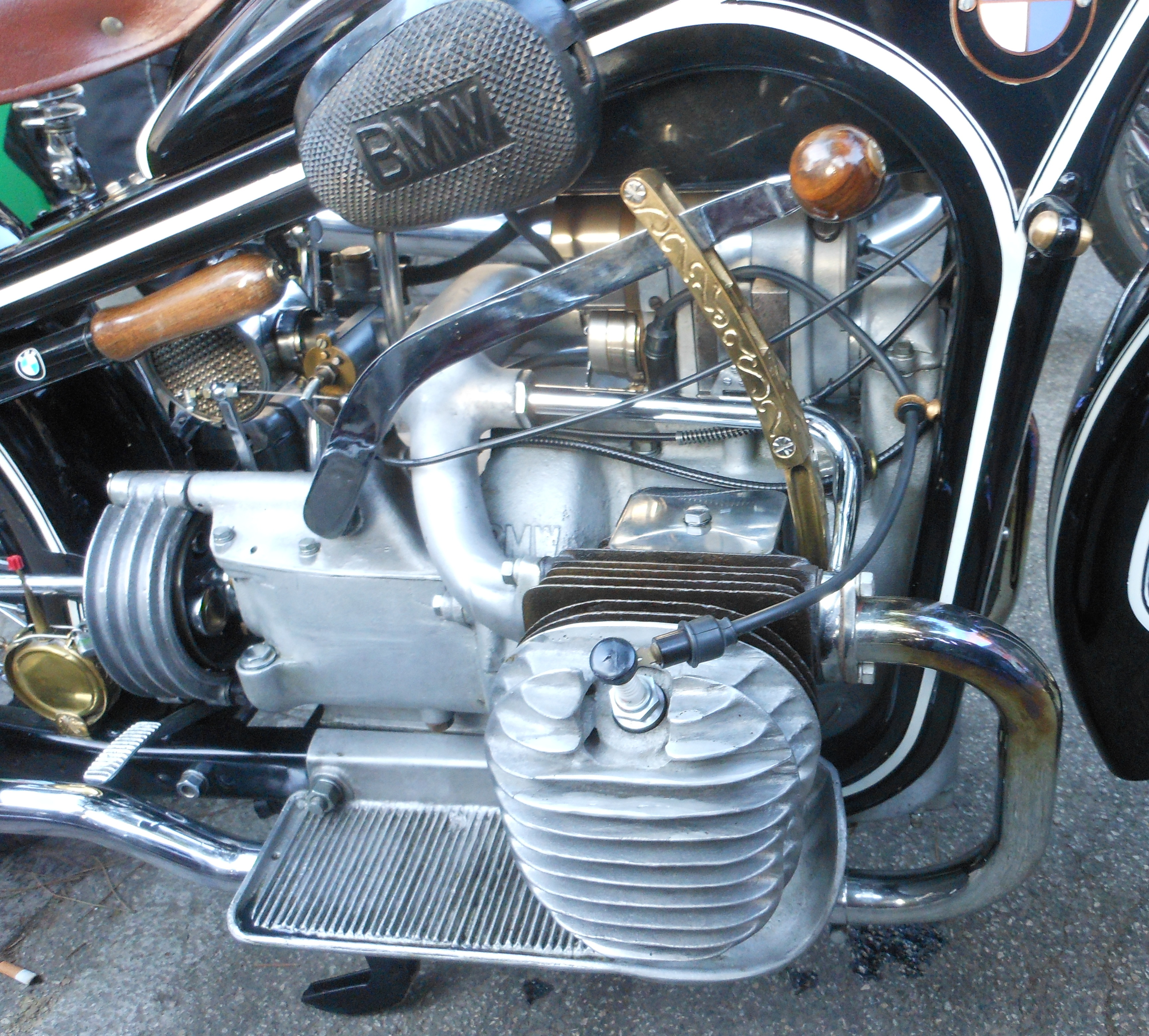
Series 1 engine (1929)

=== Engine ===
Its longitudinally mounted M 56 engine was a four-stroke two-cylinder valve-in-block boxer engine.

=== Construction ===
The engine housing could be opened horizontally. An intermediate gear above the crankshaft drove the camshaft, which was located one level higher and in turn drove the ignition system on the next level via a timing chain. In the predecessor R 62, the ignition system was still driven by a gear from the camshaft.

The camshaft opened the valves via short sliding tappets.

=== Cylinder ===
The gray iron cylinder had removable aluminium cylinder heads and radial cooling fins.

=== Carburetor ===
The carburetor, designed in-house by BMW, sucked air in through the flywheel housing.

The mixture composition, choke, was adjusted using a lever on the right-hand side of the handlebars.

=== Transmission ===
The R 11 had a manual transmission with a driveshaft on the right side of the unsprung rear wheel.

BMW referred to the power transmission as a Kardanantrieb, German for a transmission using a universal joint — technically speaking, it was merely a shaft drive to the rear wheel, as there were no universal joints.

The horizontally split gearbox housing was bolted directly to the engine. The input shaft with three gears was driven directly by the single-plate dry clutch in the flywheel of the crankshaft. The output shaft drove the drive shaft via a rag joint in direct extension.

The kickstarter was operated at a right angle to the vehicle's longitudinal axis.

== Versions ==
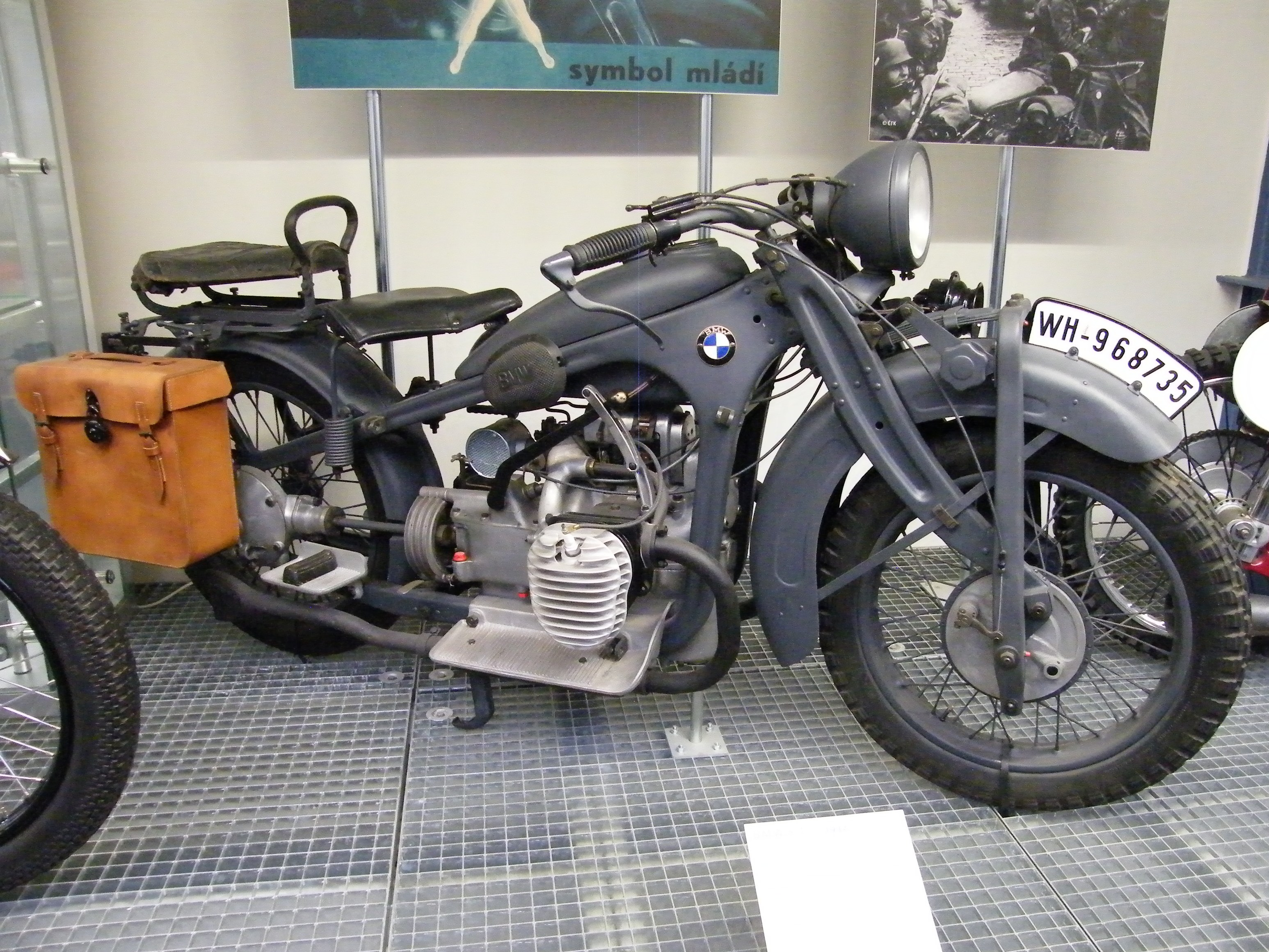
The R 11 in military colors (1932)

=== Series 3 (1932) ===
The Series 3 featured a carburetor from Sum that no longer required mixture adjustment, eliminating the need for the air lever on the right handlebar.

=== Series 5 (1934) ===
Starting with the Series 5, the R 11 was also offered with two Amal carburetors, each with its own air filter. The two carburetors enabled a continuous output of 20 hp and the installation of a 45-watt Bosch "light battery ignition." The exhaust system was also lengthened, allowing the mufflers to be positioned higher.

== Technical data ==
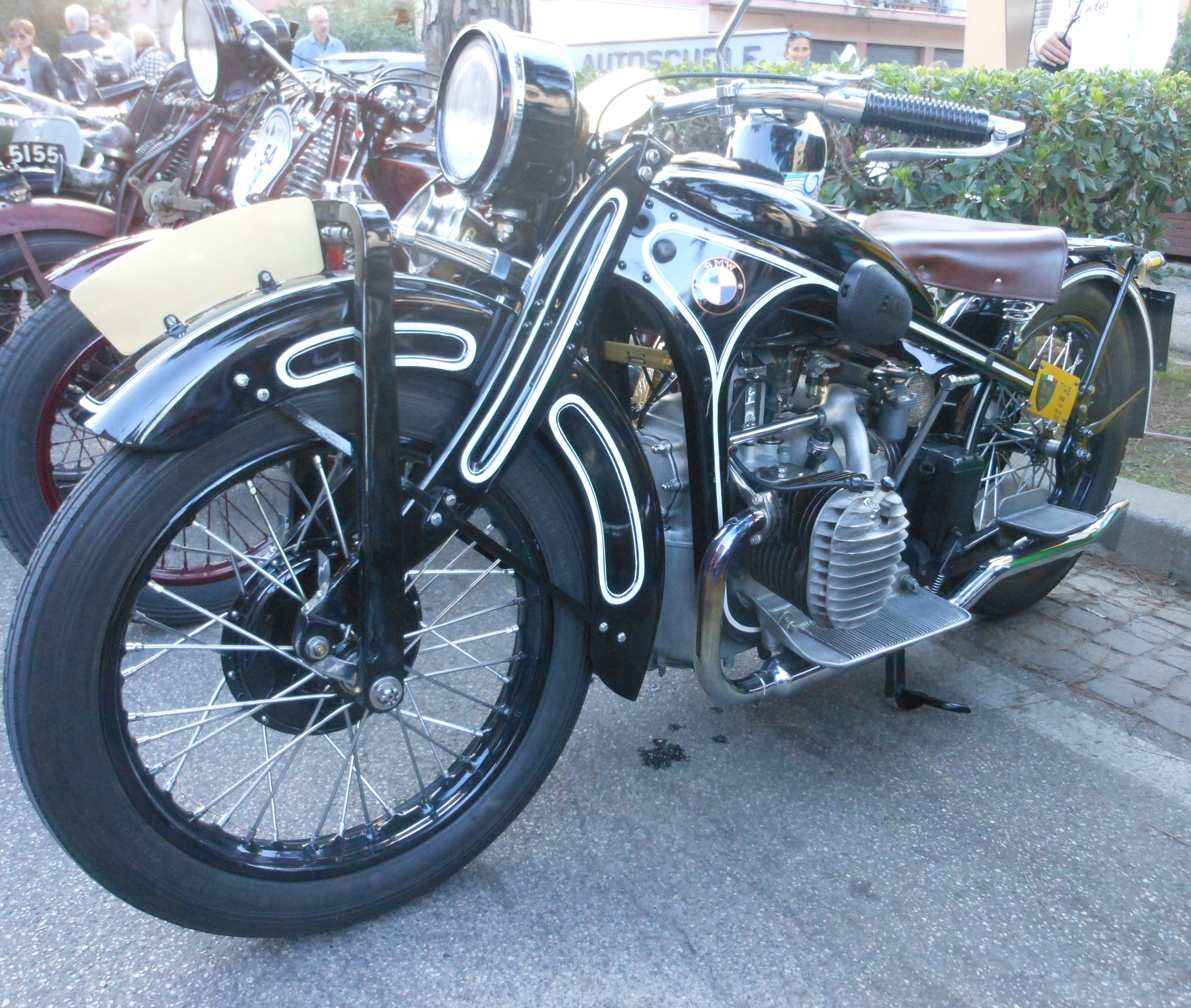
The trailing-link fork front suspension, and the pressed-steel frame visible (1929)

Specification	Data for the R 11
Bore	78 mm
Stroke	78 mm
Displacement	745 cm^{3}
Compression ratio	5.5 : 1
Power output	3400 rpm
Top speed	100 km/h
Curb weight	162 kg
Fuel capacity	14 L

== See also ==
- History of BMW motorcycles
