= BMW R45 =

Model of motorcycle, made 1970s-1980s

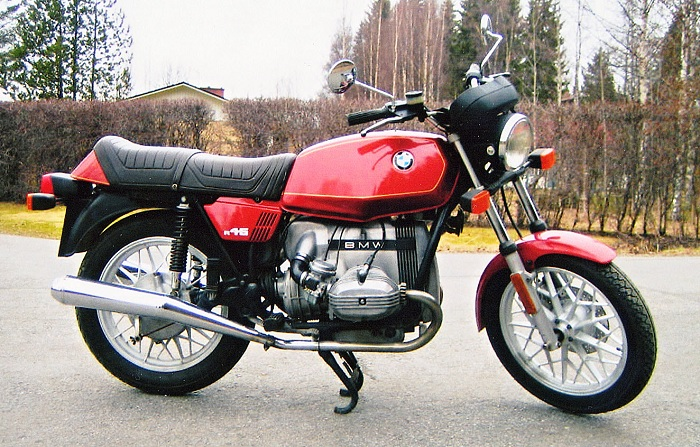
- BMW R45 1979
- Production: 1970s–1985
- Bore / stroke: 70 x 61.5 mm
- Compression ratio: 9.2 : 1
- Top speed: 95 mph
- Power: 35 hp
- Torque: 37.5 Nm

BMW extended its range of horizontally opposed twins in the late 1970s with the introduction of the R45. Looking very much like scaled down versions of BMW's larger models, the R45 featured sharper and modern styling while both weight and overall dimensions were reduced. The Type 247 Engine was used with smaller pistons, carburetors and a different final drive to assist acceleration.

For the German market, the 473cc R45 came with a reduced power output of 27 BHP (@to qualify for favorable insurance) while versions sold elsewhere had 35 BHP on tap.

The R45 was primarily targeted at learner drivers and some 28,000 of these were produced.

Tested by Bike magazine in 1979, the R45 recorded a top speed of 95 mph (153 km/h) while returning an overall fuel consumption of 56.2 mpg_{‑imp} (5.03 L/100 km; 46.8 mpg_{‑US}). Few changes were made to these smaller twins before production ceased in 1985.

Today the R45 is popular with custom bike builders and are being converted into Café Racer or Street scramblers due to their compact dimensions.

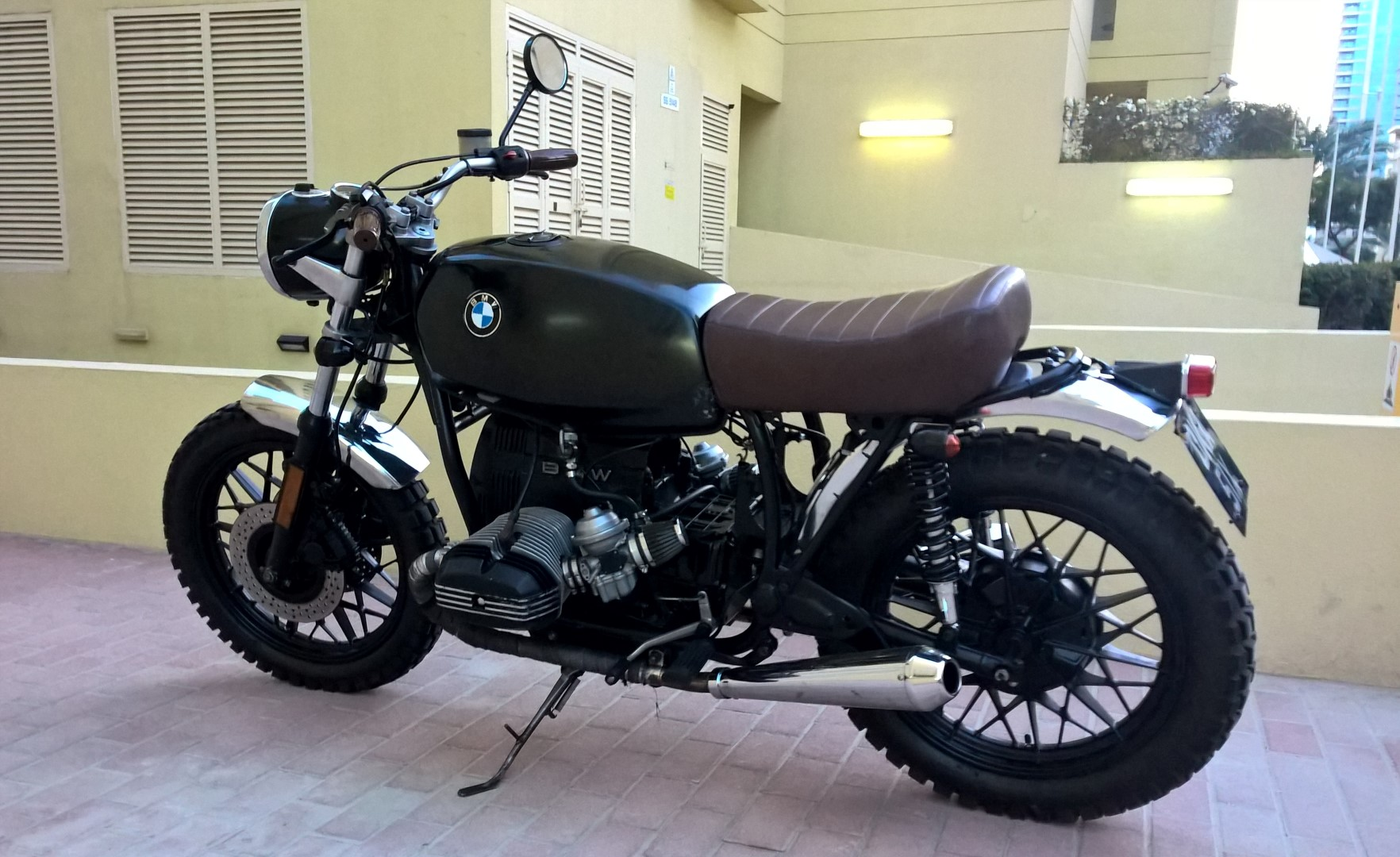
Modified BMW R45 1981

Engine

- Motor Type: Four-stroke two cylinder horizontally opposed "Boxer" engine, air cooled
- Bore x Stroke: 70 mm × 61.5 mm (2.76 in × 2.42 in)
- Displacement: 473.4 cc
- Max Power: 35 hp (26 kW) at 7,250 rpm or 27 hp (20 kW) at 6,500 rpm
- Max Torque: 37.5 Nm at 5,500 rpm or 31.3 Nm at 5000 rpm
- Compression Ratio: 9.2 : 1 or 8.2 : 1
- Valves Per Cylinder: 2
- Valve Control: OHV, using push rod and rocker arm
- Carburation System: 2 constant depression carburetors, Bing 64/28/303 - 64/28/304 or 64/26/303 - 64/326304
- Engine Lubricating System: Wet sump
