= List of vehicles of the Royal Malaysian Police =

This list identifies the police vehicles which are currently being operated or have formerly been operated by the Royal Malaysian Police.

== Land vehicles ==
=== Motorcycles ===
| Police vehicle | Type | In service | Notes |
Motorcycles
| Harley Davidson Low Rider ST (FXLRST) | Escort motorcycle | 2023 - Present | 8 units were given by Sabah State government.Used for escort VIP in Sabah. |
| Harley Davidson Electra Glide | Escort motorcycle | 2010 - Present | 8 units were given by Sultan Ibrahim of Johor to the PDRM Johor |
| BMW R1200RT | Escort motorcycle | | Several units were seen escorting the king. |
| BMW R1250 RT | Escort motorcycle | | 20 units of BMW R1250RT are procured in 2024. |
| BMW R1250 GS | Escort motorcycle | 2020 - Present | 24 units. Used by UTK |
| Honda CBX 750 | Patrol motorcycle | | Still in use but being replaced by the motorcycles mentioned below. |
| Honda CBX 350 | Patrol motorcycle | | |
| Honda VFR800 | Patrol motorcycle | | Used for traffic, patrol, pursuit, escort, interceptor (black bike with rider & pillion; black coloured, used by PGK counter-terrorist units). |
| Honda ST1300 | Patrol motorcycle | | |
| Yamaha FJR1300 | Patrol motorcycle | | Used for traffic, patrol, pursuit, escort, interceptor (black bike with rider & pillion; black coloured, used by PGK counter-terrorist units). |
| Kawasaki Ninja 250 | Patrol motorcycle | 2013–present | Community policing. |
| Kawasaki Ninja ZX-150RR | Patrol motorcycle | | |
| Kawasaki GTR | Patrol motorcycle | | Used for traffic, patrol, pursuit, escort, interceptor (black bike with rider & pillion; black coloured, used by PGK counter-terrorist units). |
| Kawasaki Honey 100 | Patrol motorcycle | | |
| Kawasaki KLR250 | Patrol motorcycle | | |
| Modenas Kriss | Patrol motorcycle | | |
| RTG Jebat F29 | Patrol motorcycle | 2026 - Present | Used for border patrol by GOF. As of August 2026, 10 were delivered out of 100 in Phase 1. Another 275 will be delivered as part of Phase 2. |

=== Mobile patrol vehicles ===
| Police vehicle | Type | In service | Notes |
Mobile patrol vehicles
| Mitsubishi Lancer Evolution X | Sports sedan | 2008–present | Delivered in December 2008. Known as Helang Lebuhraya Polis (Police Highway Eagle), these patrol car fleet are used by highway pursuit/patrol or VIP escort. |
| Mitsubishi Lancer 2.0 GTS | Sedan | 2010–present | Delivered in 2010. These patrol car fleet used along with Mitsubishi Lancer Evolution X by Highway Traffic Police. |
| Honda Civic (tenth generation) 1.8 | Sedan | 2020–present | Used as patrol car. |
| Honda Civic (eleventh generation) | Sedan | 2024-Present | Used as patrol car. |
| Honda Civic Type R | Hot Hatchback | 2019–present | Used for high-speed expressway patrol operations and VIP escorts. |
| Toyota Corolla Altis 1.8E | Sedan | 2020–present | Will replace Proton Wira and Proton Waja police cars. |
| Proton Preve | Sedan | 2013–2020 | Formerly used as patrol car and CID car. |
| Proton Inspira | Sedan | 2011–2025 | Used as patrol car. |
| Proton Waja | Sedan | 2000–2011 | Formerly used as patrol car. In 2008 replaced with Waja CPS. |
| Kia Forte | Sedan | 2011–present | Used by Bukit Aman and secret operation. |
| Volvo S80 | Sedan | 2008–present | Recently spotted on highways in Klang Valley. Used by Traffic Police for Escort. |
| Honda Civic Hybrid | Medium sedan | 2003–2016 | |
| Proton Perdana | Medium sedan | 1995–2015 | |
| Proton X70 1.8 | SUV | 2020–present | Delivered in July 2020. |
| Mitsubishi Pajero Sport 2.5 VGT | SUV | 2013–present | Delivered in 2013. Used by Bukit Aman and VIP escort. |
| Nissan X-Trail | SUV | 2000–present | Off-road & mountain patrol. Also used occasionally on street patrol and VIP duties. |
| Perodua Myvi | Compact | 2022–present | |
| Proton Putra | Coupe | 1990–2016 | |
| Proton Wira | Compact sedan | 1993–2010 | |
| Proton Iswara | Compact sedan | 1990–2011 | |
| Perodua Kancil | Super compact | 1996–2010 | |
| Perodua Kembara | 4x4 | 1999–2011 | |
| Toyota Land Cruiser | 4x4 | | |
| Mitsubishi Pajero | 4x4 | 1990–present | |
| Volvo 850 | Station wagon | 1992–2012 | Formerly used for highway patrol and pursuit. |
| Mazda CX-5 | SUV | | |
| Mitsubishi ASX | Crossover | 2018–present | Used for highway patrol and pursuit. |
| Mitsubishi Outlander | Crossover | 2018–present | Used for highway patrol and traffic police. |
| Perodua Bezza | Sedan | 2019 - Present | 3 units donated by Perodua as part of CSR program to Selangor Police. |

=== Special vehicles/VIP vehicles ===
| Police vehicle | Type | In service | Notes |
Special vehicles/VIP vehicles
| Proton Waja | Sedan | 2000–2011 | Former Patrol/pursuit, unmarked version used for VIP duties. |
| Proton Perdana V6 | Sedan | 2000–2011 | Formerly used on highway patrols/pursuits and VIP duties. |
| Honda Accord | VIP transport | 2000–present | VIP duties. Ordinary patrol versions in existence, though minimal. |
| Hyundai Sonata | VIP transport | 2009–present | VIP duties. Ordinary patrol versions in existence, though minimal. |
| Volvo XC90 | Special vehicle | 2000–present | VIP bodyguard duties. All in unmarked forms. |
| Honda CRV | VIP transport | 2000–present | VIP bodyguard duties. All in unmarked forms. |
| Ford Transit | Special vehicle | 2000–2009 | Used by the forensic investigation agencies and mobile police stations. |
| Hyundai Solati | Special vehicle | 2018–present | Used by the forensic investigation agencies and mobile police stations. |
| Isuzu D-Max | K9 unit | 2003–present | Used by the forensic investigation agencies and mobile police stations. |
| Toyota Hilux | K9 unit | 2008–present | Used by the forensic investigation agencies and mobile police stations. |
| Nissan Navara | | | |
| Ford Ranger | | | |

=== Transport vehicles ===
| Police vehicle | Type | In service | Notes |
Transport vehicles
| Isuzu WFR | Police van | | |
| Ford Econovan Diesel 12 seater | Police van | | |
| Kia Pregio | Police van | | |
| Land Rover Series | Transport vehicle | 1970–present | Some vehicles ended service in 1979, but some still used in small police stations. |
| Land Rover Defender | Transport vehicle | 1990–present | Used commonly for towing impounded vehicles. |
| Isuzu Elf | Police truck | | General purpose use. The famous use of this type of truck is Black Maria. |
| HICOM Handalan | Police truck | 1996–present | 4x4 general service 3 tonne truck. |
| HICOM Perkasa | Police truck | | Locally-made multi-purpose trucks. Used for carrying multiple arrested suspects or confiscation of large machinery. |
| Scania 6x6 Heavy Recovery Vehicle | Recovery vehicle | | Used commonly for towing vehicles. |
| KARBA | Aerial platform truck | 2018–present | |

=== Armored vehicles/paramilitary vehicles ===
| Police vehicle | Type | In service | Notes |
Armored vehicles/paramilitary vehicles
| Commando V-150D (4x4) | Armored personnel carrier | 1972–present | 138 units. The vehicle in service may be less. Equipped with M60 machine guns, used by GOF in urban and jungle warfare. |
| GKN Sankey AT105/Saxon (4x4) | Armored personnel carrier | 1978–present | 44 units. The vehicle in service may be less. Equipped with M60 machine guns and grenade launchers. Used in urban and jungle warfare. |
| Ferret Scout Car (4x4) | Scout car | 1990–present | Equipped with light machine gun and grenade launchers. Used as patrol, light assault vehicles, escort and interceptor in urban and jungle warfare. |
| IAG Guardian (4x4) | Mine Resistant Ambush Protected (MRAP) | | 4 units under General Operations Forces. Received in 2025. |
| IAG Jaws (4x4) | Mine Resistant Ambush Protected (MRAP) | 2015–present | 15 units. |
| Streit Typhoon (4x4) | Mine Resistant Ambush Protected (MRAP) | 2014–present | 2 units. |
| Shinjeong S-5/Barracuda (4x4) | Armored patrol vehicle | 2009–present | 4 units. |
| Shorland S51 & S55 (4x4) | Armored patrol vehicle | 1983–present | 20 units. |
| Mercedez Benz Unimog | Troop transport | | Used by GOF. |
| Mercedez Benz 911 | Troop transport | | Used by GOF. |
| Polaris RZR | ATV/buggy | | 10 units. |

== Marine vehicles ==
See also: Marine Operations Force.

| Vessel | Type | In service | Notes |
Vessel
| Labuan Shipyard and Engineering PTV 57M | Patrol / transport vessel | 2 | 57 meter patrol / transport vessel armed with 20 mm RWS and 12.7 mm machine gun. |
| Gading Marine FAC PC 31 | Patrol craft | 2 | 18 meter patrol craft armed with 12.7 mm machine gun and 7.62 mm machine gun. |
| Geliga Slipway / Marine Alutech Watercat 2000 | Patrol craft | 5 | 19 meter patrol craft built by local company using Marine Alutech Watercat 2000 design. |
| Marine Alutech Watercat M14 | Patrol craft | 10 | |
| Penyengat patrol craft | Patrol craft | Unknown | |
| PA patrol craft | Patrol craft | Unknown | |
| PC patrol craft | Patrol craft | Unknown | |
| PS patrol craft | Patrol craft | Unknown | |
| PT patrol craft | Patrol craft | Unknown | |
| PX patrol craft | Patrol craft | Unknown | |
| PZ patrol craft | Patrol craft | Unknown | |
| PAR patrol craft | Patrol craft | Unknown | |
| PGR patrol craft | Patrol craft | Unknown | |
| PLC patrol craft | Patrol craft | Unknown | |
| PSB patrol craft | Patrol craft | Unknown | |
| PSC patrol craft | Patrol craft | Unknown | |
| Ibrahim IC 1170 | Patrol craft | 1 | |
| Rigid hull assault boat | Assault boat | 10 | Armed with Vektor SS-77. |
| Humdinga amphibious vehicles | Amphibious vehicle | 6 | |

== Air vehicles ==
See also: Royal Malaysian Police Air Wing Unit.

| Aircraft | Type | Versions | In service | Notes |
Fixed wings
| Cessna 208 Caravan | Medium civil transport aircraft | Cessna 208 Caravan | 6 | 9M-PSL, 9M-PSM, 9M-PSN, 9M-PSO, 9M-PSP, 9M-PSQ |
| Pilatus PC-6 Porter | Light civil transport aircraft | Pilatus PC-6/B2-H4 Turbo Porter | 5 | 9M-PSE, 9M-PSG, 9M-PSH, 9M-PSI, 9M-PSK 9M-PSJ crashed on 17/5/1989 at Kuala Lumpur. 9M-PSF crashed on 15/11/1991 at Sabah. |
| Beechcraft Super King Air | Air surveillance / medium transport aircraft | Beechcraft Super King Air 350i | 5 | 9M-PTA, 9M-PTB, 9M-PTC, 9M-PTD, 9M-PTE |
Helicopters
| Eurocopter AS355 Écureuil 2 | Utility helicopter | AS355 F2 (2 units initially) AS355 N (9 units initially) | 9 | 9M-PHG, 7/7/2010 crashed near Telaga Air, Sarawak. Repaired and crashed again in 10/7/2025. 9M-PHD, 31/12/2014 crashed at Kampung Rambai, Tanah Merah, Kelantan. |
| AgustaWestland AW139 | Utility helicopter | AW139 | 5 | 9M-PMA, 9M-PMB, 9M-PMC, 9M-PMD, 9M-PME, 9M-PMF 9M-PMC crashed on 28/02/2020 at Tawau, Sabah. |
| AgustaWestland AW149 | Utility helicopter | AW149 | 0+(7) | 7 on order. |
Unmanned aerial vehicles
| DJI Mavic | Unmanned aerial vehicle | | 157+ | More than 157 units in service. |

== Retired equipments ==
| Police vehicle | Type | In service | Notes |
Mobile patrol vehicle
| Proton Saga Megavalve | Compact hatchback | 1990–1999 | Ended service in 1999, but still used in some rural police stations. |
| Alfa Romeo Giulia | Compact sedan | 1970–1979 | Ended service in 1979. |
| Alfa Romeo Alfetta | Compact sedan | 1970–1979 | Ended service in 1979. |
| Volvo 144 | Small sedan | 1970–1979 | Ended service in 1979. |
| Volvo 340 | Compact hatchback | 1980–1992 | Ended service in 1992. |
| Mitsubishi Galant | Sedan | 1985–1995 | Ended service in 1995. |
| Daihatsu Charmant | Sedan | 1980–1989 | Ended service in 1989. |
| Proton Saga | Compact hatchback | 1985–1989 | Ended service in 1999, some serve in rural police stations before being retired. |
| Isuzu Trooper | SUV | 1980–1989 | Ended service in 1989. |
| Volvo 240 | Compact sedan | 1985–1995 | Ended service in 1995. |
| Volvo 740 | Station wagon | 1980–1989 | Ended service in 1989. |
Special vehicles/VIP vehicles
| Ford Cortina Wagon | K9 unit | 1977–1983 | Ended service in 1983. |
| Ford Transit Minibus | Van/ambulance | 1965–1990 | Used as utility transport. |
| Inokom Permas | Special vehicle | 2000–2018 | Used by the forensic investigation agencies and mobile police stations. |
Transport vehicles
| Ford D Series | Police truck | Withdrawn from services in 1993 | Troop carrier/Black Maria |
| Ford Thames Trader | Police truck | Withdrawn from services in 1980 | Troop carrier/Black Maria |
Fixed wings
| Cessna 172 Skyhawk | Civil utility aircraft | Discontinued | Cessna Skyhawk 172S |
| Cessna 206 | Civil transport aircraft | Discontinued | Cessna U206G Stationair |

== Gallery ==
Honda VFR800

Honda ST13000

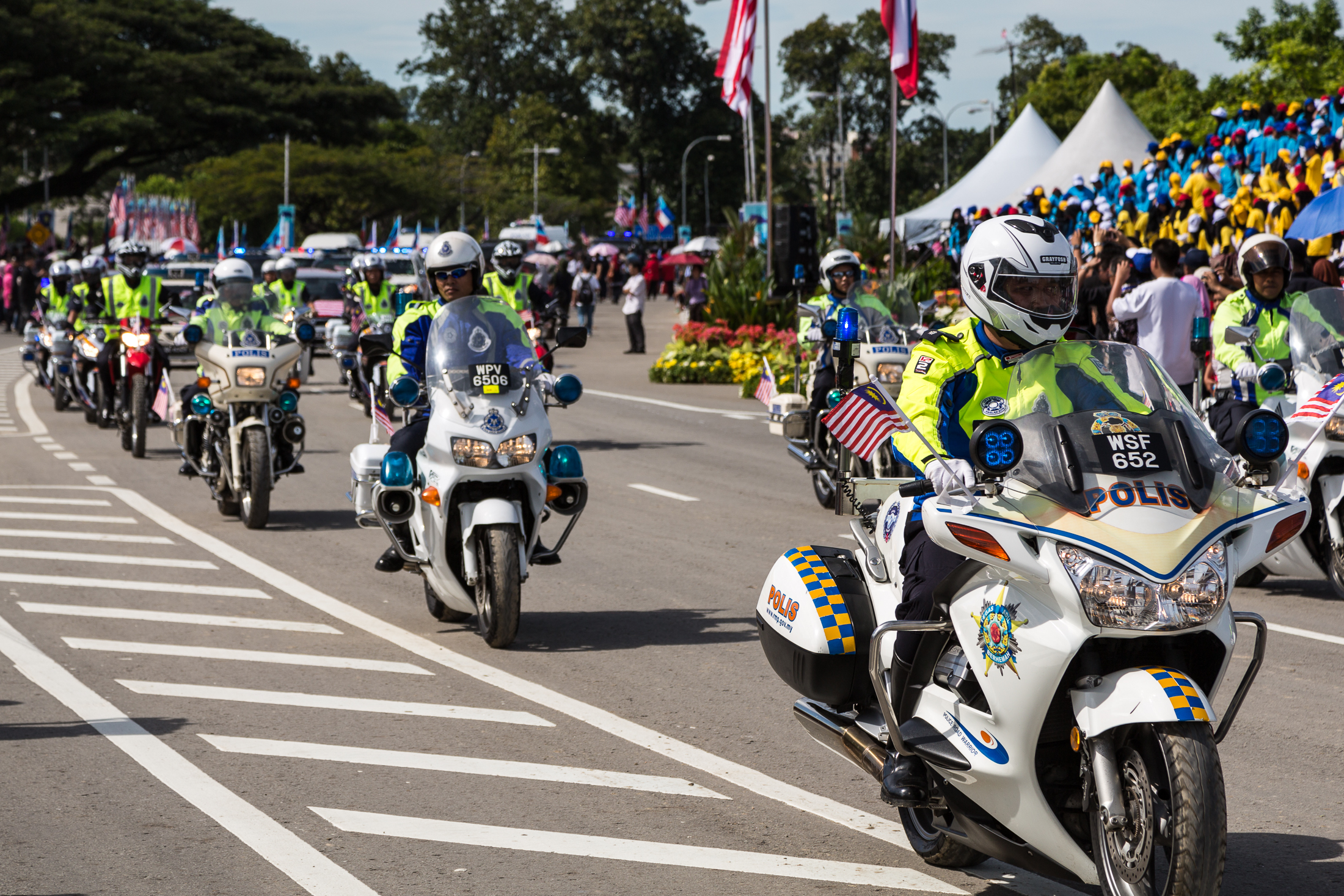
RMP motorcycles

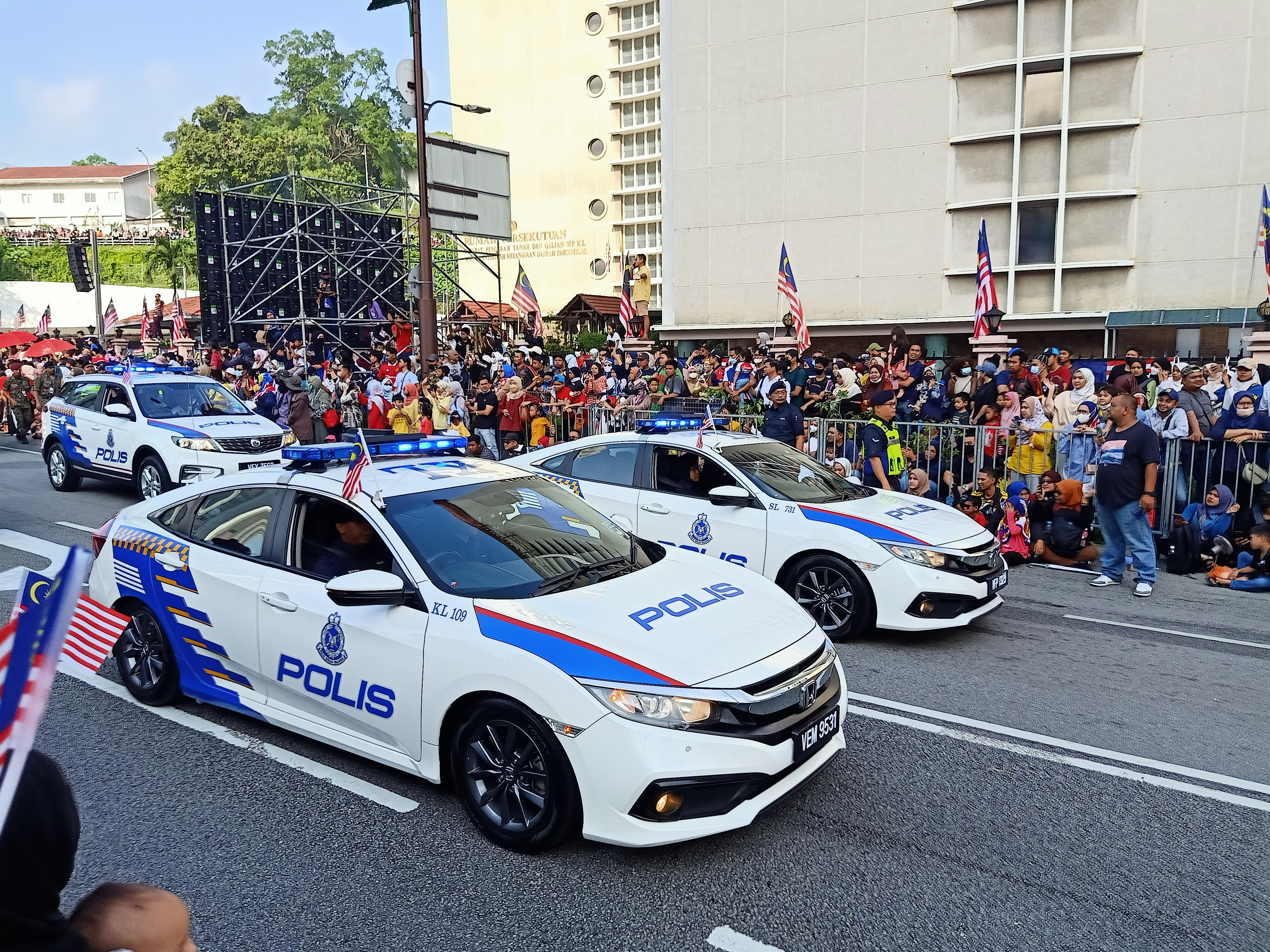
Honda Civic 1.8S

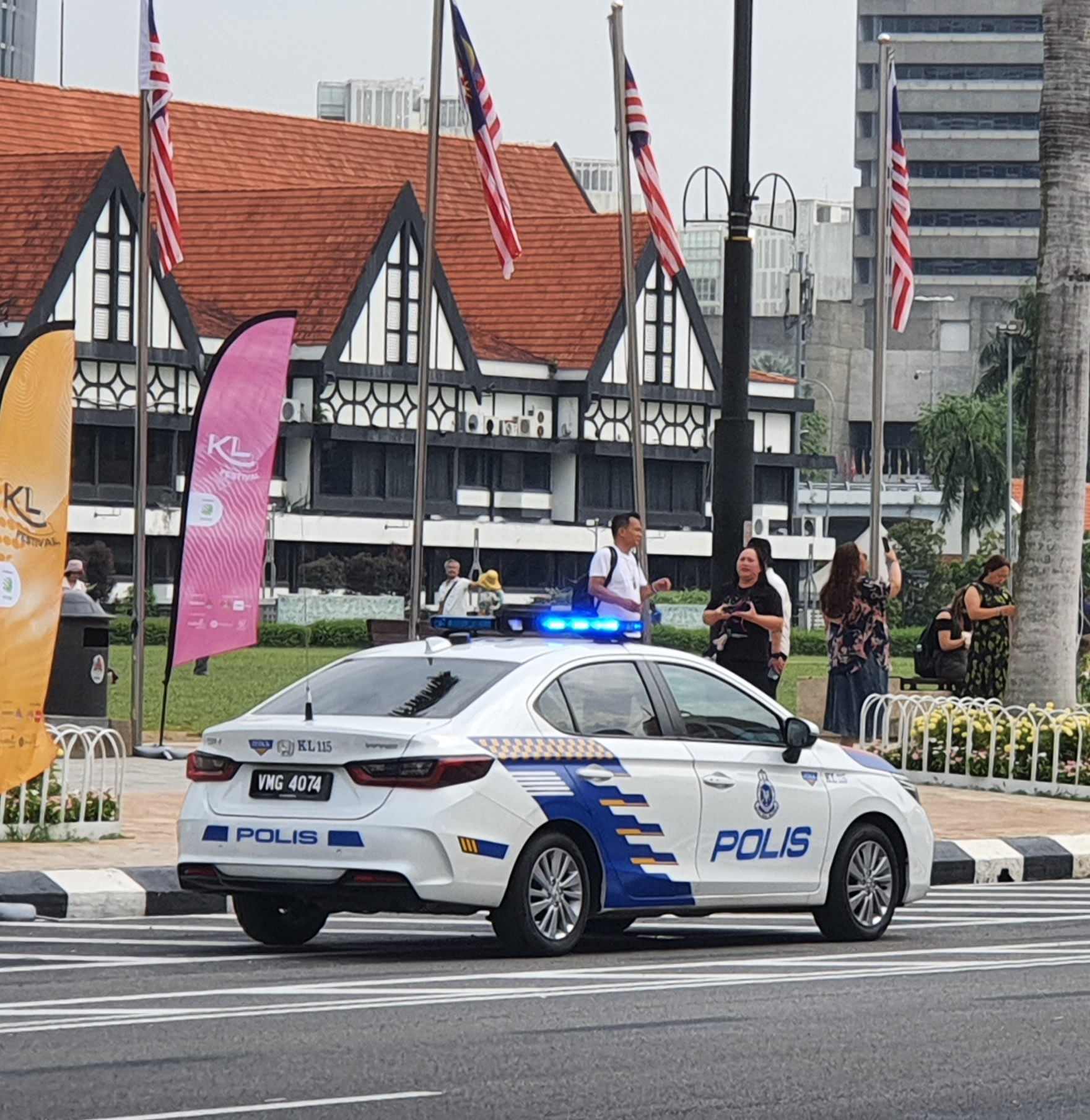
Honda City

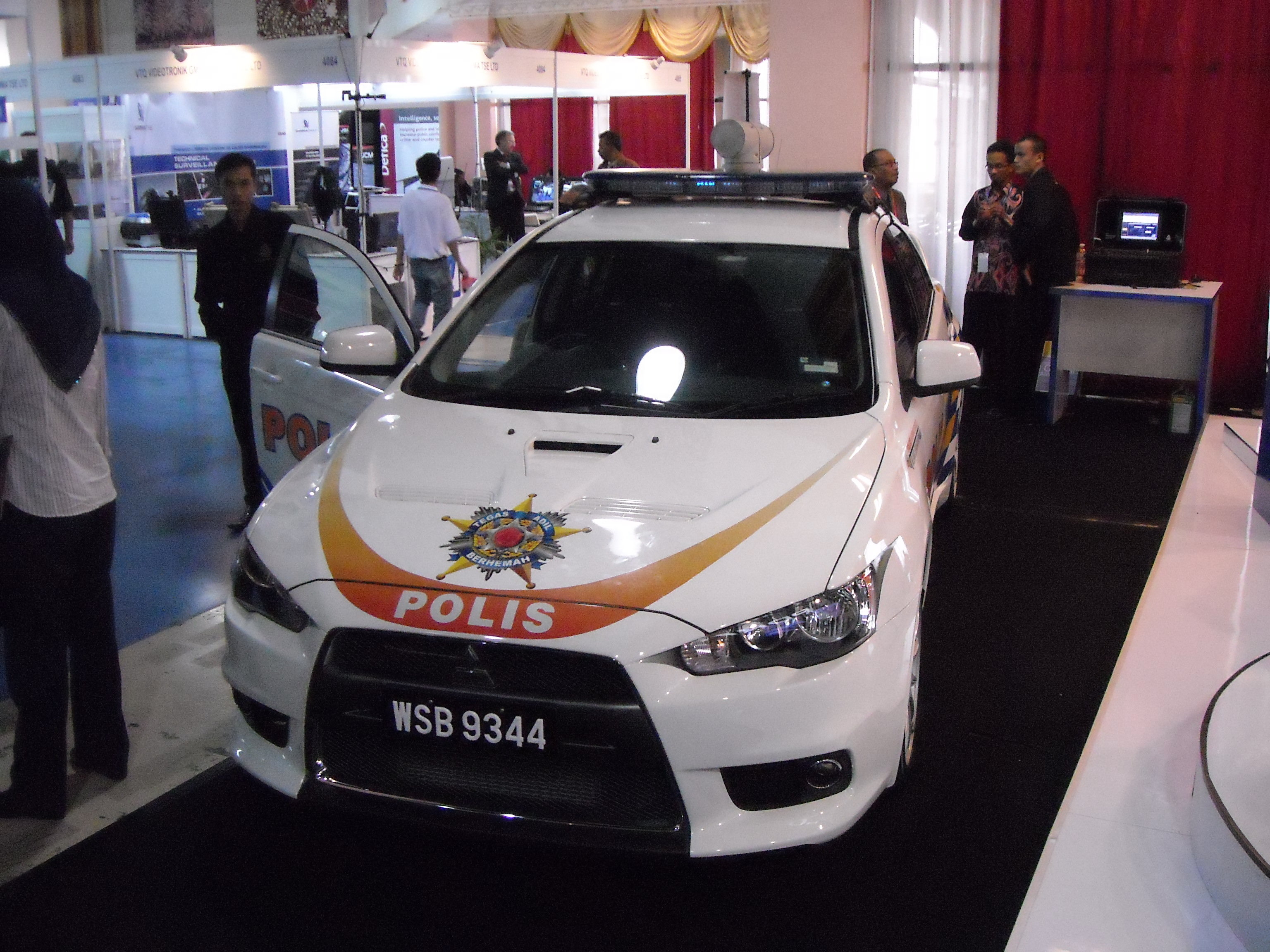
Mitsubishi Lancer Evolution X

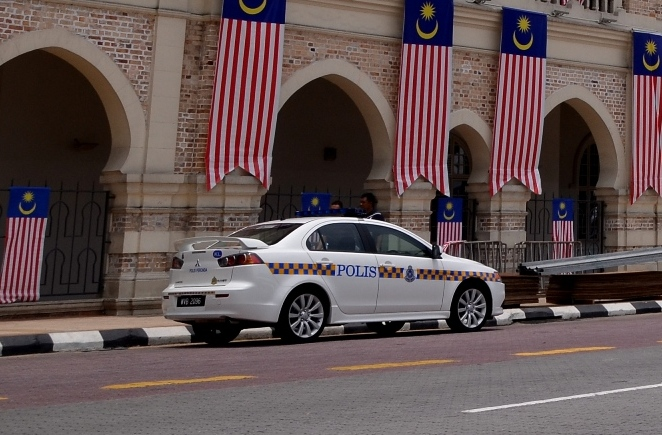
Mitsubishi Lancer

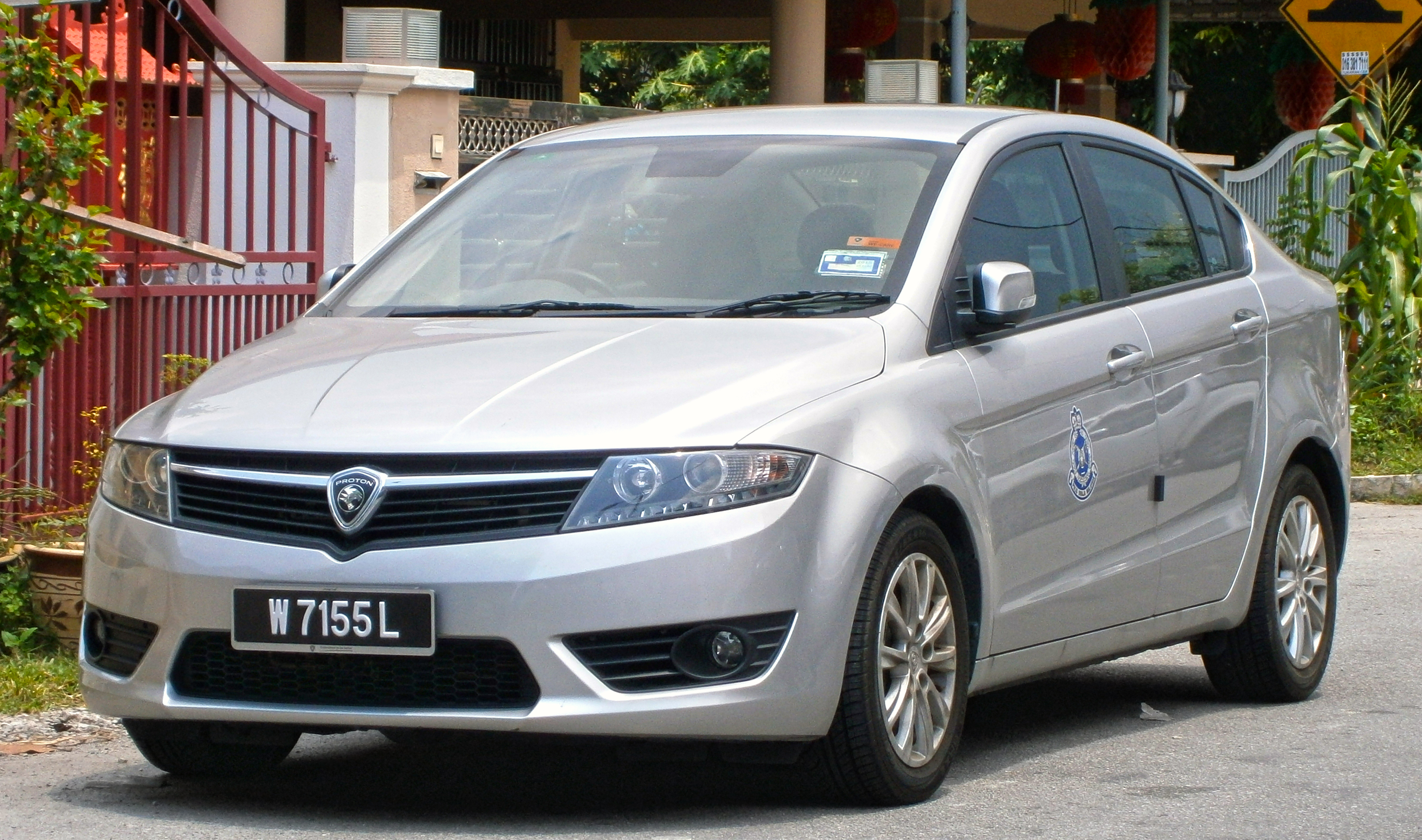
Proton Preve

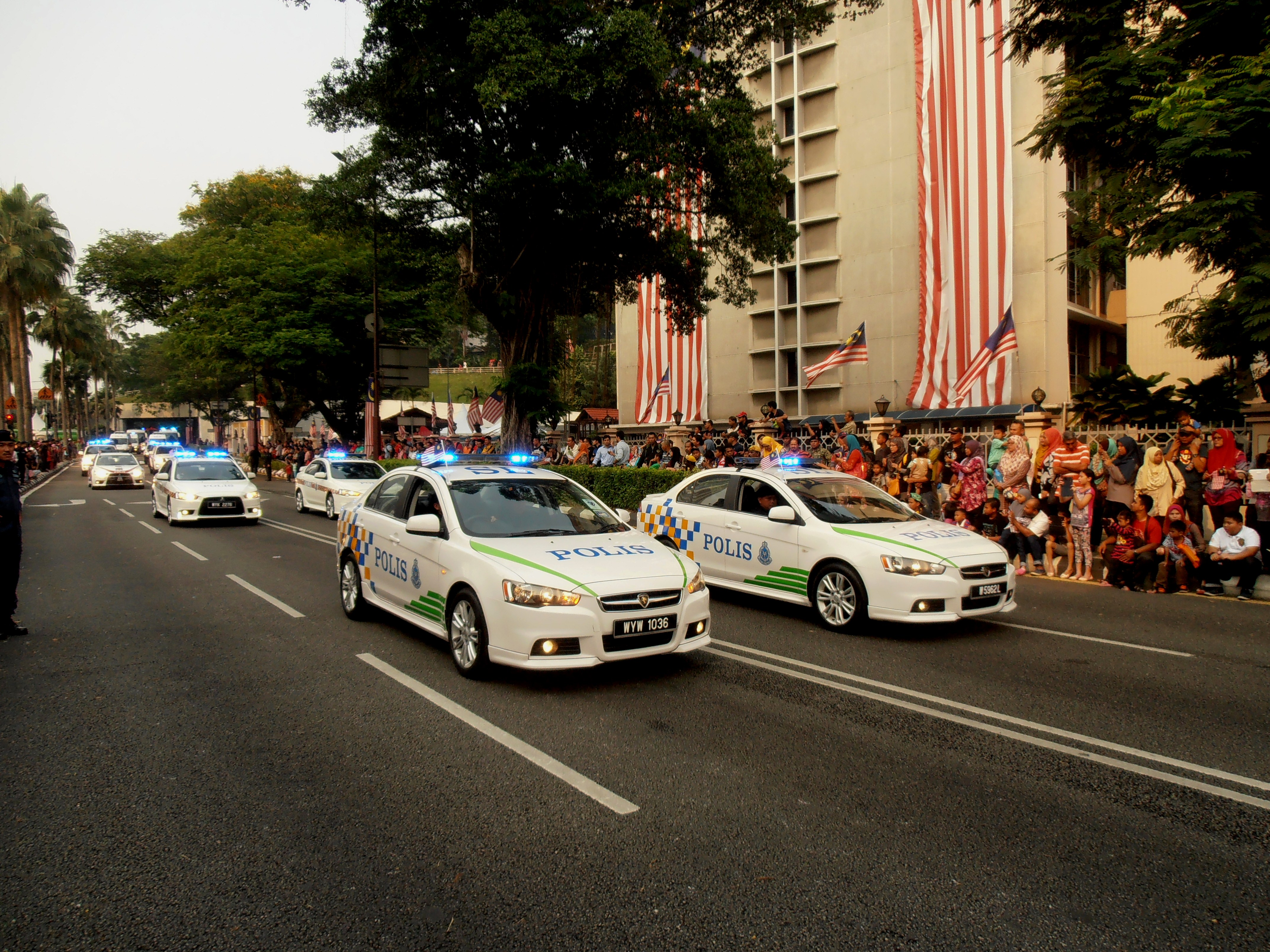
Proton Inspira

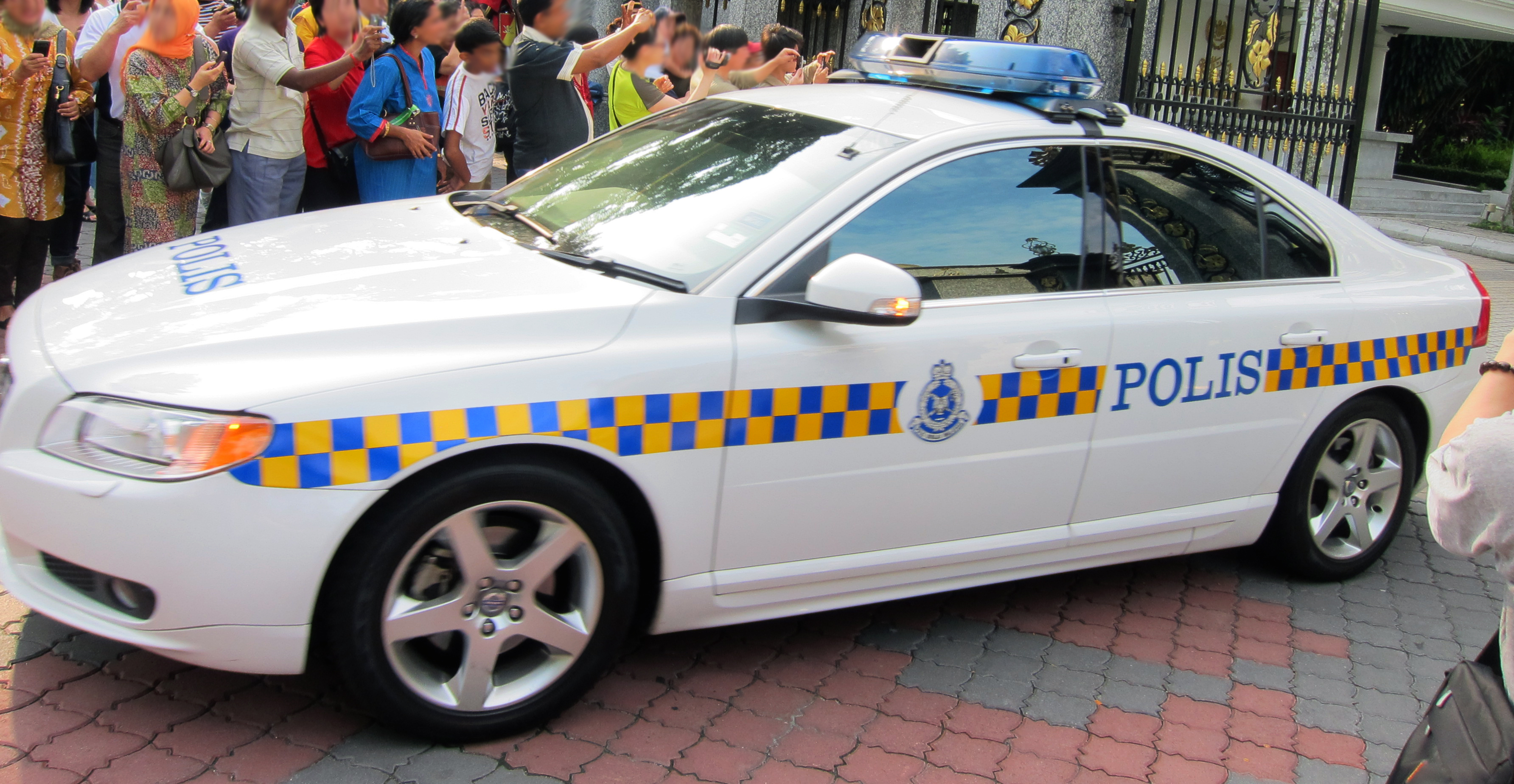
Volvo S80

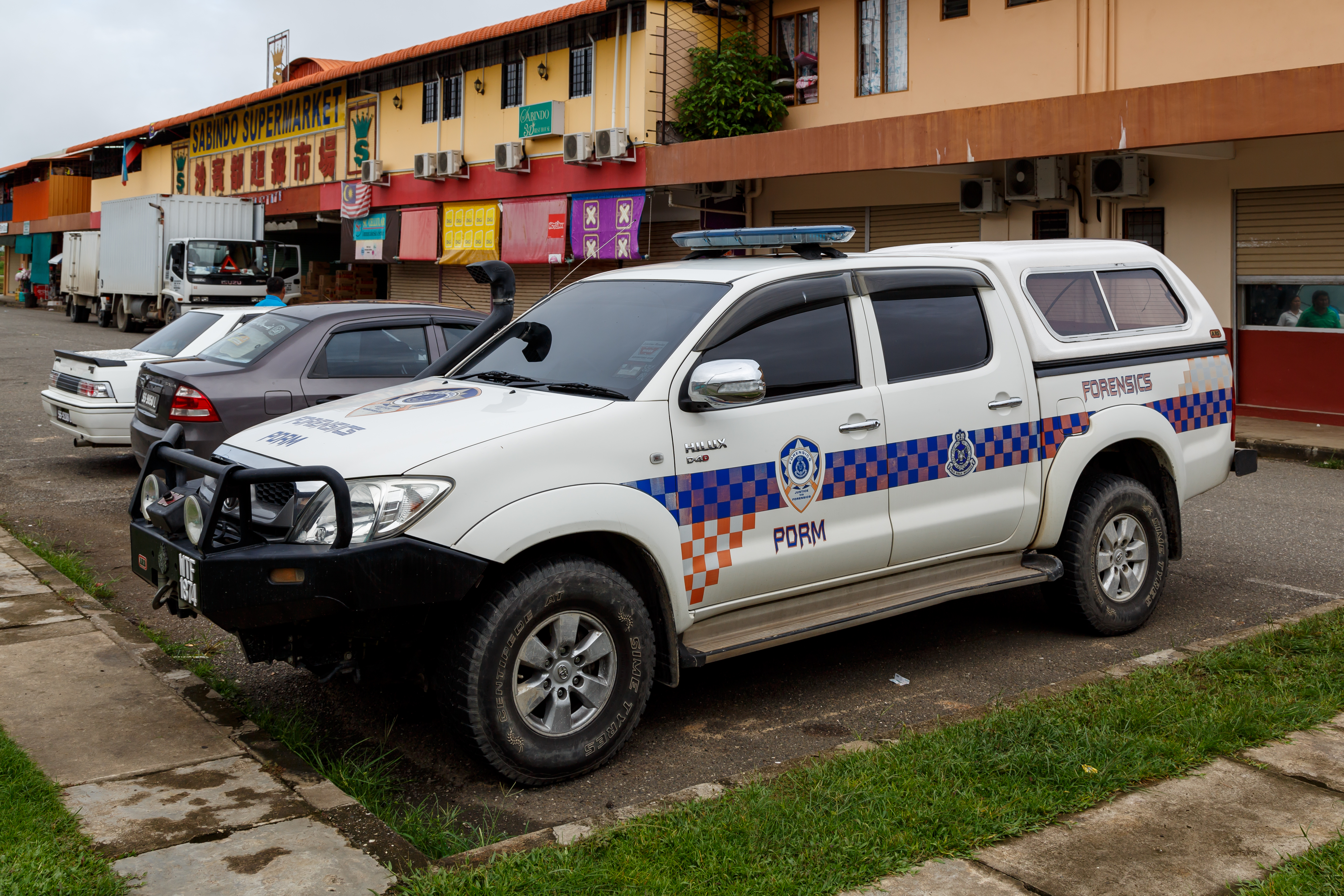
Toyota Hilux

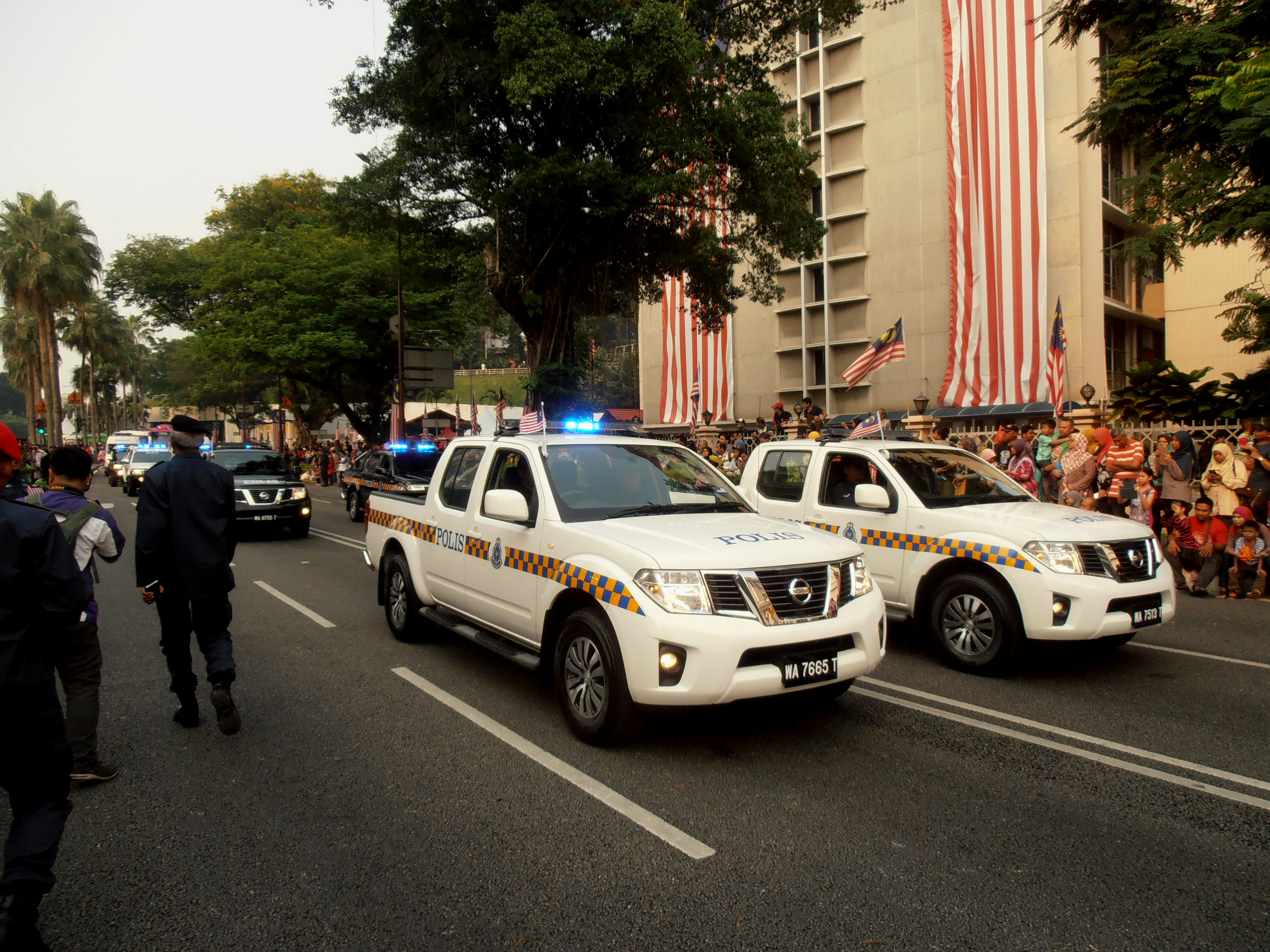
Nissan Navara

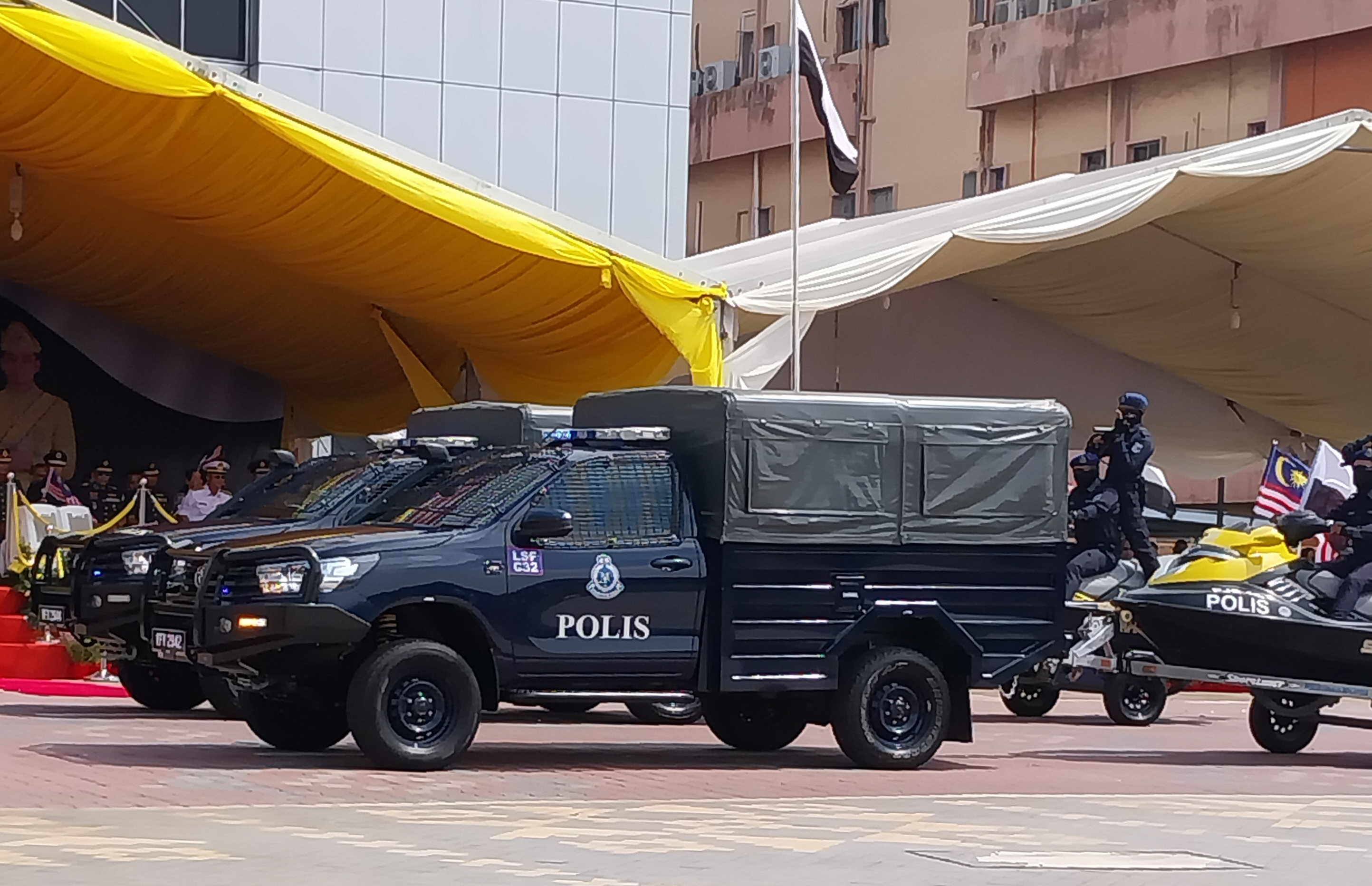
Toyota Hilux

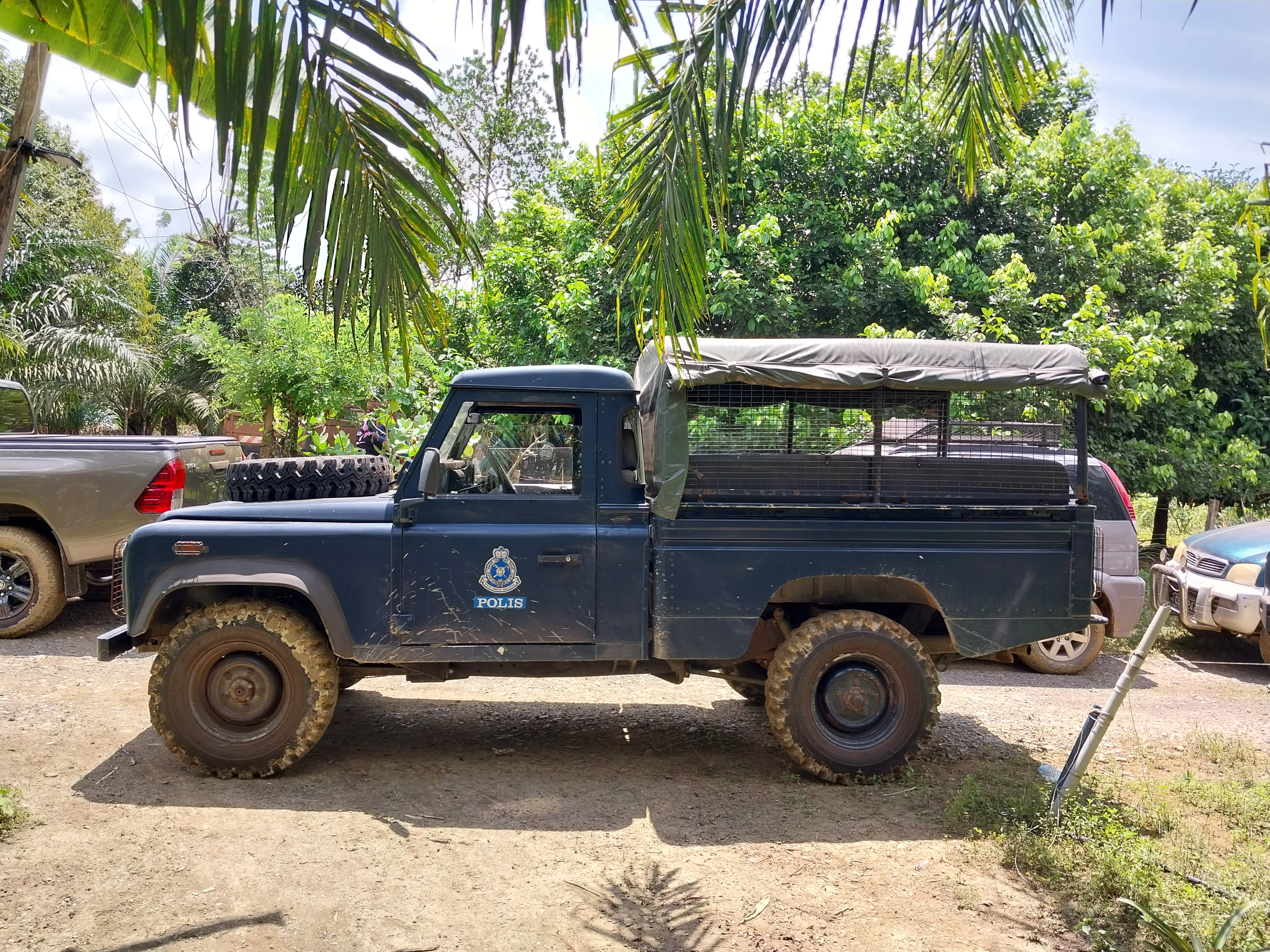
Land Rover Defender

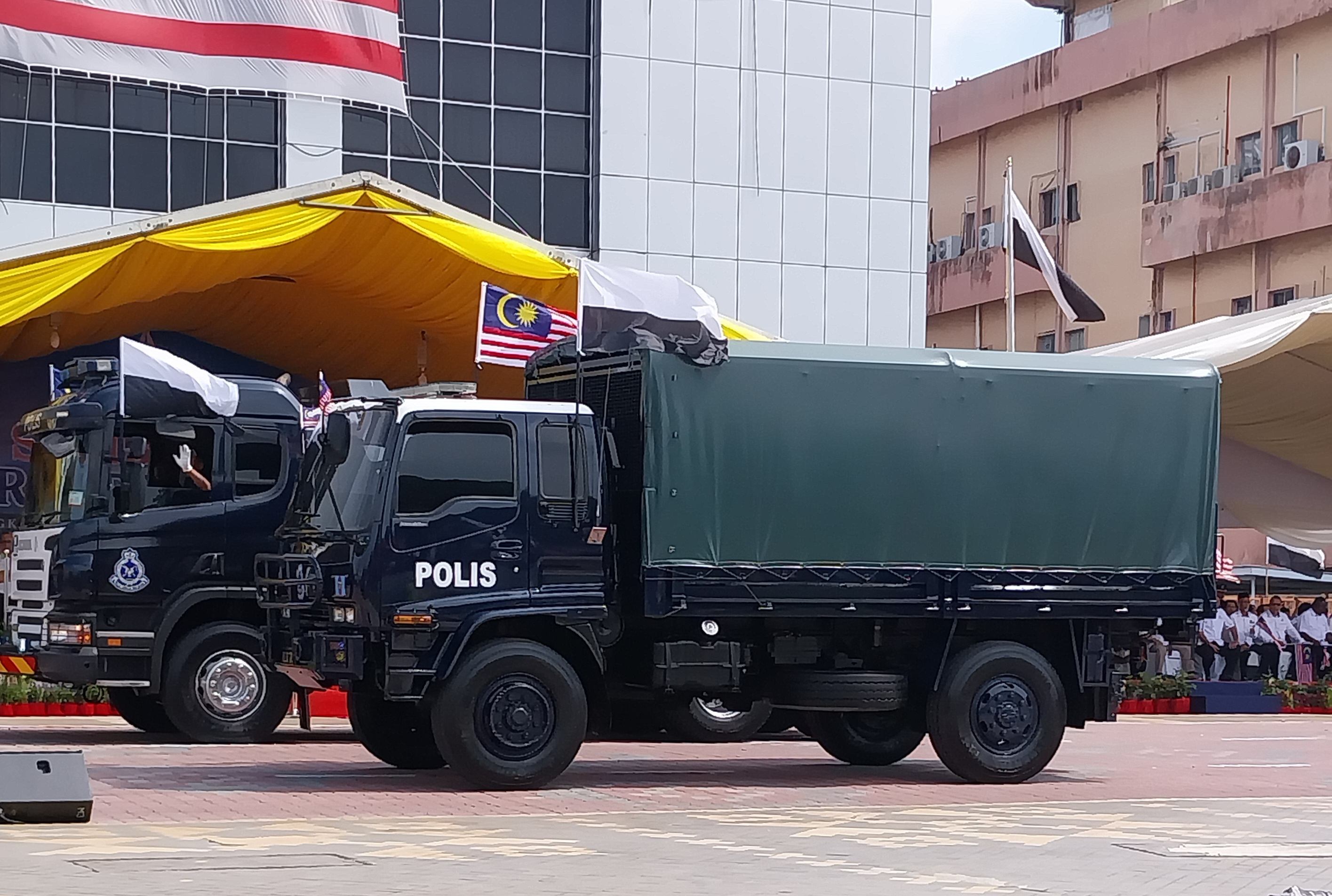
Handalan truck

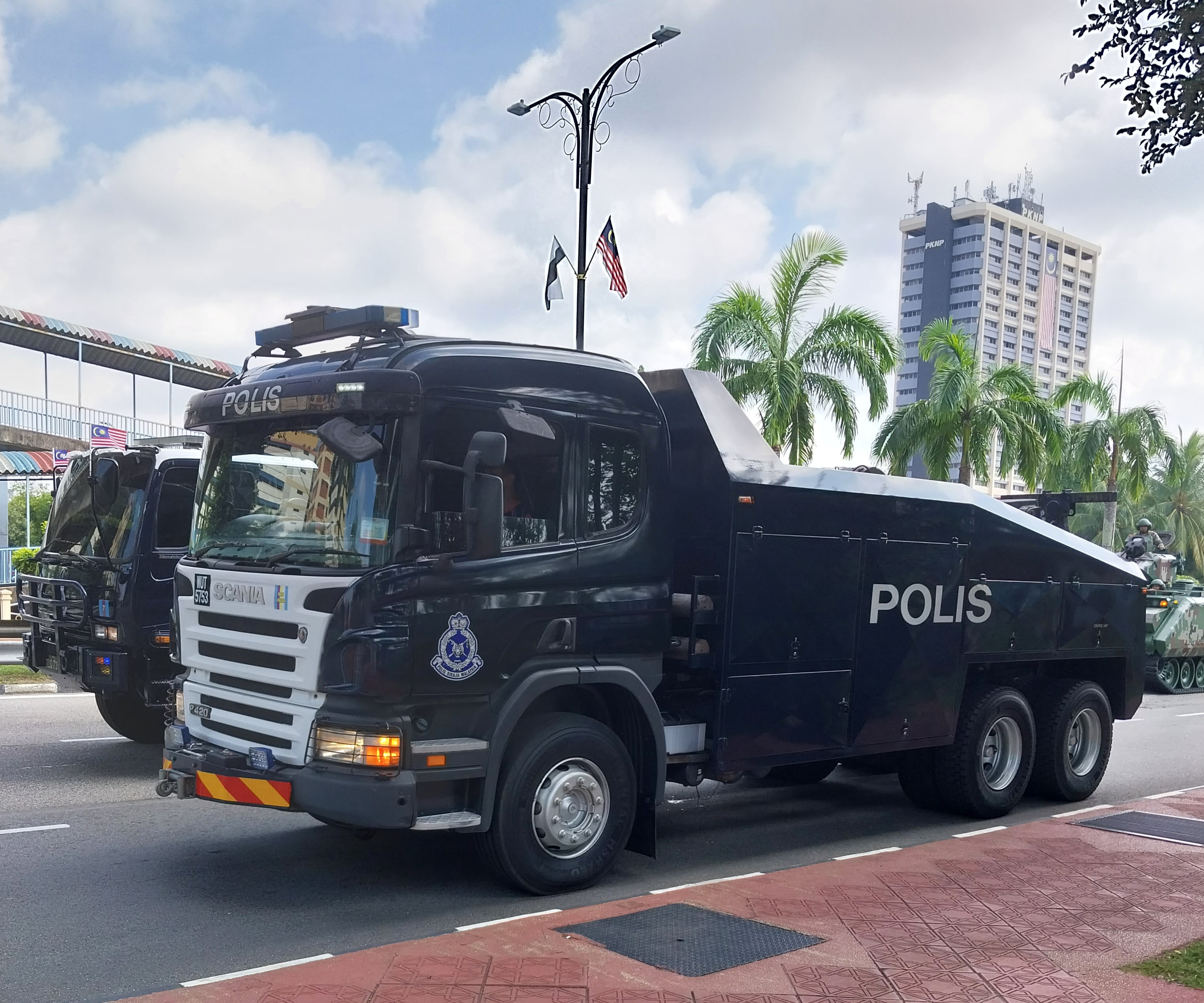
Scania heavy recovery vehicle

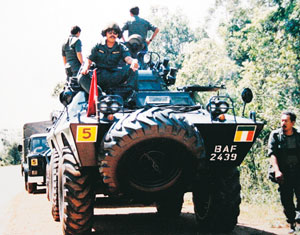
Commando V-150 armoured car

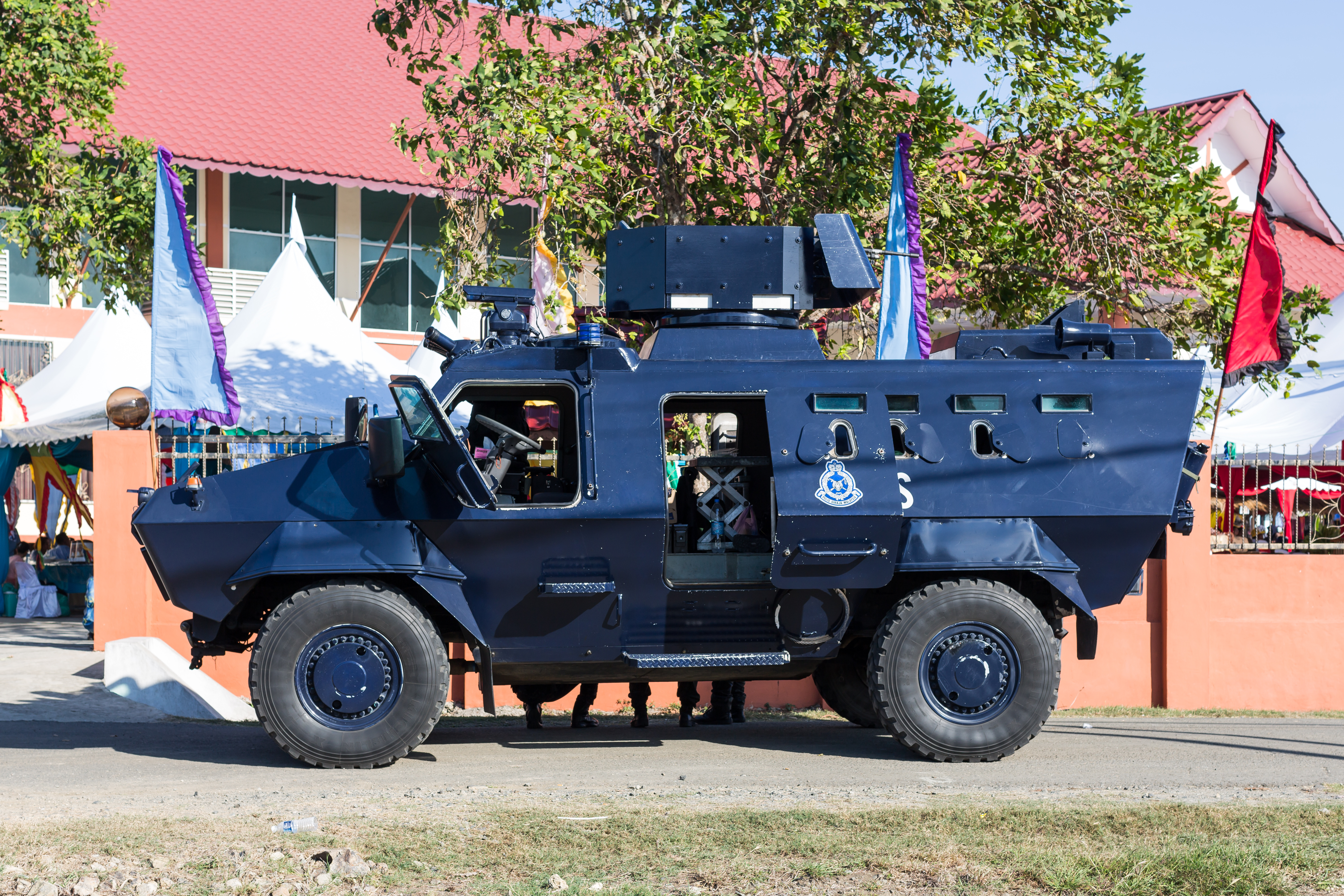
Shinjeong S-5 / Barracuda armoured car

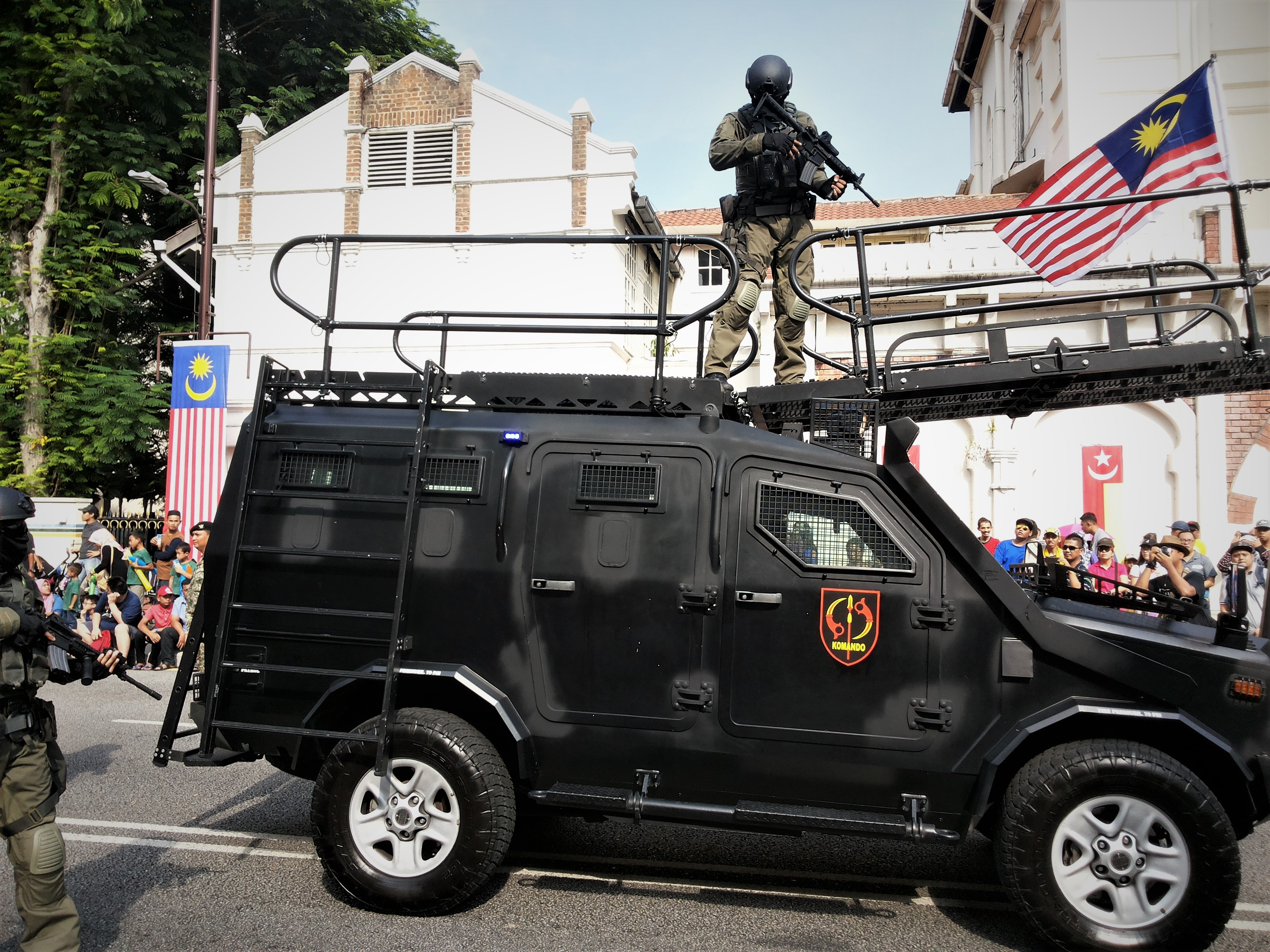
IAG Jaws with 69 Commandos

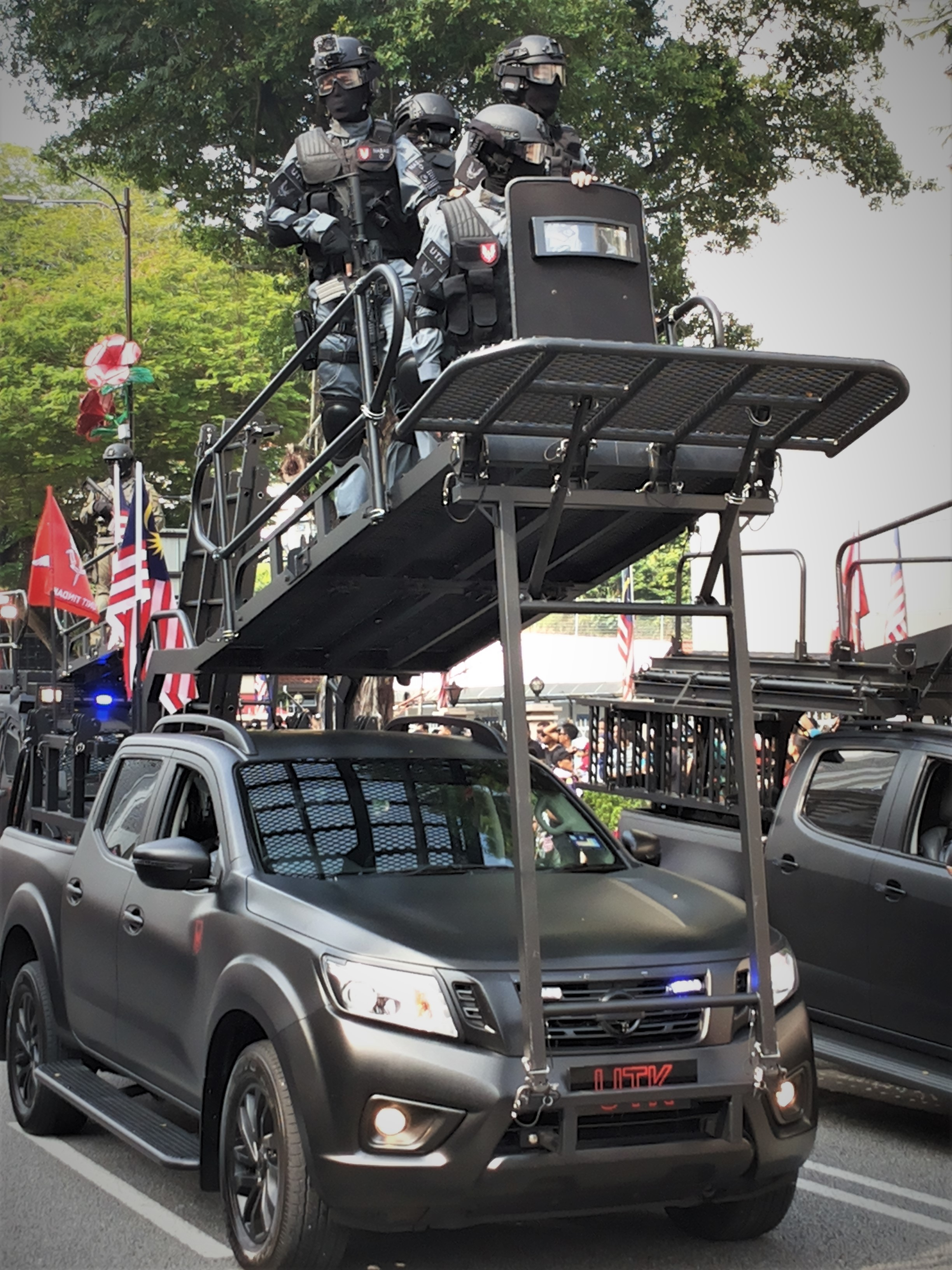
Officers from the Special Actions Unit of Royal Malaysia Police on 4x4 pickup

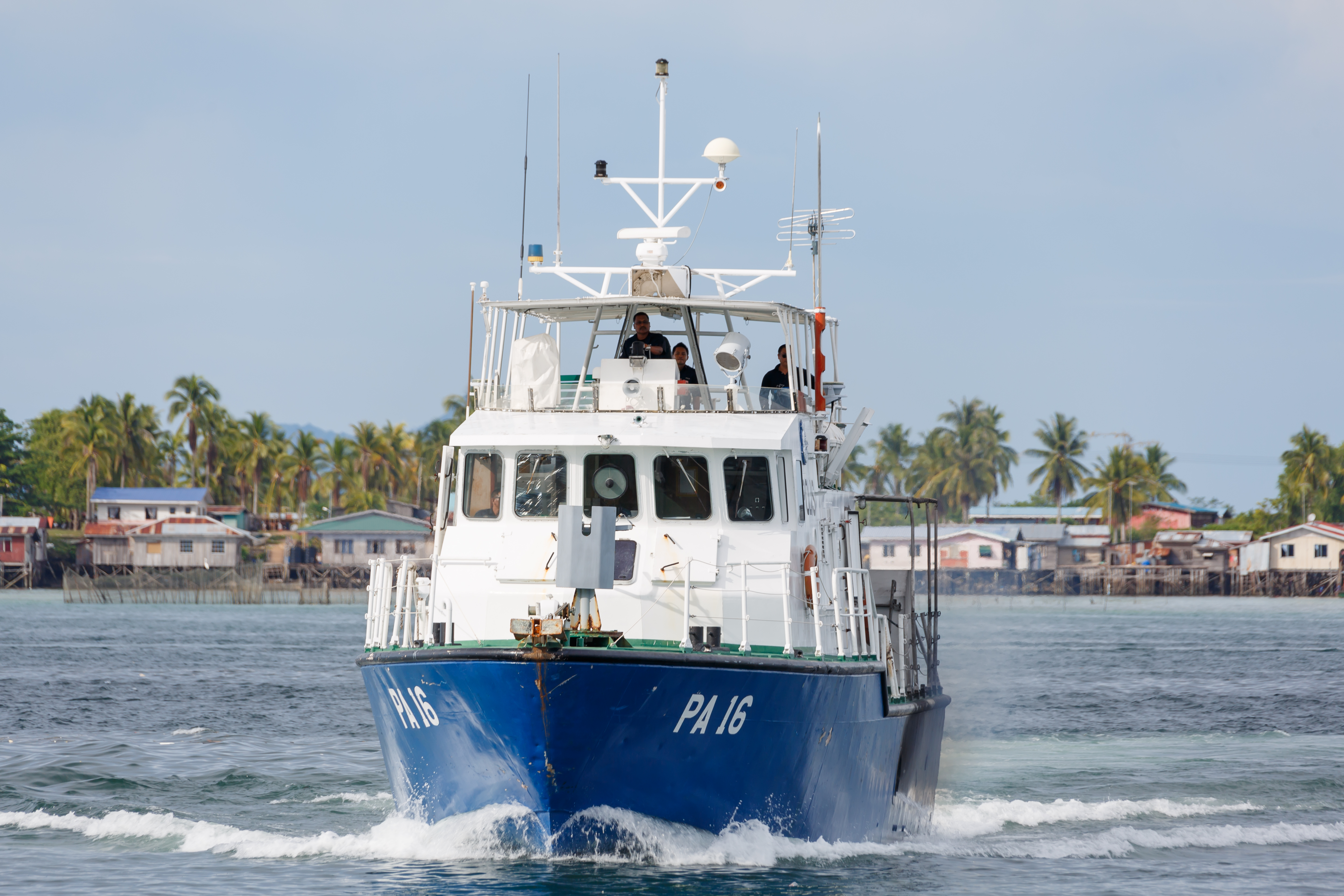
PA-class patrol craft

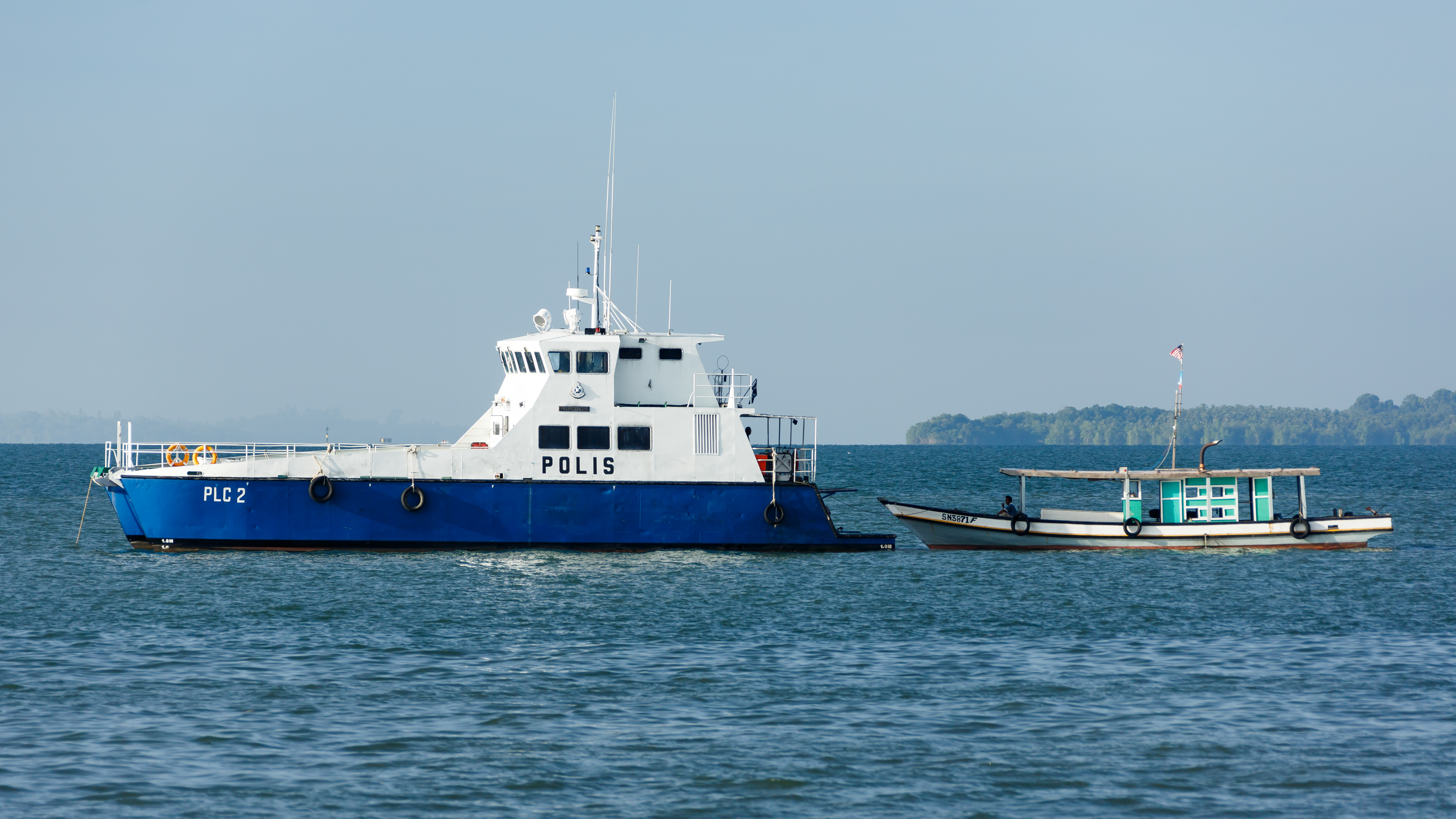
PLC-class patrol craft

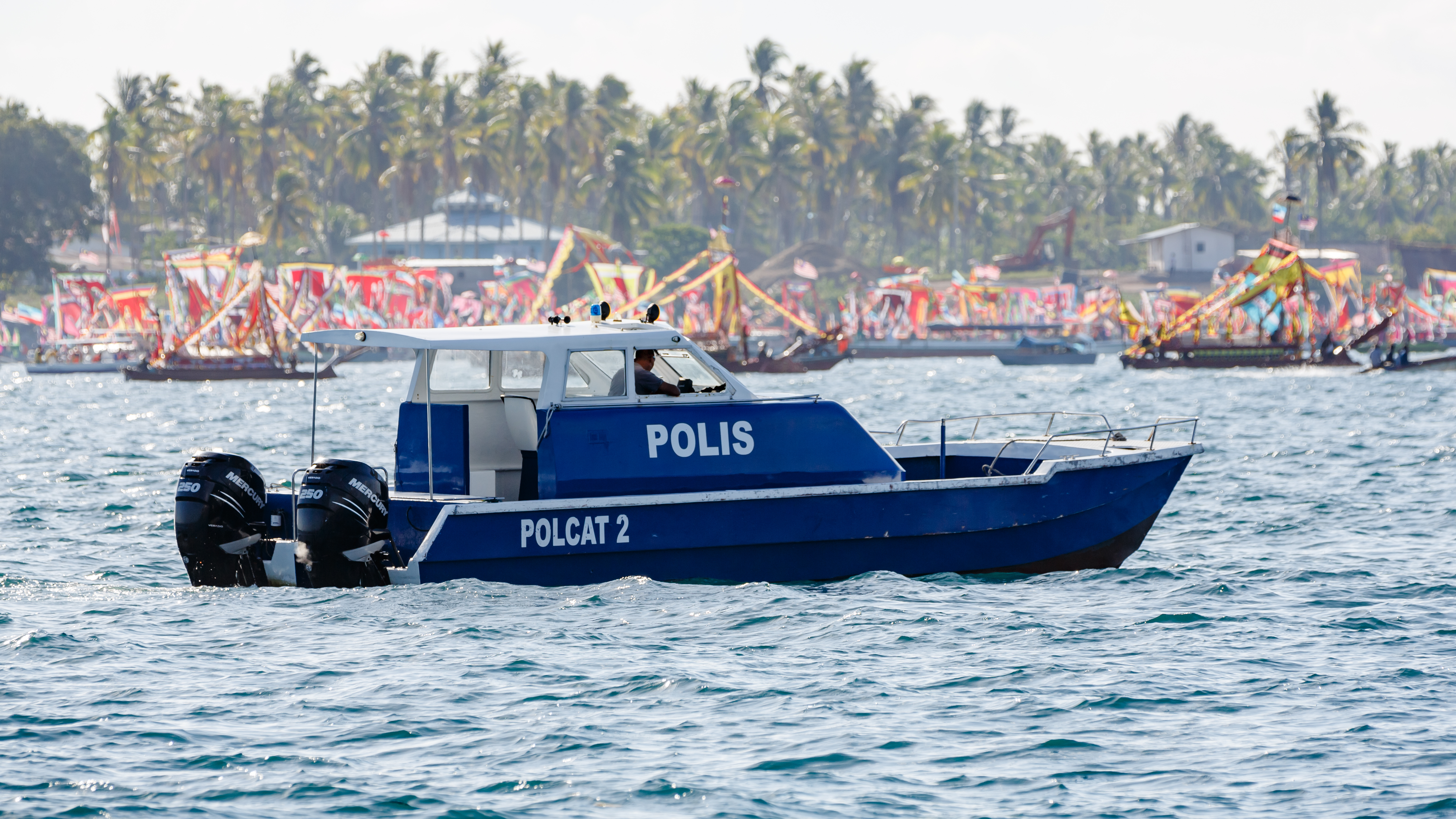
RMP boat

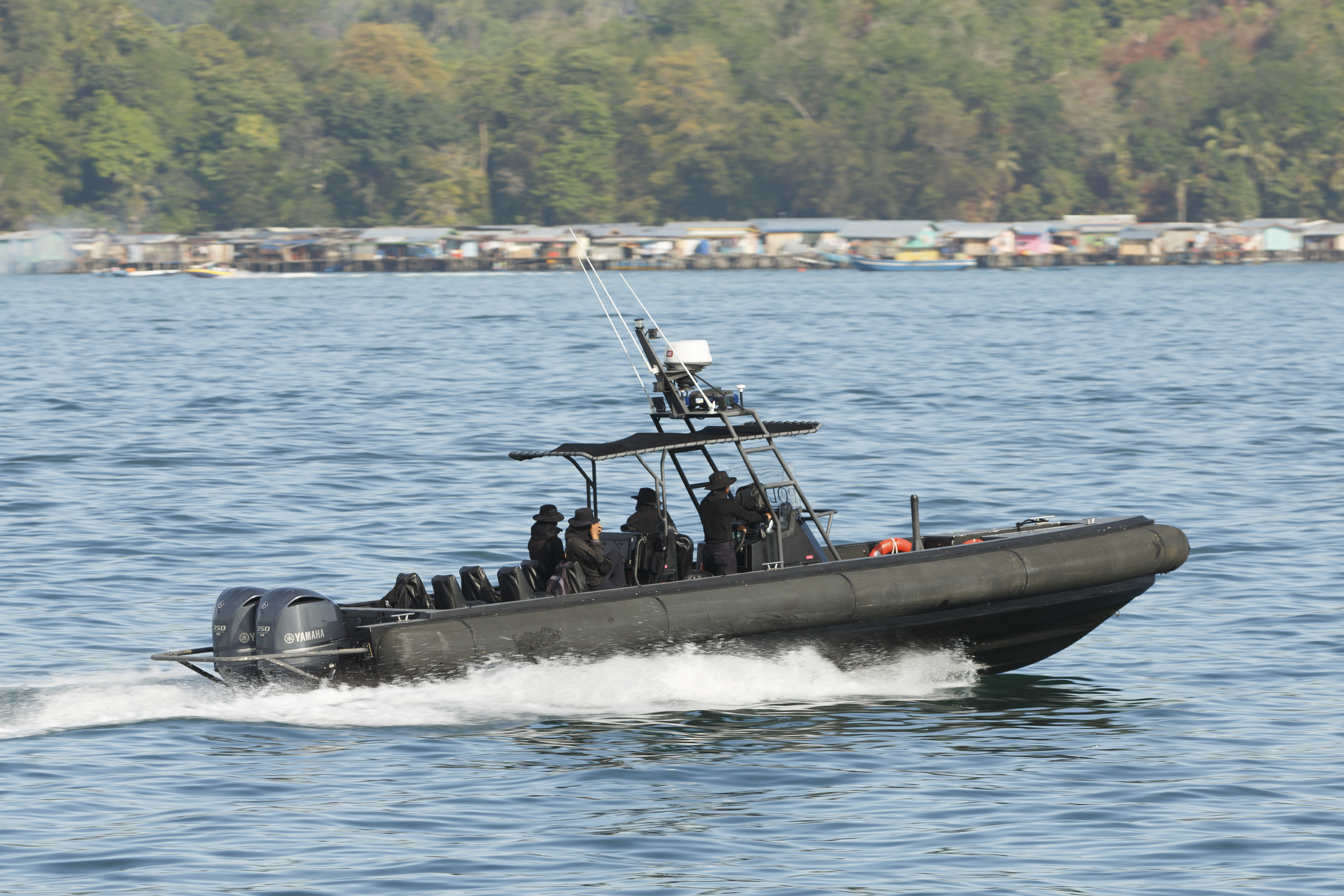
RHIB

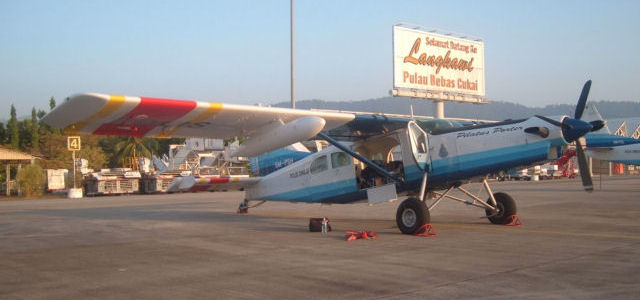
Pilatus PC-6 Porter

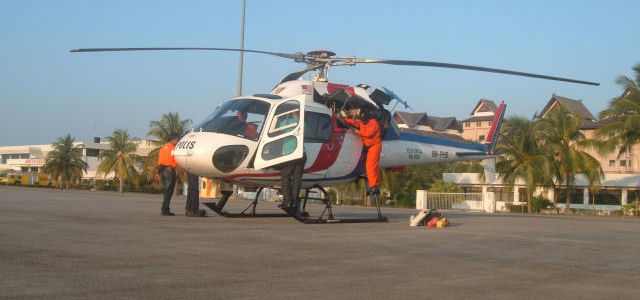
Eurocopter AS355 Écureuil 2

== Sources ==
- Royal Malaysian Police (RMP), Bukit Aman, Kuala Lumpur

== See also ==
- List of equipment of the Malaysian Army
- List of equipment of the Royal Malaysian Navy
- List of equipment of the Royal Malaysian Air Force
- List of aircraft of the Malaysian Armed Forces
- List of equipment of the Malaysian Maritime Enforcement Agency
- List of police firearms in Malaysia
