= GG Quadster =

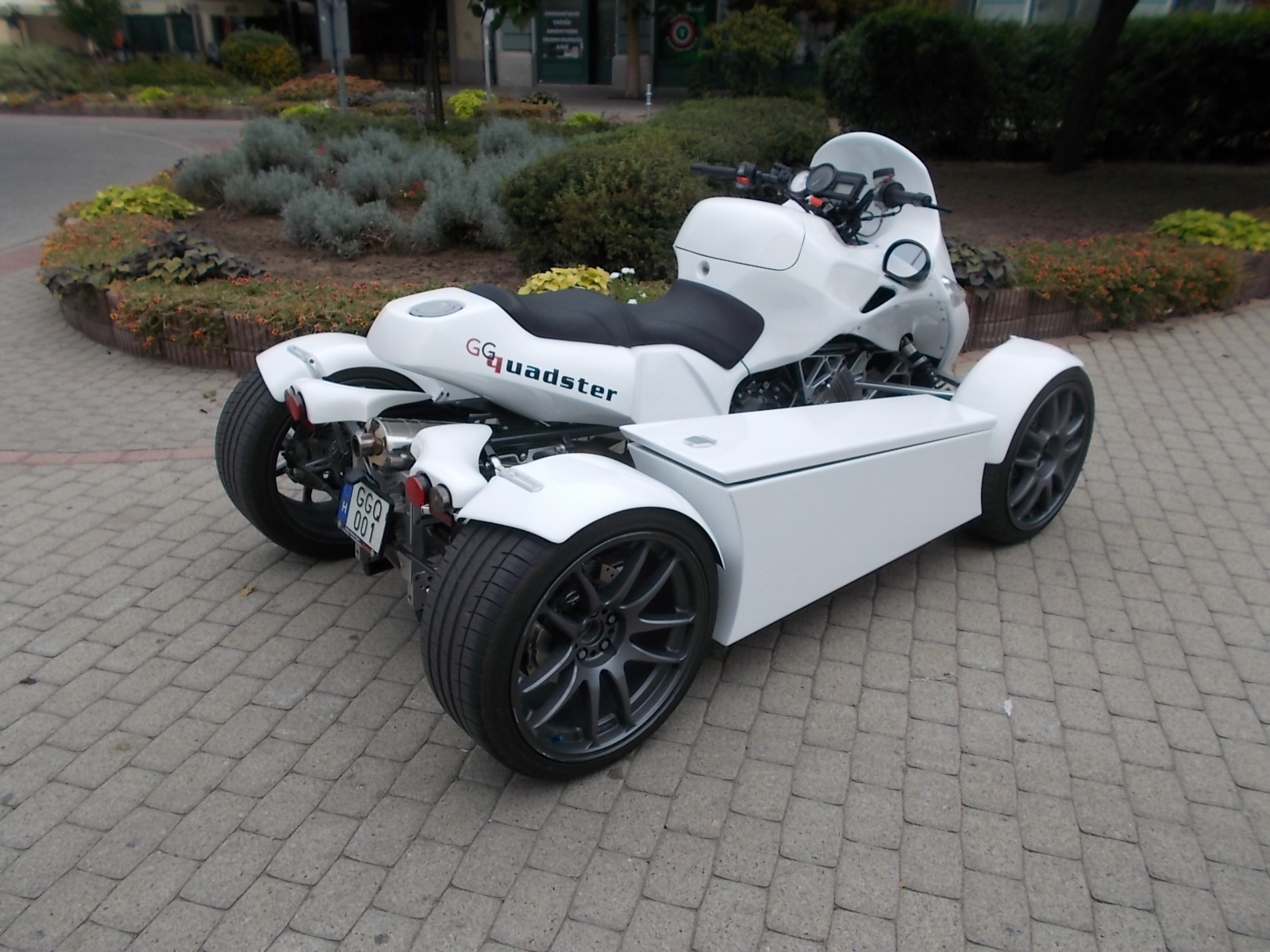

Overview
- Manufacturer: Grüter + Gut Motorradtechnik GmbH
- Production: 2008–present

Body and chassis
- Class: Quadricycle
- Related: Ludovic Lazareth Quadrazuma

Powertrain
- Engine: 1157 cc I4

Chronology
- Predecessor: GG Quad

GG Quadster is a motorized four-wheeler, or quadricycle, consisting of a BMW R1150 motorcycle with a reworked suspension and steering, and additional wheels. It has been made by Swiss manufacturer Grüter + Gut Motorradtechnik GmbH (GG) (a.k.a. Gruter und Gut) since 2008. The BMW inline-four engine produces 167 horsepower. In Germany it can be licensed as a four-wheel motor-bike, while in California it was not approved by regulators.

An earlier version was called the GG Quad. The design is similar to the Quadrazuma bike from about 2006 produced by French company Ludovic Lazareth.

== See also ==
- road vehicle
- Motorised quadricycle
