= BMW R1200RS =

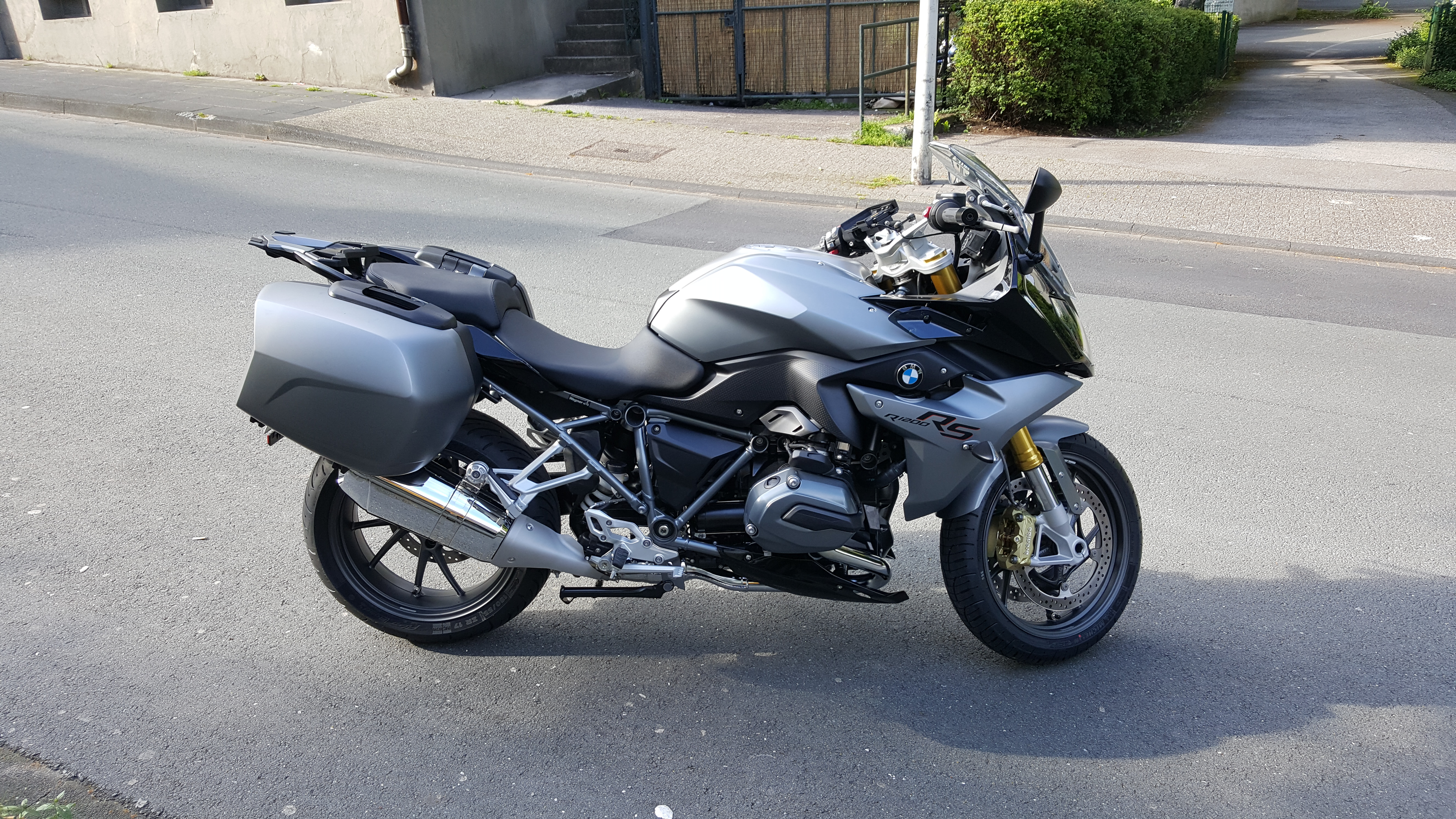
- Manufacturer: BMW
- Production: 2015-2018
- Predecessor: BMW R1200ST
- Successor: BMW R1250RS
- Engine: 1170 cc
- Power: 92 kW (123 hp) @ 7,750 rpm
- Torque: 125 N⋅m (92 lb⋅ft) @ 6,500 rpm
- Transmission: 6-speed
- Wheelbase: 1,530 mm (60.2 in)
- Seat height: 760–840 mm (29.9–33.1 in)
- Weight: 241 kg (531 lb) (wet)

The BMW R1200RS is a sport-touring motorcycle produced by BMW Motorrad. The Sports Tourer is largely based on the liquid-cooled roadster R1200R (series K53, FIN 0A04 Tool). The bike was presented in September 2014 at the Intermot. The road-oriented allrounder is equipped with a boxer engine and assembled at the BMW plant in Berlin. Production began on 9 February 2015 and was launched on 12 May 2015 at a base price of EUR 13,500. The internal factory code is K54.

For the 2019 Model Year, the R1200RS was succeeded by the R1250RS.
