= BMW R1100R =

- Manufacturer: BMW Motorrad
- Production: 1994–2003
- Assembly: Spandau, Germany
- Predecessor: R 100 R
- Successor: R 1150 R
- Class: Standard
- Engine: 1,085 cc (66.2 cu in) air/oil-cooled 4-stroke flat twin
- Bore / stroke: 99.0 mm × 70.5 mm (3.90 in × 2.78 in)
- Compression ratio: 10.3:1
- Top speed: 197 km/h (122 mph); 198 km/h (123 mph)
- Power: 57 or 59 kW (76 or 79 hp); 56.7 kW (76.1 hp) @ 6,500 rpm
- Torque: 93.4 N⋅m (68.9 lb⋅ft) @ 5,500 rpm
- Transmission: 5 speed, cardan shaft drive
- Brakes: Disk. 305 / 276 mm (12.0 / 10.9 in) front/rear, opt. ABS
- Weight: 235 kg (518 lb); 249 kg (548 lb) (wet)
- Fuel capacity: 21 L; 4.6 imp gal (5.5 US gal)
- Fuel consumption: 5.6 L/100 km (50 mpg_{‑imp}; 42 mpg_{‑US}); 34 mpg_{‑US} (6.9 L/100 km; 41 mpg_{‑imp})

The BMW R 1100 R is a standard motorcycle with a 1,085 cc (66.2 cu in) air/oil-cooled flat twin engine, made by BMW Motorrad from 1994 through to 1999. Like all of the brand's motorcycles of this period, all 53,685 units were made at BMW's Spandau, Berlin factory. The R 1100 R was succeeded by the model year 2001 R 1150 R.

The R 1100 R was reviewed favorably by Ulf Böhringer of the Süddeutsche Zeitung. Cycle World was impressed with the 1995 R 1100 R's comfort, versatility, overall quality, and successful combination of a venerable engine and frame layout with the latest technology, while noting the "fussiness" of the idiosyncratic control and accessory operations.

== Performance ==
The R 1100 R chassis and engine are identical to the BMW R1100GS, while the front brake is from the R 1100 RS. The 10.3:1 compression boxer twin was rated at 59 kW (79 hp) in the German market, or, with a restricted air filter, limited to 57 kW (76 hp) for insurance purposes. The maximum load is 215 kg (474 lb).

The bike consumes 5.6 L/100 km (50 mpg_{‑imp}; 42 mpg_{‑US}) at 120 km/h (75 mph), and has a 21 L (4.6 imp gal; 5.5 US gal) fuel capacity. Antilock brakes were an option.
