= BMW R1200ST =

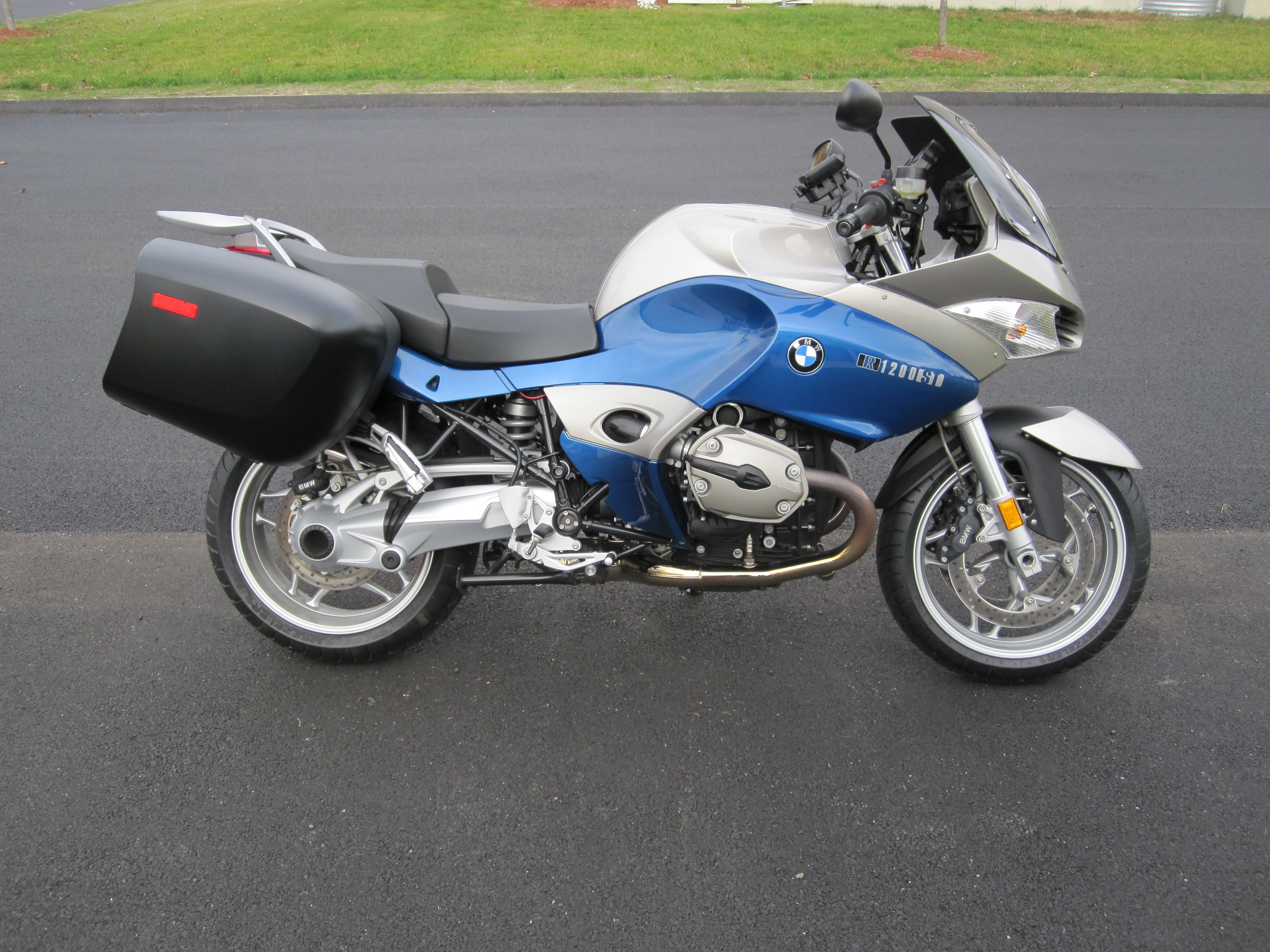
- Manufacturer: BMW Motorrad
- Production: 2005 to 2007
- Predecessor: BMW R1150RS
- Successor: BMW R1200RS
- Engine: 1,170 cc, 2-cylinder, 8-valve boxer, air/oil cooled Compression ratio: 12.0:1
- Bore / stroke: 101 mm × 73 mm (4.0 in × 2.9 in)
- Power: 109 bhp (81 kW) @ 7,500 rpm
- Torque: 115 N⋅m (85 lbf⋅ft) @ 6,000 rpm
- Transmission: 6-speed, shaft drive
- Suspension: Front: BMW Telelever; Rear: BMW Paralever
- Brakes: BMW Motorrad Integral ABS (option); Front: 4-piston EVO calipers with floating 320 mm discs Rear: 2-piston floating caliper with single 265 mm disc
- Tires: Front: 120/70ZR17 on 3.50 x 17 rim Rear: 180/55ZR17 on 5.50 x 17 rim Cast aluminium wheels
- Rake, trail: 27°, 4.4 inches (110 mm)
- Wheelbase: 1,502 mm (59.1 in)
- Dimensions: L: 2,151 mm (84.7 in); W: 870 mm (34 in); H: 1,177 mm (46.3 in)
- Weight: 205 kg (451.9 lb) (dry); 229 kg (504.9 lb) (wet)
- Fuel capacity: 21 L (4.6 imp gal; 5.5 US gal)
- Related: R1200GS; R1200RT; R1200R

The BMW R1200ST is a sport touring motorcycle, which was introduced in 2005 by BMW Motorrad to replace the R1150RS model. The R1200ST features the same 1,170 cc (71 cu in) flat-twin engine, a six-speed gearbox and shaft drive as the R1200RT.

Though similar in specification to the RT, the ST is a sport-oriented motorcycle, with clip-on style handle bars, lighter fairing, resulting in an overall lighter weight than the RT. Luggage, in the form of panniers and a top box (or case) were available options. ABS braking was also an option for this model.

The styling was controversial, especially the hexagon-shaped vertical headlight. Motor Cycle News referred to the styling as "quirky".
