= BMW R1250RS =

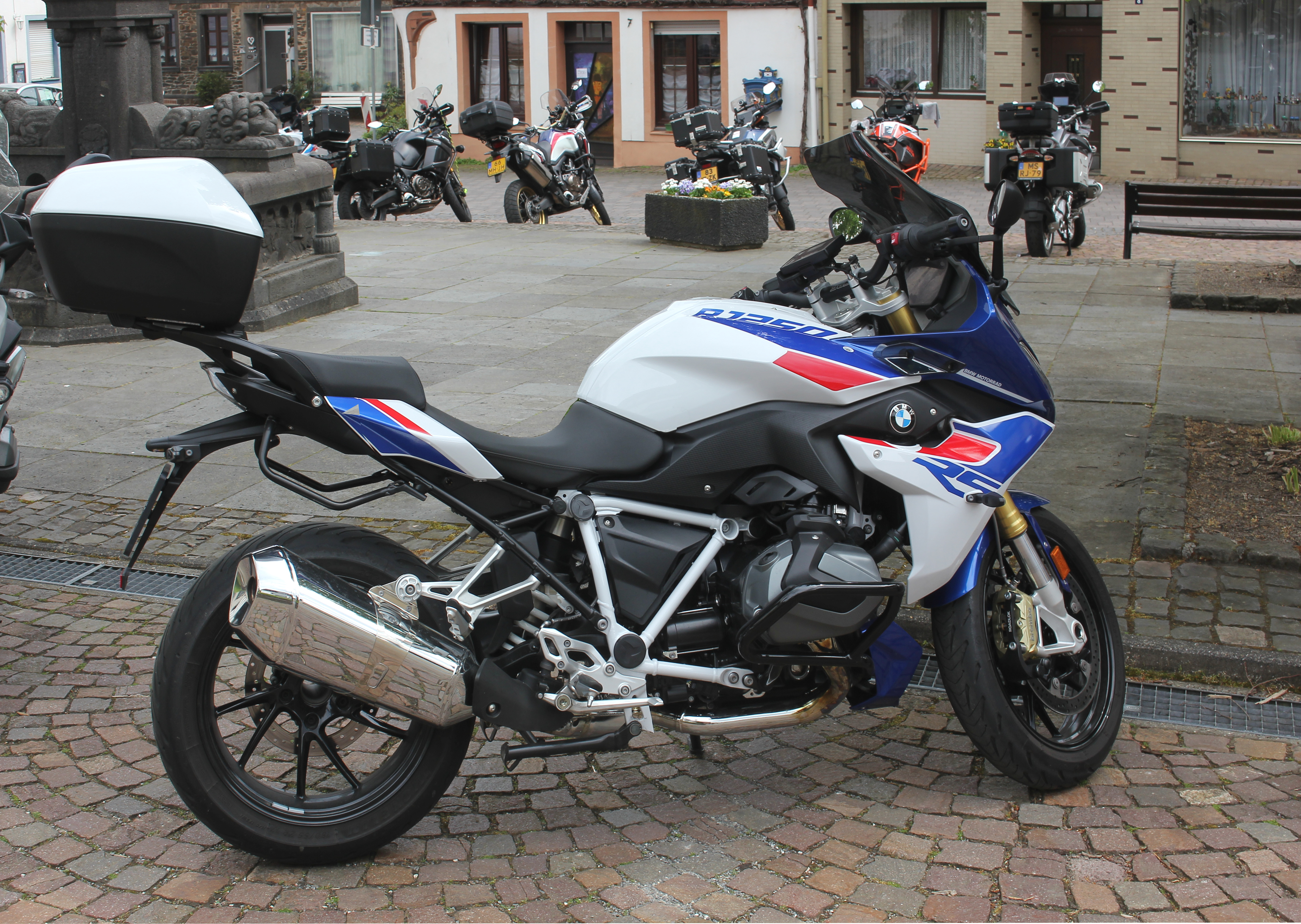
- Manufacturer: BMW
- Production: 2018–2023
- Predecessor: BMW R1200RS
- Successor: BMW R1300RS
- Engine: 1,254 cc (76.5 cu in) liquid cooled boxer twin with variable valve timing (VVT)
- Bore / stroke: 102.5 mm × 76 mm (4.04 in × 2.99 in)
- Compression ratio: 12.5:1
- Top speed: 143 mph (230 km/h)
- Power: 136 horsepower (101 kW) @ 7,750 rpm
- Torque: 105 pound force-feet (142 N⋅m) @ 6,250 rpm
- Transmission: 6-speed, shaft drive
- Suspension: Front: 45mm inverted fork Rear: BMW Paralever; Optional electronic adjustment
- Brakes: Front: Twin floating 320 mm discs, 4-piston radial calipers Rear: Single 276 mm disc, double piston floating caliper ABS
- Tires: Front: 120/70 R 17 Rear: 180/55 R 17 (LC) Spoked or alloy, tubeless wheels
- Wheelbase: 1,530 mm (60 in)
- Dimensions: L: 2,207 mm (86.9 in); W: 925 mm (36.4 in); H: 1,255 mm (49.4 in)
- Seat height: 820 mm (32 in)
- Weight: 243 kg (536 lb) (wet)
- Fuel capacity: 18 L (4.0 imp gal; 4.8 US gal)
- Related: BMW R1250RT, BMW R1250R, BMW R1250GS

The BMW R1250RS is a sport touring motorcycle (Reise Sport) produced by BMW Motorrad. It was unveiled at EICMA in November 2018. Like the other versions of the R-series, which include the R1250RT, R1250R (Roadster) and R1250GS, the motorcycle model is powered by a boxer engine.

== Specifications ==
=== Powertrain ===
The air- and water-cooled two-cylinder engine produces a nominal output of 136 horsepower (101 kW) at 7,750 rpm and a maximum torque of 143 newton-metres (105 lbf⋅ft) at 6,250 rpm from a displacement of 1254 cm^{3}. It has a sliding camshaft (shiftcam) that adjusts the timing for the lower, middle and upper speed ranges and changes the intake valve lift. Depending on the position, a partial load or full load cam acts on the valves. A regulated three-way catalytic converter treats the exhaust gas. The engine meets the Euro 5 emissions standard. There is also engine drag torque control (MSR). Consumption in the WMTC cycle is given as 4.75 L/100 km (CO_{2} emissions are 110 g/km). The magazine Motorrad und Reisen reports from around 3.9 to around 5.3 L/100 km.

=== Design ===
The frame consists of a main frame and a rear frame bolted to it, with the engine also serving as a load-bearing element. The R1250RS has an upside-down telescopic fork at the front and a cast aluminum single-sided swingarm at the rear. The chassis is complemented by traction control (Dynamic Traction Control, DTC) and Pro driving modes with driving mode preselection. On request, a semi-active chassis with automatic level control to adapt to the load condition is available.

The R1250RS is equipped with two LED headlights and a 6.5-inch TFT display. The eCall emergency call is available upon request, as are add-on parts milled from solid aluminum. The 6-speed transmission can be equipped with shift support, also known as quickshifter or blipper. The machine has an 18-liter tank (including 4 liter reserve).
