= HICOM Handalan Truck =

Hicom Handalan
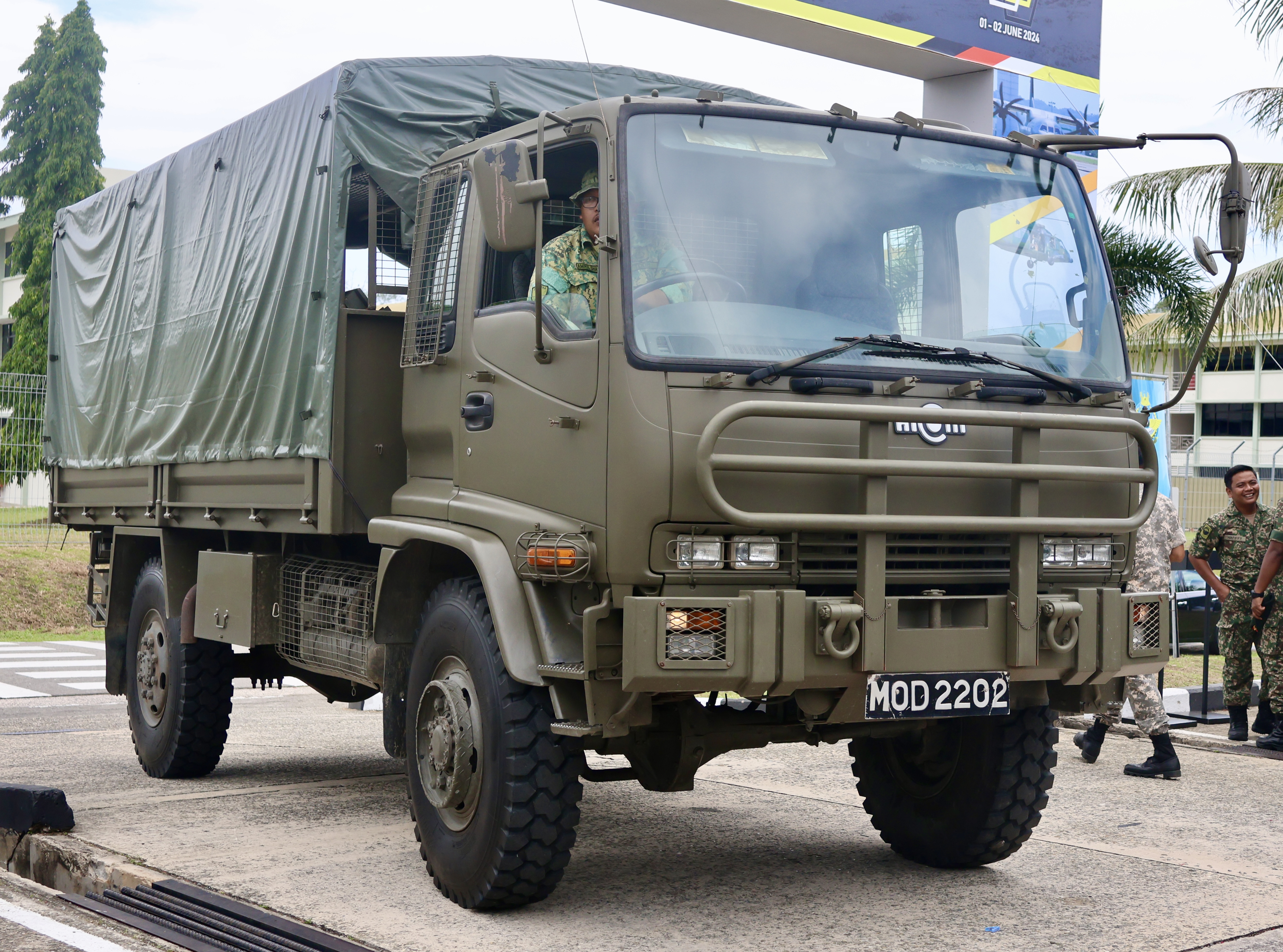
- Handalan of the Royal Brunei Land Force

Overview
- Manufacturer: DRB-HICOM Defence Technologies (DefTech)
- Production: 1996–present

Body and chassis
- Class: Medium duty truck
- Body style: 2-door standard cab

Powertrain
- Engine: Isuzu 6HE1
- Transmission: 5-speed manual; 4-speed automatic

Dimensions
- Length: 6.94 m
- Width: 2.4 m
- Height: 3.23 m
- Curb weight: 5.8 t

The HICOM Handalan (also known as DefTech Handalan) is a Malaysian truck developed by DRB-HICOM subsidiary, DRB-HICOM Defence Technologies (DefTech) in collaboration with Isuzu in 1996. It based on Isuzu FSS 32G where at the first phase of development DRB-HICOM gained a license to locally assembled Isuzu FSS 32G in Malaysia to replace the 3-ton truck already used by Malaysian Armed Forces.

== History ==
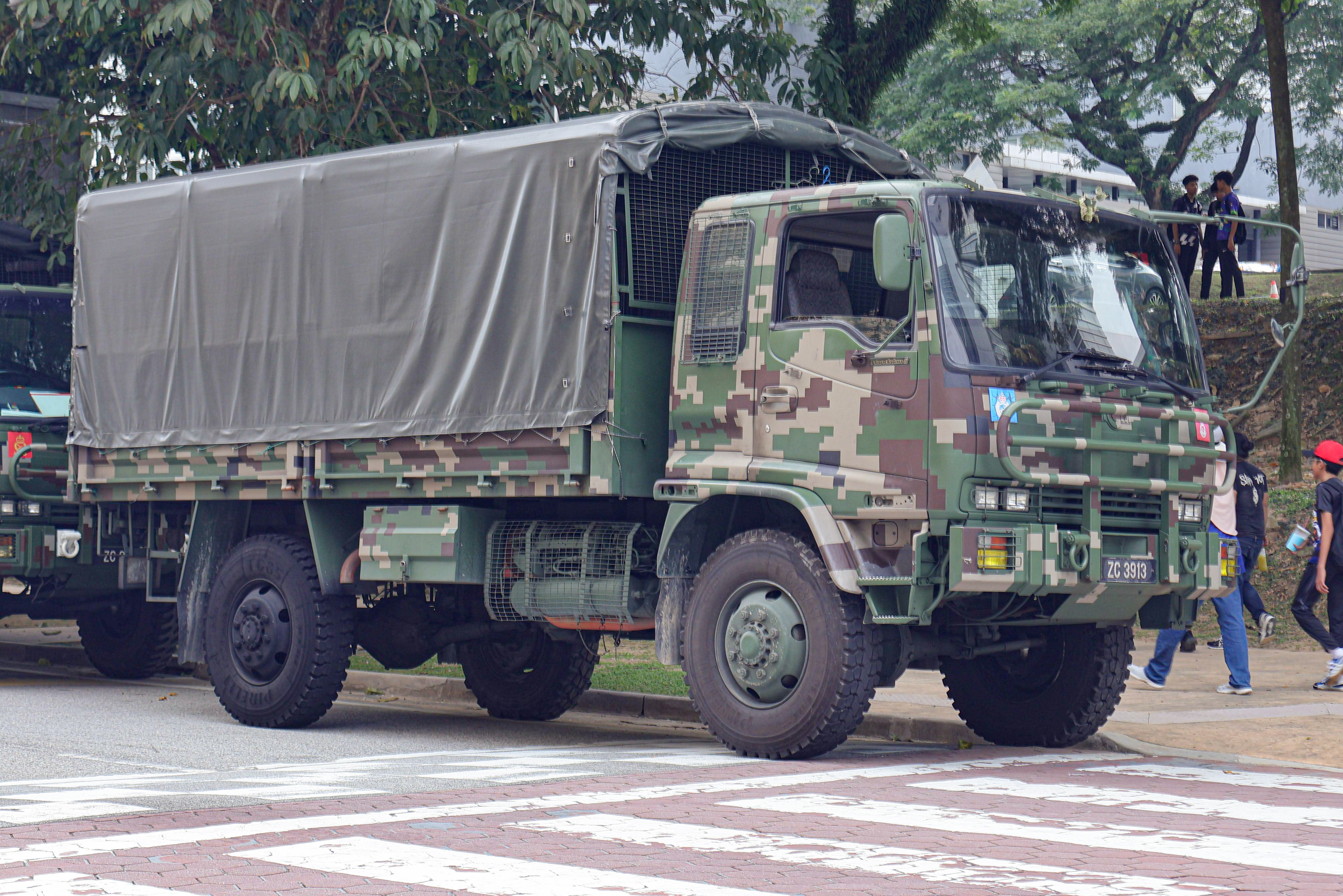
Handalan of the Malaysian Army during 2024 Malaysia Independence Day

The development of the Handalan continued when DRB-HICOM able to improved the truck performance and replaced some of the Japanese-made components with locally made components thus easier for the user for the maintenance.

Handalan trucks are developed in several versions namely Handalan I, Handalan II and Handalan III where each version received its owned upgrade and improvement based on latest needs.

== Variants ==
=== Handalan I ===
First variant of the truck. Powered by Isuzu 6HE1 diesel engine with 180 hp with 5-speed manual transmission and configured for a 4x4. Then production stopped in 2003 and was replaced by the new Handalan II.

=== Handalan II ===
Updated model with more powerful engine that generates 195 hp. The manual transmission also replaced with 4-speed automatic gearbox. Handalan II can carry up to 4,800 kg on the road and 3,000 over rough terrain. The other improvement of the Handalan II includes Allison 2500 SP fully automatic transmission and optional equipment offered including automatic chassis grease system, vehicle monitoring system and heavy duty type winch system (5,400 kg).

=== Handalan III ===
A third generation of Handalan truck revealed in 2012. The truck uses Tata diesel engines that generate more powerful 230 hp.

== Operators ==
=== Military operators ===
- Australia :
  - Royal Australian Air Force - 6 uses in RMAF Butterworth.
- Brunei :
  - Royal Brunei Land Forces - 115 in service.
- Malaysia :
  - Malaysian Army - 2,674 in service.
  - Royal Malaysian Navy
  - Royal Malaysian Air Force
  - Johor Military Forces
- Timor-Leste :
  - Timor-Leste Defence Force - 9 in service.

=== Civil operators ===
- Malaysia
  - Royal Malaysia Police
  - Fire and Rescue Department of Malaysia
  - Malaysia Civil Defence Force

=== Future operators ===
- Lebanon :
  - Lebanese Armed Forces - At least 10+ trucks will be hand over to Lebanese Armed Forces from UN Malaysian Battalion (MALBATT) peacekeeping forces.
