= BMW R1150R =

BMW R 1150 R
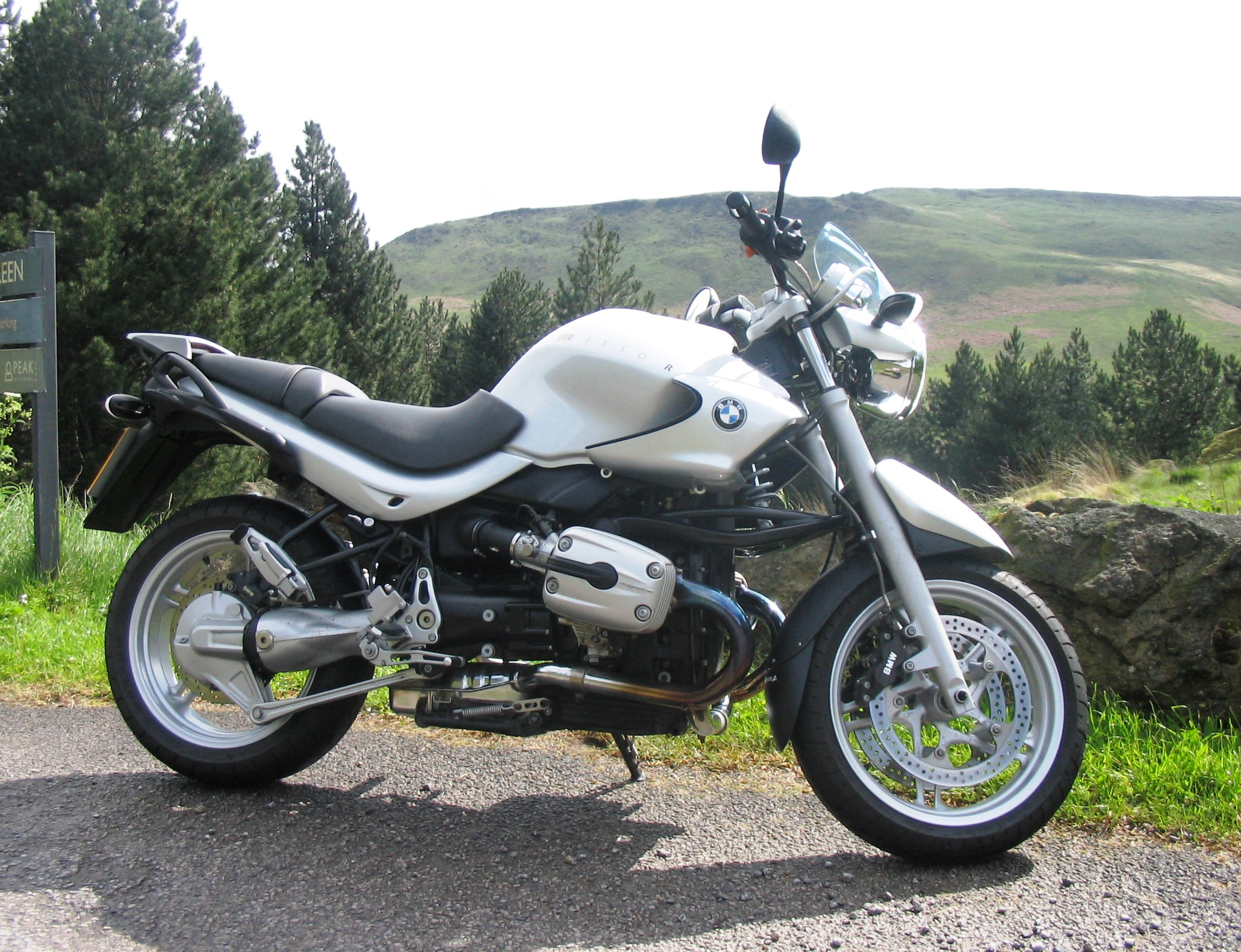
- Manufacturer: BMW Motorrad
- Production: 2001–2005
- Predecessor: R 1100 R
- Successor: R 1200 R
- Class: Standard
- Engine: 1,130 cc (69 cu in), flat twin, 4-valve per cylinder, air/oil cooled
- Transmission: 6-speed, shaft drive
- Suspension: Front: BMW Telelever; Rear: BMW Paralever
- Brakes: front twin 305mm (320mm '00+) disc 12 inch (12.6") float, 4 piston caliper
- Tires: front 120 70-ZR 17, rear 170 60-ZR 17
- Wheelbase: 1,487 mm (58.5 in)
- Dimensions: L: 2,170 mm (85 in); W: 920 mm (36 in); H: 1,165 mm (45.9 in)
- Fuel capacity: 21 L (4.6 imp gal; 5.5 US gal)

The BMW R1150R is a standard (or roadster) motorcycle made by BMW Motorrad. It was in production from 2001 through 2005, the successor to the R 1100 R that had been discontinued in 1999. The R 1150 R was marketed as a road going motorcycle suited for general commuting as well as sports touring, with 85 bhp. In 2006 it was succeeded by the R 1200 R.

Compared to the related R 1150 RT touring motorcycle, the R 1150 RS sport-touring bike, and the R 1150 GS dual-sport (or adventure) bike, the R or 'roadster' version was the non-specialist, aimed at the 'all-rounder' niche, emphasizing balanced traits, and versatility. It had a Telelever front suspension, and a Paralever rear. Anti-lock brakes were an option.
