= BMW R1250GS =

- Manufacturer: BMW
- Production: 2019–2023
- Predecessor: BMW R1200GS
- Successor: BMW R1300GS
- Class: Adventure touring
- Engine: 1,254 cc (76.5 cu in) liquid cooled boxer twin with variable valve timing (VVT)
- Bore / stroke: 102.5 mm × 76 mm (4.04 in × 2.99 in)
- Compression ratio: 12.5:1
- Top speed: 130.8 mph (210.5 km/h)
- Power: 134 hp (100 kW) @ 7,750 rpm
- Torque: 105.5 lb⋅ft (143.0 N⋅m) @ 6,250 rpm
- Transmission: 6-speed, shaft drive
- Suspension: Front: BMW Telelever; Rear: BMW Paralever; Optional electronic adjustment
- Brakes: Front: Twin floating 305 mm discs, 4-piston radial calipers; Rear: Single 276 mm disc, double piston floating caliper ABS
- Tires: Front: 120/70 R 19; Rear: 170/60 R 17 (LC)Spoked or alloy, tubeless wheels
- Wheelbase: 1,500 mm (59 in); 1,520 mm (60 in)
- Dimensions: L: 2,207 mm (86.9 in); 2,270 mm (89 in) (Adv); W: 895 mm (35.2 in); 980 mm (39 in) (Adv); H: 1,450 mm (57 in)
- Seat height: 850–870 mm (33–34 in)
- Weight: 249 kg (549 lb); 268 kg (591 lb) (Adv) (wet)
- Fuel capacity: 20 L (4.4 imp gal; 5.3 US gal)
- Related: BMW R1250RT, BMW R1250R, BMW R1250RS

The BMW R1250GS is a motorcycle manufactured in Berlin, Germany by BMW Motorrad, part of the BMW group. It is one of the BMW GS family of dual sport motorcycles. It has a 1,254 cc (76.5 cu in), two-cylinder boxer engine with four valves per cylinder and variable valve timing (VVT).

== History ==
In September 2018, Kevin Cameron wrote that a "shift cam" VVT system was destined for a 2019 model year R1250GS, and other media reported the technology was to be adopted on all the R series boxer motors. In September 2018, BMW confirmed the 2019 R1250GS and sibling R1250RT would have VVT.

== Chassis ==
Wet weight is up from the predecessor to 249 kg (549 lb).

== Engine ==
The engine displaces 1,254 cc (76.5 cu in) with 102.5 mm (4.04 inches) mm bore × 76 mm (3.0 inches) stroke. The intake camshafts have two cam lobes per valve that can be switched within one cam revolution between partial-throttle and open-throttle cam profiles. Power and torque claimed by BMW are higher than the predecessor model at 134 hp (100 kW) at 7,750 rpm and 105.5 lb⋅ft (143.0 N⋅m) at 6,250 rpm, with 4% better fuel economy.
