= BMW R1200R =

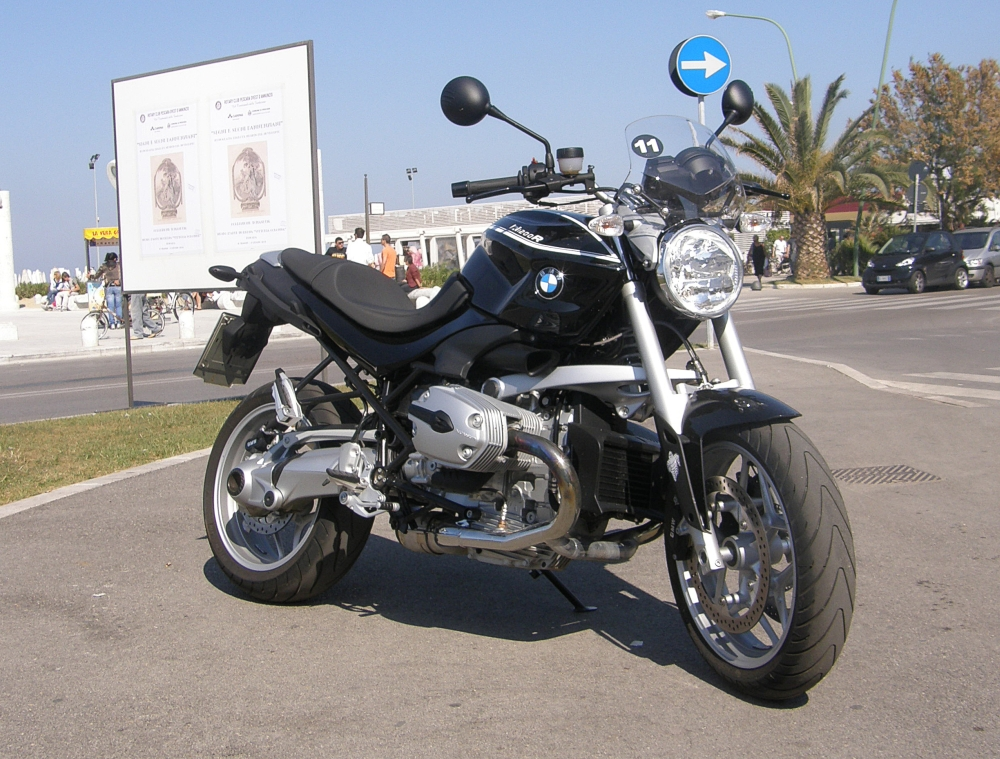
- Manufacturer: BMW Motorrad
- Production: 2006–2018
- Predecessor: R1150R
- Successor: R1250R
- Class: Standard
- Engine: 1,170 cc (71 cu in), 2-cylinder, 8-valve boxer, air/oil cooled (2015-2018)Air/liquid-cooled 4-stroke flat twin engine, four valves per cylinder, double overhead camshaft
- Bore / stroke: 101 mm × 73 mm (4.0 in × 2.9 in)
- Power: 2006–2014: 2015–2018: 93 kW (125 hp) @ 7,750 rpm
- Torque: 2006–2014: 2015–2018: 125 N⋅m (92 lb⋅ft) @ 6,500 rpm
- Transmission: 6-speed, shaft drive
- Suspension: 2006–2014: Front: BMW Telelever; Rear: BMW Paralever; 2015–2018: Front: 45 mm inverted cartridge fork; Rear: single-sided swing arm with BMW EVO Paralever
- Brakes: BMW Motorrad Integral ABS (part-integral); Front: 4-piston EVO calipers with floating 320 mm discs; Rear: 2-piston floating caliper with single 265 mm disc
- Tires: Front: 120/70ZR17 on 3.50×17 cast aluminum wheel; Rear: 180/55ZR17 on 5.50×17 cast aluminum wheel
- Rake, trail: 27.1°, 110 mm (4.3 in)
- Wheelbase: 1,495 mm (58.9 in)
- Dimensions: L: 2,145 mm (84.4 in); W: 872 mm (34.3 in); H: 1,285 mm (50.6 in)
- Fuel capacity: 18 L (4.0 imp gal; 4.8 US gal)
- Related: R1200RT, R1200GS, R1200ST

The BMW R1200R (series K27) is a standard motorcycle introduced in 2006 by BMW Motorrad. It replaces the R1150R, compared with which it has a 55 lb (25 kg) weight saving and 28% increase in power. The air/oil-cooled flat-twin (boxer) engine produces 80 kW (109 hp) and features dual overhead camshafts. The model uses BMW's signature Telelever front suspension and Paralever rear suspension system.

Optional equipment included Anti-lock Braking System (ABS), heated grips, on-board computer, and Electronic Suspension Adjustment (ESA). For the 2007 model year, BMW added a new dual spark version of the engine to meet Euro 3 emission standards. In 2011, the R1200R received updates including a revised engine with double overhead camshafts and optional Automatic Stability Control (ASC).

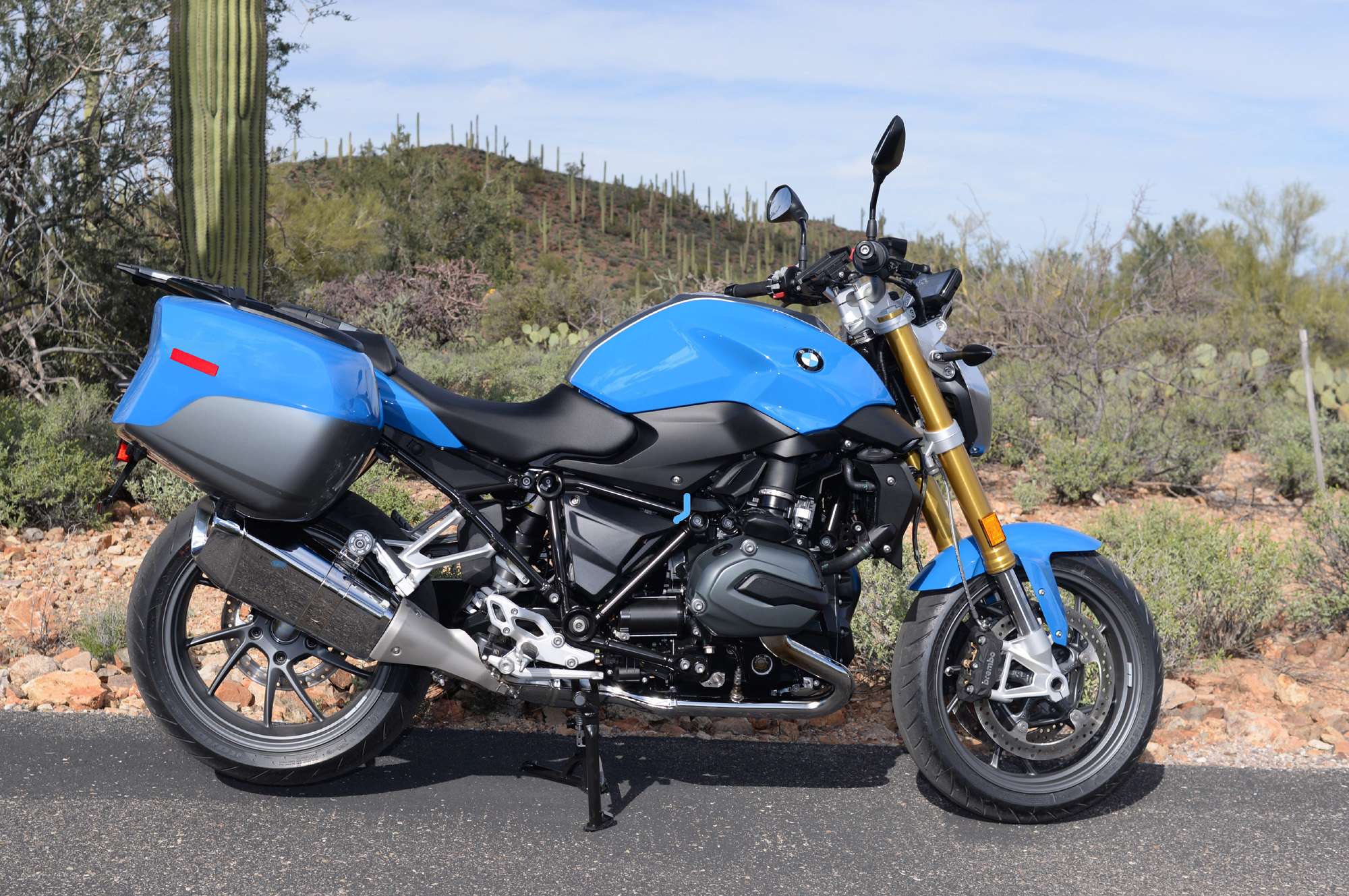
2015 BMW R1200R

For model year 2015, a completely new R1200R (series K53) with the same 125 hp (93 kW) liquid/air-cooled engine as the 2014/2015 R1200RT, but weighing 100 pounds less, was introduced. It featured a new frame design and major changes included the switch from Telelever to upside-down telescopic forks and the addition of optional electronic suspension adjustment (Dynamic ESA).

For the 2019 Model Year, the R1200R was succeeded by the R1250R with an increased engine displacement of 1254cc. The R1250R features a newer ShiftCam dual cam profile engine producing more power (100 kW/136 hp) and comes equipped with a TFT display.
