= BMW R90S =

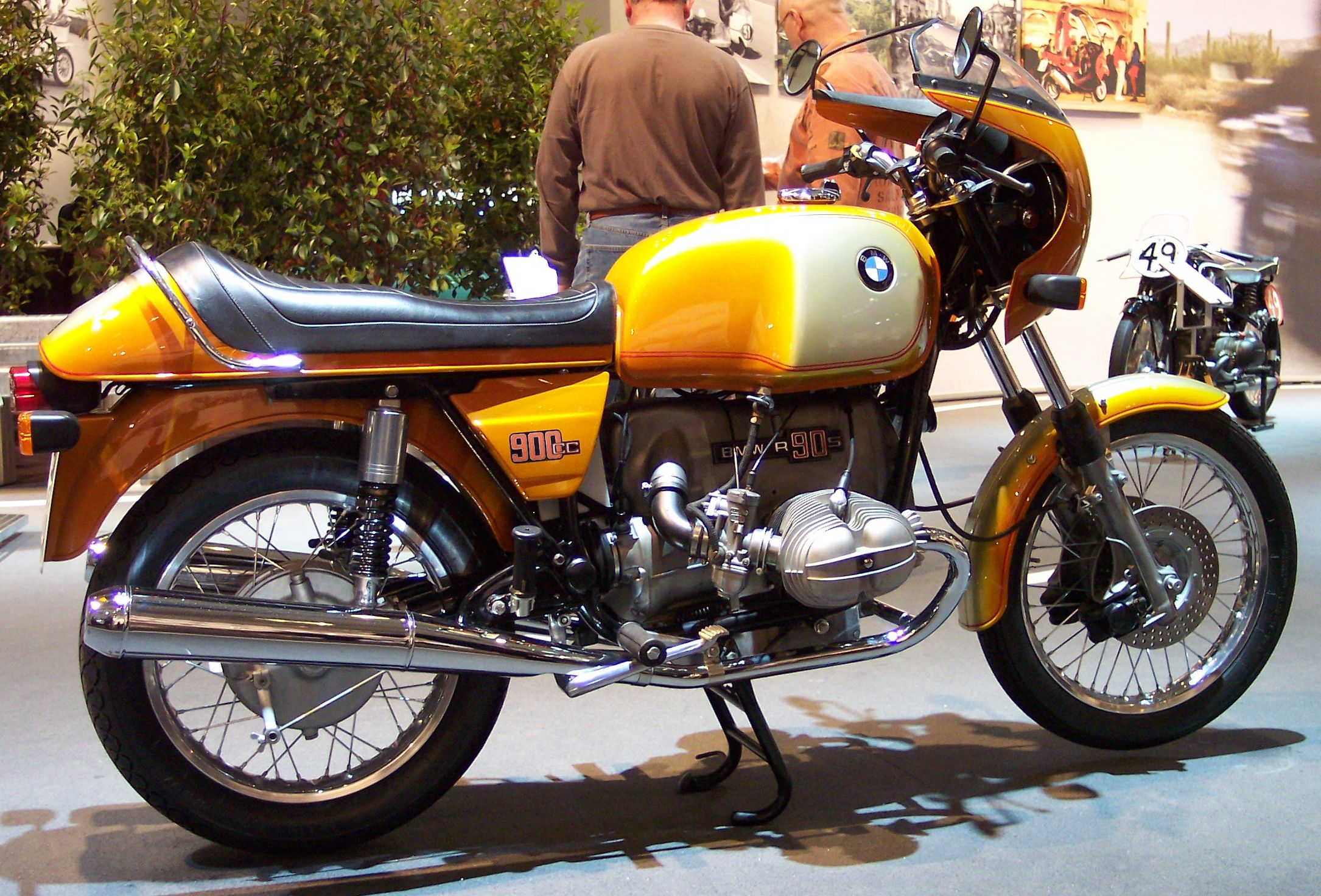
- Manufacturer: BMW Motorrad
- Production: 1973–1976
- Class: sport motorcycle
- Engine: 898 cc Four-stroke, two-cylinder, horizontally opposed "Boxer", air-cooled
- Bore / stroke: 90 mm × 70.6 mm (3.54 in × 2.78 in)
- Top speed: 124 mph (200 km/h)
- Power: 67 hp (50 kW)
- Torque: 76 N⋅m (56 lbf⋅ft)
- Transmission: 5-speed, shaft drive
- Brakes: Front: dual 260 mm discs Rear: 200 mm drum
- Tires: Front: 19 in (480 mm) Rear: 18 in (460 mm)
- Wheelbase: 1,465 mm (57.7 in)
- Dimensions: L: 2,180 mm (86 in); W: 740 mm (29 in); H: 1,210 mm (48 in)
- Seat height: 820 mm (32 in)
- Weight: 215 kg (474 lb) (wet)
- Fuel capacity: 24 L (5.3 imp gal; 6.3 US gal)
- Related: R90/6

The BMW R90S is a 900cc sport motorcycle produced by BMW from 1973 to 1976. BMW commissioned designer Hans Muth to oversee the R90S, which became the flagship of the boxer engined "/6" range. Sporting distinctive two-tone paintwork, a bikini fairing and a new tail, the R90S was intended to shrug off the enduring image of BMW bikes as staid and utilitarian.

The 67 bhp (50 kW) R90S had a top speed of 124 mph (200 km/h), it ran the quarter mile in around 13.5 seconds and it accelerated from 0 to 62 mph (0–100 km/h) in 4.8 seconds. Maximum torque was delivered at 5,500 rpm and the engine redlined at 7,200 rpm.

== Technical overview ==
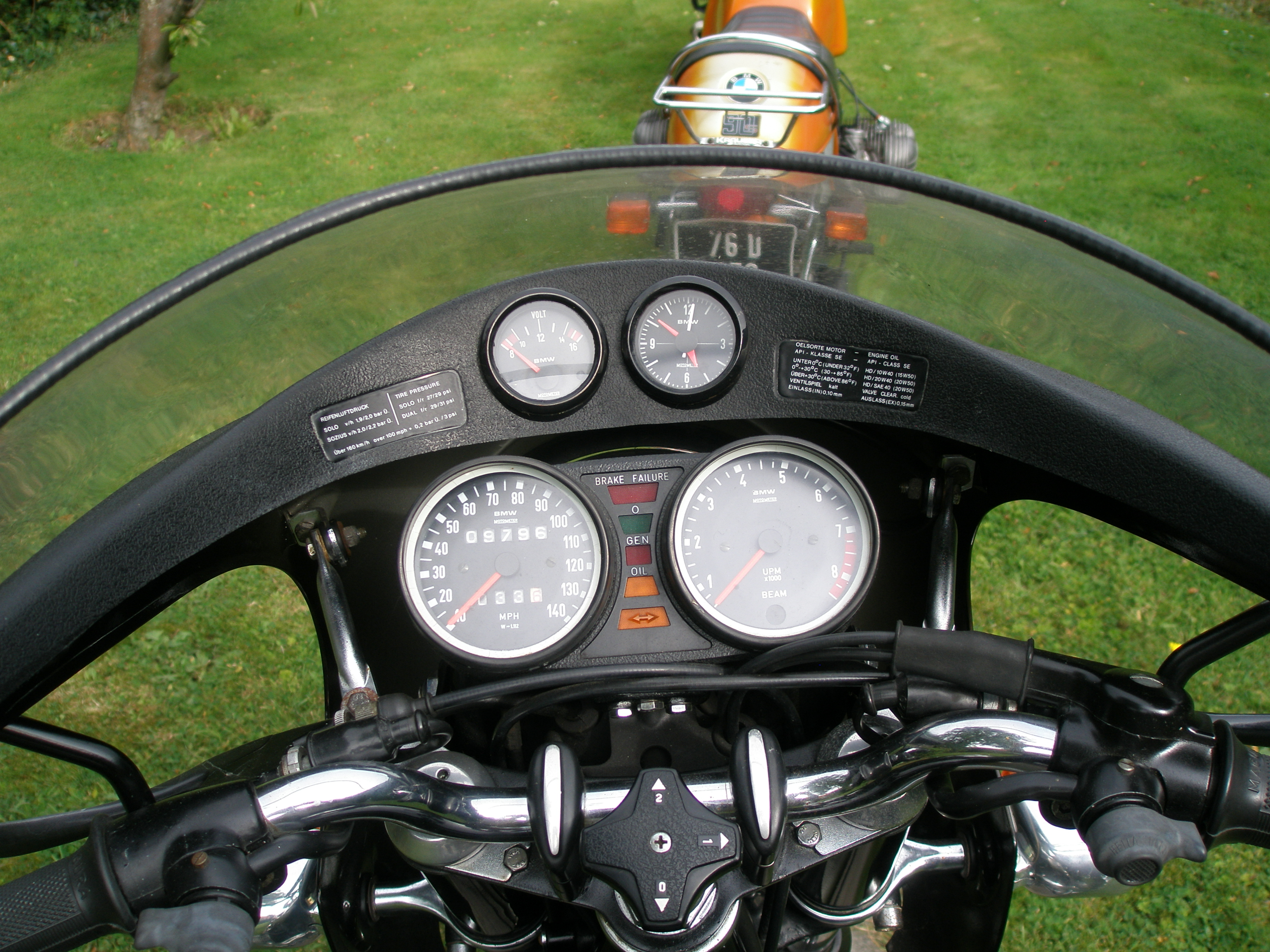
BMW R90S cockpit

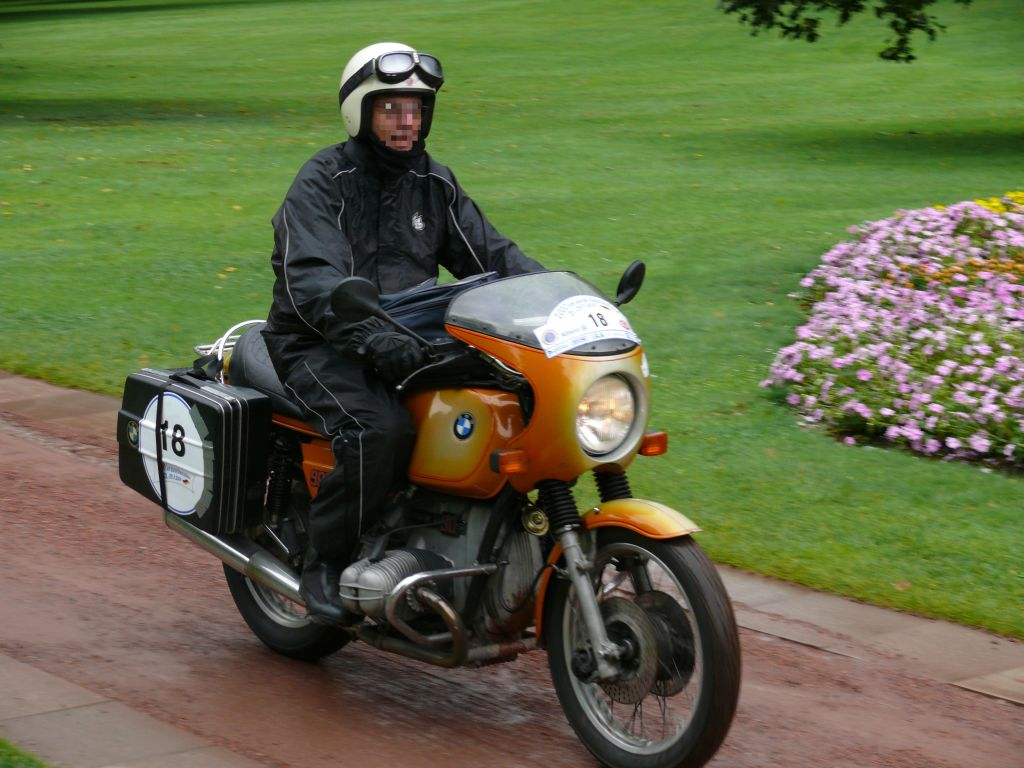
BMW R90S fitted with panniers

The R90S' type 247 "airhead" engine was a pushrod OHV, two valve per cylinder, air-cooled flat-twin "boxer" unit. The engine was based closely on the R75/5, sharing the same stroke, but with a larger bore, to give a capacity of 898cc. The R90S weighed 215 kg (474 lb) and has a five-speed gearbox with a shaft final drive. The first R90S models had a two-tone paintwork scheme of "Smoke Black/Silver" with adhesive gold pinstripes. Feedback from unimpressed customers prompted BMW to return to hand painted pinstripes. Later R90S models were available also in two-tone "Daytona Orange" with red pinstriping. The R90S had a redesigned seat, with a small "ducktail" fairing which (in addition to an underseat tool tray) provided a small storage space for lightweight items such as waterproofs. Standard equipment included a full toolkit, a hand pump, a first-aid kit and even a small hand towel with an embroidered BMW logo.

The R90S had a small bikini fairing which housed two analogue instruments: a clock and a voltmeter. Its 238 watt alternator was later upgraded to 250 watt. An adjustable hydraulic steering damper was manually adjusted via a knob on the steering head. Suspension was by long-travel telescopic forks and twin rear shocks whose rear dampers were adjustable for preload (the only suspension adjustment available). Whereas other BMW boxers had Bing slide constant velocity carburetor, the R90S was fitted with accelerator pump Dell'Orto carburetors. The R90S engine had a 9.5:1 compression ratio, while the less sporty R90/6 had a ratio of 9:1.

The alloy wheels were spoked and wore tubed tyres. The front brake had twin 230 mm disks and ATE callipers; the rear brake was a 200 mm SLS drum. The R90S and the other BMW "/6" series front brakes had an unusual system whereby a master cylinder on the top frame tube was activated by a cable from the front brake lever. This arrangement was supposed to protect the master cylinder in the event of a crash; but later "/7" machines adopted a conventional handlebar-mounted Brembo master cylinder.

There were three series of the R90S:

- model year 1974: September 1973 to August 1974 (6,058 units)
- model year 1975: June 1974 to September 1975 (6,413 units) - A strengthened crankshaft has a new main bearing to prevent flex.
- model year 1976: August 1975 to June 1976 (4,984 units) - Engine casings are improved in anticipation of the forthcoming R100S.

Other differences distinguish the three series: After the first series, brake discs were drilled. The first series kept the "/5" series kick start lever. The later 17mm diameter front axle was stronger than the first series 14mm axle. The original R90S had "/5" switchgear, but this was changed in 1975 to a new non-standard design that proved unpopular. The engine crankcase breather was a phenolic disc-&-spring item which made a 'popping' sound as the breather operated. The modified "/7" breather was a reed valve design, which could be retro-fitted to "/6" models to replace their noisy breathers.

== Production numbers ==
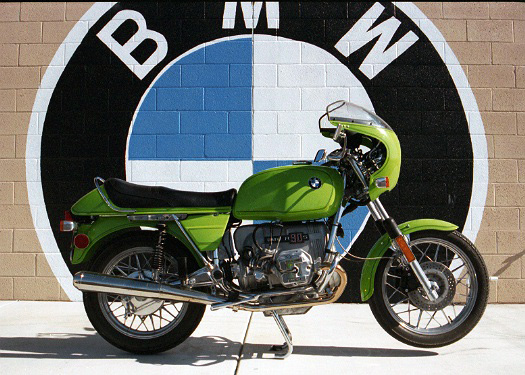
A small number of R90S motorcycles, as this one, were fitted with Krauser 4-valve heads, providing increased power

From 1973 to 1976, 17,455 R90S models were sold. The R90S was succeeded in 1977 by the R100S, which retained the bikini fairing with altered paintwork, and whose engine capacity was increased to 1,000 cc. The R100S reverted to using 40 mm Bing CV carbs. The BMW flagship mantle passed to the R100RS, which now sported a full fairing.

Other factory variants included the R100CS of 1983–1984. The R90S always had "/5" type "round" valve covers, but the R100CS had black-painted "squared" valve covers. The other bikes in the BMW "/6" range were the new R90/6, the R75/6, and the R60/6. The 500cc R50/5 was discontinued and no "R50/6" version was produced.

== Legacy ==
A later example of the R259 oilhead BMW, the R850/1100R, sported a similar two-tone smoke grey paint scheme in homage to the original BMW 'superbike' color scheme.

At the 1974 Isle of Man TT, Hans-Otto Butenuth and Helmut Dähne unexpectedly placed their R90S motorcycles in second and third places in the 1000cc Production Class TT behind Mick Grant riding the motorcycle nicknamed Slippery Sam. At the 1976 Isle of Man TT, Butenuth and Dahne teamed up to win the 1000cc class of the 10-lap, 373.7mile, Production TT race and finished fifth overall. Their victory marked the first solo TT race win for BMW since Georg Meier won the Senior TT at the 1939 Isle of Man TT.

Two R90S bikes placed first and second at the very first AMA Superbike race at Daytona International Speedway in 1976. On the first place bike was Steve McLaughlin and on the second was Reg Pridmore. The first place bike is now in the BMW Mobil Tradition Collection. Pridmore rode an R90S to win the 1976 AMA Superbike Championship.
