= BMW /6 motorcycles =

German boxer twin motorcycle (1974–1976)

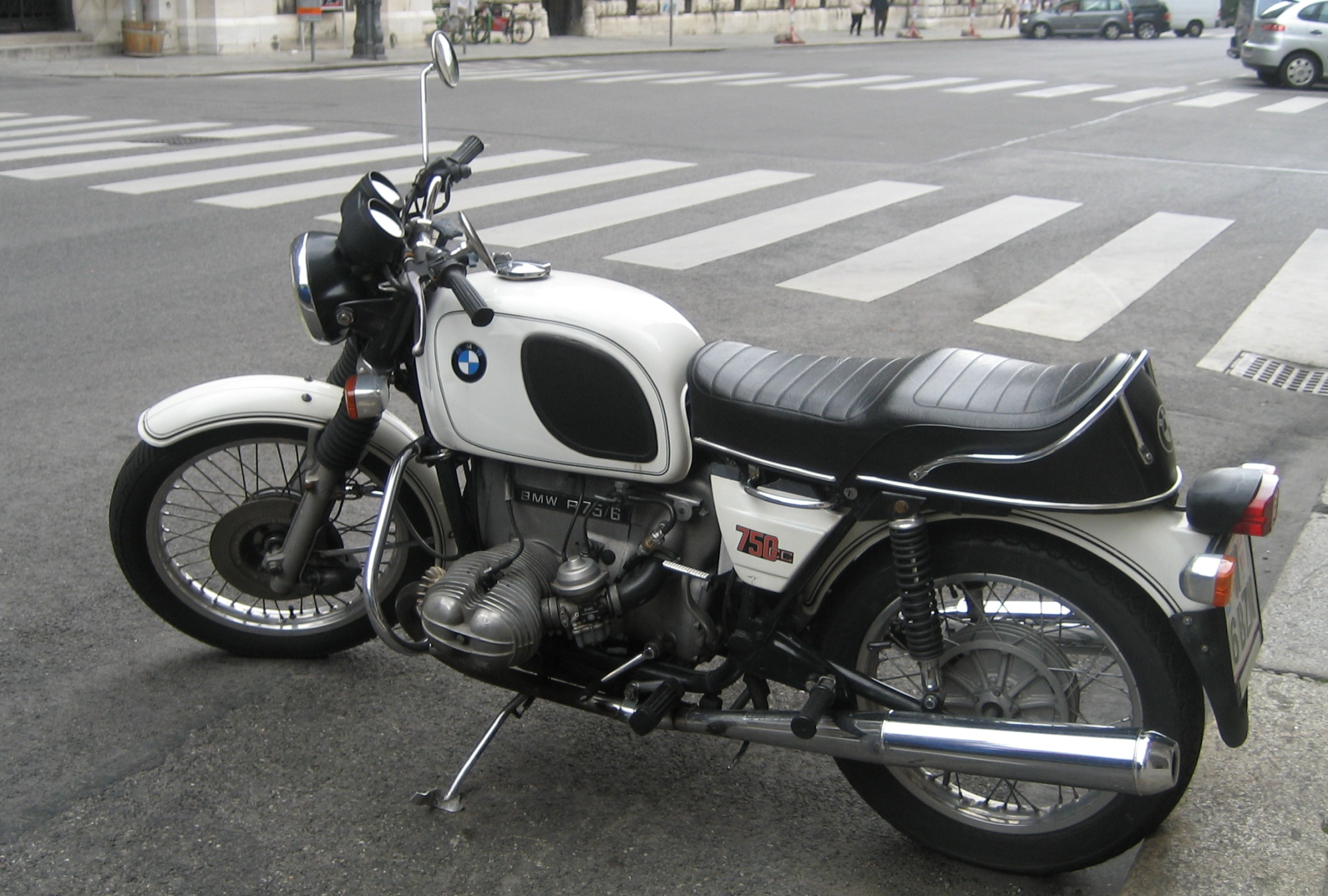
R75

The BMW R60/6, R75/6, R90/6 and the sport model BMW R90S form a range of boxer twin motorcycles that were manufactured in Berlin, Germany, by BMW from 1974 to 1976. The "slash six" models departed from the earlier "slash five" slightly. First, the smallest displacement changed from 500cc to 600cc. A sport model was offered, as were disc brakes (front only) for the first time. Additionally, the tank design was changed to remove the chrome trim panels (rubber knee pads were added instead), and the gauge pod was moved from the headlight housing to its own assembly over the housing.

== Technical data ==
Like the preceding /5 bikes, the /6 models are air-cooled, four-stroke, opposed-twin (boxer) engines with hemispherical combustion chambers. The engine is built around a one-piece tunnel crank-case. The camshaft is driven by a duplex chain and is located below the crankshaft. Valves are actuated by the camshaft through hardened followers, push rods, and rocker arms. The same base 247 engine was used for these motorcycles.

Final drive is by shaft, running from the transmission by universal joint to an oil bath within the right rear swing arm and connecting to a bevel gear and ring gear on the other end. Like the /5 models, the /6 models are equipped with telescopic front forks, 12-volt alternator and electrics, and standard tachometer and turn signals.

	R 60/6	R 75/6	R 90/6	R90S
Bore	73.5 mm (2.89 in)	82 mm (3.2 in)	90 mm (3.5 in)	
Stroke	70.6 mm (2.78 in)			
Displacement	599 cc (36.6 cu in)	749 cc (45.7 cu in)	898 cc (54.8 cu in)	
Power	40 hp (30 kW) @ 6,400 rpm	50 hp (37 kW) @ 6,200 rpm	60 hp (45 kW) @ 6,500 rpm	67 hp (50 kW) @ 7,000 rpm
Torque	36 ft⋅lbf (49 N⋅m) @ 5,000 rpm	44 ft⋅lbf (60 N⋅m) @ 5,000 rpm	53 ft⋅lbf (72 N⋅m) @ 5,500 rpm	56 ft⋅lbf (76 N⋅m) @ 5,500 rpm
Top speed	103 mph (166 km/h)	110 mph (180 km/h)	116 mph (187 km/h)	124 mph (200 km/h)
Curb weight	462 lb (210 kg)			474 lb (215 kg)
Gross vehicle weight rating	876 lb (397 kg)			
Alternator	Bosch 12 V • 280 Watts			
Spark plugs	Bosch W230 T30 / Champion N7Y		Bosch W200 T30	
Fuel tank	4.8 US gal (18 L; 4.0 imp gal) or 5.8 US gal (22 L; 4.8 imp gal)			6.34 US gal (24.0 L; 5.28 imp gal)
Tires	3.25x19 front • 4.00x18 rear			
Rims	1.85x19 front • 2.15x18 rear			
