= R65 =

R65 may refer to:

- R65 (New York City Subway car)
- R65 (South Africa), a road
- BMW R65, a motorcycle
- HMS St. James (R65), a destroyer of the Royal Navy
- R65: Harmful: may cause lung damage if swallowed, a risk phrase
