= Indian 841 =

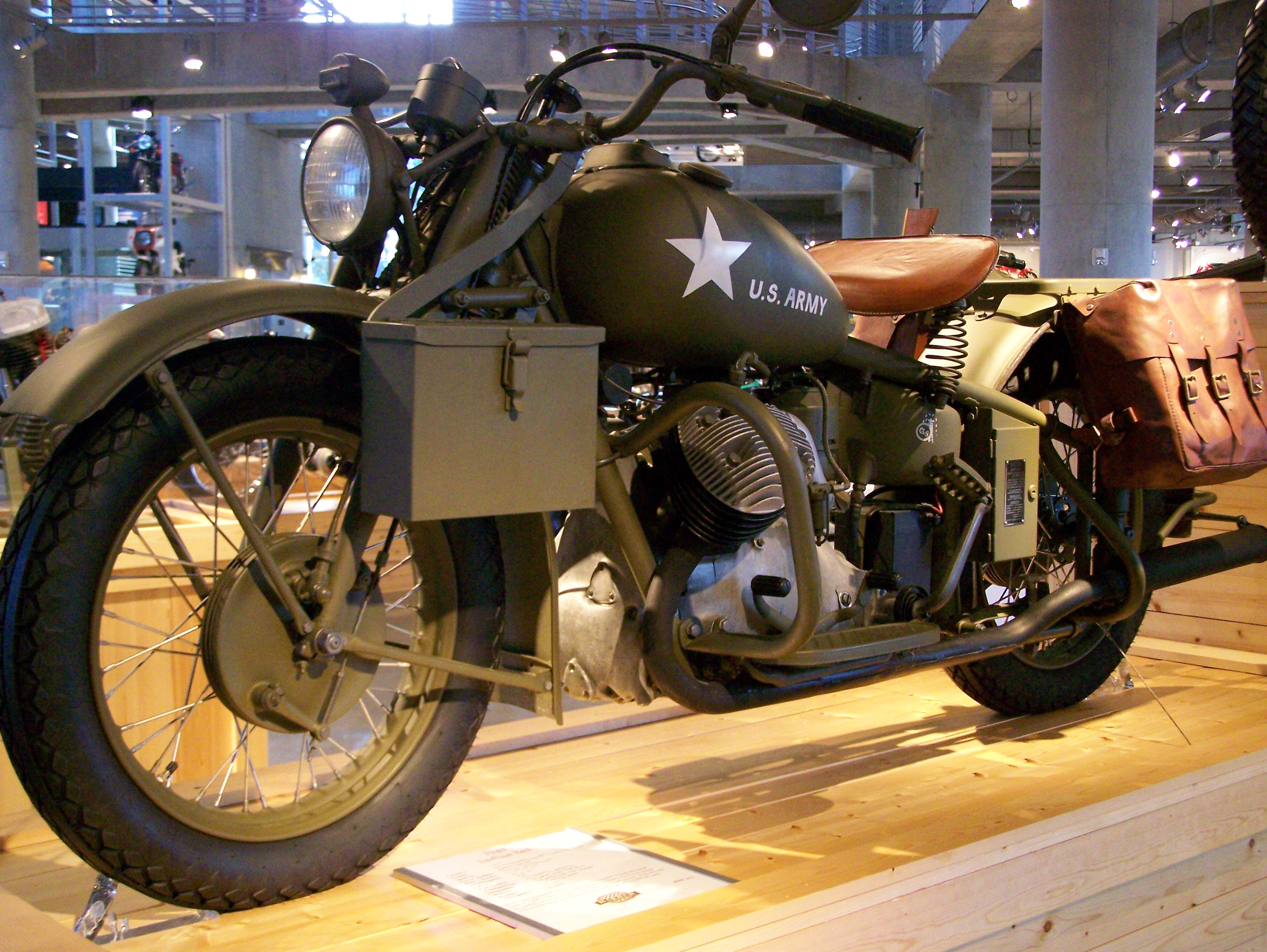
- Indian 841 at Barber Vintage Motorsports Museum, Battleground, Birmingham, AL USA
- Manufacturer: Indian Motocycle Manufacturing Co.
- Production: 1941–1943; 1 056 produced
- Class: military
- Engine: 45 cu. in. (737 cc) 90° air-cooled side-valve V-twin
- Bore / stroke: 2.87 in × 3.50 in (73 mm × 89 mm)
- Top speed: 70 mph (113 km/h)
- Power: 25 bhp
- Transmission: Four speed, foot shift; shaft drive
- Suspension: Front: Girder fork with coil springs and shock absorber Rear: Plunger-type with coil springs
- Brakes: Front and rear: Drum
- Weight: 528 lbs. (240 kg) (wet)
- Fuel capacity: 5 gal.
- Related: Indian Sport Scout (engine internals)

The Indian 841 was a motorcycle designed by the Indian Motocycle Manufacturing Co. for desert warfare. It pioneered the drivetrain configuration later popularized by Moto Guzzi, having a longitudinally mounted air-cooled 90-degree V-twin with shaft drive to the rear wheel.

== History ==
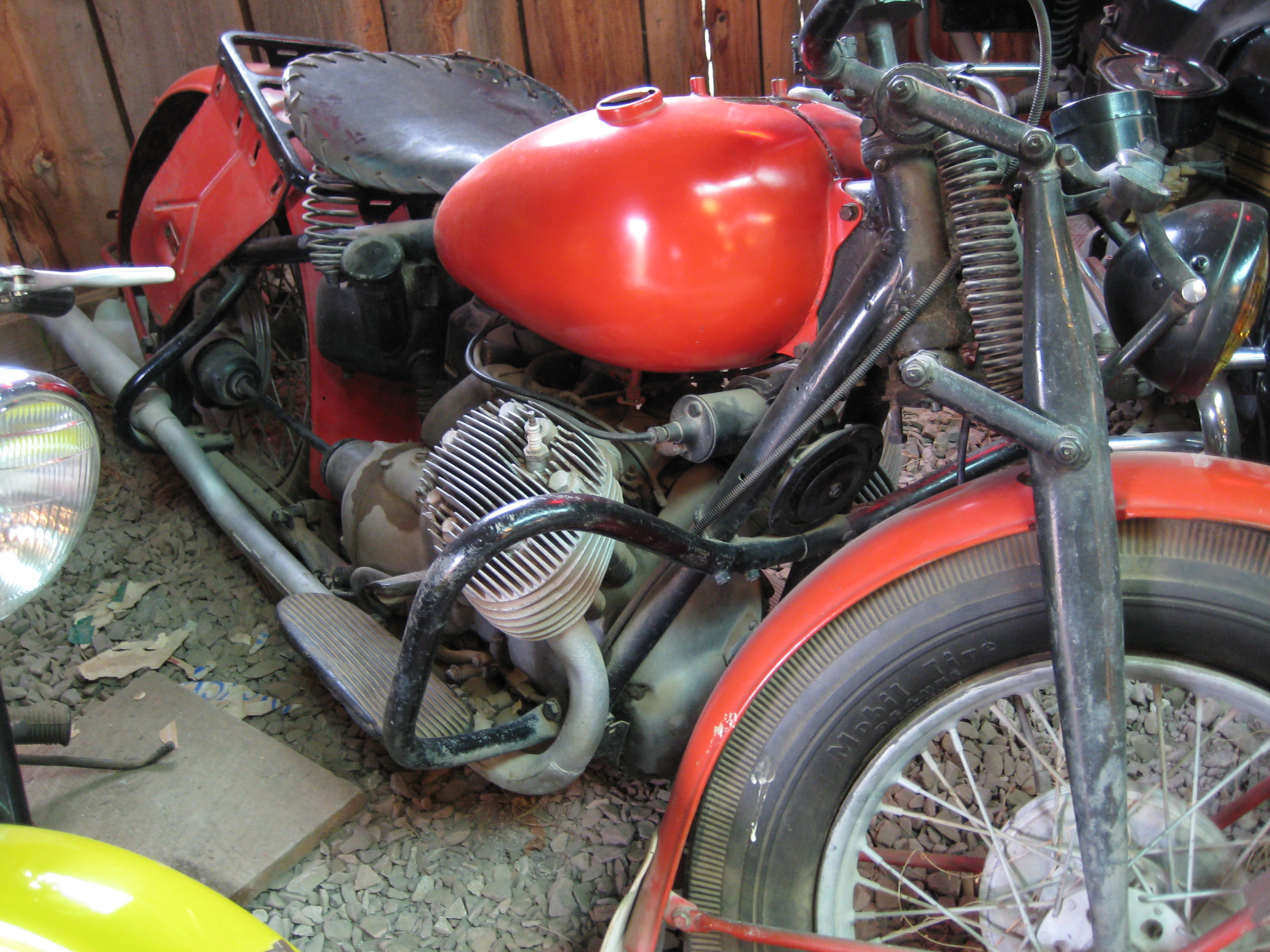
Close-up of Indian 841, showing girder forks and cylinder layout

During World War II, the US Army requested experimental motorcycle designs suitable for desert fighting and offered Indian $350,000 in exchange for 1,000 shaft-drive, side-valve, twin-cylinder test motorcycles. In response to this request, Indian designed and built the 841 (8 for the new engine design and 41 for the year).

The Indian 841 was heavily inspired by the BMW R71 motorcycle, as was its competitor, the Harley-Davidson XA. However, unlike the XA, the 841 was not a copy of the R71. Although its tubular frame, plunger rear suspension, four-speed transmission, foot-operated shifter, hand-operated clutch and shaft drive were similar to the BMW's, the 841 was different from the BMW in several aspects, most noticeably so with its 90-degree longitudinal-crankshaft V-twin engine and girder fork. Also unlike the R71 and the XA, the 841 used a heel-and-toe shift pedal with heel-operated upshifts and toe-operated downshifts. The bike also had a low compression ratio of 5.1:1, meaning that it could be run on low-octane fuel, crash bars to protect the cylinders, 18-inch wheels, two separate gas tanks for a total of 5 gallons of available fuel and newly designed girder forks for better shock absorption. In order to reduce costs, the new V-twin shared several internal components with the existing Indian Sport Scout, resulting in the same bore and stroke of 2.87 in × 3.50 in (73 mm × 89 mm).

The Indian 841 and the Harley-Davidson XA were both tested by the Army, but neither motorcycle was adopted for wider military use. It was determined that the Jeep was more suitable for the roles and missions for which these motorcycles had been intended. The 841 had also been found to have gearbox problems. Surplus 841s were eventually sold from the corporate warehouse in Springfield.

Indian enthusiast Sammy Pierce used the tank and frame of his 841 along with the case and cylinders of an Indian Chief to make his P-61 American Rocket, featured on the cover of the May 1952 issue of Cycle magazine.

== Drivetrain configuration ==
Similar drivetrain configurations, using wide-angle longitudinally mounted V-twins with shaft drive, were later used on the 1953–1956 Victoria Bergmeister motorcycle, the Honda CX series, and, most notably, on medium- and large-sized Moto Guzzi motorcycles.

== See also ==
- BMW R75
- G-numbers (SNL G631)
- List of motorcycles of the 1940s
- List of motorcycles of the 1950s
