= BMW R80G/S =

German motorcycle

BMW R 80 G/S
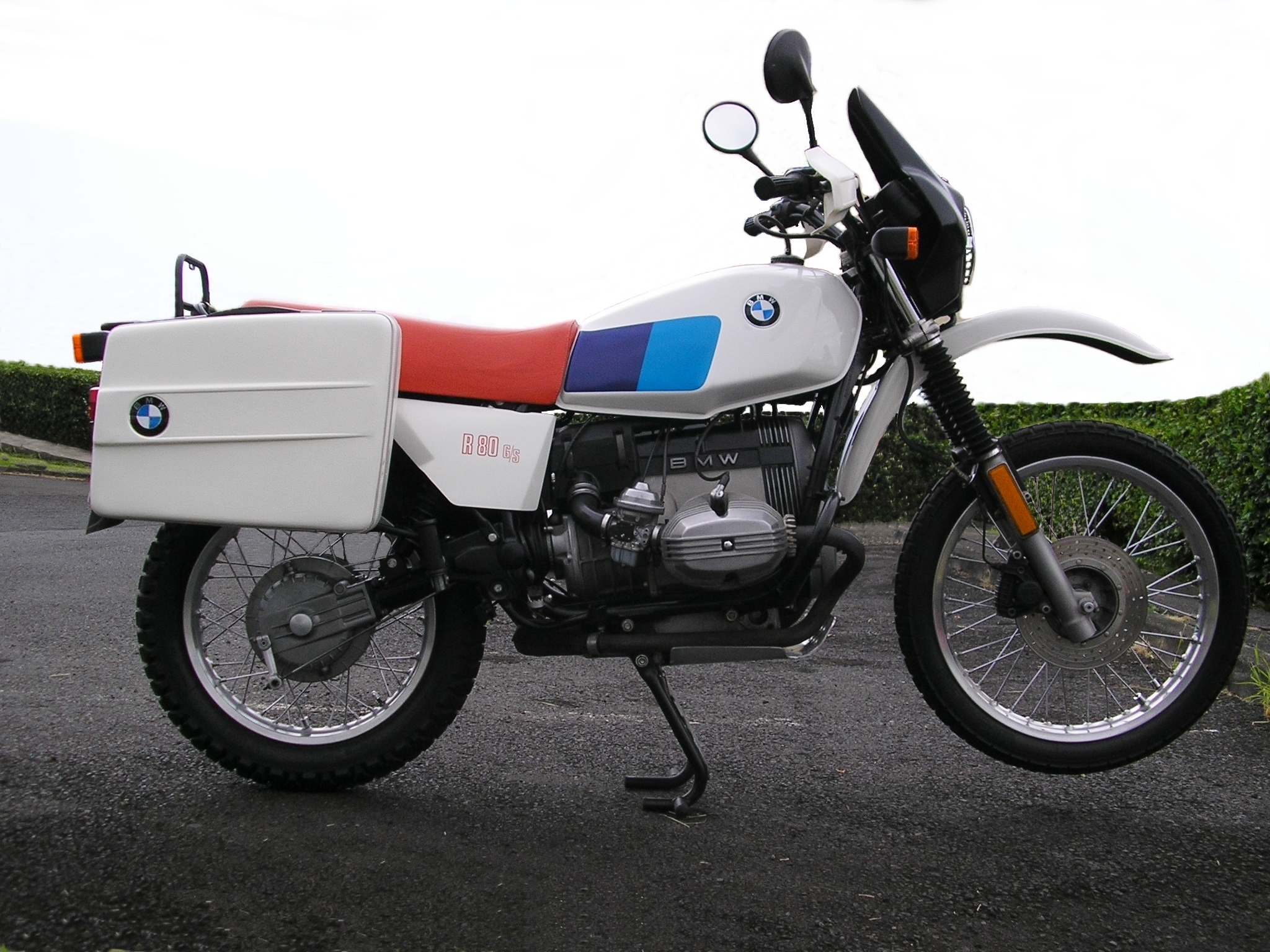
- Manufacturer: BMW Motorrad
- Production: 1980–1987
- Successor: R 100 GS
- Class: Dual-sport
- Engine: 797.5 cc (48.67 cu in) flat-twin boxer
- Bore / stroke: 84.8 mm × 70.6 mm (3.34 in × 2.78 in)
- Top speed: 104 mph (167 km/h)
- Power: 50 hp (37 kW)
- Torque: 41 lb⋅ft (56 N⋅m)
- Transmission: 5-speed shaft drive
- Suspension: Front: Telescopic forks Rear: Single spring / shock absorber
- Brakes: Front: Single 260 mm disc Rear: 200 mm drum
- Wheelbase: 1,465 mm (57.7 in)
- Dimensions: L: 2,230 mm (88 in); W: 820 mm (32 in); H: 1,150 mm (45 in)
- Seat height: 860 mm (34 in)
- Weight: 186 kg (410 lb) (wet)
- Fuel capacity: 19.5 litres (4.3 imperial gallons)
- Related: R 65 GS, R 80 ST

The BMW R 80 G/S is a motorcycle that was manufactured in Berlin, Germany, by BMW Motorrad from 1980 to 1987. Production totalled 21,864 bikes. It was the first in the BMW GS family of specialised dual-sport bikes, of which over 500,000 have been produced, and is often considered the world's first "Adventure Bike" able to be equally capable on and off-road. The designation G/S stands for the German words Gelände/Straße, which mean offroad/road – highlighting the bike's dual sport design.

== Specification ==
The R 80 G/S (G for Gelände "offroad" in German S for Straße "street") was the first large displacement multisport bike on the market. The G/S was fitted with a 797.5 cc (48.67 cu in) BMW type 247 engine, which is a flat-twin (boxer) sometimes known as an airhead. The engine, which was fitted into an R65 frame, was a modified version of that fitted to the R 80/7, featuring Nikasil cylinders, electronic ignition and a lighter flywheel. At the rear the bike had the new "monolever," a combined single-sided swingarm and drive shaft, with the rear damping provided by a single shock absorber. The monolever was stiffer and lighter than the design fitted to previous models, and was subsequently fitted to other BMW motorcycles. It was a sealed suspension lever with the driveline inside the lever filled with oil to lubricate the shaft and parts. The single sided swing arm enabled the rear wheel to be removed easily with the bike on the center stand. It differs from other BMW road bikes of the same era due to its lighter weight, longer suspension travel, and large 21 inch front wheel. The bike gained popularity with adventure-seeking travellers after having won the Paris–Dakar Rally several times. BMW offered numerous optional parts including a 32-litre (7.0 imp gal; 8.5 US gal) fuel tank with Gaston Rahier's signature, a solo seat, stainless exhaust and a larger battery meaning that for the first time a true adventure travel motorcycle could be purchased directly from a manufacturer. The market it created spawned many aftermarket motorcycle accessories, such as larger fuel tanks and panniers.

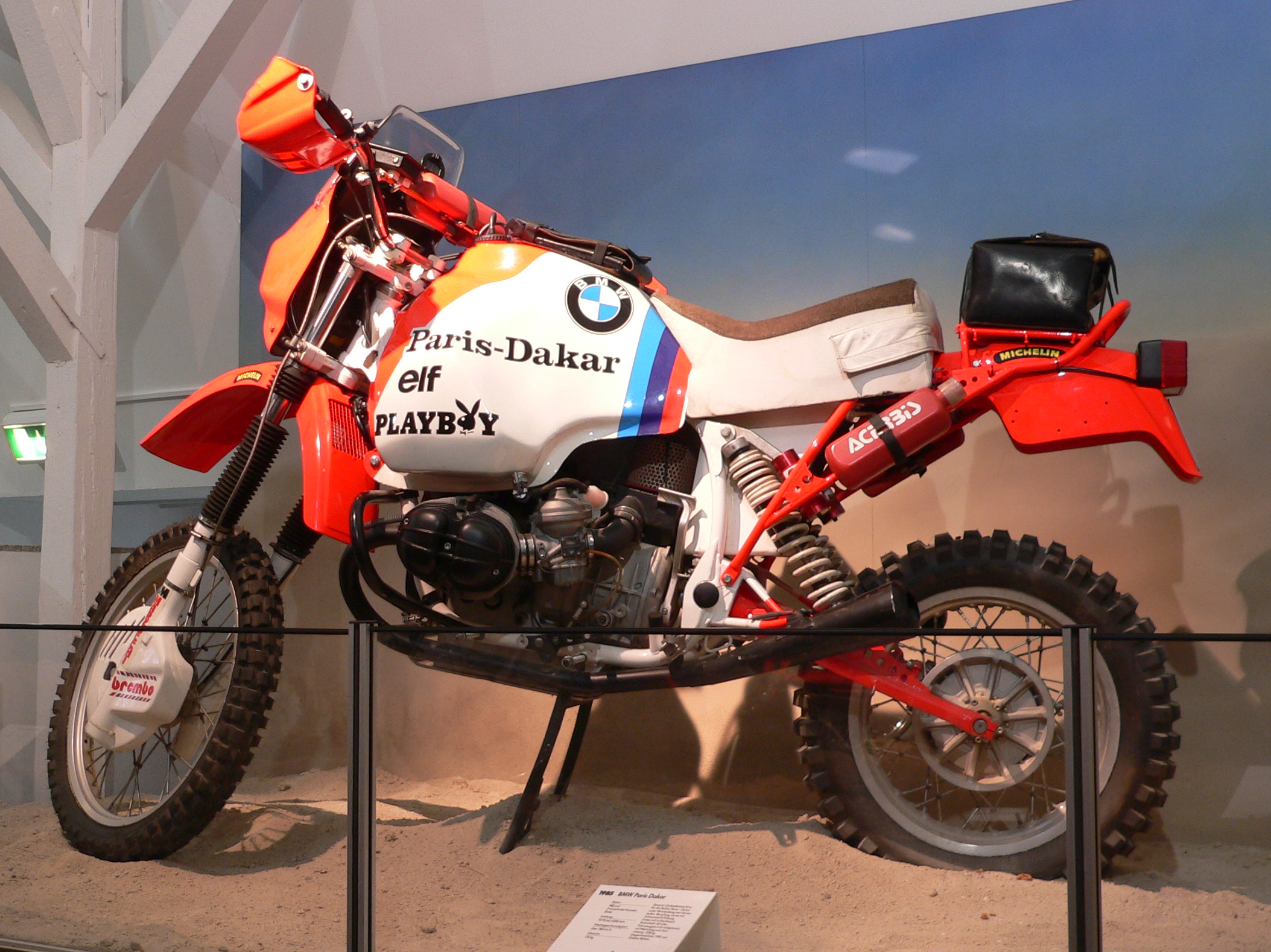
Gaston Rahier's 1985 Paris-Dakar winning R 80 G/S

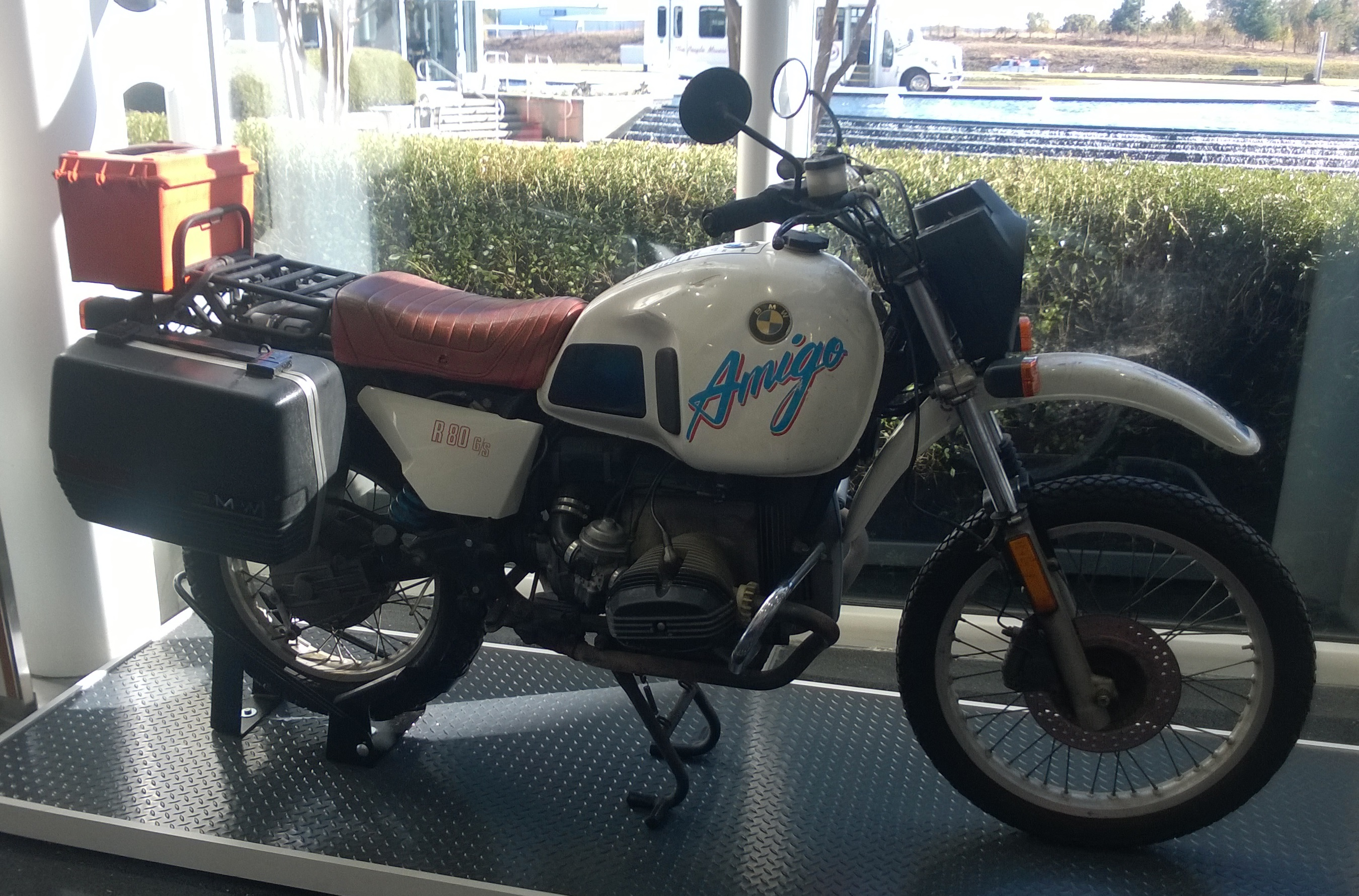
Ed Culberson's "Amigo", the first vehicle to cross the Pan-American Highway completely by land.

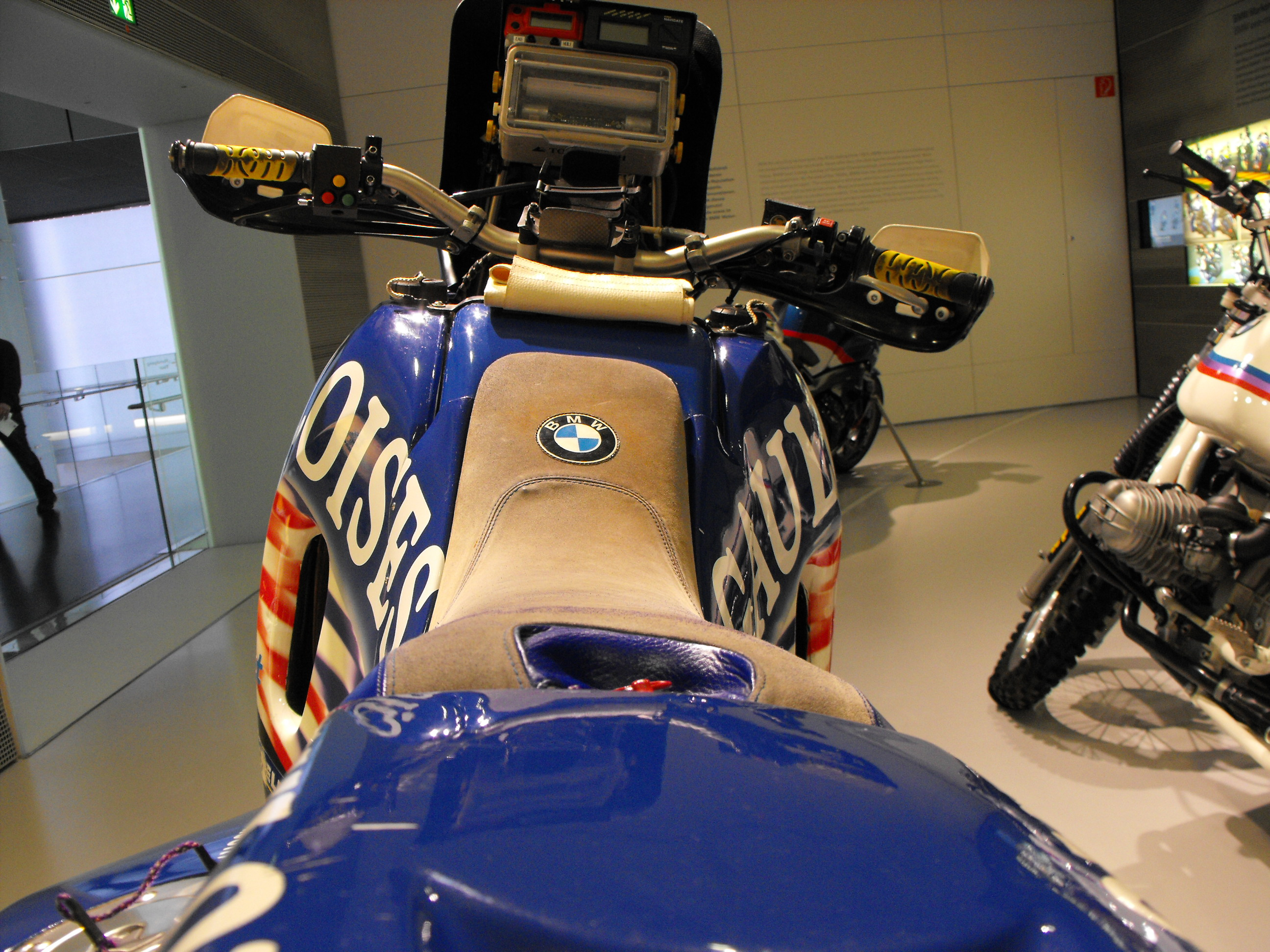
Paris-Dakar 2000 winner Richard Sainct's BMW F650RR in the BMW Museum, Munich, Germany

== R 80 G/S in motorsport ==
The R 80 G/S was developed for BMW by engineer Rüdiger Gutsche, a successful competitor in the International Six Days Trial on his specially adapted R75/5. In 1981, Hubert Auriol, riding a R 80 G/S prepared by German company HPN Motorradtechnik, won the Paris-Dakar Rally. He repeated his success on an 870 cc version of the R 80 G/S in 1983. Gaston Rahier won the Dakar on a R 80 G/S in 1984, and then again on a larger 1,000 cc engined R 80 G/S in 1985. To commemorate their success, BMW launched the R 80 G/S Paris-Dakar special edition which featured a 7 imperial gallons (32 L; 8.4 US gal) fuel tank, fitted with dual petcocks and signed by Gaston Rahier.

== Successors ==
In 1986, the R 80 G/S was joined by the R 100 GS, which had a larger capacity 980 cc engine and an updated suspension and drive unit called a Paralever. In 1987, production of the R 80 G/S ended and was succeeded by the 650 cc R 65 GS, which used the same monolever suspension and drive, and the R 80 GS, which retained the G/S engine but used the newer Paralever drive.

== Notes ==
=== References ===
- Falloon, Ian (November 2003). The BMW story: production and racing motorcycles from 1923 to the present day. Sparkford, England: Haynes Publishing. ISBN 978-1-85960-854-8.
