= BMW R100 =

R100
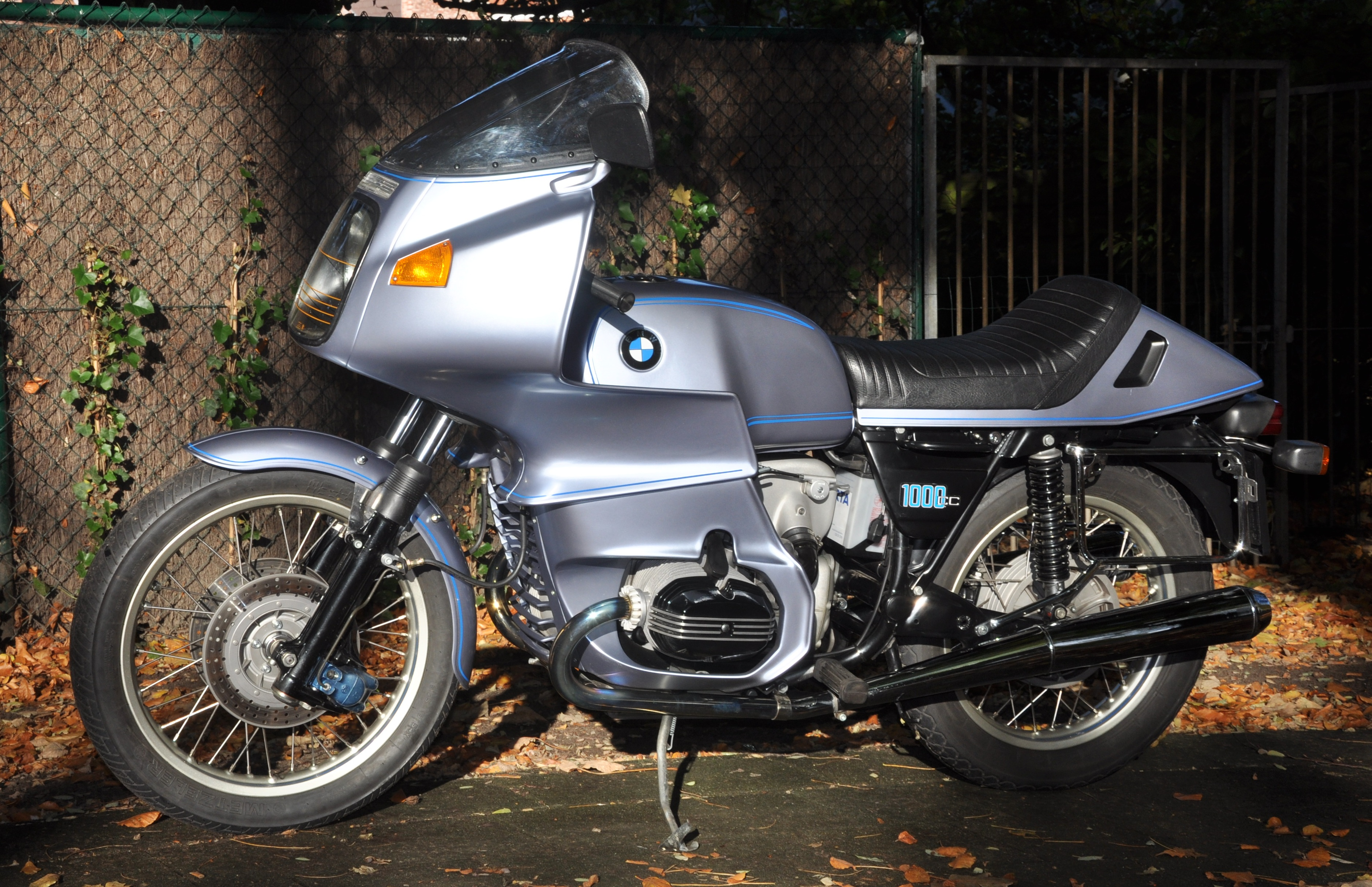
- BMW R100RS
- Manufacturer: BMW Motorrad
- Also called: Slash 7 "Airhead"
- Parent company: BMW
- Production: 1976–1996
- Predecessor: BMW /6
- Successor: BMW R1100 Series, BMW "Oilhead"
- Engine: laterally opposed 2-cylinder boxer
- Bore / stroke: 73.5 × 70.6 to 94 × 70.6
- Transmission: 5-speed

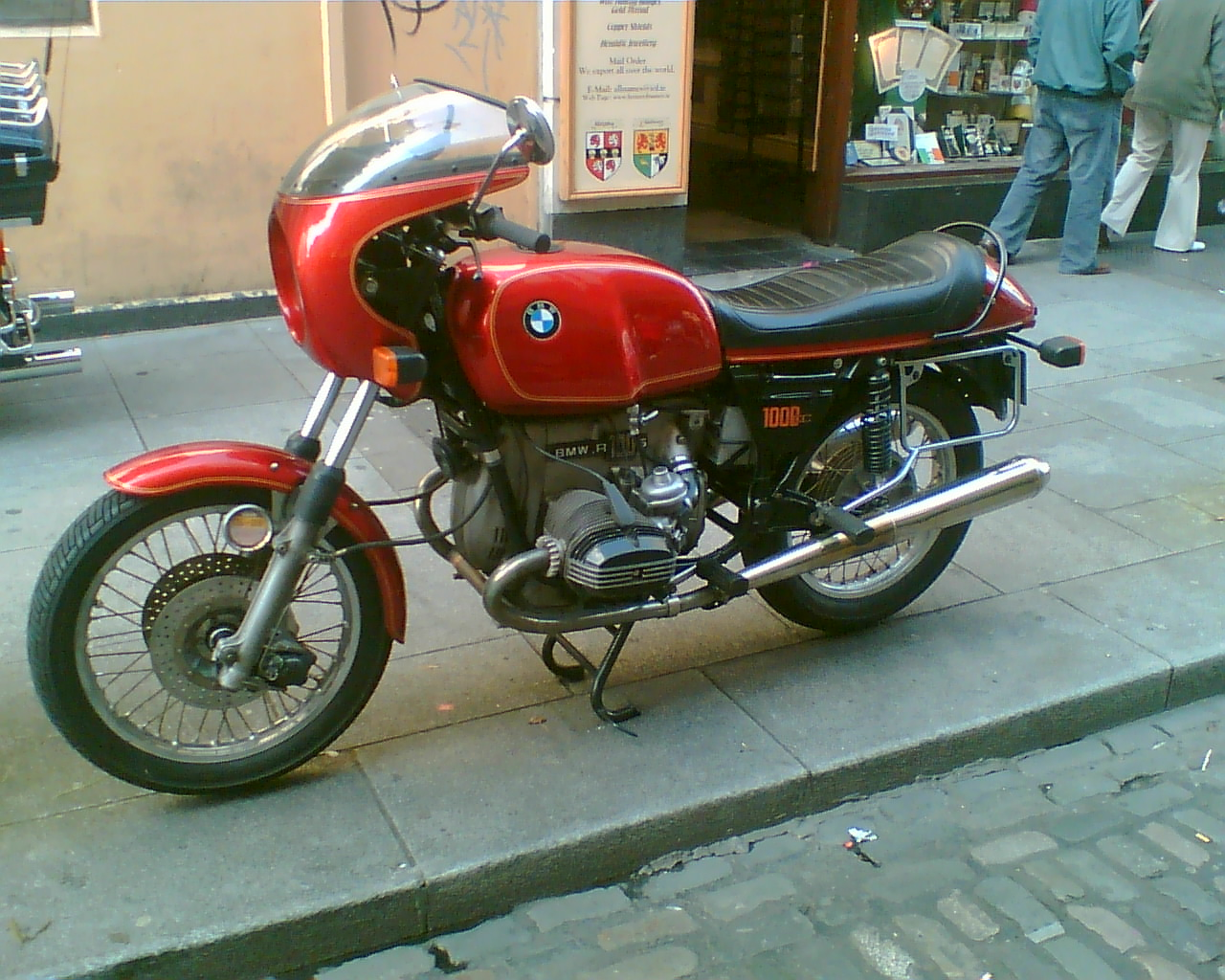
BMW R100S. This was built in Jan 1977 and is an example of a first year /7.

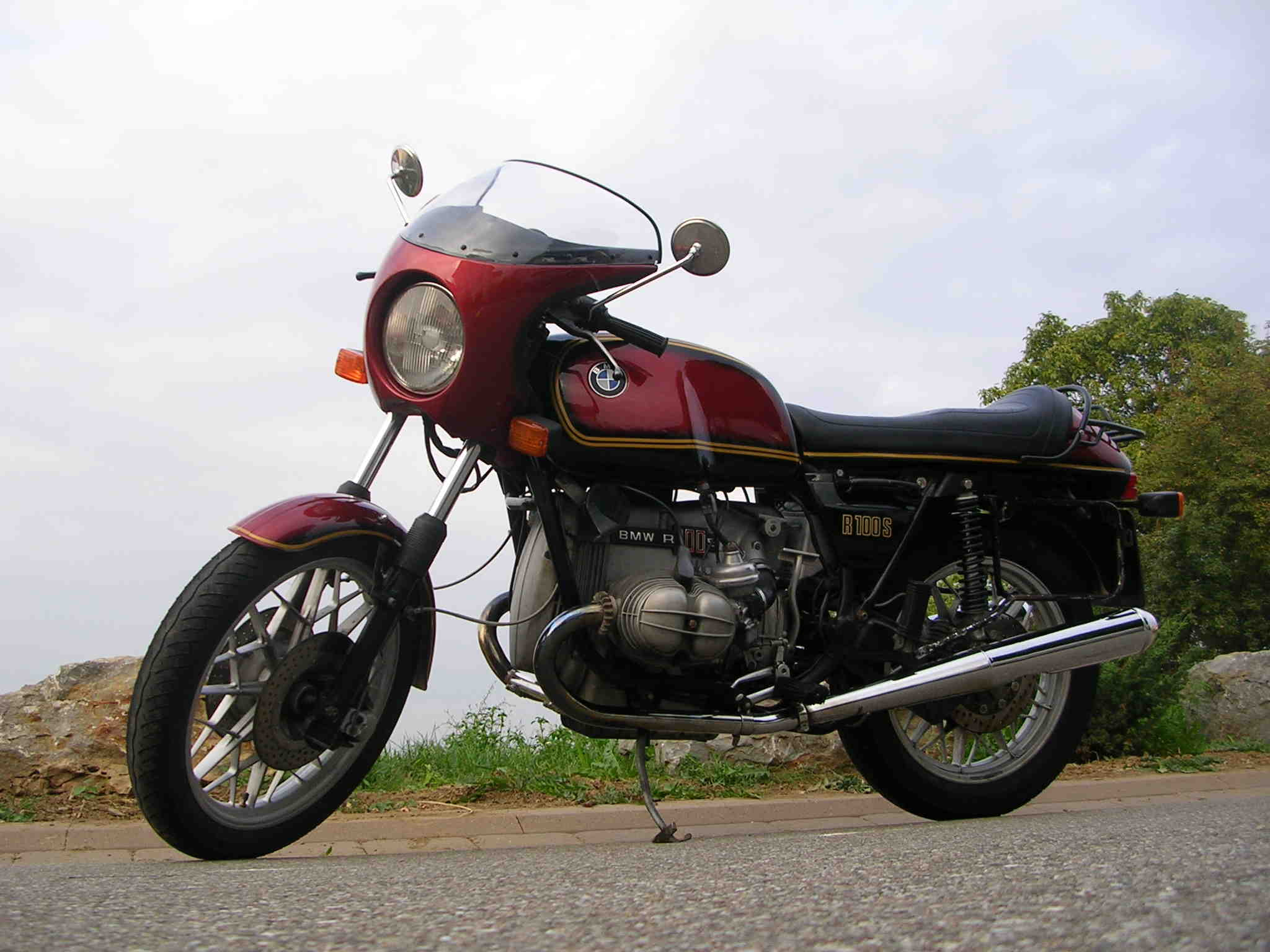
BMW R100S

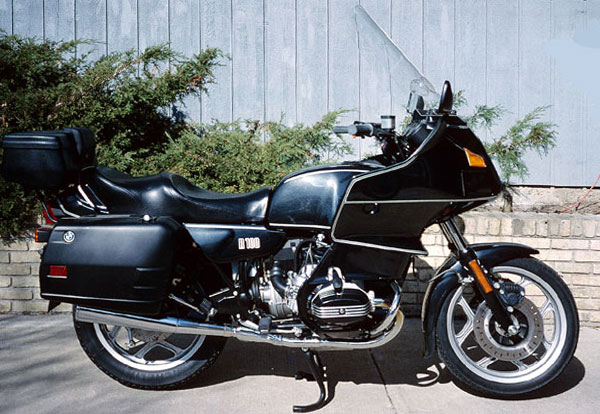
BMW R100RT Monolever

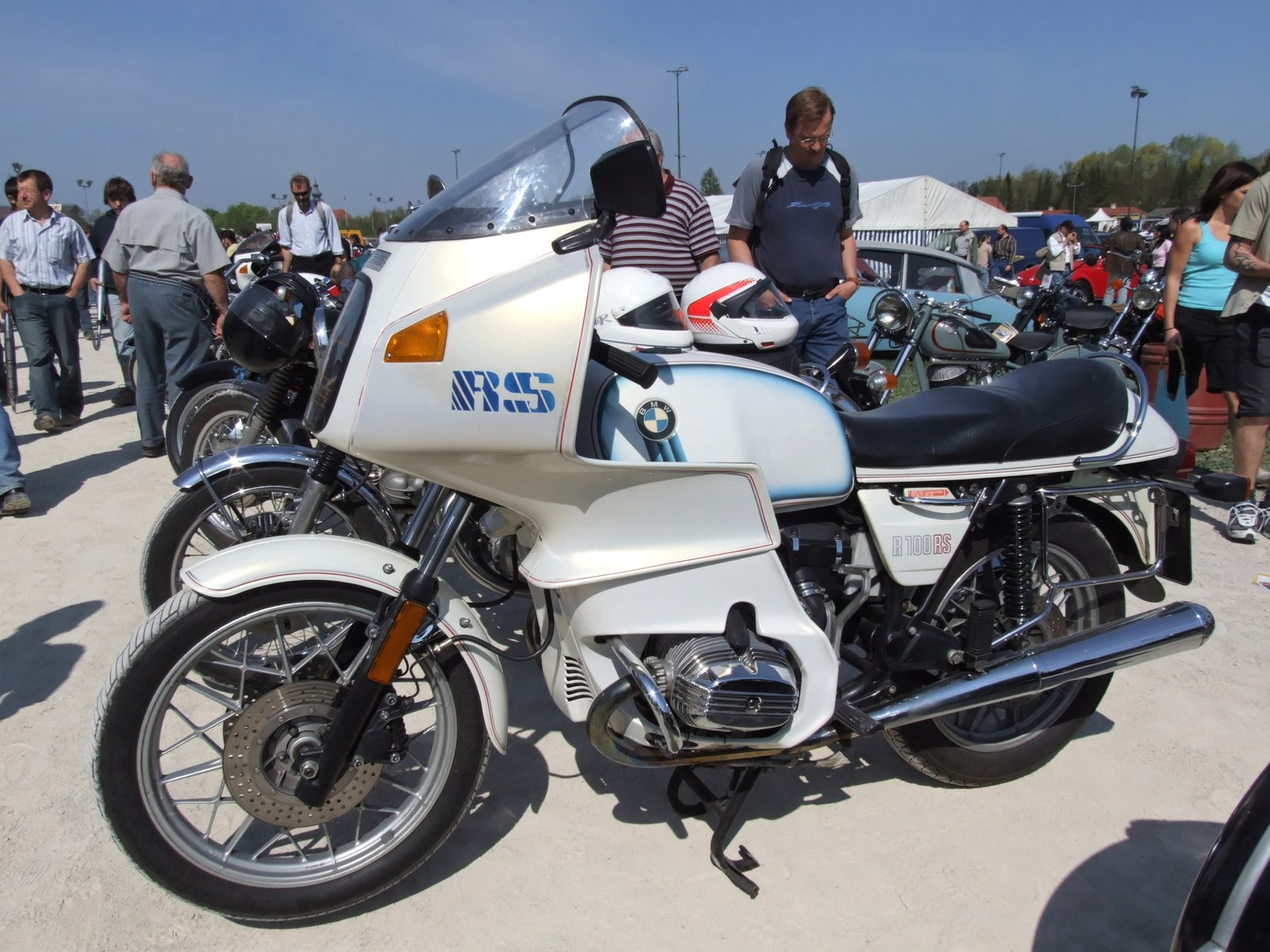
BMW R100RS

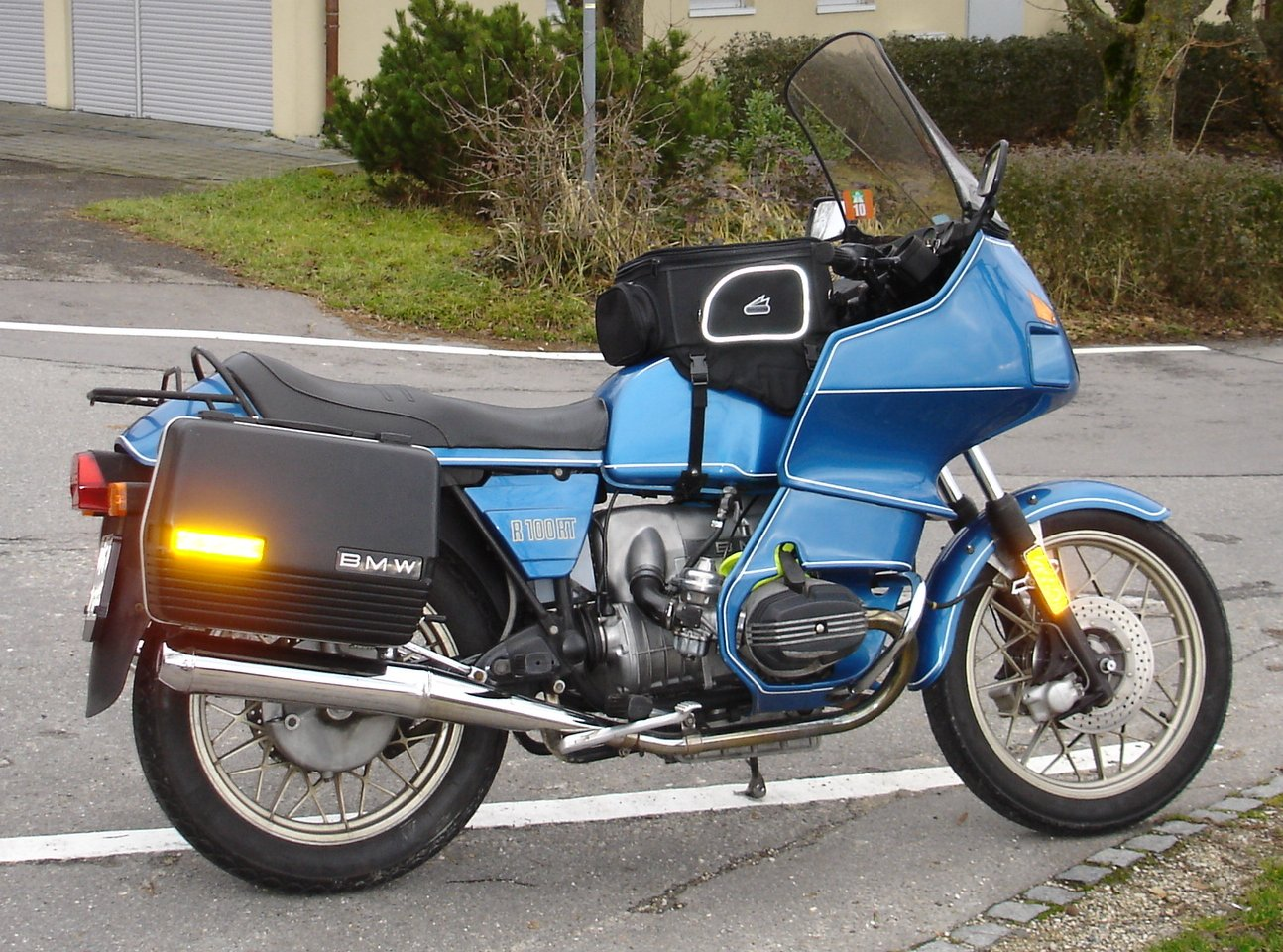
1979 BMW R100RT

BMW R100, with variant models designated by T, S, CS, RS, RS Classic, RT, RT Classic, TIC, TC, R and GS is a BMW motorcycle series, using a two-cylinder four-stroke boxer engine of 980 cc capacity. Model production began in 1976, with a premature shutdown and subsequent restart in 1985, and final completion of the series in 1996.

The last of the "airheads," this article also discusses the different /7 models of smaller displacements (R60, R75, R80).

== First (/7) and second series ==
The "slash seven" development was an evolutionary change of the BMW 247 engine from the previous "slash six" and initially constituted the R100RS (51 kW / 70 PS), R100S (48 kW / 65 PS), R100 (44 kW / 60 PS), R75/7 (37 kW / 50 PS) and R60/7 (30 kW / 40 hp).

The R100RS was the first motorcycle manufactured in volume to be fitted as standard with a frame fixed full fairing, a feature pioneered by the Vincent Black Prince. This innovation was a departure from previous touring fairings, giving birth to the modern sport touring motorcycle.

=== Brakes ===
The R100 models received a double disc brake in the front wheel. For 1976 to 1979 models the front brake was a pivot caliper ATE disc actuated from the controls via cable to a brake master cylinder under the tank. From 1980 models onwards front brakes were changed to a Brembo fixed caliper brake, and the master cylinder was moved from undertank to the right handlebar. With the introduction of Monolever models in 1986, the Brembo fixed calipers were mounted on the fork tubes. The back brake was initially a drum brake. Starting in the 1978 model year (September 1977), the R100RS, RT and S models received a Brembo rear disc brake with fixed caliper on the rear wheel, and from model year 1985 the rear drum brake returned.

=== Wheels ===
The models originally were fitted with wire spoked wheels, but in September 1977 for the 78 model year shifted to an aluminum cast "snowflake" pattern. The initial aluminum wheels were prone to breakage, prompting a BMW recall for replacement.

=== Engine and drivetrain ===
In keeping with the evolutionary development of the Boxer line, the engine was a laterally opposed 2-cylinder boxer engine with lower camshaft and overhead valves. Driving the camshaft was a duplex (later simplex) chain with a spring-loaded chain tensioner. The clutch was a single dry plate with cable actuation. A 5-speed manual transmission, with an optional kickstarter for the early models, and shaft drive to the rear wheel completed the drivetrain.

=== Carburetor ===
A constant velocity 40mm carburetor was supplied by Bing (Type 94). Starting in 1980, an emissions control system was implemented in various countries, which reduced available horsepower by approximately 10%.

=== Suspension ===
The front forks were telescopic with a diameter of 36 mm without gaiters. 1984 and prior had a dual swing arm with two shock absorbers, model year 1986 and after used the BMW monolever, 1988 and after added the BMW paralever for r100GS, R100R and Mystik models the RS And RT continued with the monolever rear swingarm.

=== Ignition ===
Up to model year 1981, a points type high-voltage capacitor ignition was used. From 1981 onwards, an electronic ignition was fitted.

=== Specifications ===
Model	Cylinder	Bore & Stroke (mm)	Displacement (cc)	Power (HP at 1/min)	Construction	Production
BMW R60/7	2	73.5 × 70.6	599	40 / 6400	1976–1980	11,163
BMW R75/7	2	82 × 70.6	745	50 / 6200	1976–1977	6264
BMW R80/7	2	84.8 × 70.6	797	50 / 7250	1977–1983	17,703
BMW R100/7	2	94 × 70.6	980	60 / 6500	1976–1980	12,029
BMW R100S	2	94 × 70.6	980	66 / 6600	1976–1980	9657
BMW R100RS	2	94 × 70.6	980	70 / 7250	1976–1984	33,648
BMW R100RT	2	94 × 70.6	980	70 / 7250	1978–1996	?
BMW R100T	2	94 × 70.6	980	66 / 7250	1978–1980	5643
BMW R100	2	94 × 70.6	980	66 / 7000	1980–1984	10,111
BMW R100CS	2	94 × 70.6	980	70 / 7000	1980–1984	4038

== Pause and Restart ==
In the 1980s for environmental and marketing reasons, BMW initiated a move to the water-cooled K75 and K100 models to remain competitive with the technical lead of the Japanese motorcycle industry. For this purpose they wanted to give up the production of the "airhead" two-valve boxer models. This decision led to protests from customers and dealers, BMW restarted R100 production, but with modified lower output, and improved torque curve engines with 44 kW (60 hp). They later produced an 800 cc version with 37 kW (50 hp).

Starting in 1985, the road versions were equipped with a single-sided swingarm (Monolever). From 1988 Paralever rear suspension was introduced, first in the GS models R80G/S (later redesignated "R80GS") and R100GS, and later in the road versions R80R, R100R and in 1994 the R100 Mystic.

== Sources ==
- Hans-Jürgen Schneider: BMW R 45 – R 100 RS ab Baujahr 1976: alle Modelle mit Zweizylinder-Boxermotor; Technik, Wartung, Reparatur BLV Auto- und Motorradpraxis, München Wien Zürich 1984, ISBN 3-405-12908-7.
- Don Morley, Mick Woollett: BMW. Heel Verlag, Königswinter 1994. ISBN 3-89365-402-X.
- Hans-Joachim Mai: 1000 Tricks für schnelle BMWs. 11. Aufl. 1988, Motorbuch-Verlag, Stuttgart.
- Andy Schwietzer, Werner R. Reiss: BMW Boxer alle ab /5: BMW Zweiventiler von 1969–1985. 1. Aufl. Bodensteiner-Verlag, Wallmoden 2006, ISBN 3-9806631-4-0.
- Stefan Knittel: BMW Motorräder. Gerlingen 1984, ISBN 3-88350-152-2.
