= BMW R65 =

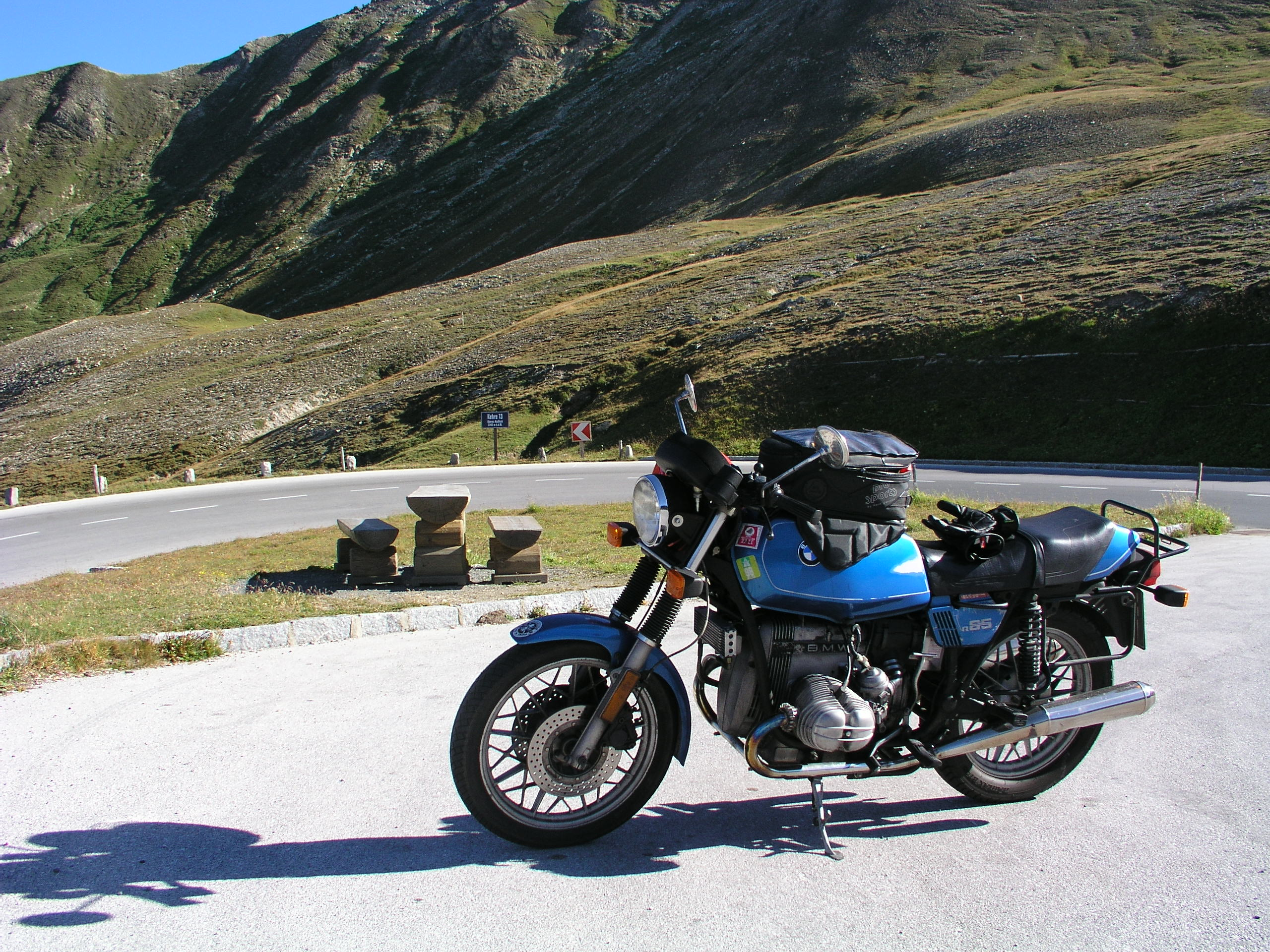
- 1981 BMW R65 on tour
- Manufacturer: BMW
- Production: 1978-84
- Class: Touring motorcycle
- Engine: 248/1
- Top speed: 175 km/h (109 mph)
- Power: 33 kW (44 hp)
- Torque: 50 N⋅m (37 lbf⋅ft)
- Weight: 205 kg (452 lb) (wet)
- Fuel capacity: 22 L (4.8 imp gal; 5.8 US gal)

The BMW R65 is a light touring motorcycle introduced by BMW in 1978 to add a mid-size motorcycle to its product line. The original R65, contrary to the views of some commentators, has the same sized frame as the larger R series motorcycles. The R65 does however have a shorter swingarm than its siblings and therefore a shorter bolt-on rear sub-frame; this, along with the shorter front forks and 18" front wheel, gives the illusion that the R65 frame is smaller. The initial model R65 was manufactured until 1984. In 1985 the R65's engine was put into the same frame and suspension as the R80 which featured a single rear shock absorber (mono-shock). Additionally, between 1981 and 1984, the R65LS was manufactured. This R65 variant has a small triangular fairing that was designed by Hans Muth.

== Technical overview ==
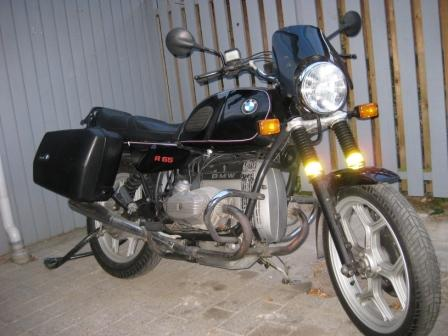
1987 BMW R65 Monolever

The R65 is fitted with a type 248/1 engine, a different version of the well known BMW type 247, also known as an airhead. The engine is a 648 cc, OHV, two valves per cylinder, air-cooled flat-twin (i.e., horizontally opposed cylinders) or "boxer" engine (652Vb). The R65 weighs 205 kg (455 lb) with a full tank of fuel and has a five speed gearbox connected to a shaft final drive. From 1981 on, the R65 was fitted with breaker-less electronic ignition. This further improved the already good reliability of the bike.

Following standard BMW practice of the time, two 32 mm Bing CV carburettors were used and the R65 used a single dry plate clutch. An additional lower powered version 27 hp (652Vc) was also produced for the German market and was fitted with 26 mm Bing CV carburettors.

The R65 features a smaller fuel tank than other larger BMW airheads, with a 22 litres (4.8 imp gal; 5.8 US gal) capacity which includes a 0.5 gallon reserve.

The monolever version of the bike was produced from 1985 until 1993.

== R65LS ==
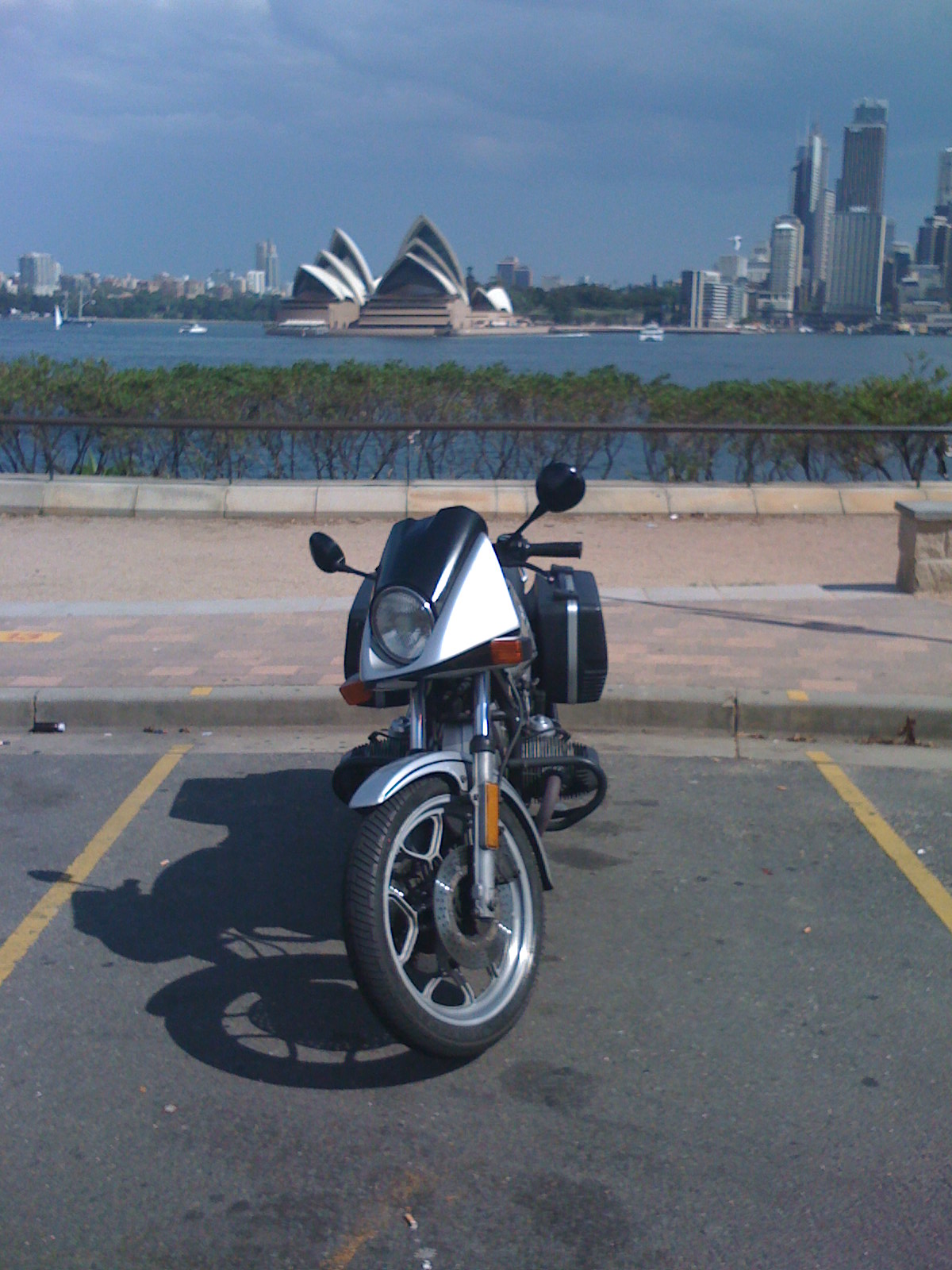
Front view of a 1984 BMW R65LS with triangular pod fairing

In 1982 the R65LS designed by Hans Muth was introduced. 6,389 R65LS models were produced, with a triangular shaped pod fairing and instrument housing and a different rear seat with pillion grab handles similar in style to the then-imminent K Series BMWs. Hennarot (red) paint with white 18 in (460 mm) alloy wheels or Polaris silber (silver) with silver wheels and different model transfers were used. Much of the chrome work of the R65 was replaced by black painted or black chrome features (exhaust piping and mufflers). Other features included:

- Twin disc front brakes in-lieu of single disc
- Lower handlebars
- Different alloy wheel pattern
- Different rear drum brake size

== R65GS ==
In 1987, the R65GS was released, to become a member of the GS family of dual-sport bikes. The R65GS, of which 1,727 were produced, featured the R65 engine fitted into a R80G/S chassis with a monolever combined drive/swingarm and single shock absorber.

== Performance ==
The power output of early R65 models was 33 kW (44 hp) but from 1981 this increased to 37 kW (50 hp) at 7,250 rpm Similarly in 1981 torque rose from 50 N⋅m (37 ft⋅lbf) at 5,500 rpm to 52.3 N⋅m (38.6 ft⋅lbf) at 6,500 rpm. This propelled both variants from 0–100 km/h (0–62 mph) in 5.8 seconds. The R65 could do the standing 400 metres (quarter mile) in 14.3 seconds and the standing kilometre (0.6 mile) in 28.1 seconds. The top speed of both variants was 175 km/h (109 mph). The lower powered version for the German market produced 27 hp (20 kW). Handling on the R65 is very nimble due to better frame geometry combined with a shorter wheelbase.

Tools and owner servicing were well thought out. The R65 came standard with a full tool kit, as well as a hand-operated tire pump. Owner maintenance is standard practice with these machines. Valve lash was adjusted by a simple set screw-and-locknut arrangement, and timing was taken care of by adjustment of the points' housing. On later models (i.e., model year 1981 onward), the points were no longer used and a Hall sensor was placed inside the housing, this housing behind the front engine cover is colloquially known as the 'bean can'. Most other maintenance tasks were easily achieved due to easy access to most mechanicals.
