= BMW 247 engine =

Air-cooled flat-twin motorcycle engine by BMW

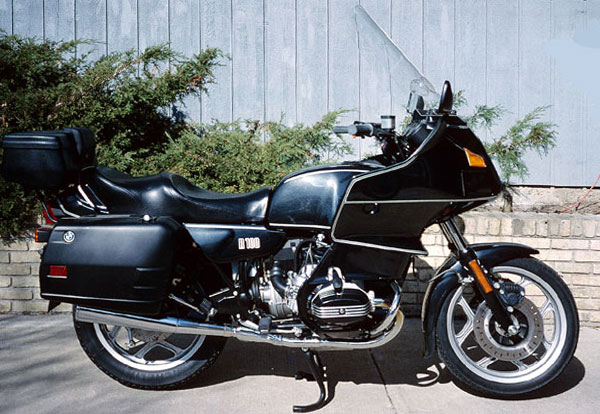
1994 BMW R100RT with type 247 engine

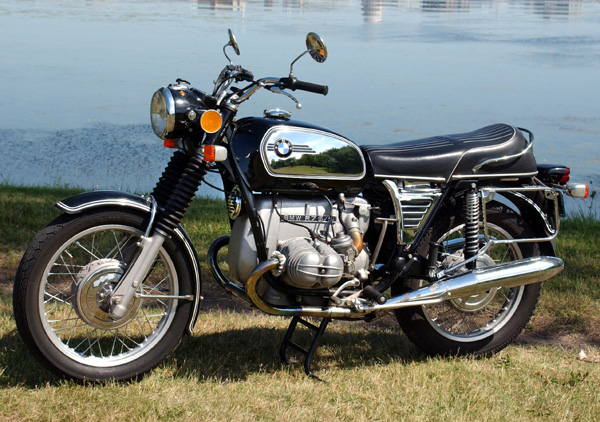
1973½ BMW R75/5 with type 247 engine

The BMW 247 engine is an air-cooled flat-twin motorcycle engine with two valves per cylinder, commonly known as the "airhead" boxer. Introduced for the 1974 model year, the 247 engine succeeded the BMW 246 engine used in the /5 series. With minor and major updates (such as the 247/76 in 1976 and 247/M80 in 1981), it was used in BMW Motorrad motorcycles from 1974 until 1995.

Before 1981, the engine used points ignition. Starting in 1981 with the R80G/S, BMW introduced electronic ignition, Nikasil-coated cylinders, and a lighter flywheel.

A number of different model variants were produced:

- CS (Classic Sport): Equipped with a 1,000 cc (61 cu in) engine.
- GS (Gelände/Straße): Off-road/street model that won multiple Dakar Rally events.
- RS (Renn Sport): Fairing-equipped sports touring model.
- RT (Road Touring): Full touring model.
- S (Sport): Featured on models such as the BMW R90S.
- ST (Straße): A road-styled version of the G/S featuring an 800 cc (49 cu in) engine.

Following the Type 247 engine, BMW built smaller-capacity air-cooled flat-twin engines known as the Type 248/1, used in the R45, R65, and R65LS. In 1993, BMW succeeded the Type 247 with a partially oil-cooled four-valve design known as the "oilhead".
