= BMW /5 motorcycles =

- Manufacturer: BMW
- Also called: R50/5, R60/5, and R75/5
- Production: 1969-1973
- Assembly: Berlin, Germany
- Engine: 498–749 cc (30.4–45.7 cu in)
- Bore / stroke: 67.0 mm (2.64 in), 73.5 mm (2.89 in), 82.0 mm × 70.6 mm (3.23 in × 2.78 in)
- Top speed: 110mph
- Power: 32-50hp
- Torque: 29-43ft⋅lbf
- Transmission: 4-speed
- Suspension: Modular
- Brakes: Front/Rear Drum Brake
- Tires: 3.25x19 front • 4.00x18 rear
- Wheelbase: 1385 mm
- Dimensions: L: 2100 mm W: 850 mm H: 1040 mm
- Weight: 462 lbs (wet)
- Fuel capacity: 4.7 US gal

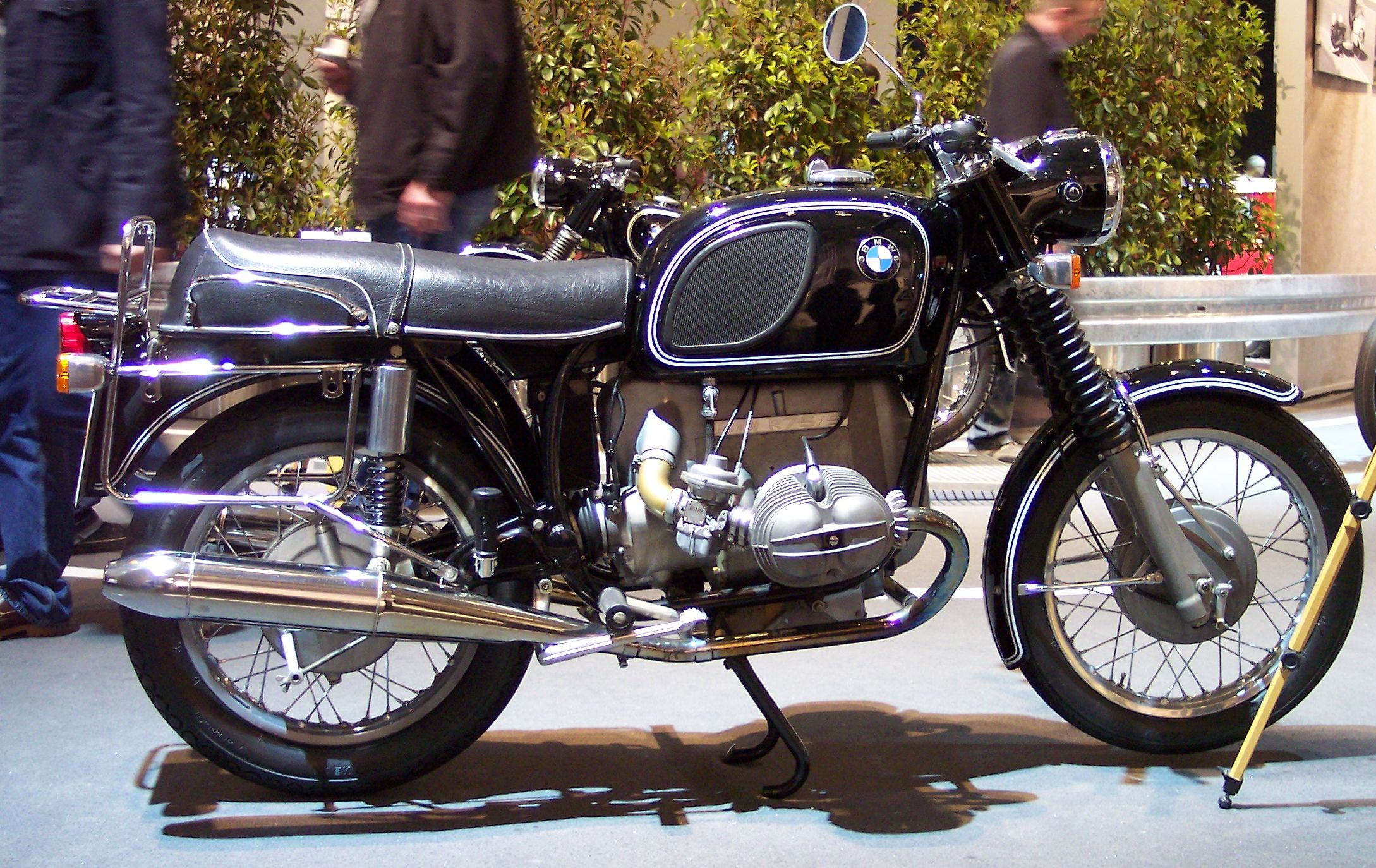
BMW R75/5

For the WWII-era motorcycle, see BMW R75

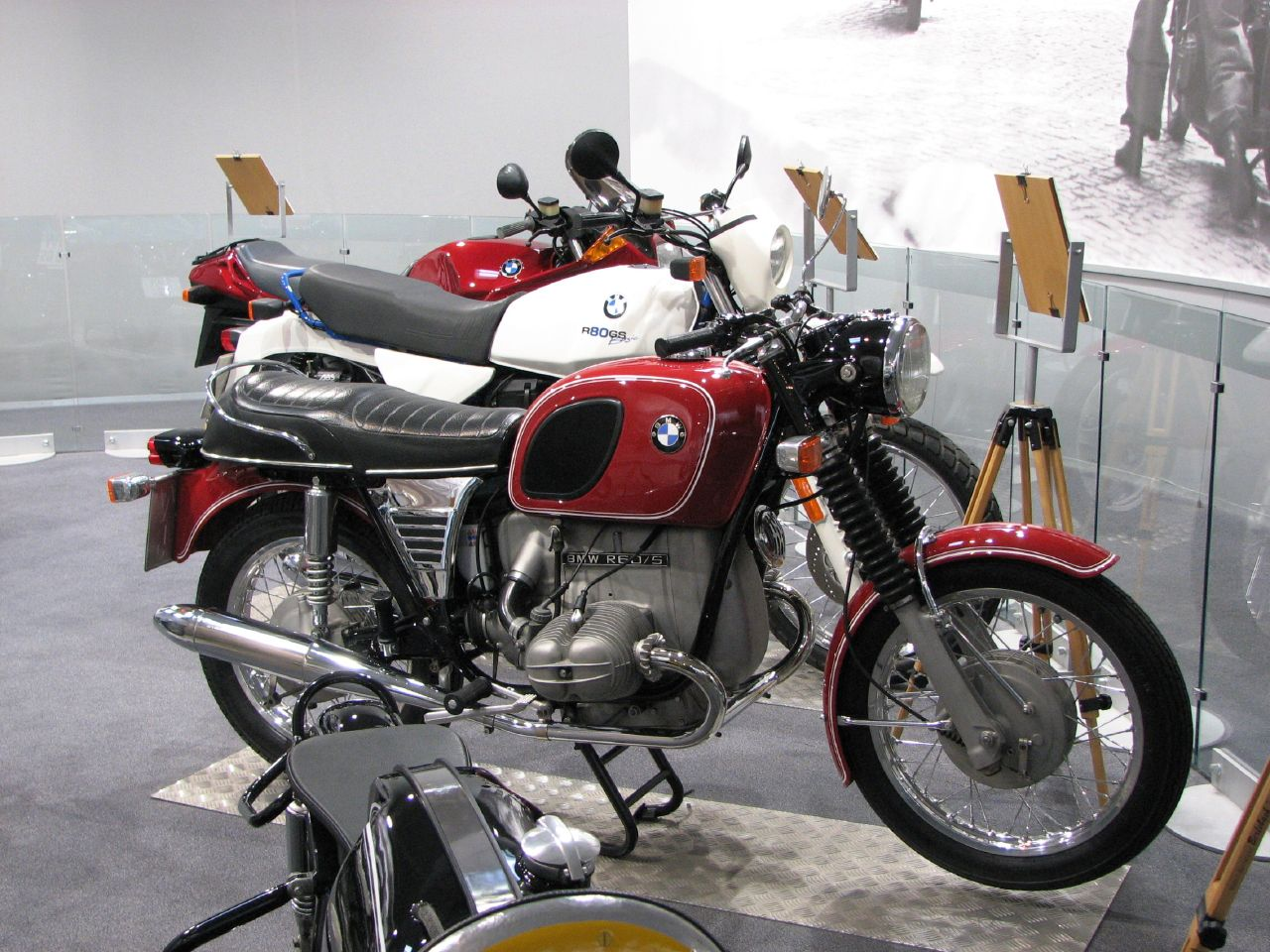
BMW R60/5 (with BMW R80GS behind)

The BMW R50/5, R60/5, and R75/5 form a range of boxer twin motorcycles manufactured in Berlin, Germany, by BMW for model years 1970-1973 and featuring electric starting and telescopic forks.

== History ==
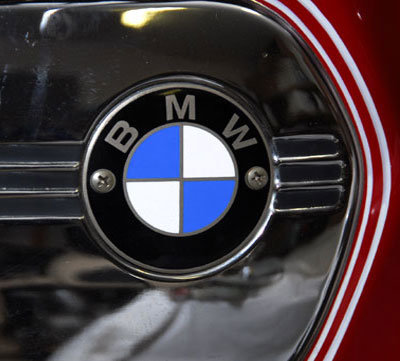
R75/5 tank roundel

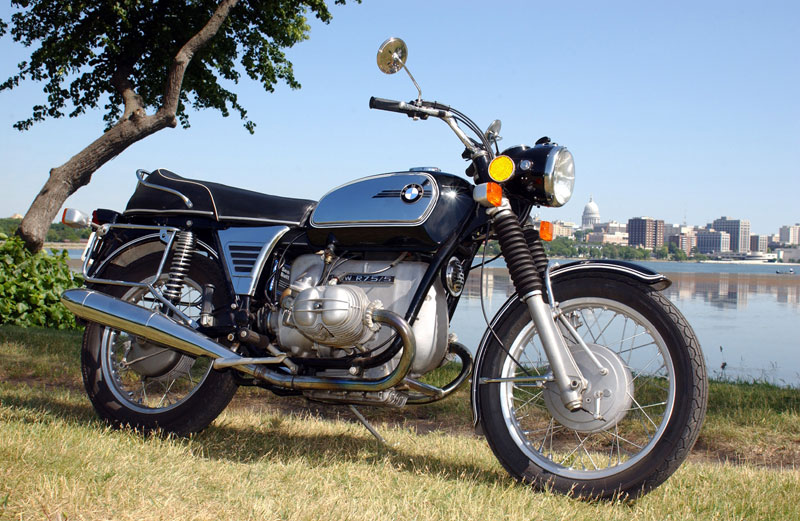
BMW R75/5 with "toaster" side-panels

For the 1970 model year, BMW launched three new models having engine capacities of 500 cc (R50/5), 600 cc (R60/5), and 750 cc (R75/5). The R75/5 could reach 110 mph (177 km/h). Model year 1972 saw the introduction of the 15 L (3.3 imp gal; 4.0 US gal) rectangular tank with chrome side panels. For the second half of the 1973 model year, BMW lengthened the rear swingarm 2 inch (5 cm), resulting in the “long-wheelbase” (LWB) models mainly to improve the stability of the motorcycles at higher speeds and when loaded up. It also enabled a larger battery, while retaining the kick starter.

The /5 series was the first series to be manufactured completely in Berlin, as by 1969 all of Munich's production capacity was needed for automobiles. Berlin with its well-trained workforce was an obvious choice. So in 1969 the Berlin Plant started production of the all-new BMW /5 Series, a completely new design and construction following a modular principle all the way from the suspension to the flat-twin power unit.

In 1970, 12,287 units were manufactured and by July 1973, when the /5 model series reached the end production, a significant volume of 68,956 motorcycles had left the Berlin Plant, production increasing five-fold within three years. During this period, BMW manufactured its 500,000th.

In 1974, BMW introduced the “/6” models, which offered front disc brake, revised instrumentation, and a five-speed transmission. The single disc brake was a hybrid cable/hydraulic system, whereby a cable from the handlebar lever actuated the master cylinder underneath the fuel tank. The rectangular tank was dropped.

All /5 models featured both electric starter and kickstarter, with kickstarters remaining available on some BMW motorcycles up to model year 1980.

== Technical data ==
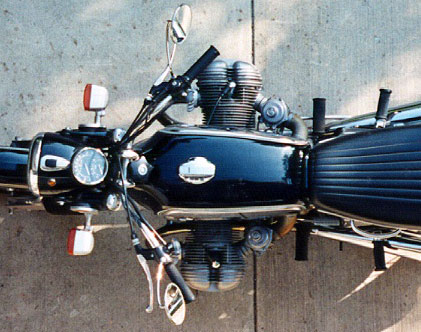
Boxer engine showing offset cylinders

The /5 models are air-cooled, four-stroke, opposed-twin (boxer) engines with hemispherical combustion chambers. The engine is built around a one-piece tunnel crank-case. The camshaft is driven by a duplex chain and is located below the crankshaft (unlike the /2 series which had the gear-driven camshaft above the crank). This reversed arrangement improves ground clearance for the same center of gravity and assists lubrication of the camshaft. Valves are actuated by the camshaft through hardened followers, push rods, and rocker arms.

The 500 cc and 600 cc models are equipped with Bing slide-type carburetors with 26 mm throats. The R75/5 comes with 32 mm Bing CV (Constant Vacuum/constant depression) type carburetors. As in all BMW motorcycles at the time, the clutch is a single-disk dry clutch.

Final drive is by shaft, running from the transmission by universal joint to an oil bath within the right rear swing arm and connecting to a bevel gear and ring gear on the other end. Unlike the /2 models (with the exception of the 1968-69 US models), the /5 models are equipped with telescopic front forks, 12-volt alternator and electrics, and standard tachometer and turn signals.

	R 50/5	R 60/5	R 75/5
Bore	67 mm (2.6 in)	73.5 mm (2.89 in)	82 mm (3.2 in)
Stroke	70.6 mm (2.78 in)		
Displacement	498 cc (30.4 cu in)	599 cc (36.6 cu in)	749 cc (45.7 cu in)
Power	32 hp (24 kW) @ 6,800 rpm	40 hp (30 kW) @ 6,600 rpm	50 hp (37 kW) @ 6,400 rpm
Torque	29 ft⋅lbf (39 N⋅m) @ 5,000 rpm	36 ft⋅lbf (49 N⋅m) @ 5,000 rpm	43 ft⋅lbf (58 N⋅m) @ 5,000 rpm
Top Speed	87 mph (140 km/h)	99 mph (159 km/h)	110 mph (175 km/h)
Curb Weight	452 lb (205 kg)	463 lb (210 kg)	463 lb (210 kg)
Gross Weight Rating	881 lb (400 kg)		
Alternator	Bosch 12 V • 180 Watts		
Spark Plugs	Bosch W230T30 / Champion N7Y		
Fuel Tank	4.7 US gal (18 L; 3.9 imp gal) or 6.3 US gal (24 L; 5.2 imp gal)		
Tires	3.25x19 front • 4.00x18 rear		
Rims	1.85x19 front • 1.85x18 rear		

Dimensions	Dimensions/Weights
Dimensions/Weights Length x Width x Height	Dimensions/Weights 2100 (from 1973: 2150) x 850 x 1040 mm (82.67 (84.64) x 33.46 x 40.94 in)
Dimensions/Weights Wheel Base	Dimensions/Weights 1385 mm / 54.52 in (from 1973: 1435 mm / 56.49 in)

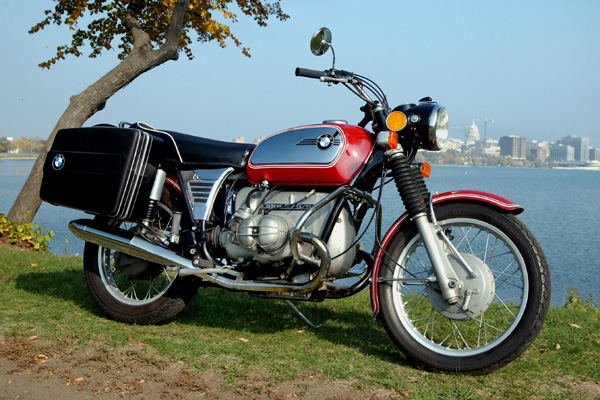
BMW R75/5 with pannier

== See also ==
- History of BMW motorcycles
- Motorcycle Types
