= European emission standards =

Vehicle emission standards

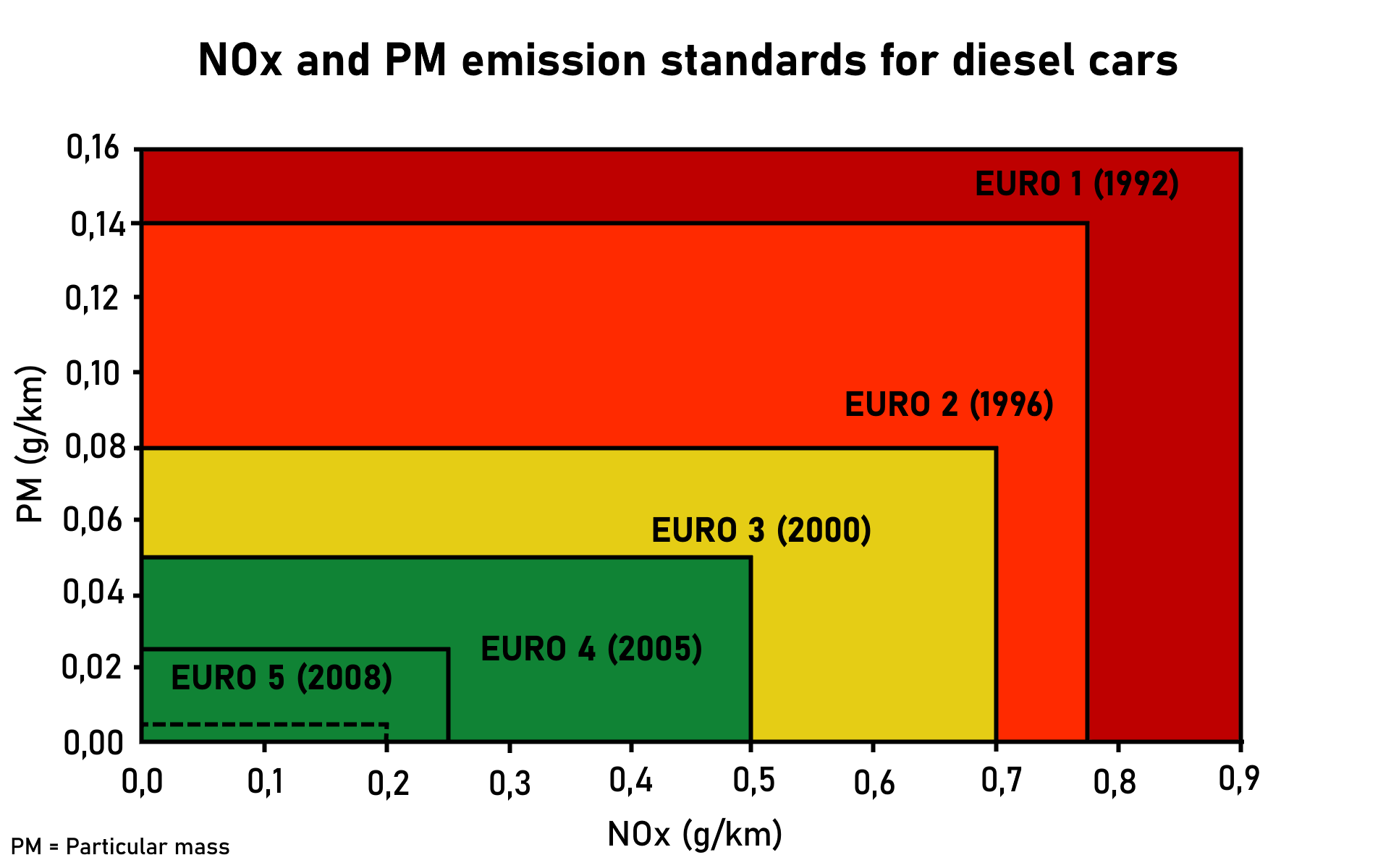
Simplified chart showing the progression of European emission standards for diesel cars

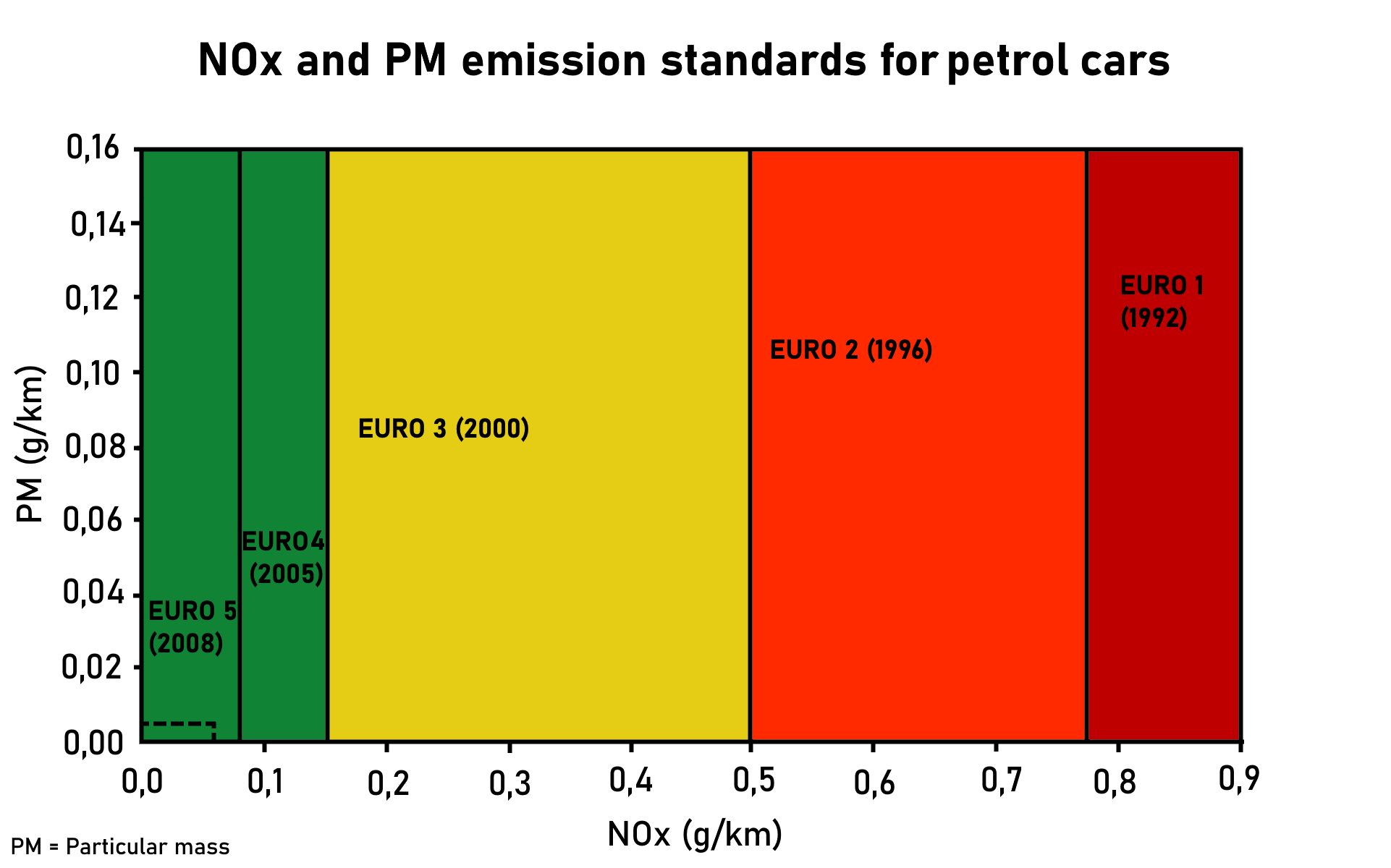
Simplified chart showing the progression of the standards for petrol cars. Until Euro 5, there were no limits on particulate matter.

The European emission standards are vehicle emission standards that regulate pollution from the use of new land vehicles sold in the European Union and European Economic Area member states and the United Kingdom, and ships in European territorial waters. These standards target air pollution from exhaust gases, brake dust, and tyre rubber pollution, and are defined through a series of European Union directives that progressively introduced stricter limits to reduce environmental impact.

Euro 7, agreed in 2024 and came into force in 2026, includes non-exhaust emissions such as particulates from tyres and brakes. Until 2030 fossil fueled vehicles are allowed to have dirtier brakes than electric vehicles.

== Background ==
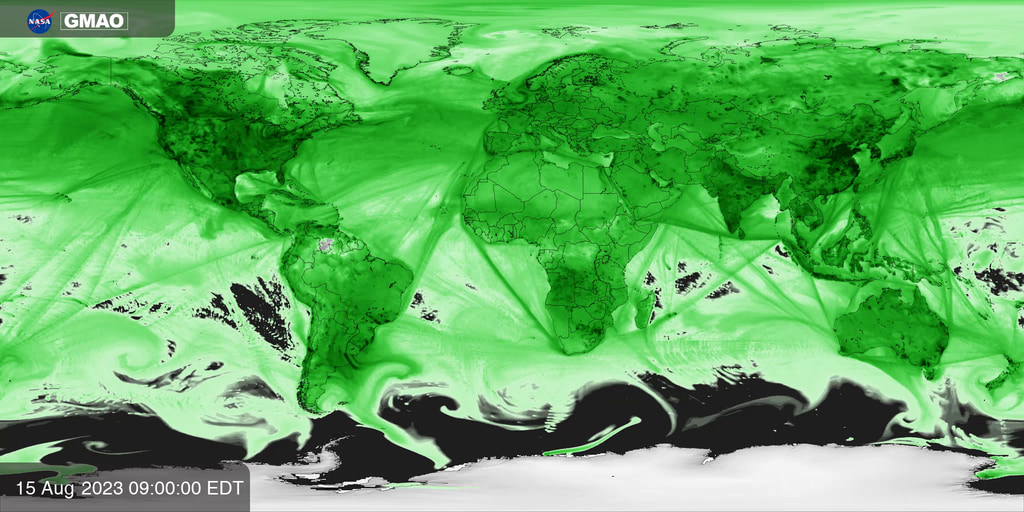
Near surface concentration of NO_{x} in September 2023

In the European Union, emissions of nitrogen oxides (NO_{x}), total hydrocarbon (THC), non-methane hydrocarbons (NMHC), carbon monoxide (CO) and particulate matter (PM) are regulated for most vehicle types, including cars, trucks (lorries), locomotives, tractors and similar machinery, barges, but excluding seagoing ships and aeroplanes. For each vehicle type, different standards apply. Compliance is determined by running the engine at a standardised test cycle. Non-compliant vehicles cannot be sold in the EU, but new standards do not apply to vehicles already on the roads. No use of specific technologies is mandated to meet the standards, though available technology is considered when setting the standards. New models introduced must meet current or planned standards, but minor lifecycle model revisions may continue to be offered with pre-compliant engines.

Along with emissions standards, the European Union has also mandated a number of computer on-board diagnostics for the purposes of increasing safety for drivers. These standards are used in relation to the emissions standards.

During the early 2000s, Australia began harmonising Australian Design Rule certification for new motor vehicle emissions with Euro categories. Euro III was introduced on 1 January 2006 and is progressively being introduced to align with European introduction dates.

Euro 7 was formally approved by EU countries in April 2024.

== Toxic emission: stages and legal framework ==
The stages are typically referred to as Euro 1, Euro 2, Euro 3, Euro 4, Euro 5, Euro 6 and Euro 7 for Light Duty Vehicle standards.

The legal framework consists in a series of directives, each amendments to the 1970 Directive 70/220/EEC. The following is a summary list of the standards, when they come into force, what they apply to, and which EU directives provide the definition of the standard.

- Euro 1 (1992):
  - For passenger cars—91/441/EEC.
  - Also for passenger cars and light lorries—93/59/EEC.
- Euro 2 (1996) for passenger cars—94/12/EC (& 96/69/EC)
  - For motorcycle—2002/51/EC (row A)—2006/120/EC
- Euro 3 (2000) for any vehicle—98/69/EC
  - For motorcycle—2002/51/EC (row B)—2006/120/EC
- Euro 4 (2005) for any vehicle—98/69/EC (& 2002/80/EC)
- Euro 5 (2009) for light passenger and commercial vehicles—715/2007/EC
- Euro 6 (2014) for light passenger and commercial vehicles—459/2012/EC and 2016/646/EU
- Euro 7 (2026) for light- and heavy-duty vehicles—2024/1257/EU

These limits supersede the original directive on emission limits 70/220/EEC.

The classifications for vehicle category are defined by:

- Commission Directive 2001/116/EC of 20 December 2001, adapting to technical progress Council Directive 70/156/EEC on the approximation of the laws of the Member States relating to the type-approval of motor vehicles and their trailers
- Directive 2002/24/EC of the European Parliament and of the Council of 18 March 2002 relating to the type-approval of two or three-wheeled motor vehicles and repealing Council Directive 92/61/EEC

=== Emission standards for passenger cars ===
Emission standards for passenger cars and light commercial vehicles are summarized in the following tables. Since the Euro 2 stage, EU regulations introduce different emission limits for diesel and petrol vehicles. Diesels have more stringent CO standards but are allowed higher NO_{x} emissions. Petrol-powered vehicles are exempted from particulate matter (PM) standards through to the Euro 4 stage, but vehicles with direct injection engines are subject to a limit of 0.0045 g/km for Euro 5 and Euro 6. A particulate number standard (P) or (PN) has been introduced in 2011 with Euro 5b for diesel engines and, in 2014, with Euro 6 for petrol engines.

From a technical perspective, European emissions standards do not reflect everyday usage of the vehicle as manufacturers are allowed to lighten the vehicle by removing the back seats, improve aerodynamics by taping over grilles and door handles, or reduce the load on the generator by switching off the headlights, the passenger compartment fan, or simply disconnecting the alternator which charges the battery.

European emission standards for passenger cars (Category M), (Note: Before Euro 5, passenger vehicles > 2,500 kg were type approved as light commercial vehicles N_{1} Class I) g/km
Tier	Date (type approval)	Date (first registration)	CO	THC	NMHC	NO_{x}	HC+NO_{x}	PM	PN [#/km]	Brake PM_{10} (Note: Brake particle emissions (PM_{10}). Only regulated for M1, N1 vehicles and only as PM – not PN. After 2035 the limit drops to 0.003. HDV will still not be subject to brake particle emissions regulation even after 2035.)
Diesel
Euro 1 (Note: Values in parentheses are conformity of production (COP) limits)	July 1992	January 1993	2.72 (3.16)	–	–	–	0.97 (1.13)	0.14 (0.18)	–	–
Euro 2	January 1996	January 1997	1.0	–	–	–	0.7	0.08	–	–
Euro 3	January 2000	January 2001	0.66	–	–	0.500	0.56	0.05	–	–
Euro 4	January 2005	January 2006	0.50	–	–	0.250	0.30	0.025	–	–
Euro 5a	September 2009	January 2011	0.50	–	–	0.180	0.230	0.005	–	–
Euro 5b	September 2011	January 2013	0.50	–	–	0.180	0.230	0.0045	6×10^{11}	–
Euro 6b	September 2014	September 2015	0.50	–	–	0.080	0.170	0.0045	6×10^{11}	–
Euro 6c	–	September 2018	0.50	–	–	0.080	0.170	0.0045	6×10^{11}	–
Euro 6d-Temp	September 2017	September 2019	0.50	–	–	0.080	0.170	0.0045	6×10^{11}	–
Euro 6d	January 2020	January 2021	0.50	–	–	0.080	0.170	0.0045	6×10^{11}	–
Euro 6e	September 2023	September 2024	0.50	–	–	0.080	0.170	0.0045	6×10^{11}	–
Euro 6e-bis	January 2025	January 2026	0.50	–	–	0.080	0.170	0.0045	6×10^{11}	–
Euro 7	November 2026	November 2027	0.50	–	–	0.080	0.170	0.0045	6×10^{11} (Note: Particles before Euro 7 were counted if they were above 23 nm, whereas Euro 7 changes this measurement to 10 nm.)	0.007
Petrol
Euro 1	July 1992	January 1993	2.72 (3.16)	–	–	–	0.97 (1.13)	–	–	–
Euro 2	January 1996	January 1997	2.2	–	–	–	0.5	–	–	–
Euro 3	January 2000	January 2001	2.3	0.20	–	0.150	–	–	–	–
Euro 4	January 2005	January 2006	1.0	0.10	–	0.080	–	–	–	–
Euro 5a	September 2009	January 2011	1.0	0.10	0.068	0.060	–	0.005 (Note: Applies only to vehicles with direct injection engines)	–	–
Euro 5b	September 2011	January 2013	1.0	0.10	0.068	0.060	–	0.0045	–	–
Euro 6b	September 2014	September 2015	1.0	0.10	0.068	0.060	–	0.0045	6×10^{11} (Note: 6×10^{12}/km within first three years from Euro 6b effective dates)	–
Euro 6c	–	September 2018	1.0	0.10	0.068	0.060	–	0.0045	6×10^{11}	–
Euro 6d-Temp	September 2017	September 2019	1.0	0.10	0.068	0.060	–	0.0045	6×10^{11}	–
Euro 6d	January 2020	January 2021	1.0	0.10	0.068	0.060	–	0.0045	6×10^{11}	–
Euro 6e	September 2023	September 2024	1.0	0.10	0.068	0.060	–	0.0045	6×10^{11}	–
Euro 6e-bis	January 2025	January 2026	1.0	0.10	0.068	0.060	–	0.0045	6×10^{11}	–
Euro 7	November 2026	November 2027	1.0	0.10	0.068	0.060	–	0.0045	6×10^{11}	0.007
Electric
Euro 7	November 2026	November 2027	–	–	–	–	–	–	–	0.003

=== Emission standards for motorcycles (two- and three-wheelers) – Category L ===
The Euro emissions regulations for two- and three-wheelers (motorcycles) were first introduced in 1999 — some seven years after the cars were first regulated. In further difference to passenger cars (where three-way catalytic converters were de facto required from Euro I), it was first with the introduction of the Euro III emissions standard in 2006 that motorcycles were de facto required to use three-way catalytic converters. With the introduction of Euro V, standard two-stroke engine motorcycles are challenged by the strict HC and PM emissions limits. It is expected that technologies such as direct injection, combined with petrol particulate filters, could be needed for these motorcycle engine types to meet the Euro V demands.

European emission standards for two- and three-wheelers (Category L), g/km
Tier	Date	CO	NO_{x}	HC	PM	NMHC
Euro I	1999	13.0	0.3	3.0		
Euro II	2003	5.5	0.3	1.0		
Euro III	2006	2.0	0.15	0.3		
Euro IV	2016	1.14	0.09	0.17		
Euro V	2020	1.00	0.06	0.10	0.0045	0.068
Euro V+	2024	1.00	0.06	0.10	0.0045	0.068

=== Emission standards for light commercial vehicles ===
European emission standards for light commercial vehicles ≤ 1,305 kg reference mass (Category N_{1} Class I), g/km
Tier	Date (type approval)	Date (first registration)	CO	THC	NMHC	NO_{x}	HC+NO_{x}	PM	PN [#/km]	Brake PM_{10}
Diesel
Euro 1	October 1993	October 1994	2.72	–	–	–	0.97	0.14	–	–
Euro 2	January 1997	October 1997	1.0	–	–	–	0.7	0.08	–	–
Euro 3	January 2000	January 2001	0.64	–	–	0.50	0.56	0.05	–	–
Euro 4	January 2005	January 2006	0.50	–	–	0.25	0.30	0.025	–	–
Euro 5a	September 2009	January 2011	0.500	–	–	0.180	0.230	0.005	–	–
Euro 5b	September 2011	January 2013	0.500	–	–	0.180	0.230	0.0045	6×10^{11}	–
Euro 6b	September 2014	September 2015	0.500	–	–	0.080	0.170	0.0045	6×10^{11}	–
Euro 6c	–	September 2018	0.500	–	–	0.080	0.170	0.0045	6×10^{11}	–
Euro 6d-Temp	September 2017	September 2019	0.500	–	–	0.080	0.170	0.0045	6×10^{11}	–
Euro 6d	January 2020	January 2021	0.500	–	–	0.080	0.170	0.0045	6×10^{11}	–
Euro 6e	September 2023	September 2024	0.500	–	–	0.080	0.170	0.0045	6×10^{11}	–
Euro 7	November 2026	November 2027	0.500	–	–	0.080	0.170	0.0045	6×10^{11}	0.007
Petrol
Euro 1	October 1993	October 1994	2.72	–	–	–	0.97	–	–	–
Euro 2	January 1997	October 1997	2.2	–	–	–	0.5	–	–	–
Euro 3	January 2000	January 2001	2.3	0.20	–	0.15	–	–	–	–
Euro 4	January 2005	January 2006	1.0	0.10	–	0.08	–	–	–	–
Euro 5a	September 2009	January 2011	1.000	0.100	0.068	0.060	–	0.005 (Note: Applies only to vehicles with direct injection engines)	–	–
Euro 5b	September 2011	January 2013	1.000	0.100	0.068	0.060	–	0.0045	–	–
Euro 6b	September 2014	September 2015	1.000	0.100	0.068	0.060	–	0.0045	6×10^{11}	–
Euro 6c	–	September 2018	1.000	0.100	0.068	0.060	–	0.0045	6×10^{11}	–
Euro 6d-Temp	September 2017	September 2019	1.000	0.100	0.068	0.060	–	0.0045	6×10^{11}	–
Euro 6d	January 2020	January 2021	1.000	0.100	0.068	0.060	–	0.0045	6×10^{11}	–
Euro 6e	September 2023	September 2024	1.000	0.100	0.068	0.060	–	0.0045	6×10^{11}	–
Euro 7	November 2026	November 2027	1.000	0.100	0.068	0.060	–	0.0045	6×10^{11}	0.007
Electric
Euro 7	November 2026	November 2027	–	–	–	–	–	–	–	0.003

European emission standards for light commercial vehicles 1,305–1,760 kg reference mass (Category N_{1} Class II), g/km
Tier	Date (type approval)	Date (first registration)	CO	THC	NMHC	NO_{x}	HC+NO_{x}	PM	PN [#/km]
Diesel
Euro 1	October 1993	October 1994	5.17	–	–	–	1.4	0.19	–
Euro 2	January 1998	October 1998	1.25	–	–	–	1.0	0.12	–
Euro 3	January 2001	January 2002	0.80	–	–	0.65	0.72	0.07	–
Euro 4	January 2006	January 2007	0.63	–	–	0.33	0.39	0.04	–
Euro 5a	September 2010	January 2012	0.630	–	–	0.235	0.295	0.005	–
Euro 5b	September 2011	January 2013	0.630	–	–	0.235	0.295	0.0045	6×10^{11}
Euro 6b	September 2015	September 2016	0.630	–	–	0.105	0.195	0.0045	6×10^{11}
Euro 6c	–	September 2019	0.630	–	–	0.105	0.195	0.0045	6×10^{11}
Euro 6d-Temp	September 2018	September 2020	0.630	–	–	0.105	0.195	0.0045	6×10^{11}
Euro 6d	January 2021	January 2022	0.630	–	–	0.105	0.195	0.0045	6×10^{11}
Euro 6e	September 2023	September 2024	0.630	–	–	0.105	0.195	0.0045	6×10^{11}
Petrol
Euro 1	October 1993	October 1994	5.17	–	–	–	1.4	–	–
Euro 2	January 1998	October 1998	4.0	–	–	–	0.6	–	–
Euro 3	January 2001	January 2002	4.17	0.25	–	0.18	–	–	–
Euro 4	January 2006	January 2007	1.81	0.130	–	0.10	–	–	–
Euro 5a	September 2010	January 2012	1.810	0.130	0.090	0.075	–	0.005 (Note: Applies only to vehicles with direct injection engines)	–
Euro 5b	September 2011	January 2013	1.810	0.130	0.090	0.075	–	0.0045	–
Euro 6b	September 2015	September 2016	1.810	0.130	0.090	0.075	–	0.0045	6×10^{11}
Euro 6c	–	September 2019	1.810	0.130	0.090	0.075	–	0.0045	6×10^{11}
Euro 6d-Temp	September 2018	September 2020	1.810	0.130	0.090	0.075	–	0.0045	6×10^{11}
Euro 6d	January 2021	January 2022	1.810	0.130	0.090	0.075	–	0.0045	6×10^{11}
Euro 6e	September 2023	September 2024	1.810	0.130	0.090	0.075	–	0.0045	6×10^{11}

European emission standards for light commercial vehicles > 1,760 kg reference mass max 3,500 kg. (Category N_{1} Class III & N_{2}), g/km
Tier	Date (type approval)	Date (first registration)	CO	THC	NMHC	NO_{x}	HC+NO_{x}	PM	PN [#/km]
Diesel
Euro 1	October 1993	October 1994	6.9	–	–	–	1.7	0.25	–
Euro 2	January 1998	October 1999	1.5	–	–	–	1.2	0.17	–
Euro 3	January 2001	January 2002	0.95	–	–	0.78	0.86	0.10	–
Euro 4	January 2006	January 2007	0.74	–	–	0.39	0.46	0.06	–
Euro 5a	September 2010	January 2012	0.740	–	–	0.280	0.350	0.005	–
Euro 5b	September 2011	January 2013	0.740	–	–	0.280	0.350	0.0045	6×10^{11}
Euro 6b	September 2015	September 2016	0.740	–	–	0.125	0.215	0.0045	6×10^{11}
Euro 6c	–	September 2019	0.740	–	–	0.125	0.215	0.0045	6×10^{11}
Euro 6d-Temp	September 2018	September 2020	0.740	–	–	0.125	0.215	0.0045	6×10^{11}
Euro 6d	January 2021	January 2022	0.740	–	–	0.125	0.215	0.0045	6×10^{11}
Euro 6e	September 2023	September 2024	0.740	–	–	0.125	0.215	0.0045	6×10^{11}
Petrol
Euro 1	October 1993	October 1994	6.9	–	–	–	1.7	–	–
Euro 2	January 1998	October 1999	5.0	–	–	–	0.7	–	–
Euro 3	January 2001	January 2002	5.22	0.29	–	0.21	–	–	–
Euro 4	January 2006	January 2007	2.27	0.16	–	0.11	–	–	–
Euro 5a	September 2010	January 2012	2.270	0.160	0.108	0.082	–	0.005 (Note: Applies only to vehicles with direct injection engines)	–
Euro 5b	September 2011	January 2013	2.270	0.160	0.108	0.082	–	0.0045	–
Euro 6b	September 2015	September 2016	2.270	0.160	0.108	0.082	–	0.0045	6×10^{11}
Euro 6c	–	September 2019	2.270	0.160	0.108	0.082	–	0.0045	6×10^{11}
Euro 6d-Temp	September 2018	September 2020	2.270	0.160	0.108	0.082	–	0.0045	6×10^{11}
Euro 6d	January 2021	January 2021	2.270	0.160	0.108	0.082	–	0.0045	6×10^{11}
Euro 6e	September 2023	September 2024	2.270	0.160	0.108	0.082	–	0.0045	6×10^{11}

=== Emission standards for trucks and buses ===
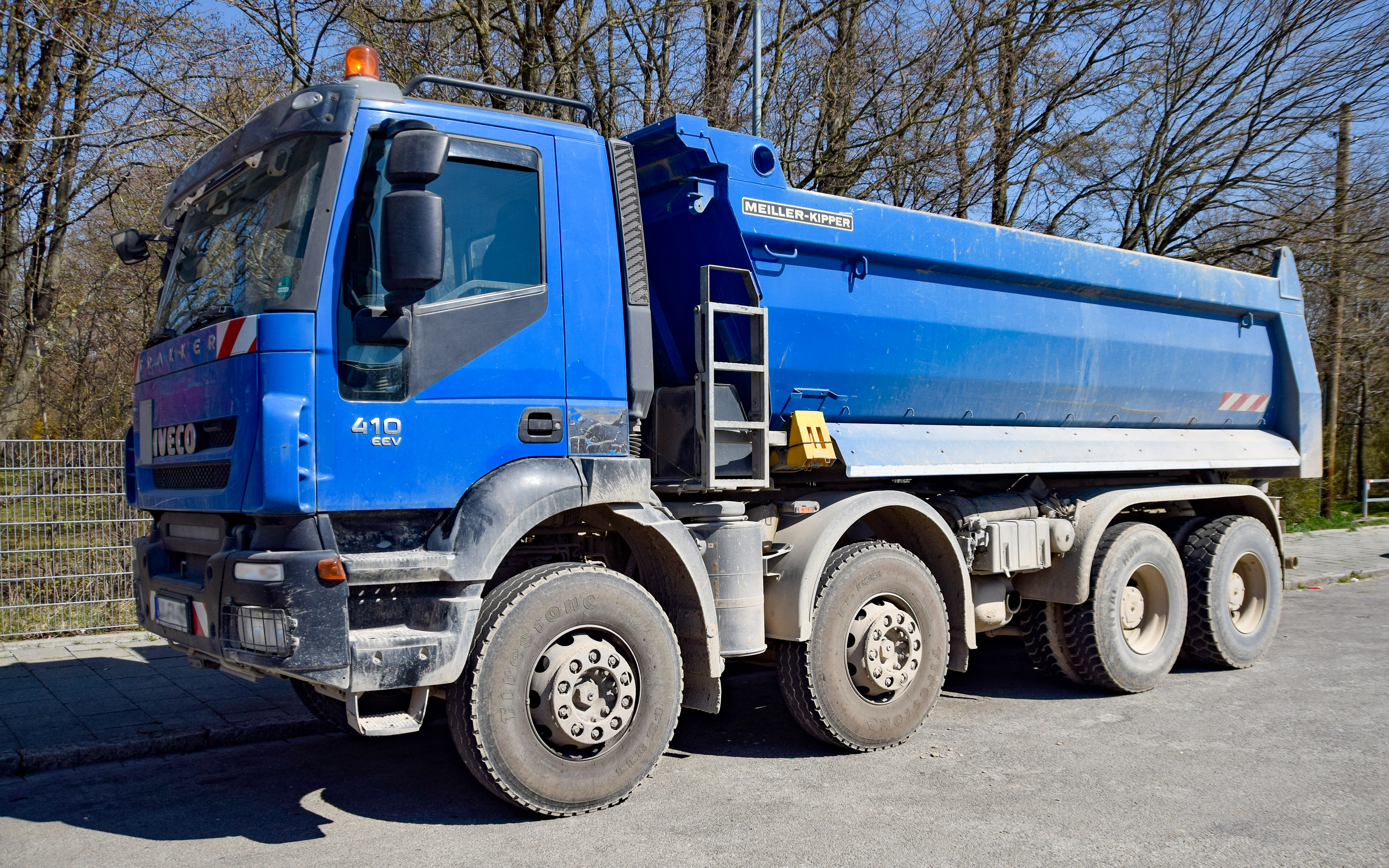
An Iveco Trakker equipped with an engine with EEV-standard

The emission standards for trucks (lorries) and buses are defined by engine energy output in g/kWh; this is unlike the emission standards for passenger cars and light commercial vehicles, which are defined by vehicle driving distance in g/km — a general comparison to passenger cars is therefore not possible, as the kWh/km factor depends, among others, on the specific vehicle.

The official category name is heavy-duty diesel engines, which generally includes lorries and buses.

The following table contains a summary of the emission standards and their implementation dates. Dates in the tables refer to new type approvals; the dates for all new registrations are in most cases one year later.

European emission standards for heavy-duty diesel engines, g/kWh
Tier	Date	Test cycle	CO	HC (Note: In EURO VI, HC has been replaced by the measurement of "THC" – Total HydroCarbons. HC and THC are not necessarily completely comparable values.)	NO_{x}	NH_{3} (Note: EURO VI limits NH_{3} measured in ppm pr. kWh, whereas EURO VII limits NH_{3} measured in mg pr. kWh. The EURO VII limit values for NH_{3} listed in this table have been recalculated from mg to g. A limited 2023 study has shown that certain EURO VI, Step D buses are able to meet the EURO VII NH_{3} limits.)	PM	PN (Note: In Euro VII, "PN" includes smaller particles sizes. The cut off value is lowered from PN23 to PN10. This means that PN in EURO VII includes particulates down to 10 nm as opposed to only down to 23 nm in Euro VI.) [#/kWh]	N_{2}O	CH_{4}	HCHO	Smoke [m^{−1}]	Brake PM_{10} (Note: Brake particle emissions (PM_{10}). Only regulated for M1, N1 vehicles and only as PM – not PN. After 2035 HDV will still not be subject to brake particle emissions regulation.)
Euro I	1992, < 85 kW	ECE R49	4.5	1.1	8.0		0.612						
Euro I	1992, > 85 kW	ECE R49	4.5	1.1	8.0		0.36						
Euro II	October 1995	ECE R49	4.0	1.1	7.0		0.25						
Euro II	October 1997	ECE R49	4.0	1.1	7.0		0.15						
Euro III	October 1999 EEVs (Note: enhanced environmentally friendly vehicle) only	ESC & ELR	1.5	0.25	2.0		0.02					0.15	
Euro III	October 2000	ESC & ELR	2.1	0.66	5.0		0.10; 0.13 (Note: for engines of less than 0.75 litres swept volume per cylinder and a rated power speed of more than 3,000 per minute.)					0.8	
Euro IV	October 2005	ESC & ELR	1.5	0.46	3.5		0.02					0.5	
Euro V	October 2008	ESC & ELR	1.5	0.46	2.0		0.02					0.5	
Euro VI	31 December 2012	WHSC	1.5	0.13	0.4	10 (ppm)	0.01	8×10^{11}					
Euro VI	31 December 2012	WHTC	4.0	0.16	0.46	10 (ppm)	0.01	6×10^{11}					

=== Emission standards for large goods vehicles ===
Euro norm emissions for category N_{3}, EDC, (2000 and up), g/kWh
Standard	Date	CO	NO_{x}	HC	PM
Euro 0	1988–92	12.3	15.8	2.6	NA
Euro I	1992–95	4.9	9.0	1.23	0.40
Euro II	1995–99	4.0	7.0	1.1	0.15
Euro III	1999–2005	2.1	5.0	0.66	0.1
Euro IV	2005–08	1.5	3.5	0.46	0.02
Euro V	2008–12	1.5	2.0	0.46	0.02
Euro VI	2012–19	1.0	1.2	0.36	0.01

Euro norm emissions for (older) ECE R49 cycle, g/kWh
Standard	Date	CO	NO_{x}	HC	PM
Euro 0	1988–92	11.2	14.4	2.4	NA
Euro I	1992–95	4.5	8.0	1.1	0.36
Euro II	1995–99	4.0	7.0	1.1	0.15

=== Emission standards for non-road mobile machinery ===
The term non-road mobile machinery (NRMM) is a term used in the European emission standards to control emissions of engines that are not used primarily on public roadways. This definition includes off-road vehicles as well as railway vehicles.

European standards for non-road diesel engines harmonise with the US EPA standards, and comprise gradually stringent tiers known as Stage I–V standards. The Stage I/II was part of the 1997 directive (Directive 97/68/EC). It was implemented in two stages, with Stage I implemented in 1999 and Stage II implemented between 2001 and 2004. In 2004, the European Parliament adopted Stage III/IV standards. The Stage III standards were further divided into Stage III A and III B, and were phased in between 2006 and 2013. Stage IV standards are enforced from 2014. Stage V standards are phased in from 2018 with full enforcement from 2021.

As of 1 January 2015, EU Member States have to ensure that ships in the Baltic, the North Sea and the English Channel are using fuels with a sulphur content of no more than 0.10%. Higher sulphur contents are still possible, but only if the appropriate exhaust cleaning systems are in place.

== Emission test cycle ==
Just as important as the regulations are the tests needed to ensure adherence to regulations. These are laid out in standardised emission test cycles used to measure emissions performance against the regulatory thresholds applicable to the tested vehicle.

=== Light duty vehicles ===
Since the Euro 3 regulations in 2000, performance has been measured using the New European Driving Cycle test (NEDC; also known as MVEG-B), with a "cold start" procedure that eliminates the use of a 40-second engine warm-up period found in the ECE+EUDC test cycle (also known as MVEG-A). Since 2017 the NEDC was replaced by the Worldwide harmonized Light vehicles Test Procedure (WLTP).

=== Heavy duty vehicles ===
The two groups of emissions standards for heavy duty vehicles each have different appropriate test requirements. Steady-state testing is used for diesel engines only, while transient testing applies to both diesel and petrol engines.

=== "Cycle beating" controversy ===
Comparison between emission standards for nitrogen oxides (NOx) of diesel cars and measured emissions

For the emission standards to deliver actual emission reductions, it is crucial to use a test cycle that reflects real-world driving conditions. It was discovered that vehicle manufacturers would optimise emissions performance only for the test cycle, whilst emissions from typical driving conditions proved to be much higher than when tested. Some manufacturers were also found to use so-called defeat devices where the engine control system would recognise that the vehicle was being tested, and would automatically switch to a mode optimised for emissions performance. The use of a defeat device is expressly forbidden in EU law.

An independent study in 2014 used portable emissions measurement systems to measure NO_{x} emissions during real world driving from fifteen Euro 6 compliant diesel passenger cars. The results showed that NO_{x} emissions were on average about seven times higher than the Euro 6 limit. However, some of the vehicles did show reduced emissions, suggesting that real world NO_{x} emission control is possible. In one particular instance, research in diesel car emissions by two German technology institutes found that very low "real" NO_{x} reductions in public health risk had been achieved despite 13 years of stricter standards (2006 report).

In 2015, the Volkswagen emissions scandal involved revelations that Volkswagen AG had deliberately falsified emission reports by programming engine management unit firmware to detect test conditions, and change emissions controls when under test. The cars thus passed the test, but in real world conditions, emitted up to forty times more NO_{x} emissions than allowed by law. An independent report in September 2015 warned that this extended to "every major car manufacturer", with BMW, and Opel named alongside Volkswagen and its sister company Audi as "the worst culprits", and that approximately 90% of diesel cars "breach emissions regulations". Overlooking the direct responsibility of the companies involved, the authors blamed the violations on a number of factors, including "unrealistic test conditions, a lack of transparency and a number of loopholes in testing protocols".

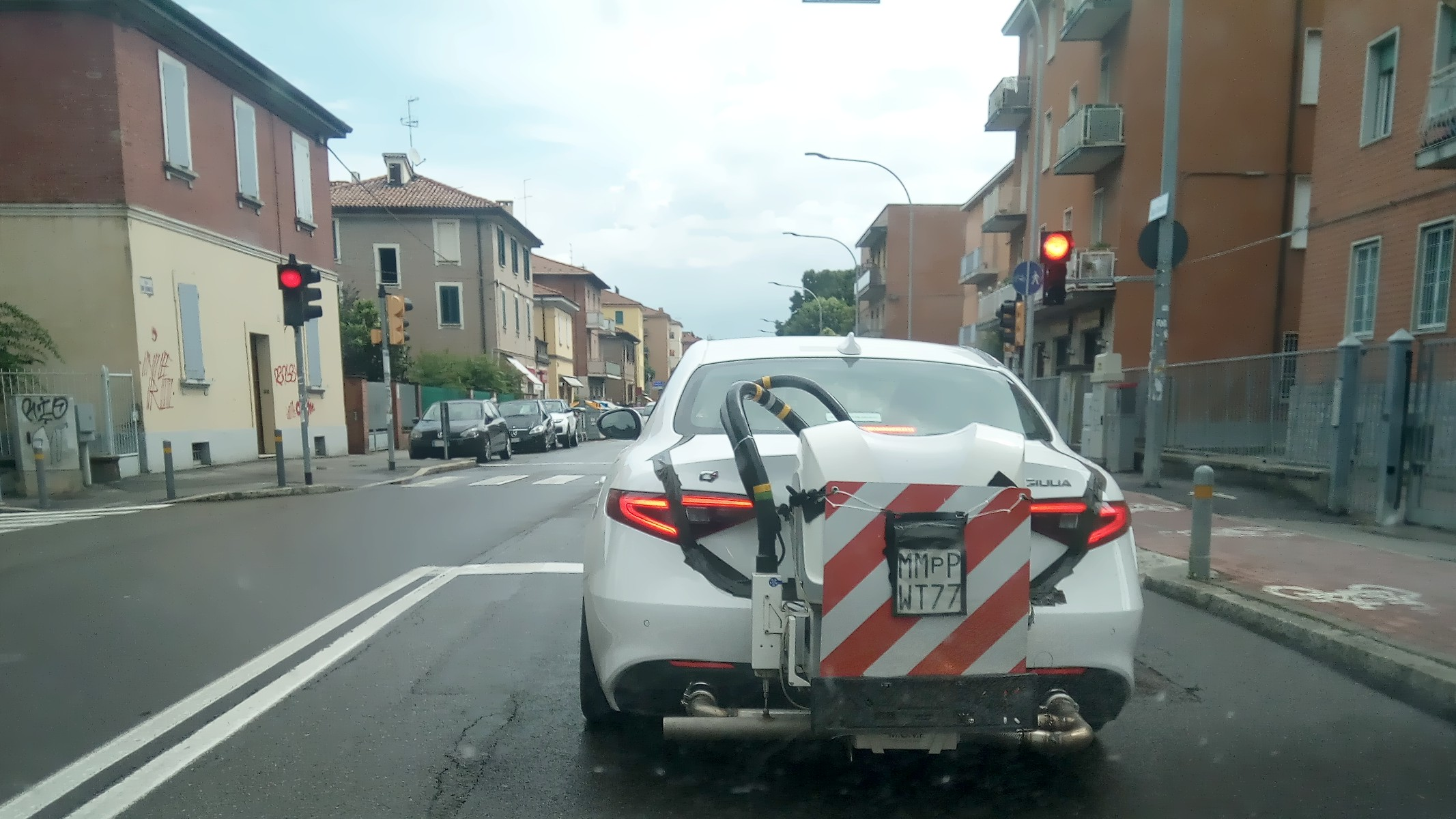
Real Driving Emissions (RDE)

In 2017, the European Union introduced testing in real-world conditions called Real Driving Emissions (RDE), using portable emissions measurement systems in addition to laboratory tests. The actual limits will use 110% (CF=2.1) "conformity factor" (the difference between the laboratory test and real-world conditions) in 2017, and 50% (CF=1.5) in 2021 for NO_{x}, conformity factor for particles number P being left for further study. Environment organisations criticized the decision as insufficient, while ACEA mentions it will be extremely difficult for automobile manufacturers to reach such a limit in such short period of time. In 2015, an ADAC study (ordered by ICCT) of 32 Euro 6 cars showed that few complied with on-road emission limits, and LNT/NOx adsorber cars (with about half the market) had the highest emissions. At the end of this study, ICCT was expecting a 100% conformity factor.

NEDC Euro 6b not to exceed limit of 80 mg/km NO_{x} will then continue to apply for the WLTC Euro 6c tests performed on a dynomometer while WLTC-RDE will be performed in the middle of the traffic with a PEMS attached at the rear of the car. RDE testing is then far more difficult than the dynomometer tests. RDE not to exceed limits have then been updated to take into account different test conditions such as PEMS weight (305–533 kg in various ICCT testing), driving in the middle of the traffic, road gradient, etc.

ADAC also performed NO_{x} emission tests with a cycle representative of the real driving environment in the laboratory. Among the 69 cars tested:

- 17 cars emit less than 80 mg/km, i.e. do not emit more NO_{x} on this more demanding cycle than on the NEDC cycle.
- 22 additional cars fall below the 110% conformity factor. In total: 57% of cars have then a good chance to be compatible with WLTC-RDE.
- 30 cars fall above the 110% conformity factor and have then to be improved to satisfy the WLTC-RDE test.

Since 2012, ADAC performs regular pollutant emission tests on a specific cycle in the laboratory duly representing a real driving environment and gives a global notation independent from the type of engine used (petrol, diesel, natural gas, LPG, hybrid, etc.). To get the maximum 50/50 note on this cycle, the car shall emit less than the minimum limit applicable to either petrol or diesel car, that is to say 100 mg HC, 500 mg CO, 60 mg NO_{x}, 3 mg PM and 6×10^{10} PN. Unlike ambient discourse dirty diesel versus clean petrol cars, the results are much more nuanced and subtle. Some Euro 6 diesel cars perform as well as the best hybrid petrol cars; some other recent Euro 6 petrol indirect injection cars perform as the worst Euro 5 diesel cars; finally some petrol hybrid cars are at the same level as the best Euro 5 diesel cars.

Tests commissioned by Which? from the beginning of 2017 found that 47 out of 61 diesel car models exceed the Euro 6 limit for NO_{x}, although they conform to official standards.

== Health impacts ==
After the postponement in publishing the Euro 7 proposal details by the European Commission, some civil society groups (such as the European Respiratory Society and the European Public Health Alliance) said in mid-2022: "Every month that the implementation of Euro 7 is delayed due to the late publication of the proposal, 1 million more polluting cars will be placed on the EU's road and stay there for decades to come."

== CO_{2} emissions ==
Within the European Union, transport is the biggest emitter of CO_{2}, with road transport contributing about 20%.

=== Obligatory labelling ===
The purpose of Directive 1999/94/EC of the European Parliament and the Council of 13 December 1999 relating to the availability of consumer information on fuel economy and CO_{2} emissions in respect of the marketing of new passenger cars is to ensure that information relating to the fuel economy and CO_{2} emissions of new passenger cars offered for sale or lease in the Community is made available to consumers in order to enable consumers to make an informed choice.

In the United Kingdom, the initial approach was deemed ineffective. The way the information was presented was too complicated for consumers to understand. As a result, car manufacturers in the United Kingdom voluntarily agreed to put a more "consumer-friendly", colour-coded label displaying CO_{2} emissions on all new cars beginning in September 2005, with a letter from A (<100 CO_{2} g/km) to F (186+ CO_{2} g/km). The goal of the new "green label" is to give consumers clear information about the environmental performance of different vehicles.

Other EU member countries are also in the process of introducing consumer-friendly labels.

=== Obligatory vehicle CO_{2} emission limits ===
European Union Directive No 443/2009 set a mandatory average fleet CO_{2} emissions target for new cars, after a voluntary commitment made in 1998 and 1999 by the auto industry had failed to reduce emissions by 2007. The regulation applies to new passenger cars registered in the European Union and EEA member states for the first time. A carmaker who fails to comply has to pay an "excess emissions premium" for each vehicle registered according with the amount of g/km of exceeded.

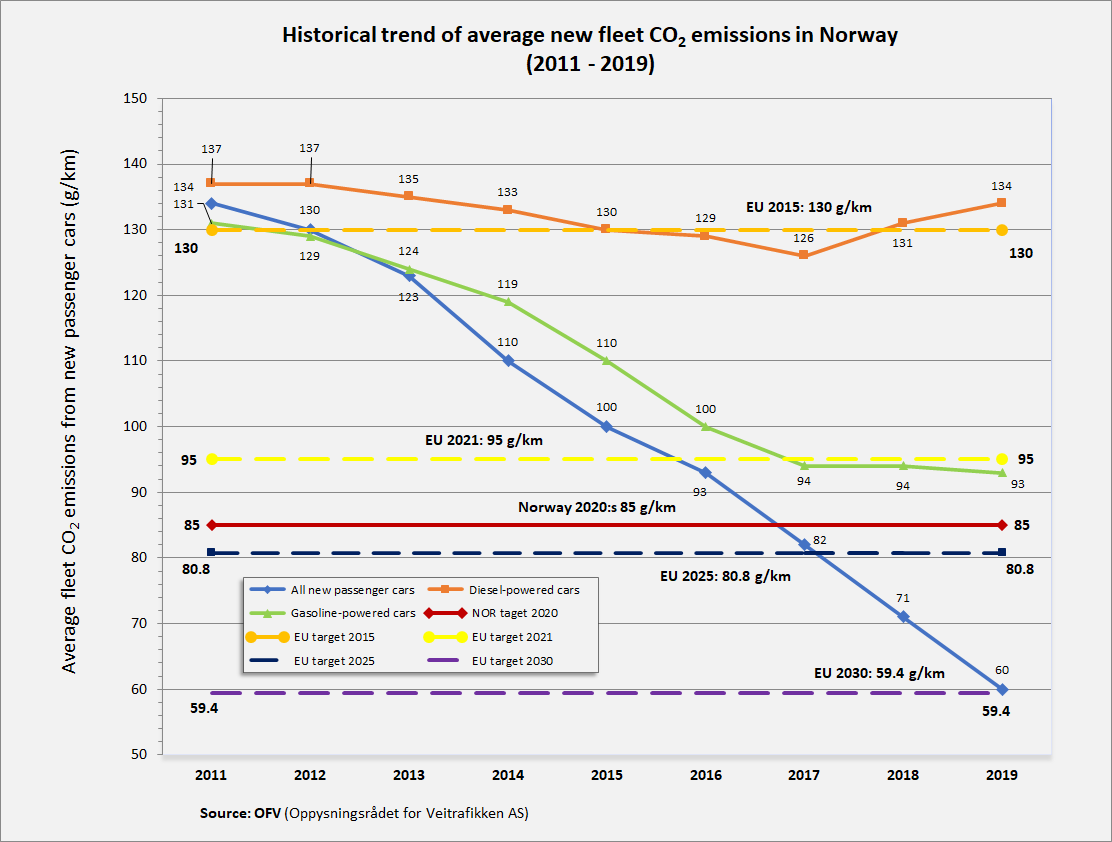
EU targets from 2015 to 2030 and historical trend of annual average new fleet CO_{2} emissions in Norway (2011–2019). Source: Norwegian Road Federation (OFV)

The 2009 regulation set a 2015 target of 130 g/km for the fleet average for new passenger cars. A similar set of regulations for light commercial vehicles was set in 2011, with an emissions target of 175 g/km for 2017. Both targets were met several years in advance. A second set of regulations, passed in 2014, set a 2021 target of average CO_{2} emissions of new cars to fall to 95 g/km by 2021, and for light-commercial vehicles to 147 g/km by 2020.

In April 2019, Regulation (EU) 2019/631 was adopted, which introduced CO_{2} emission performance standards for new passenger cars and new light commercial vehicles for 2025 and 2030. The new Regulation went into force on 1 January 2020, and has replaced and repealed Regulation (EC) 443/2009 and (EU) No 510/2011. The 2019 Regulation set new emission targets relative to a 2021 baseline, with a reduction of the average CO_{2} emissions from new cars by 15% in 2025, and by 37.5% in 2030. For light-commercial vehicles the new targets are a 15% reduction for 2025 and a 31% reduction for 2030.

Specific emissions targets for passenger cars

To account for different sizes of passenger cars, the specific emissions target for each passenger car is calculated by adjusting the general emissions target by a value proportional to the deviation of the car's mass from the average. This means that the emissions targets for heavier cars are higher than those for lighter cars. In Regulations (EC) 443/2009 and (EU) 2019/631 this relationship between the specific emissions target E and the general emissions target E_{0} is expressed as E = E_{0} + a × (M-M_{0}) with the mass of the specific vehicle denoted by M and the average vehicle mass denoted by M_{0} (approx. 1,400 kg (3,100 lb)). The Regulations determine the factor a as 0.0457 for 2012–2019 and as 0.0333 from 2020 onward.

Pooling

Two or more car manufacturers may form a pool which allows them to meet fleet targets as a group instead of having to meet them individually. The first pool was agreed among Tesla and Fiat Chrysler in 2019, reportedly costing Fiat Chrysler hundreds of millions of Euros.

ZLEV Credit System

The 2019 Regulation also introduced an incentive mechanism or credit system from 2025 onwards for zero- and low-emission vehicles (ZLEVs). A ZLEV is defined as a passenger car or a commercial van with CO_{2} emissions between 0 and 50 g/km. The regulation set ZLEV sales targets of 15% for 2025 and 35% for 2030, and manufacturers have some flexibility in how they achieve those targets. Carmakers that outperform the ZLEV sales targets will be rewarded with higher CO_{2} emission targets, but the target relaxation is capped at a maximum 5% to safeguard the integrity of the regulation.

=== Electrification ===
Many EU member states have responded to this problem by exploring the possibility of including electric vehicle-related infrastructure into their existing road traffic system, with some even having begun implementation. The UK has begun its "plugged-in-places" scheme which sees funding go to several areas across the UK to create a network of charging points for electric vehicles.

== Around the world ==
- Since 1 January 2012, all new heavy vehicles in Brazil must comply with Proconve P7 (similar to Euro 5)
- Since September 2014, all new cars in Chile must comply with Euro 5.
- Since 1 January 2015, all new light vehicles in Brazil must comply with Proconve L6 (similar to Euro 5).
- Since 1 January 2016, all new heavy vehicles in Argentina must comply with Euro 5.
- Since January 2016, all new light vehicles in Russia must comply with Euro 5.
- Since 2016, all new vehicles in Turkey must comply with Euro 6.
- Since 1 September 2017, all new petrol vehicles in Singapore must comply with Euro 6 with new diesel vehicles following suit from 1 January 2018.
- Since 1 January 2018, all new vehicles in the Philippines must comply with Euro 4.
- Since 1 January 2018, all new vehicles in China must comply with China 5 (similar to Euro 5).
- Since 1 January 2018, all new light and heavy vehicles in Argentina must comply with Euro 5.
- Since 2018, all new heavy vehicles in Russia must comply with Euro 5.
- Since 1 April 2018, Euro 4, Tier 2, and EPA 2007 are mandated in Peru.
- Since 8 October 2018, all new petrol cars in Indonesia must comply with Euro 4.
- Since 1 July 2019, all new heavy vehicles in Mexico must comply with EPA 07 and Euro 5.
- Since 1 April 2020, all new 2, 3 or 4-wheelers in India must comply with BS VI (similar to Euro 6)
- Since 1 January 2021, all new vehicles in ECOWAS must comply with Euro 4.
- Since 1 January 2021, all new vehicles in China must comply with China 6a (similar to Euro 6).
- Since 1 January 2022, all new vehicles in Cambodia must comply with Euro 4.
- Since 1 January 2022, all new cars in Vietnam must comply with Euro 5.
- Since 1 January 2022, all new light vehicles in Brazil must comply with Proconve L7 (similar to Euro 6).
- Since September 2022, all new light and medium vehicle models in Chile must comply with Euro 6b.
- Since 12 April 2022, all new diesel vehicles in Indonesia must comply with Euro 4.
- Since 1 January 2023, all new heavy vehicles in Brazil must comply with Proconve P8 (similar to Euro 6).
- Since 1 January 2023, all new vehicles in Colombia must comply with Euro 6b.
- Since 1 July 2023, all new vehicles in China must comply with China 6b (more strict than provisional so-called "Euro 7").
- Since 1 January 2024, all new vehicles in Thailand must comply with Euro 5.
- Since 1 January 2024, all new vehicles in Morocco must comply with Euro 6b.
- Since 1 October 2024, Euro 6b, Tier 3, and EPA 2010 are mandated in Peru for new vehicles.
- Since 1 January 2025, all new heavy vehicles in Mexico must comply with EPA 10 and Euro 6.
- Since 1 January 2025, the new light vehicle fleets in Brazil must comply with the first stage of Proconve L8 (automaker average).
- Since 30 September 2025, all new light and medium vehicle models in Chile must comply with Euro 6c.
- Since December 2025, all new vehicles sold in Australia must comply with Euro 6d.
- From 1 January 2027, all new vehicles in Cambodia must comply with Euro 5.

== Bans ==
=== Full-time car bans ===
- Euro 0 petrol or diesel – With exceptions, parts of: Neu-Ulm and 42 other towns of Germany.
- Euro 1 petrol or diesel – Ghent With exceptions, parts of: Antwerp, Brussels
- Euro 1 gas (Note: Gas here refers to natural gas or LPG) – 76 towns of Piedmont
- Euro 2 diesel – Parts of: Neu-Ulm
- Euro 2 petrol or diesel – 76 towns of Piedmont
- Euro 2 – Madrid (nonlocal) With exceptions, parts of: Torrejón de Ardoz and Zaragoza.
- Euro 3 diesel – Amsterdam, Arnhem, The Hague, Utrecht, Madrid (nonlocal), and parts of 42 towns of Germany. With exceptions, parts of: Grand Lyon, Aix-Marseille-Provence Metropolis, Rouen, Strasbourg, Toulouse, Torrejón de Ardoz and Zaragoza. With exceptions and free public transport, parts of: Montpellier Méditerranée Métropole
- Euro 3 petrol or diesel – With exceptions, retrofit funding, and replacement-neutral scrappage, parts of: Glasgow
- Euro 3 petrol – Since 1 October 2024, in Milan's inner ZTL (Area C), all petrol-engine passenger cars are required to be Euro 4 or a higher class.
- Euro 4 diesel – Ghent, Munich, and Stuttgart. With exceptions, parts of: Antwerp, Brussels, Madrid
- Euro 4 petrol – From 1 October 2027, in Milan's inner ZTL (Area C), all petrol-engine passenger cars are required to be Euro 5 or a higher class.
- Euro 5 diesel – Darmstadt and parts of Stuttgart With exceptions, parts of: Aalborg, Aarhus, Copenhagen, Frederiksberg, and Odense With exceptions, retrofit funding, and replacement-neutral scrappage, parts of: Glasgow
- Euro 5 petrol – From 1 October 2030, in Milan's inner ZTL (Area C), all petrol-engine passenger cars are required to be Euro 6 or a higher class.
- Euro 6 diesel -From 1 October 2028, in Milan's inner ZTL (Area C), Euro 6a, 6b and 6c diesel cars will be banned.
- Euro 6 non-gas (Note: Gas here refers to natural gas, LPG, or HICEV. It is not guaranteed that bi-fuel vehicles will be running on gas.) or non-electrified (Note: Electrified here includes mild hybrids, even if many pollute more than some banned cars. Also, a PHEV with a depleted battery is worse than a full hybrid or series hybrid version.) – With exceptions, center of: Madrid
- Since 2019, some German cities ban Euro 4 or 5 diesel cars.
- Since 1 September 2022, Euro 3 diesel cars are banned in Rouen and Toulouse (with exceptions).
- Since 1 June 2023, Euro 3 (petrol or diesel) cars and Euro 5 diesel cars are banned (with exceptions, retrofit funding, and replacement-neutral scrappage) in parts of: Glasgow.
- Since September 2023, Euro 3 diesel cars are banned in parts of Aix-Marseille-Provence Metropolis (with exceptions).
- Since 1 October 2023, Euro 5 diesel cars are banned (with exceptions) in parts of: Aalborg, Aarhus, Copenhagen, Frederiksberg, and Odense.
- Since 1 January 2024, Euro 2 cars and Euro 3 diesel cars are banned (with exceptions) in parts of: Torrejón de Ardoz and Zaragoza
- Since 1 January 2024, Euro 3 diesel cars are banned in Grand Lyon (with exceptions) and parts of Strasbourg. With exceptions and free public transport, in parts of: Montpellier Méditerranée Métropole.
- Since 1 January 2024, Euro 6 non-gas or non-electrified cars are banned (with exceptions) in the center of: Madrid
- Since 30 May 2024, Euro 3 (petrol or diesel) cars and Euro 5 diesel cars are banned (with exceptions, retrofit funding, and replacement-neutral scrappage) in parts of: Dundee.
- Since 1 June 2024, Euro 3 (petrol or diesel) cars and Euro 5 diesel cars are banned (with exceptions, retrofit funding, and replacement-neutral scrappage) in parts of: Aberdeen and Edinburgh.
- Since 1 January 2025, Euro 1 cars will be banned in Nantes.
- Since 1 January 2025, Euro 2 cars and Euro 3 diesel cars will be banned in Madrid (with exceptions).
- Since 1 January 2025, Euro 3 (petrol or diesel) cars and Euro 4 diesel cars will be banned in parts of Montpellier Méditerranée Métropole (with exceptions and free public transport) and Grand Paris.
- Since 1 April 2025, Euro 2 cars and Euro 3 diesel cars will be banned in Granada (nonlocal).
- From 1 January 2028, Euro 4 (petrol or diesel) cars and Euro 6 diesel cars will be banned in parts of: Grand Lyon.

== See also ==
- ACEA agreement (the voluntary agreement with auto manufacturers to limit CO_{2} emissions)
- AIR Index (a motor vehicle emissions ranking system)
- Air quality and EU legislation
- Biofuels Directive
- Vehicle emission standards
- EN 590
- Energy policy of the European Union
- European Common Transport Policy
- European Federation for Transport and Environment
- European Union Emission Trading Scheme
- Life cycle assessment
- Low-emission zone
- Motor vehicle emissions
- National Emission Ceiling
- Phase-out of fossil fuel vehicles
- Portable emissions measurement system
- Regulation on non-exhaust emissions
- Type approval
- Ultra-low-sulfur diesel
- United States vehicle emission standards
- World Forum for Harmonization of Vehicle Regulations (United Nations Economic Commission for Europe (UNECE))
