= AIR Index =

Standardised motor vehicle emissions ranking system

AIR Index is a British standardised motor vehicle emissions ranking system introduced in February 2019 by Allow Independent Road-testing (AIR). The objective of the system is to encourage the use of independent and meaningful motor vehicle NOx emissions tests to robustly inform consumers and policymakers of the real-world impact motor vehicles will have on urban air quality.

== Background ==
AIR, the United Kingdom-based group behind the index, is an alliance of scientists, academics and economists from public and private organisations and is a not-for-profit organisation. The alliance aims to provide independent and rigorous data that will help consumers and policymakers reduce the negative impact that motor vehicles have on urban air quality. Nick Molden, one of the co-founders of AIR, said: "The transparent publication of independent, on-road emissions testing results is the most efficient way to improve air quality." Another co-founder Massimo Fedeli said: "It gives easy to understand, at-a-glance information on actual vehicle emissions in towns and cities." The ambition for the founders of AIR is that their AIR Index scheme will have a similar impact on real-world vehicle emissions as the Euro NCAP scheme has on real-world vehicle safety.

== Vehicle testing and ranking ==
The AIR Index gives individual vehicle models an A, B, C, D or E rating, and correspondingly colour-coded as green, yellow-green, yellow, amber or red (in a similar way to the European Union energy label system used for domestic appliances). The rankings are based on the nitrogen oxide (NOx) emissions of the vehicle, independently measured in a standardised way, and on at least two independently sourced vehicles, with a portable emissions measurement system (PEMS) in real-world urban driving situations.

The rating is based on the number of milligrams per kilometre (mg/km) of NOx emitted as follows: A (green) = 0-80, B (yellow-green) = 80-168, C (yellow) = 168-270, D (amber) = 270-600 and E (red) = 600 and above.

The ratings of six Euro 6 compliant cars were published at the time the AIR Index scheme was launched.

The first six AIR Index ratings
Model	Year	Fuel	AIR Index rating
Land Rover Discovery 3.0 TD6	2018	Diesel	A
Nissan Qashqai 1.2 DiG-T	2017	Petrol	B
Mini Cooper SD	2015	Diesel	C
Dacia Duster 1.5 dCi	2018	Diesel	D
Ford Focus 1.5 TDCi	2017	Diesel	D
Renault Clio 1.5 dCi	2017	Diesel	E

== Reception ==
The leader of the West Virginia University team that discovered some of the early evidence of the Volkswagen Dieselgate scandal, Dan Carder, director of their Center for Alternative Fuels, Engines and Emissions, said: "If the AIR Index had been implemented 15 years ago, Dieselgate would likely not have happened."

== Expansion ==
In March 2019, Jaguar Land Rover (JLR) became the first European car producer to submit new cars from its marques for testing.

New JLR car ratings (Euro 6 allows up to 80 mg/km NOx emission)
Model	Year	Fuel	NOx measured (mg/km)	AIR Index rating
Jaguar E-Pace HSE 2.0I 180hp	2019	Diesel	14	A
Land Rover Range Rover Evoque TD4 2.0I 180hp	2019	Diesel	17	A
Land Rover Discovery 3.0 TD6 HSE	2018	Diesel	33	A
Land Rover Discovery Sport 2.0I 180hp	2019	Diesel	34	A

== See also ==
- European emission standards
- United States emission standards
- Worldwide harmonised light vehicles test procedure (WLTP)
