= Ztl =

ZTL may refer to:

- Honorifics for the dead in Judaism
- L class blimp
- Atlanta Air Route Traffic Control Center, abbreviated ZTL
- Zero Torsional Load, a motorcycle braking technology developed by Buell Motorcycle Company
- Zona a traffico limitato, a term used in Italy for zones in a town or city centre where access by motor vehicles is restricted.
