= Worldwide Harmonised Light Vehicles Test Procedure =

Technical standard for motor vehicles (WLTP)

The Worldwide Harmonised Light vehicles Test Procedure (WLTP) is a global driving cycle standard for determining the levels of pollutants, CO_{2} emission standards and fuel consumption of conventional internal combustion engine (ICE) and hybrid automobiles, as well as the all-electric range of plug-in electric vehicles.

The WLTP was adopted by the Inland Transport Committee of the United Nations Economic Commission for Europe (UNECE) as Addenda No. 15 to the Global Registry (Global Technical Regulations) defined by the 1998 Agreement. The standard is accepted by China, Japan, the United States and the European Union, among others. It aims to replace the previous and regional New European Driving Cycle (NEDC) as the new European vehicle homologation procedure. Its final version was released in 2015.

One of the main goals of the WLTP is to better match the laboratory estimates of fuel consumption and emissions with the measures of an on-road driving condition. Since CO_{2} targets are becoming more and more important for the economic performance of vehicle manufacturers all over the world, WLTP also aims to harmonize test procedures on an international level, and set up an equal playing field in the global market. Besides EU countries, the WLTP is also the standard fuel economy and emission test for India, South Korea and Japan. In addition, the WLTP ties in with Regulation (EC) 2009/443 to verify that a manufacturer’s new sales-weighted fleet does not emit more CO_{2} on average than the target set by the European Union, which is currently set at 95 g of CO_{2}-eq per kilometer for 2021.

== History ==
The regulation took into account various national cycles such as World-wide Heavy-Duty Certification procedure (WHDC) and World-wide Motorcycle Test Cycle (WMTC). It also took into consideration the 1958 Agreement and the 1998 Agreement, those of Japan and the United States Environmental Protection Agency (US EPA) Standard Part 1066.

=== From NEDC to WLTP standard ===
New European Driving Cycle

From 1 September 2019 all light duty vehicles that are to be registered in EU countries (and also in Switzerland, Norway, Iceland and Turkey) must comply with the WLTP standards. The WLTP replaces the old NEDC as the European homologation lab-bench procedure, which was established in the 1980s to simulate urban driving conditions for a passenger car. In 1992 the NEDC was updated to also include a non-urban path (characterized by medium to high speeds), and finally in 1997 CO_{2} emission figures were added, too. Nowadays, the NEDC cycle has become outdated since it is not representative of modern driving styles, as the distances and road varieties a mean car has to face have changed since the test's design. The structure of the NEDC is characterized by an average speed of 34 km/h, smooth accelerations, few and prolonged stops and a top speed of 120 km/h.

The new standard has been designed to be more representative of real and modern driving conditions. To pursue this goal, the WLTP is 10 minutes longer than the NEDC (30 instead of 20 minutes), its velocity profile is more dynamic, consisting of quicker accelerations followed by short brakes. Moreover, the average and the maximum velocities have been increased to 46.5 km/h and 131.3 km/h respectively. The distance covered is 23.25 km (more than double the 11 kilometers of the NEDC).

The key differences between the old NEDC and new WLTP test are that WLTP:

- has higher average and maximum speeds
- includes a wider range of driving conditions (urban, suburban, main road, highway)
- simulates a longer distance
- has higher average and maximum drive power
- looks at steeper accelerations and decelerations
- tests optional equipment separately

As the result, the performance of the car is decreased.

Car performance decrease from NEDC to WLTP
Car	NEDC autonomy	WLTP autonomy	Decrease
Renault Zoé	400 km	300 km	25%
BMW i3	300 km	245 km	18%
Hyundai Kona electric 64 kWh	546 km	482 km	12%

== Test procedure ==
The test procedure provides strict guidance regarding conditions of dynamometer tests and road load (motion resistance), gear shifting, total car weight (by including optional equipment, cargo and passengers), fuel quality, ambient temperature, and tyre selection and pressure.

Three different WLTC test cycles are applied, depending on vehicle class defined by power/weight ratio PWr in W/kg (rated engine power / kerb weight):

- Class 1 – low power vehicles with PWr ≤ 22;
- Class 2 – vehicles with 22 < PWr ≤ 34;
- Class 3 – high-power vehicles with PWr > 34;

Most common cars nowadays have power-weight ratios of 40–100 W/kg, so belong to class 3. Vans and buses can also belong to class 2.

In each class, there are several driving tests designed to represent real world vehicle operation on urban and extra-urban roads, motorways, and freeways. The duration of each part is fixed between classes, however the acceleration and speed curves are shaped differently. The sequence of tests is further restricted by maximum vehicle speed V_{max}.

To ensure comparability for all vehicles, thus guaranteeing a fair comparison between different car manufacturers, the WLTP tests are performed in the laboratory under clear and repeatable conditions. The protocol states that:

- The velocity profile that the tested vehicle must repeat (indicating one speed value for each of the 1800 seconds)
- Laboratory instrumentation parameters, such as the calibration of dynamometers, gas analyzers, anemometers, speedometers or the rolling resistance of the test bench
- Environmental conditions, such as room temperature, air density, wind
- Fuel type: gasoline, diesel, LPG, natural gas, electricity, etc.
- Fuel quality and its chemical properties
- The tolerances under which the measures are valid
- The set-up process for vehicles ahead of the test.

The last two are stricter than in the NEDC protocol, since they were previously used by car manufacturers to their advantage to keep CO_{2} values (legally) as low as possible.

The procedure does not indicate fixed gear shift point, unlike the NEDC, letting each vehicle use its optimal shift points. In fact, these points depend on vehicle unique parameters as weight, torque map, specific power and engine speed.

During the WLTP the impact of the model’s optional equipment is also considered. In this way the tests reflect better the emissions of individual cars, and not just the one with the standard equipment (as it was for the NEDC cycle). In fact, for a same car, the homologation procedure needs two measures: one for the standard equipment and the other one for the fully equipped model. This takes into account the effect on vehicle’s aerodynamics, rolling resistance and change in mass due to the additional features.

== WLTC driving cycles ==
The new WLTP procedure relies on the new driving cycles (WLTC – Worldwide harmonized Light-duty vehicles Test Cycles) to measure mean fuel consumption, CO_{2} emissions as well as emissions of pollutants by passenger cars and light commercial vehicles.

=== Class 3 ===
The WLTP is divided into 4 different sub-parts, each one with a different maximum speed:

- Low, up to 56.5 km/h
- Medium, up to 76.6 km/h
- High, up to 97.4 km/h
- Extra-high, up to 131.3 km/h.

These driving phases simulate urban, suburban, rural and highway scenarios respectively, with an equal division between urban and non-urban paths (52% and 48%).

WLTC class 3 test cycle
	Low	Medium	High	Extra high	Total
Duration, s	589	433	455	323	1800
Stop duration, s	150	49	31	8	235
Distance, m	3095	4756	7162	8254	23266
% of stops	26.5%	11.1%	6.8%	2.2%	13.4%
Maximum speed, km/h	56.5	76.6	97.4	131.3	
Average speed without stops, km/h	25.3	44.5	60.7	94.0	53.5
Average speed with stops, km/h	18.9	39.4	56.5	91.7	46.5
Minimum acceleration, m/s^{2}	-1.5	-1.5	-1.5	-1.44	
Maximum acceleration, m/s^{2}	1.611	1.611	1.666	1.055	

=== Class 2 ===
The Class 2 test cycle has three parts for low, medium, and high speed; if V_{max} < 90 km/h, the high-speed part is replaced with low-speed part.

WLTC class 2 test cycle
	Low	Medium	High	Total
Duration, s	589	433	455	1477
Stop duration, s	155	48	30	233
Distance, m	3132	4712	6820	14664
% of stops	26.3%	11.1%	6.6%	15.8%
Maximum speed, km/h	51.4	74.7	85.2	
Average speed without stops, km/h	26.0	44.1	57.8	42.4
Average speed with stops, km/h	19.1	39.2	54.0	35.7
Minimum acceleration, m/s^{2}	-1.1	-1.0	-1.1	
Maximum acceleration, m/s^{2}	0.9	1.0	0.8	

=== Class 1 ===
The Class 1 test cycle has low and medium-speed parts, performed in a sequence low–medium–low; if V_{max} < 70 km/h, the medium-speed part is replaced with low-speed part.

WLTC class 1 test cycle
	Low	Medium	Total
Duration, s	589	433	1022
Stop duration, s	155	48	203
Distance, m	3324	4767	8091
% of stops	26.3%	11.1%	19.9%
Maximum speed, km/h	49.1	64.4	
Average speed without stops, km/h	27.6	44.6	35.6
Average speed with stops, km/h	20.3	39.6	28.5
Minimum acceleration, m/s^{2}	-1.0	-0.6	
Maximum acceleration,m/s^{2}	0.8	0.6	

== Transition timeline from NEDC to WLTP ==
The period of transition from NEDC to WLTP started in 2017 and ended in September 2019. Car manufacturers were required to obtain approval under both WLTP and NEDC for any new vehicle from 1 September 2017, while WLTP superseded NEDC from September 2018. From that date, measures of fuel consumption and CO_{2} emissions obtained under WLTP are the only ones with legal validity and are to be inserted in official documentations (the Certificate of Conformity).

Since the structures of NEDC and WLTP are different, the values obtained can differ from one to the other even if the same car is being tested. As WLTP more closely reflects on-road going conditions, its laboratory measures of CO_{2} emissions are usually higher than the NEDC. A vehicle’s performance does not change from one test from the other, simply the WLTP simulates a different, more dynamic path, reflecting in a higher mean value of pollutants. This fact is important, because the CO_{2} figure is used in many countries to determine the cost of Vehicle Excise Duty for new cars. Given the discrepancies between the two procedures the UNECE suggested the policymakers should consider this asymmetry during the transition process. For example in the UK, during the period of transition from NEDC to WLTP, if the CO_{2} value was obtained under the latter, it had to be converted to a ‘NEDC equivalent’.

== Real drive emissions ==
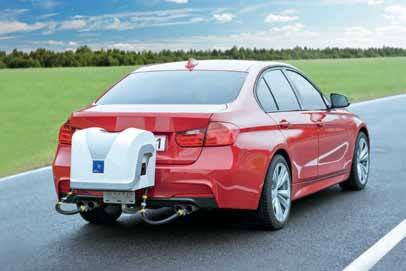
AVL PEMS - attached on a passenger car

Along with the lab-based procedure, the UNECE introduced a test in real driving conditions for NOx and other particulate emissions, which are a major cause of air pollution. This procedure is called Real Drive Emissions test (RDE) and verifies that legislative caps for pollutants are not exceeded under real use. RDE does not substitute the laboratory test (the only one that holds a legal value), but it complements it. During RDE the vehicle is tested under various driving and external conditions that include different heights, temperatures, extra payload, uphill and downhill driving, slow roads, fast roads, etc. In addition, the freestream air that the vehicle receives is not conditioned by the wind blower position, which could cause alterations in the measured emissions of laboratory tests.

To measure emissions during the on-road test, vehicles are equipped with a portable emissions measurement system (PEMS) that monitors pollutants and CO_{2} values in real time. The PEMS contains complex instrumentation that includes: advanced gas analyzers, exhaust gas flowmeters, an integrated weather station, a Global Positioning System (GPS), as well as a connection to the network. The protocol does not indicate a single PEMS as reference, but indicates the set of parameters that its equipment has to satisfy. The collected data is analyzed to verify that the external conditions under which the measures are taken satisfy the tolerances and guarantee a legal validity.

The limits on the harmful emissions are the same as the WLTP, multiplied by a conformity factor. The conformity factors consider the error of the instrumentation, that can not guarantee the same level of accuracy and repeatability of the laboratory test, as well as the influence of the PEMS itself on the vehicle that is being tested. For example, during the validation of the NO_{x} emissions, a conformity factor of 1.5 (50% over normal tolerance) is used.

== WLTP 2nd amendment ==
In the European Union, the WLTP 2nd amendment is Commission Regulation (EU) 2018/1832 of 5 November 2018.

This regulation is for light-duty vehicles, when heavy-duty vehicles are subject to Regulation (EU) 2019/1242.

Regulation (EU) 2017/1151 sets out the requirements for the device for monitoring the consumption of fuel and/or electric energy. Recorded information includes:

- Total fuel consumed (lifetime) (litres);
- Total distance travelled (lifetime) (kilometres);
- Engine fuel rate (grams/second and litres/hour);
- Vehicle fuel rate (grams/second);
- Vehicle speed (kilometres/hour).

For hybrid vehicles:

- Total fuel consumed in charge depleting operation (lifetime) (litres);
- Total fuel consumed in driver-selectable charge increasing operation (lifetime) (litres);
- Total distance travelled in charge depleting operation with engine off (lifetime) (kilometres);
- Total distance travelled in charge depleting operation with engine running (lifetime) (kilometres);
- Total distance travelled in driver-selectable charge increasing operation (lifetime) (kilometres);
- Total grid energy into the battery (lifetime) (kWh).

This information is stored by the On-Board Fuel and/or energy Consumption Monitoring device (OBFCM). OBFCM has been mandatory since 2021 on new European cars.

== Variations ==
Japan has adopted a variation of the WLTP known as the Japan-WLTP, which uses the global WLTP framework but modifies it for Japanese driving conditions. The key difference is the removal of the extra-high-speed (92 km/h) phase, reflecting the lower average traffic speeds in Japan. The Japan-WLTP also has higher adjusted emission limits for non-methane hydrocarbons and nitrogen oxides, to compensate for the lower average speeds and ensure the overall test matches global WLTP stringency.

== See also ==
- EPA Federal Test Procedure, commonly known as FTP-75
- China Light-Duty Vehicle Test Cycle
- AIR Index
