= Small engine =

Low-powered internal combustion engine

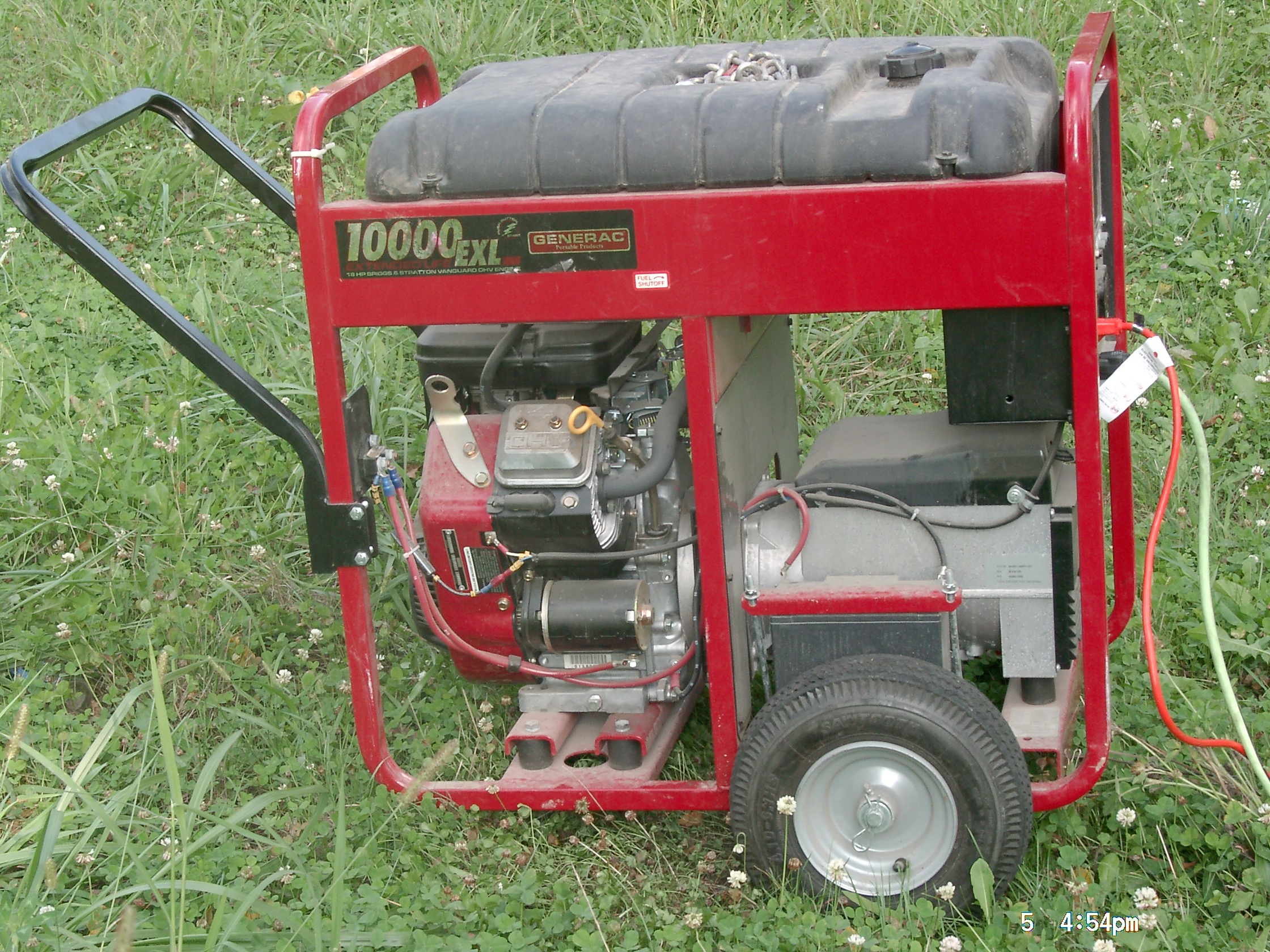
Briggs & Stratton Vanguard V-twin engine in a portable generator

A small engine is the general term for a wide range of small-displacement, low-powered internal combustion engines used to power lawn mowers, generators, concrete mixers and many other machines that require independent power sources. These engines often have simple designs, for example an air-cooled single-cylinder petrol engine with a pull-cord starter, capacitor discharge ignition and a gravity-fed carburetor.

Engines of similar design and displacement are also used in smaller vehicles such as motorcycles, motor scooters, all-terrain vehicles, and go-karts.

== Characteristics ==
The engines are small in both physical dimensions and power output, relative to larger automobile engines. Power outputs are typically less than 11 kW (15 hp). The smallest of all are used in handheld garden machinery, such as string trimmers and chainsaws, which have a displacement as small as 24 cc (1.5 cu in). Production cost is often a key consideration for small engines, resulting in relatively simple designs (compared with automotive engines, for example).

The most common configuration is a single-cylinder engines that is air-cooled. The combustion cycle can be either two-stroke (which results in a lighter engine for a given power output with a sealed crankcase that can work at any orientation) or four-stroke (which produce lower levels of exhaust gas emissions). The fuel is usually either petrol or diesel.

In terms of application, two-stroke engines are more often used in handheld equipment such as chainsaws, string trimmers, and leaf blowers. Four-stroke engines are more often used as equipment starts to get larger such as generators, lawn mowers, concrete mixers, pressure washers, snow blowers, and garden tractors.

In 1973, a small Wankel (rotary) engine manufactured by NSU was used in a lawn mower.

== Design ==
=== Electrical system ===
When a manual starter system is used (such as a recoil starter with a pull-cord), only a basic electrical system is required, since the system's only purpose is to power the spark plug. Older engines used a magneto (often embedded in the flywheel) to achieve this, while newer engines often use a capacitor discharge ignition (CDI) system with an ignition coil. These systems do not require a battery or charging system.

Before the invention of the recoil starter, a notched pulley was attached to the engine's flywheel; the operator would manually wind a rope around the pulley then jerk the rope to rotate the engine so that it would start. Following the introduction of the sprag clutch in the 1960s, the "impulse" or "wind-up" starter was popular for a brief period. These used a heavy spring which the operator placed under tension using a rotating crank handle. However, these systems were potentially dangerous as it was possible to leave the starter wound up and ready to start the engine unintentionally, even long after the crank was wound up.

Electric starting, which has become more common over time, requires a more complex electrical system. These engines also require a starter motor, a battery to power it and an alternator to keep a battery charged.

=== Fuel system ===
Petrol engines often use simple fuel systems consisting of a float-type carburetor with a fuel tank located above it (so that the fuel is delivered by gravity, avoiding the need for a fuel pump). Sometimes, the fuel tank is located below the carburetor and fuel is delivered using engine vacuum or crankcase pressure pulsations to flex a diaphragm inside of the carburetor to draw up fuel from the tank.

Diesel engines use fuel injection.

=== Governor ===
Most small engines use a governor to maintain a constant engine speed under varying loads. Some engines also have a mechanism for the user to adjust the engine speed. Rather than directly controlling the opening of the carburetor throttle, this is usually achieved by adjusting the governor, which in turn regulates the engine speed higher or lower.

=== Valvetrain ===
The most common design is an overhead valve configuration, as used by the Honda GX range since the 1980s for example.

A sidevalve configuration is used instead by some engines, owing to its simplicity for both manufacture and basic maintenance at the cost of inefficient air flow. Some engines in recent years, for example the Honda GC series, now use an overhead cam configuration.

=== Crankshaft ===
Small engines can have the crankshaft oriented either horizontally or vertically, according to the intended application. Vertical axis engines were originally developed for rotary lawnmowers, but the size of this large market has encouraged a supply of cheap engines and they are now also used for other purposes such as generators.

== Manufacturers ==
The four largest manufacturers of small engines for power equipment in 2019 were Briggs & Stratton, Honda, Kawasaki and Kohler. Other major players include: Kubota, Yamaha and Liquid Combustion Technology.

These manufacturers continue to be the four largest manufacturers in 2026.

== Repairs/maintenance ==
While often touted as a separate job by commercial education institutions, it may also be a skill someone uses as part of a larger job, such as an automotive or agricultural mechanic. Various safety precautions need to be taken when working on small engines.

Common preventative maintenance include keeping oil levels adequate, coolant levels adequate, cleaning the air filter, making sure the fuel is staying fresh, and cleaning equipment after use (especially turf equipment due grass clipping build-up). Maintenance schedules, operating procedures, and safety procedures are outlined in the owner's manual and vary by manufacturer, engine model, and type of equipment.

== Emissions ==
Small engines, because of their simple designs and lack of emission control systems used on larger engines, emit disproportionately large amounts of air pollution, particularly volatile organic compounds and carbon monoxide due to incompletely burned fuel. Scavenging is a process that happens within small engines where as exhaust fumes are emitted from the engine the pressure difference helps draw in clean air into the cylinder when the intake and exhaust valves are at an overlapping point. Higher scavenging efficiency (reducing scavenging loss) within a small engine reduces the amount of harmful emissions the exhaust expels due to less unburned fuel being expelled. It is estimated that over 10% of US carbon monoxide pollution in 2011 was from small engines.

In response to this, some jurisdictions, notably the US state of California, have imposed increasingly strict emissions regulations for small engines. In 2021, California effectively banned the sale of small engines used in garden equipment from January 1, 2024.

The major alternative to small engines is the use of electric motors powered by rechargeable batteries.

== See also ==
- Motorcycle engine
- Non-road engine
