= Limited traffic zone =

Restricted traffic area

A modern Italian limited traffic zone sign

Limited traffic zone (LTZ) is type of restricted traffic area found in many historic European city centres where non-residents and unauthorized vehicles are prohibited from driving at certain times. These areas are relatively abundant in Italy, where they are called zona a traffico limitato (ZTL), but they also exist in Spain, Portugal, France (zone à trafic limité) and Poland with different names. Around 350 Italian cities have LTZs, and 250 have low-emission zones (LEZs), usually enforced with camera surveillance. They help protect historic city centres from excessive traffic, which would otherwise make the city less attractive. They can also be aimed at limiting pollution levels or at increasing administrative revenue by paying an urban toll.

== In France ==
In October 2012, Nantes was the first French city to adopt the concept of an LTZ in the city center.

Paris implemented a limited traffic zone in November 2024. The zone à trafic limité (ZTL) will be in the first, second, third and fourth arrondissements in an area of 5.5 sq km that includes the Louvre and Tuileries Gardens, and much of Avenue de l'Opéra. No through traffic will be allowed. From 2026, there will be LTZ in all arrondissements of Paris.

== In Italy ==
In most Italian cities that have a zona a traffico limitato (ZTL), vehicles transporting people with disability are allowed when displaying the appropriate badge. As Article 47 of the Italian Traffic Code (Codice della Strada) defines bicycles as vehicles, cycling is only allowed if specified on the road sign. Unauthorized movement of vehicles in a ZTL is punishable by a fine under Article 7(14) in conjunction with the relevant city ordinance, and the fine is between 83 and 332 euros.

In 2009 the city of Florence issued an average of 1,253 traffic tickets a day, for an annual revenue of 52 millions of Euros. The fines tripled over the previous ten-year period. In the same year revenues from traffic fines in Milan were 81 million euro. About 53% of these fines come from LTZ violations.

Italian LTZs may also do double duty as mere environmental zones, prohibiting vehicles below a certain European emission standard from entering the area. Since the details about what prohibition is in force are written in supplementary panel written in Italian only and in small letters, it is easy to misinterpret the sign when travelling somewhat fast.

=== Entrance signs ===
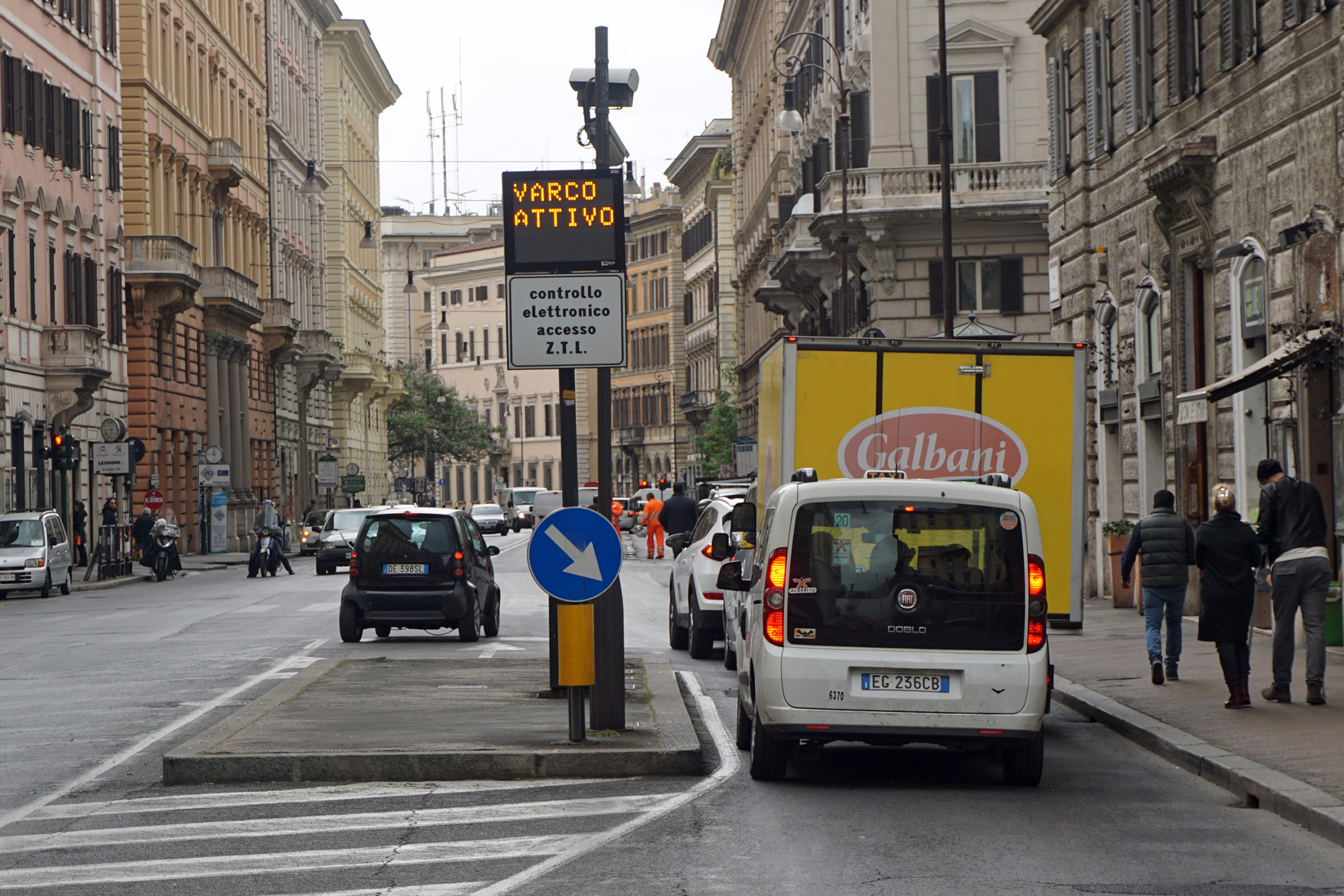
Electronic display at an entry point indicating an active ZTL in Rome, with automatic surveillance.

The sign indicating the start of the ZTL is composed of a series of panels. The first, mandatory, has a square shape and contains the "no vehicles" sign and the written zona traffico limitato. Below this signal other panels are placed are positioned according to the type of ZTL. Panels are provided to indicate the period of validity, exceptions or limitations to the prohibition, report the presence of an electronic gate or provide telephone numbers to obtain information on the ZTL.

To allow drivers to immediately understand if the ZTL is active, municipal administrations often integrate road signs with electronic displays indicating, for example, ZTL attiva (ZTL active) or ZTL non attiva (ZTL inactive). In some cases, the sign reads varco attivo/non attivo, with the word varco meaning "passage" and attivo meaning active: there have been cases where the writing varco attivo, literally "active passage", was misinterpreted as permission to go through the LTZ, whereas the actual meaning is that the LTZ restrictions are in force.

Diagram

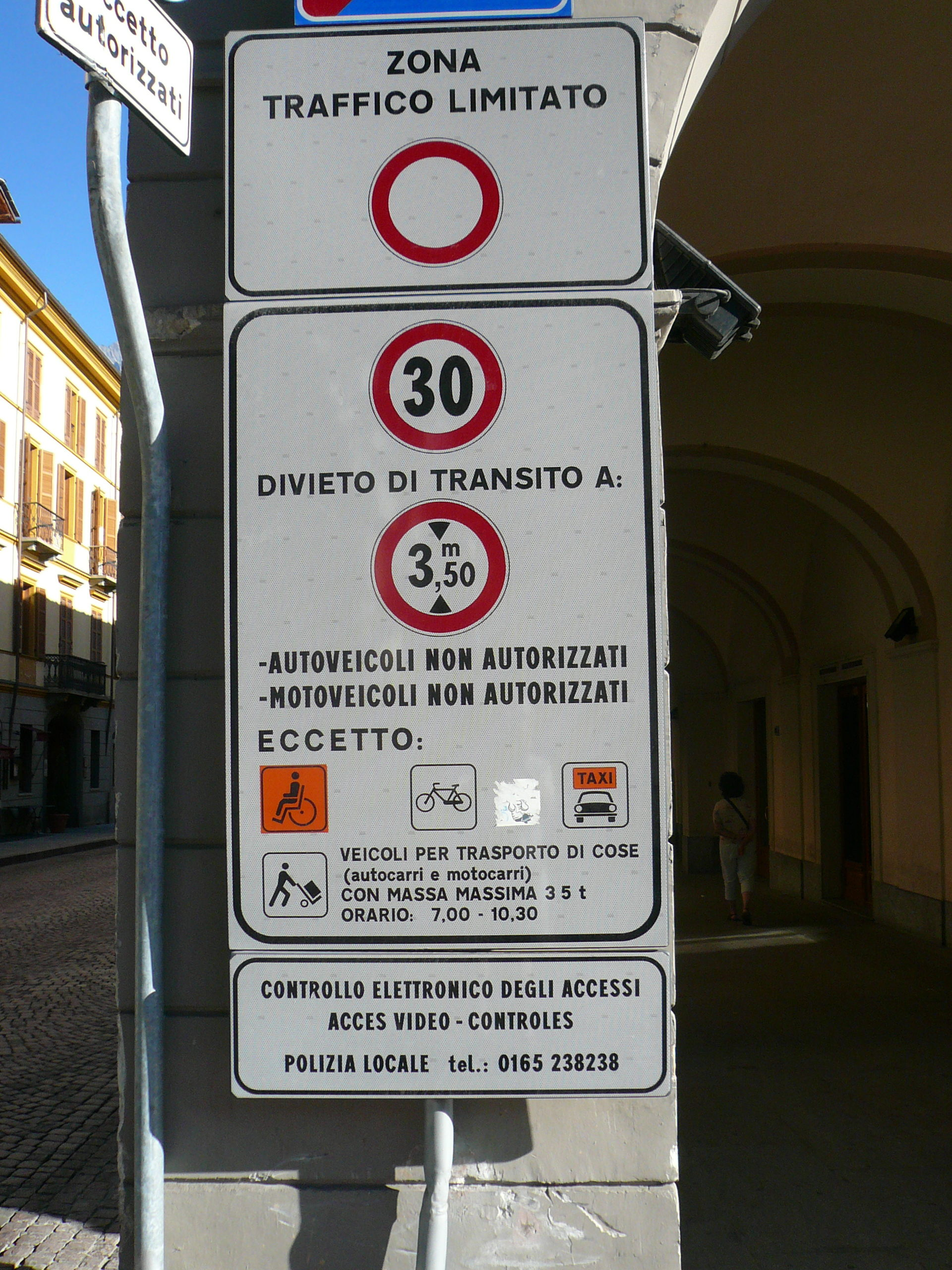
Aosta

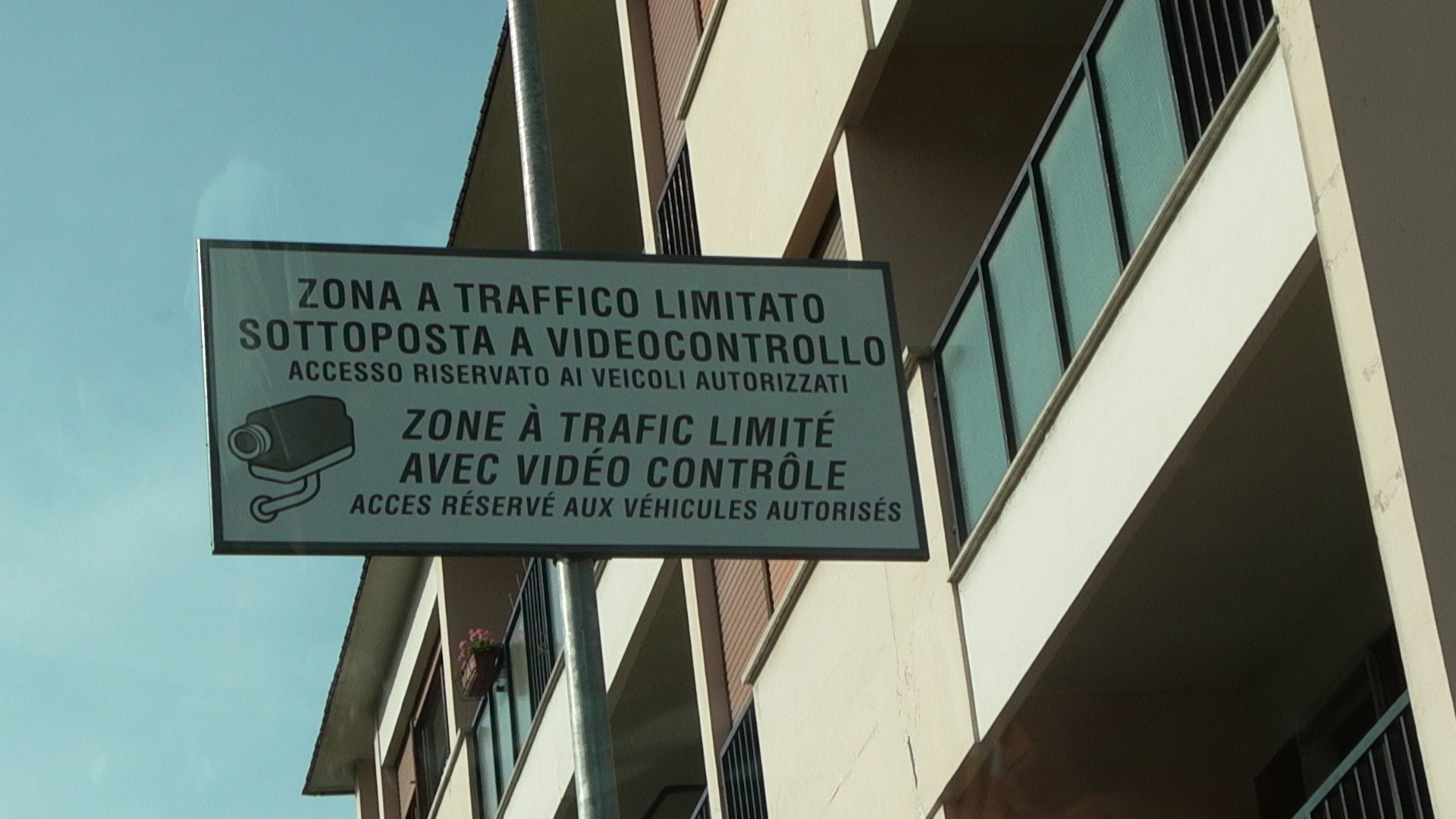
Aosta (via Vevey, bilingual)

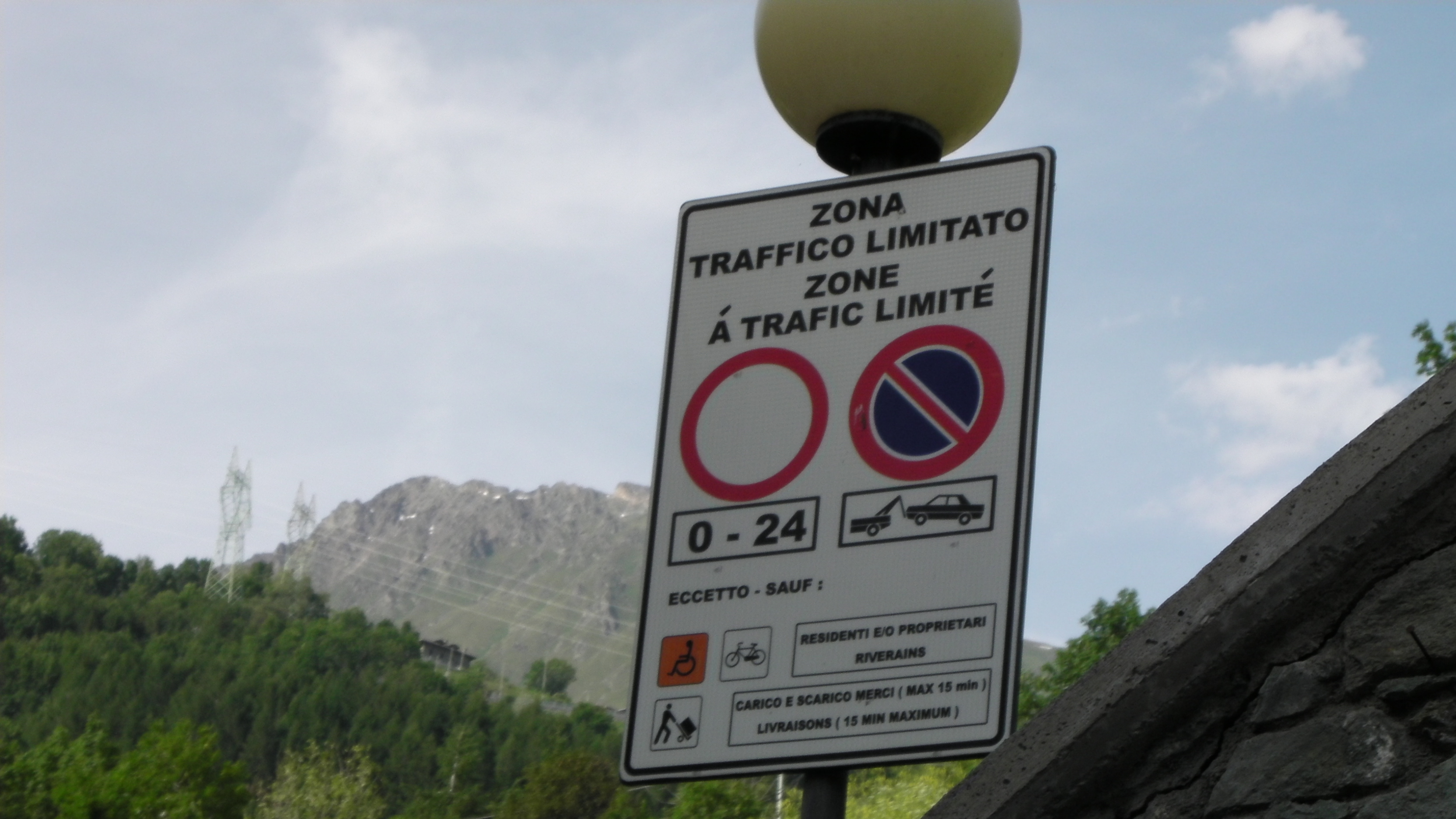
Etroubles

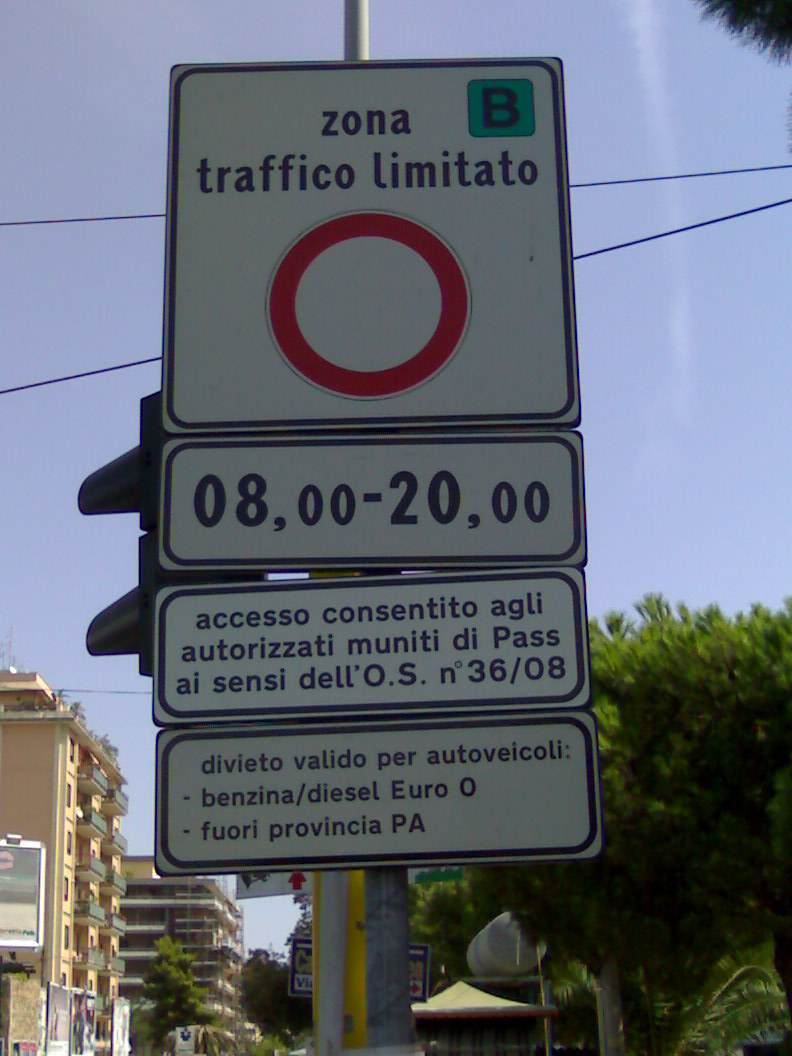
Palermo (inactive at night)

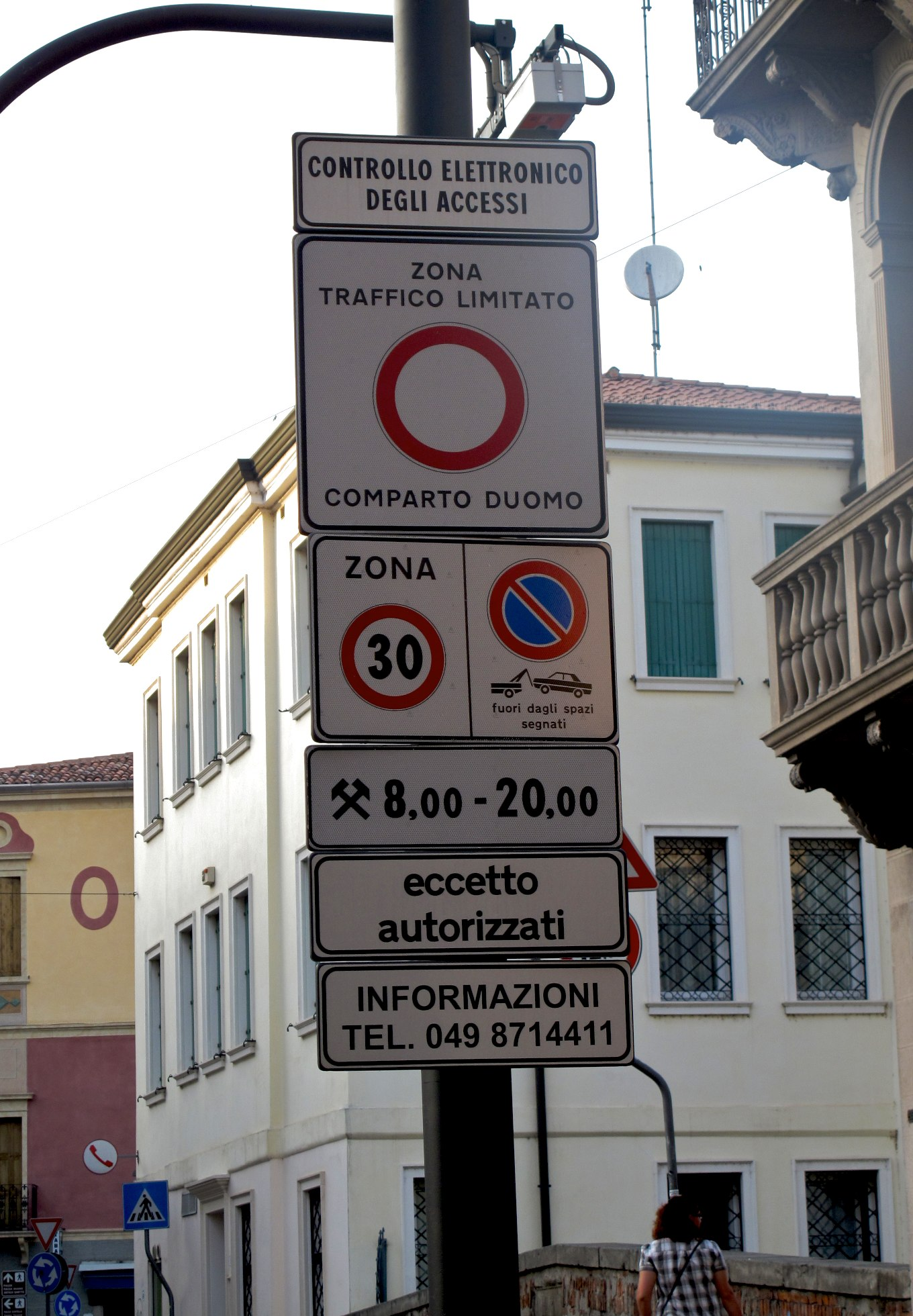
Padua (active only on workdays and inactive at night)

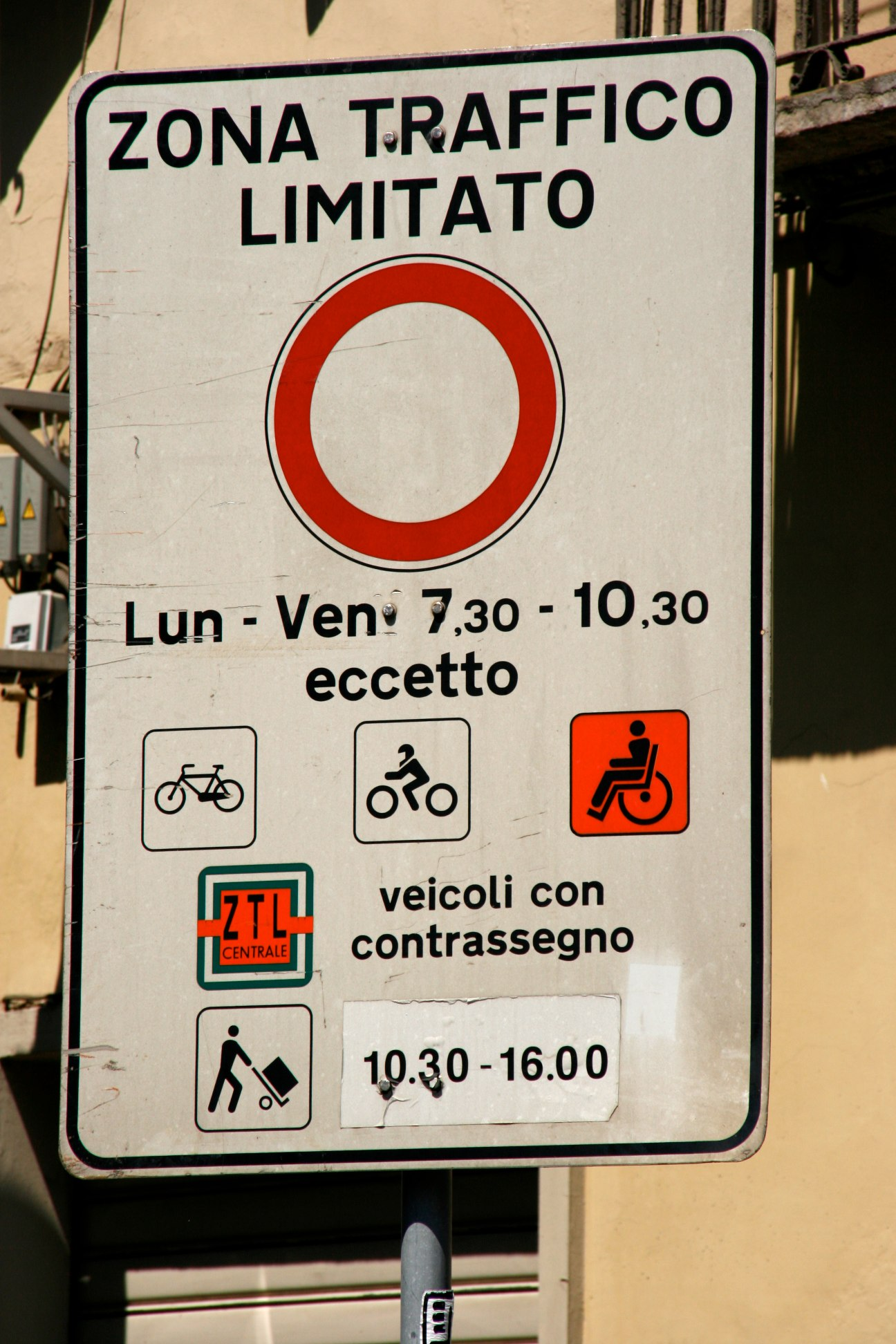
Turin (active in different periods for different vehicles)

=== Notice signs ===
The warning signs of a ZTL are not expressly provided for in the regulations implementing the Italian Traffic Code and therefore are created in analogy to the warning signs of urban intersection.

These signs must in any case contain the symbol of the ZTL, if possible integrated with all the panels present on the sign placed at the access gate. However, given that very often it is not possible to reproduce all the indications present on the main signal, the Ministry of Transport has established that the warning sign cannot contain more than two panels, to be chosen between:

- a time slot panel and a vehicle category panel
- two panels relating to two categories of vehicles (see Symbols in Italian traffic signs)

Examples of generic warning signs, without supplementary panels:

=== Controversies ===
Since foreign tourists are unaccustomed to ZTLs, and since most navigation software does not alert drivers to avoid them, infringements for entering a ZTL are a particular point of concern for this group. ZTL infringement notices often reach them by post several months after their stay in Italy, sometimes more than one year later sometimes with an administration fee added by the car rental company. Unauthorized entry into a ZTL is the most frequent fine received by drivers of rental cars, much more than speeding or parking fines. Many tourists are unaware of ZTL regulations, or misinterpret signage at entrances. The process is considered dubious by tourists and consumer associations because the signs indicating the prohibition of access to the ZTL are often not very visible and written in Italian. In addition, the price of fine is high, at around 100 euros.

== In Poland ==
In October 1988, Kraków implemented an LTZ in its city center.

== In the UK ==
In June 2022, Newcastle upon Tyne introduced School Streets with similar restrictions.

== Navigation software support ==
Most satellite navigation software does not avoid LTZs. Waze added support for LTZs in select cities in 2018.

== See also ==
- Car-free movement
- Congestion pricing
- Low Traffic Neighbourhood
- Pedestrian zone
- Road pricing
- Road space rationing
