= Portable emissions measurement system =

Automotive emissions instrument

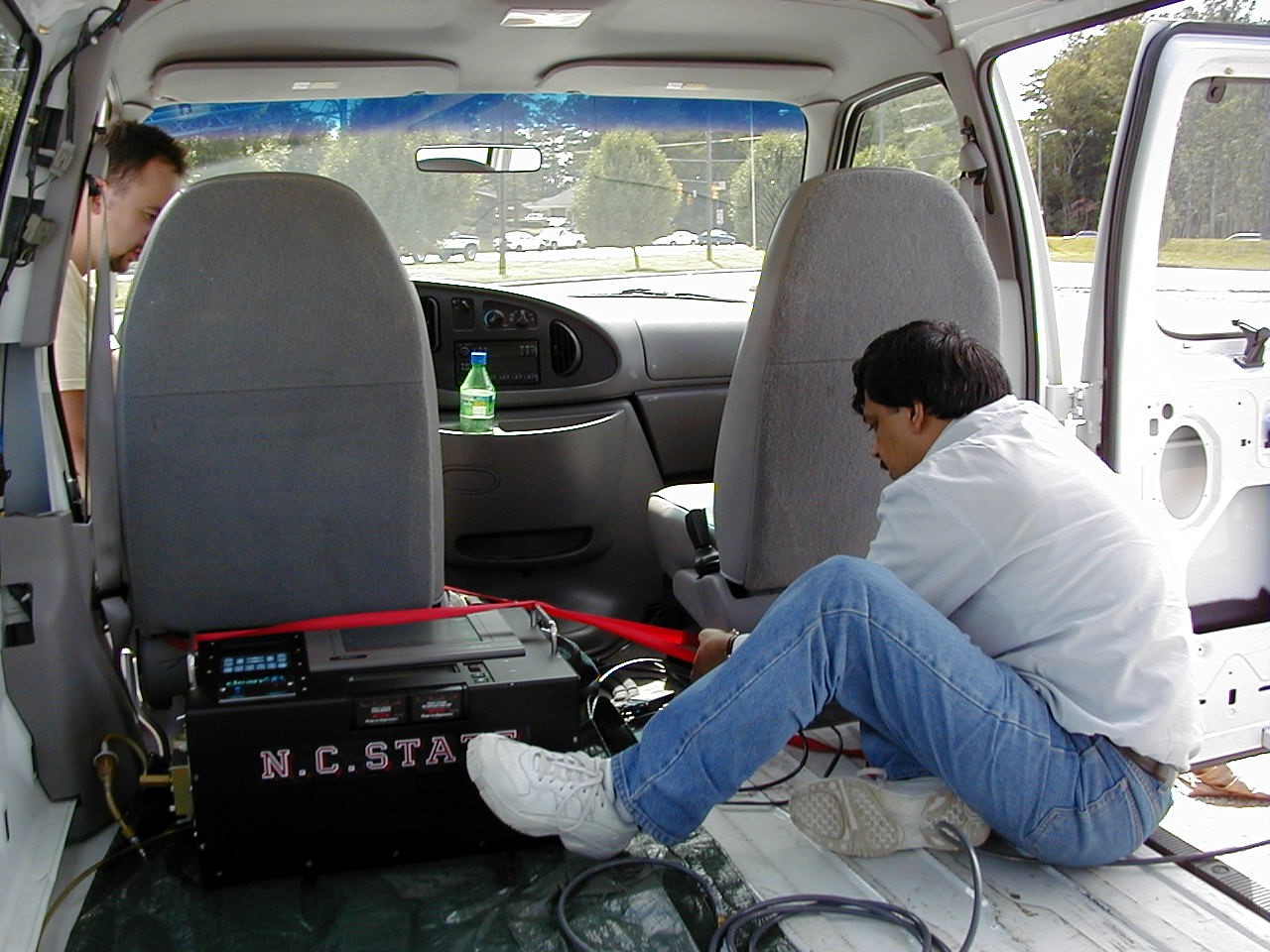
A CATI PEMS being strapped down inside a vehicle

A portable emissions measurement system (PEMS) is a vehicle emissions testing device that is small and light enough to be carried inside or moved with a motor vehicle that is being driven during testing, rather than on the stationary rollers of a dynamometer that only simulates real-world driving.

Early examples of mobile vehicle emissions equipment were developed and marketed in the early 1990s by Warren Spring Laboratory UK during the early 1990s, which was used to measure on-road emissions as part of the UK Environment Research Program. Governmental agencies like United States Environmental Protection Agency (USEPA) and various states and private entities have begun to use PEMS in order to reduce both the costs and time involved in making mobile emissions decisions.

The European Commission introduced PEMS as a mandatory requirement for light-duty vehicle type approval in 2016 by amending the regulation that was established in 2007.

== Introduction of PEMS ==
Leo Breton of the US EPA invented the Real-time On-road Vehicle Emissions Reporter (ROVER) in 1995. The first commercially available device was invented by Michal Vojtisek-Lom, and developed by David Miller of Clean Air Technologies International (CATI) Inc. in Buffalo, New York in 1999. These early field devices used engine data from either an on-board diagnostics (OBD) port, or directly from an engine sensor array. The first unit was developed for, and sold to - Dr. H. Christopher Frey of North Carolina State University (NCSU) for the first on-road testing project, which was sponsored by the North Carolina Department of Transportation. David W. Miller, who co-founded CATI, first coined the phrase "Portable Emissions Measurement System" and "PEMS" when working on a 2000

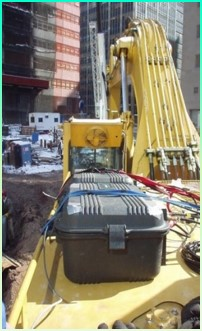
A CATI PEMS testing in the field at the World Trade Center in 2002

New York City Metropolitan Transportation Agency bus project with Dr. Thomas Lanni of the New York State Department of Environmental Conservation, as a short-hand description of the new device. Other governmental groups and universities soon followed, and quickly began to use the equipment due to its balance of accuracy, low cost, light weight, and availability. From 1999 through 2004, research groups such as Virginia Tech, Penn State, and Texas A&M Transportation Institute, Texas Southern University and others began to use PEMS in border crossing projects, roadway evaluations, traffic control methods, before-and-after scenarios, and ferries, planes, and off-road vehicles, to explore what was possible outside of a lab environment. A project performed in April 2002 by the California Air Resources Board(CARB) - using non-1065 PEMS equipment, tested 40 trucks over a period of 2½ days; of which, 22 trucks were tested on road in Tulare, California. During this time, a high-profile project performed with early PEMS equipment was the World Trade Center (WTC) Ground Zero Project in lower Manhattan, testing concrete pumpers, bulldozers, graders, and later - diesel cranes on Building #7 - 40 stories high. Other early PEMS projects such as Dr. Chris Frey's field work was used by the USEPA in the development of the MOVES Model. However, users such as regulators and vehicle manufacturers had to wait for ROVER to be commercialized to conduct actual measurements of mass emissions rather than depend on estimates of mass emissions using data the OBD port, or a direct engine measurement, in order to have a more defensible data set. This push led to a new 2005 standard known as CFR 40 Part 1065.

Many governmental entities (such as the USEPA and the United Nations Framework Convention on Climate Change or UNFCCC) have identified target mobile-source pollutants in various mobile standards as CO_{2}, NO_{x}, Particulate Matter (PM), Carbon Monoxide (CO), Hydrocarbons(HC), to ensure that emissions standards are being met. Further, these governing bodies have begun adopting in-use testing program for non-road diesel engines, as well as other types of internal combustion engines, and are requiring the use of PEMS testing. It is important to delineate the various classifications of the latest 'transferable' emissions testing equipment from-time PEMS equipment, in order to best understand the desire of portability in field-testing of emissions.

== Economic advantage of PEMS equipment ==
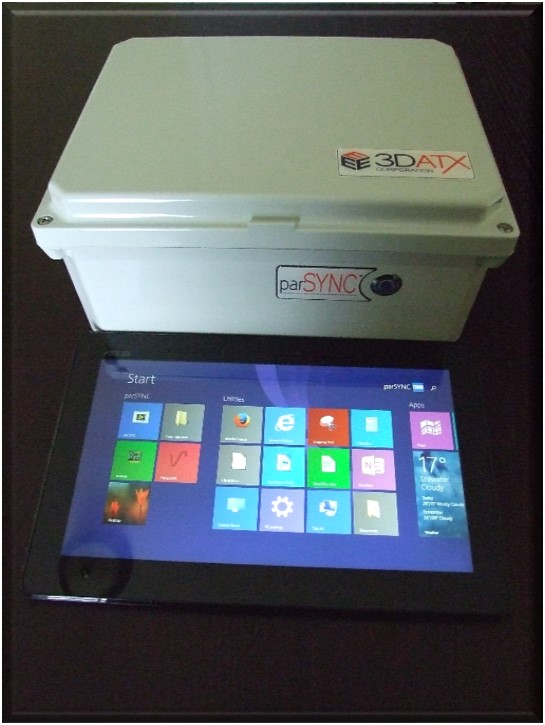
A next generation "integrated PEMS" (iPEMS) device

Because a PEMS unit is able to be carried easily by one person from jobsite to jobsite, and can be used without the requirement of 'team lifting', the required emissions testing projects are economically viable. Simply put, more testing can be done more quickly, by less workers, dramatically increasing the amount of testing done in a certain time period. This in turn, significantly reduces the 'cost per test', yet at the same time increases the overall accuracy required in a 'real-world' environment. Because the law of large numbers will create a convergence of results, it means that repeatability, predictability, and accuracy are enhanced, while simultaneously reducing the overall cost of the testing.

== On-road emissions patterns identified by PEMS ==
Nearly all modern engines, when tested new and according to the accepted testing protocols in a laboratory, produce relatively low emissions well within the set standards. As all individual engines of the same series are supposed to be identical, only one or several engines of each series get tested. The tests have shown that:

1. The bulk of the total emissions can come from relatively short high-emissions episodes
2. Emissions characteristics can be different even among otherwise identical engines
3. Emissions outside of the bounds of the laboratory test procedures are often higher than under the operating and ambient conditions comparable to those during laboratory testing
4. Emissions deteriorate significantly over the useful life of the vehicles
5. There are large variances among the deterioration rates, with the high emissions rates often attributable to various mechanical malfunctions

These findings are consistent with published literature, and with the data from a myriad of subsequent studies. They are more applicable to spark-ignition engines and considerably less to diesels, but with the regulation-driven advances in diesel engine technology (comparable to the advances in spark-ignition engines since the 1970s) it can be expected that these findings are likely to be applicable to the new generation diesel engines. Since 2000, multiple entities have used PEMS data to measured in-use, on-road emissions on hundreds of diesel engines installed in school buses, transit buses, delivery trucks, plow trucks, over-the-road trucks, pickups, vans, forklifts, excavators, generators, loaders, compressors, locomotives, passenger ferries, and other on-road, off-road and non-road applications. All the previously listed findings were demonstrated; in addition, it was noticed that extended idling of engines can have a significant impact on the emissions during subsequent operation.

Also, PEMS testing identified several engine "anomalies" where fuel-specific NOx emissions were two to three times higher than expected during some modes of operation, suggesting deliberate alterations of the engine control unit (ECU) settings. Such data set can be readily used for developing emissions inventories, as well as to evaluate various improvements in engines, fuels, exhaust after-treatment and other areas. (Data collected on "conventional" fleets then serves as "baseline" data to which various improvements are compared.) This data set can also be examined for compliance with not-to-exceed (NTE) and in-use emissions standards, which are 'US-based' emission standards that require on-road testing.

== Accuracy of PEMS ==
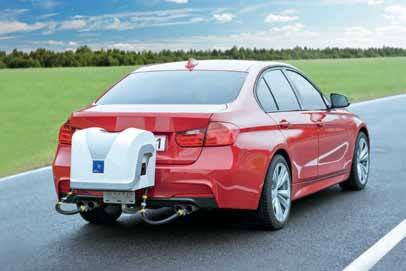
1065 PEMS manufactured by AVL - attached on a passenger car

It is often difficult for PEMS to offer the same accuracy and variety of species measured as is possible with top-of-the-line laboratory instrumentation because PEMS are typically limited in size, weight and power consumption. For this reason, objections were raised against using PEMS for compliance verification. But there is also the potential for inaccuracy in fleet emissions deduced from laboratory measurements. For this reason, European WLTP results from PEMS will be weighted with a conformity factor of 2.1 (1.5 after 2019), i.e. the emissions measured by the PEMS are allowed to be a factor 2.1 higher than the limit.

It is expected that a variety of on-board systems will be designed, ranging from bread-box sized PEMS to instrumented trailers towed behind the tested truck. The benefits of each approach need to be considered in light of other sources of errors associated with emissions monitoring, notably vehicle-to-vehicle differences, and the emissions variability within the vehicle itself.

== Additional PEMS criteria ==
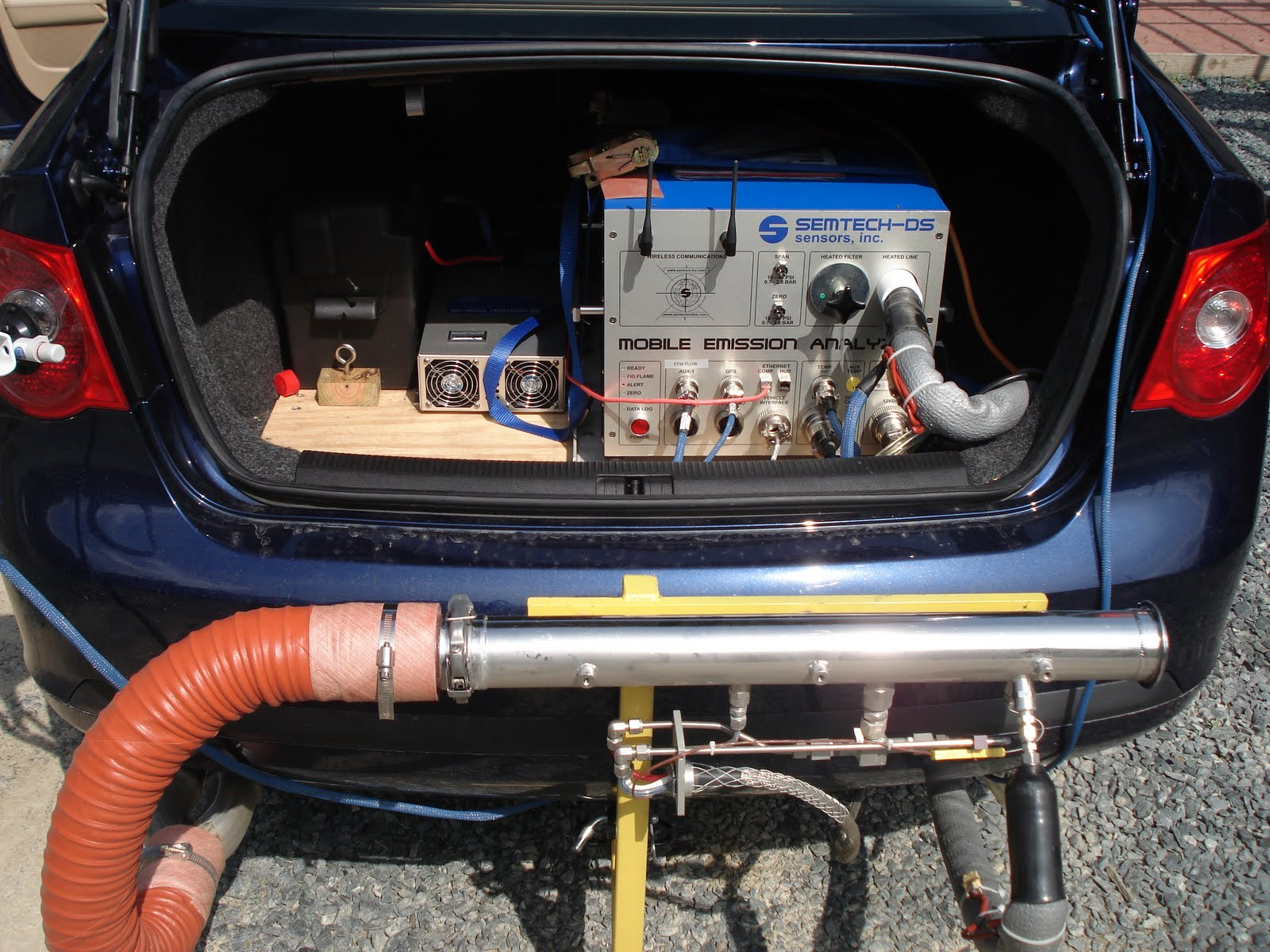
Sensors Inc. PEMS equipment

PEMS need to be safe enough to use on public roads. During testing, portable emissions systems could attach extensions of the tailpipe, add lines and cables outside the vehicle, carry lead-acid batteries in the passenger compartment, have hot components accessible to bystanders, block emergency exits, interfere with the driver, or have loose components that could be caught in moving parts. Modifications to or disassembly of the tested vehicle such as drilling into the exhaust or removing intake air system need to be examined for their acceptance by both fleet managers and drivers, especially on passenger-carrying vehicles. The test equipment can not draw excessive electrical load from the test vehicle. Instead, sealed lead-acid batteries, fuel cells and generators have been used as external power sources, though they may add other hazards during driving.

The more time and expertise installation of the equipment requires, the greater the cost of testing, limiting the number of vehicles that can be tested. More testing is also possible with equipment that is versatile enough to be used on more than one type of vehicle. The weight and size of the equipment and consumables like calibration gases might limit moving to a sufficient number locations. Any restrictions on transport of hazardous materials (i.e.Flame ionization detector (FID) fuel or calibration gases) need to be taken into the account. The ability of the test crew to repair PEMS in the field using locally available resources can also be essential.

== PEMS suitability to application ==
Ultimately, it should be demonstrated to show that a PEMS is suitable to the desired application. If the ultimate goal is to verify the compliance with in-use emissions requirements, a fleet of vehicles with known characteristics – including engines with dual-mapping and otherwise non-compliant engines – should be made available for testing. It should be then up to the PEMS manufacturers to practically demonstrate how these non-compliant vehicles can be identified using their system.

== Testing volume and safe repeatability ==
In order to achieve the required amount of 'testing volume' needed to validate real-world testing, three points must be considered:

1. System accuracy
2. Federal and/or state health and safety guidelines and/or standards
3. Economic viability based on the first two points.

Once a particular portable emissions system has been identified and pronounced as accurate, the next step is to ensure that the worker(s) are properly protected from work hazards associated with the task(s) being performed in the use of the testing equipment. For example, typical functions for a worker may be to transport the equipment to the jobsite (i.e. car, truck, train, or plane), carry the equipment to the jobsite, and lift the equipment into position.

== Advantages of PEMS ==
On-road vehicle emissions testing is very different from the laboratory testing, bringing both considerable benefits and challenges: As the testing can take place during the regular operation of the tested vehicles, a large number of vehicles can be tested within a relatively short period of time and at relatively low cost. Engines than cannot be easily tested otherwise (i.e., ferry boat propulsion engines) can be tested. True real-world emissions data can be obtained. The instruments have to be small, lightweight, withstand difficult environment, and must not pose a safety hazard. Emissions data is subject to considerable variances, as real-world conditions are often neither well defined nor repeatable, and significant variances in emissions can exist even among otherwise identical engines. On-road emissions testing therefore requires a different mindset than the traditional approach of testing in the laboratory and using models to predict real-world performance. In the absence of established methods, use of PEMS requires careful, thoughtful, broad approach. This should be considered when designing, evaluating and selecting PEMS for the desired application.

A recent example of PEMS advantages over laboratory testing is the Volkswagen (VW) Scandal of 2015. Under a small grant from the International Council on Clean Transportation (icct), Daniel K Carder of West Virginia University (WVU) uncovered on-board software "cheats" that VW had installed on some diesel passenger vehicles (Dieselgate scandal). The only way the discovery could have been made was by a non-programmed, random, on-road evaluation - utilizing a PEMS device. VW is now liable for over US$14 billion in fines. In 2016, these latest developments led to a global resurgence of interest in smaller, lighter, integrated and cost-effective "non-1065" PEMS, similar to the demonstration on MythBusters 2011 Episode 171 of "Bikes and Bazookas", in which a non-1065 PEMS was used to establish the difference between car and motorcycle pollution.

== Subcategory: integrated PEMS (iPEMS) ==
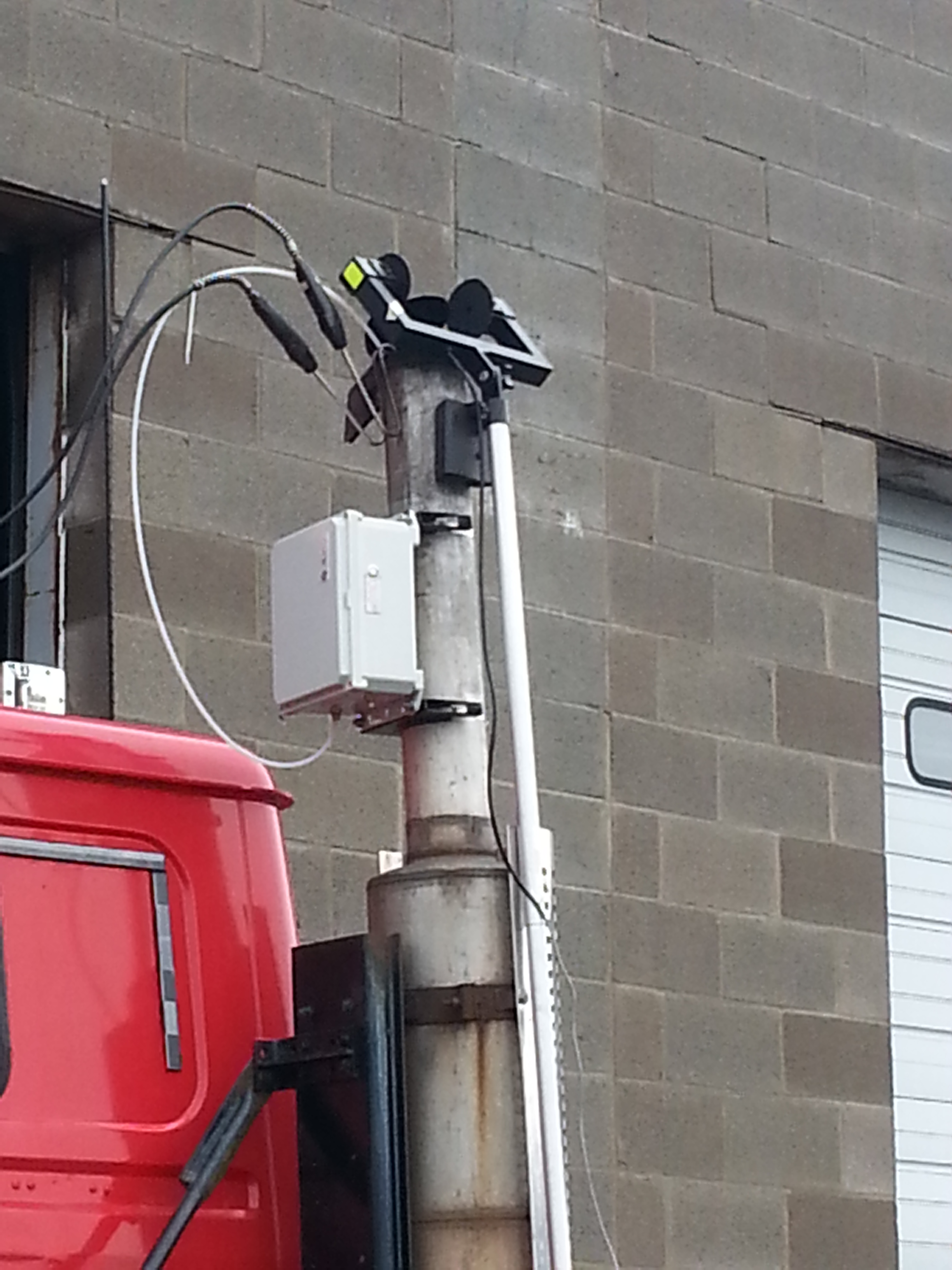
Next generation "integrated' PEMS equipment

Overview of integrated PEMS (iPEMS) development

In response to Dieselgate, the "Real Driving Emissions" (RDE) standard has been developed in the European Union (EU) which has, in turn, increased the demand for smaller, lighter, more portable, less expensive and integrated PEMS equipment kits. iPEMS equipment is not presently able to be used as a "certification" device in the U.S.

Definition of iPEMS

The following features are common to the smaller and lighter class of iPEMS equipment:

1. A complete, self-contained, and internally modular Portable Emissions Measurement System (PEMS) kit
2. including a built-in, on-board power source,
3. no more than 7 kg in total weight (including carrying case, exhaust connectors, and any additional equipment required for use),
4. able to be carried by one person,
5. which can be transported through an airport terminal and stored in the overhead bin of an airplane;
6. once deployed at a field site, the iPEMS has the ability to be testing vehicles within 30 minutes (assuming that the required onboard power pack has been charged);
7. the length of testing time capability from the integrated power pack is a minimum of two hours;
8. minimum pollutant testing capabilities must include: Nitrogen Oxides (NOx), Carbon Dioxide (CO_{2}), and either Particulate Matter (PM) or Particulate Number (PN);
9. testing accuracy must be within 10% (or better) of a 1065 PEMS.

Advantages of iPEMS over 1065 PEMS equipment

The advantage of iPEMS equipment is that they are designed to both complement 1065 PEMS in addition to providing expanded capabilities, which are being driven by the requirements for quicker decision-making compounded by the 2015 Volkswagen scandal. These devices are presently being pursued by both the European Union (EU) and China for their RDE Programs.

== See also ==
- National Ambient Air Quality Standards (US)
- Volkswagen emissions scandal
