= Non-road engine =

Internal combustion engine classification

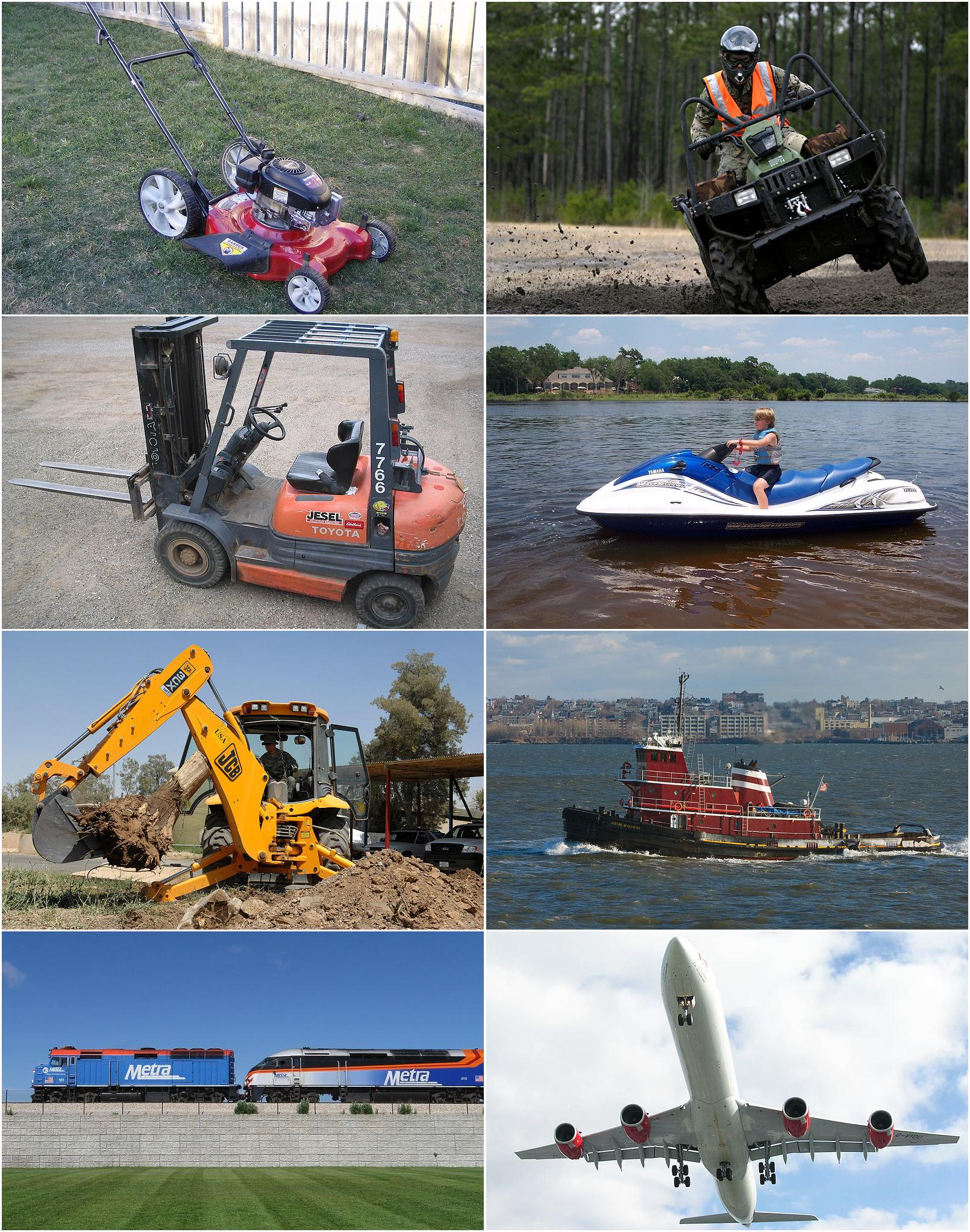
Examples of non-road engines

Non-road engines (or non-road mobile machinery in the European Union) are internal combustion engines that are used for other purposes than a motor vehicle that is used on a public roadway. The term is commonly used by regulators to classify the engines in order to control their emissions.

Non-road engines are used in a wide range of applications which may include machinery and non-road vehicles. In many jurisdictions, the term non-road engine is assumed to refer to the engines that have mobility or portability, which is separated from the term stationary engine. The definition of non-road engine may explicitly exclude certain non-road vehicles such as aircraft, locomotives, and ocean-going marine vessels.

== Classifications ==
There are many classifications of the non-road engines based on the jurisdictions. The following are common classifications:

- lawn mowers, chainsaws, string trimmers and garden equipment
- snowmobiles, dirt bikes, monster trucks and off-road vehicles
- cold chain transport vehicles
- forklifts, generators and compressors using gasoline or propane
- boats, yachts and personal watercraft
- heavy equipment and agricultural machinery such as backhoes and tractors. Other equipment are included such as ground support equipment, forklifts, generators, compressors and pumps that use diesel engines.
- marine diesel engines
- internal combustion locomotives, railcars, and diesel multiple units
- aircraft engines

In certain jurisdictions, stationary engines that are diesel powered may be classified as non-road engines.

== United States and Europe ==
The rationale for establishing emission standards for non-road engines is that they are a significant source of pollution. The engines of on-road vehicles have advanced emission controls which are not found on those non-road engines. The non-road engines also emit air pollution particles at much higher rates.

The emission standards are based on the engine classifications and vary in various jurisdictions. The main model regulations that are used by many countries are the United States Environmental Protection Agency through the section 213 of the Clean Air Act (42 U.S.C. 7547) and the directive of the European Commission (the "mother" Directive 97/68/EC, the amendments Directive 2002/88/EC, Directive 2004/26/EC, Directive 2006/105/EC, Directive 2011/88/EU and the last amendment Directive 2012/46/EU). The directives cover diesel engines, spark-ignition engines, constant-speed engines, railcars, locomotives and inland waterway vessels.

In Europe, the term "non-road mobile machinery" (NRMM) is used to clarify that the definition refers to non-road engines that are capable of self-propulsion.

In the European Union, in 2023, the Commission and the Council proposed to harmonize road safety requirements to ease non-road mobile machinery (such as lawn mowers, harvesters or bulldozers) to circulate on public roads and replace local European union member states regulations. This would only apply to machine with maximum speed greater than 6 km/hour (around 4 miles per hour). Next legislative step would be in the European parliament.

== Other countries ==
The standards for non-road diesel engines are more harmonized. Many countries adopt the emission standards derived from either the US or the European models.

Canada adopted the US standards in 1999. Korea modeled its Tier 2 standards from the US Tier 2. Russia adopted the European Stage I standards. Turkey adopted the European standards but with different implementation dates. China adopted the European Stage I/II standards in 2007.

India introduced its own standards in 2006 called Bharat (CEV) Stage II (based in part on European Stage I) and Bharat (CEV) Stage III (based on US Tier 2/3). Japan introduced its own standards that are similar but not harmonized to the US Tier 3 and Europe Stage III A. Brazil adopted the resolution in 2011 to set emission standards that are equivalent to US Tier 3 and European Stage III A.

In Australia, the definition includes some stationary engines such as electric generators and pumps.

== See also ==
- Small engine
