= DMG =

DMG may refer to:

== Organizations ==
=== Entertainment ===
- DMG Clearances, music licensor in Delaware, USA
- DMG Entertainment, a Chinese film company
- DMG Nashville, a brand of Hollywood Records
- Nova Entertainment, formerly DMG Radio, Australia
- DMG TV, a music label belonging to Demon Music Group
- Dames Making Games, Canada, encouraging women to make video games
- Davidson Media Group, an American radio station holding company
- Former Diamante Music Group, US record label distributor
- Disney Music Group
- Dungeon Masters Guide, Dungeons & Dragons game book

=== Other organizations ===
- DMG interpersonal, a club for Charities in Germany
- DMG Media, a UK newspaper and website publisher
- DMG Mori Seiki Co., a Japanese tool manufacturing company
- D.M.G. Grupo Holding S.A., a Colombian company disbanded in 2008
- Daily Mail and General Trust, an international media company
- Former Daimler Motoren Gesellschaft, now Daimler AG, German car maker
- DMG Mori Aktiengesellschaft, a German engineering company
- Deutsche Morgenländische Gesellschaft, German Oriental Society
- Pakistan Administrative Service, formerly District Management Group of the civil service

== Science and technology ==
- DMG (Dot Matrix Game), original Game Boy product code
- .dmg, file extension for Apple Disk Image files
- DMG (cancer) (diffuse midline glioma), a brain tumor
- Dimethylglycine, a chemical compound
- Direct metalation group, the target of directed ortho metalation

== Other uses ==
- DMG (rapper), US rapper
- Decoration for Merit in Gold, a South African military decoration
- DMG 90, a Holden Commodore car
- Dungeon Master's Guide, game rulebook
- ISO 639:dmg or Kinabatangan language, Malaysia
- Distinguished Military Graduate, US cadet

== See also ==
- DMG @ The Stone Volume 1, 2008, album by the Stone Quartet
- DMG-PEG 2000, a chemical compound
- DmgH, or dimethylglyoxime
- Denel DMG-5, a type of General Purpose Machine Gun
