= Joachim Milberg =

German engineer and manager (born 1943)

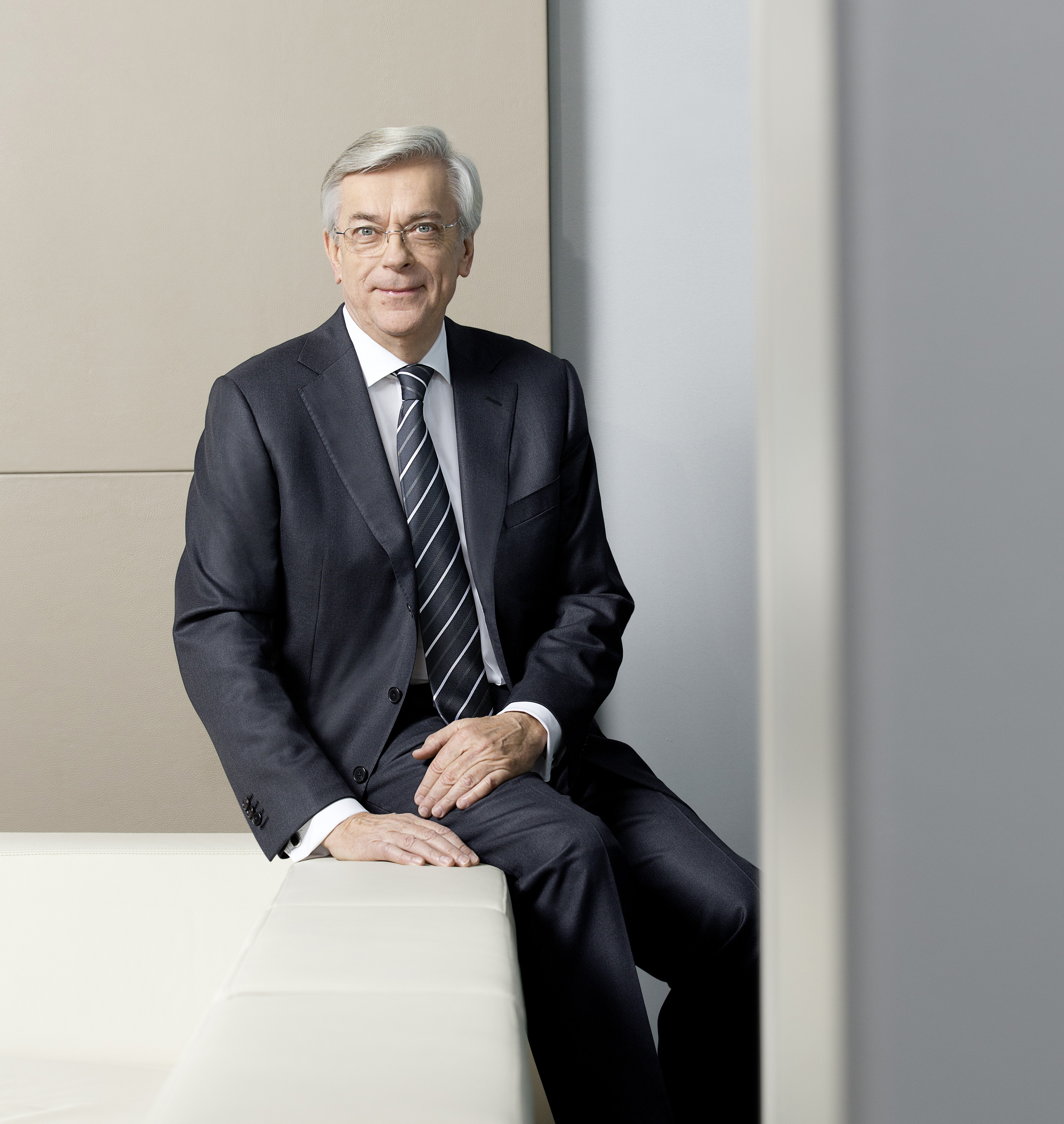
Joachim Milberg

Joachim Milberg (born 10 April 1943 in Verl (Westfalen)) is a German engineer and manager who was CEO of Bayerischen Motorenwerke AG (BMW). He was chairman of the Supervisory Board of BMW until July 2015.

Milberg was professor and Dean of the Faculty of Mechanical Engineering at the Technical University of Munich. He was Member of the Board of Management for Production of BMW and became CEO when Bernd Pischetsrieder had to leave because of the Rover problems. Milberg stopped the Rover venture.

Milberg was the founding President of acatech – the German Academy of Science and Engineering.

== Early life ==
Milberg grew up on a farm in Sennestadt, today part of the city of Bielefeld. From 1953 to 1959 Milberg went to secondary school. From 1959 to 1962 he trained as a mechanic at Gildemeister AG and, from 1962 to 1965, studied production engineering at the State Engineering School Bielefeld. He continued his studies at the Technische Universität Berlin with a scholarship of the Studienstiftung des deutschen Volkes and obtained his Dipl.-Ing. in 1969. From 1970 to 1972, he was research assistant at the Institut für Werkzeugmaschinen und Fertigungstechnik of the Technischen Universität Berlin (Günter Spur). In 1971, he was awarded his doctorate in production engineering.

== Career ==
In 1972, Milberg became senior manager at the machine tool factory Gildemeister AG. From 1978 to 1981, he was head of the Automatic Lathe Division.

In 1981, Milberg became full professor for machine tools with business administration at Technical University of Munich, head of the Center for Production Automation and Robotics in Munich and the Production Application Center in Augsburg. From 1991 to 1993, he was Dean of the Faculty of Mechanical Engineering.

In 1993, Milberg became member of the board of management of BMW, responsible for production. After having just overseen the successful launch of the BMW 3 Series, he was named by the supervisory board of BMW – then led by Eberhard von Kuenheim – as the company’s new CEO in 1999. He succeeded Bernd Pischetsrieder, who resigned along with Wolfgang Reitzle, another manager widely viewed as potential successor at the time. He was heavily criticized by the German media for BMW's decision to sell its unprofitable U.K. subsidiary Rover in 2000. In 2002, he decided to step down a year ahead of schedule and handed over to Helmut Panke, in an effort to avoid media speculation about who would succeed him in what would be the final year of his tenure at BMW. He subsequently became chairman of the supervisory board in 2004.

== Other activities ==
=== Corporate boards ===
- BMW AG, Chairman of the Supervisory Board (since 2002) since 2004 Chairman
- Festo AG & Co. KG, Chairman of the Supervisory Board (since 2011)
- Member of the shareholder's committee of ifp – Prof. Dr.-Ing. Joachim Milberg Institut für Produktion und Logistik GmbH & Co.KG, Garching b. München
- ZF Friedrichshafen AG, Member of the Supervisory Board (2008–2011)
- SAP AG, Member of the Supervisory Board (2007–2012)
- Bertelsmann AG, Member of the Supervisory Board (2005–2017)
- MAN AG, Member of the Supervisory Board (2005–2007)
- John Deere & Company, Member of the Board of Directors (2003–2017)
- Leipziger Messe, Member of the Supervisory Board (2003–2007)
- Allianz Versicherungs AG, Member of the Supervisory Board (2001–2006)
- Royal Dutch Petroleum Company/Shell, Member of the Board of Directors (2000–2003)

=== Non-profit organizations ===
- acatech – Deutsche Akademie der Technikwissenschaften, Member of the Senate Committee
- Allensbach Institute, Member of the Board of Trustees
- BMW Foundation Herbert Quandt, Chairman of the Board of Trustees
- Deutsches Museum, Member of the Board of Trustees
- Lindau Nobel Laureate Meetings, Member of the Honorary Senate

== Awards and honours ==
- 1989 Gottfried Wilhelm Leibniz Prize by the Deutschen Forschungsgemeinschaft (DFG) – the highest German research prize
- 1992 Herwart-Opitz-Commemorative Medal of the VDI-Society Production Engineering
- 1994 Verdienstkreuz am Bande (Cross) of the Order of Merit of the Federal Republic of Germany
- 1994 Honorary doctorate of the University of Ljubljana, Slovenia
- 1996 Honorary doctorate of Leibniz University Hannover
- 2000 Grashof Commemorative Medal of Verein Deutscher Ingenieure (the highest distinction of the Association of German Engineers)
- 2001 Bayerischer Verdienstorden
- 2001 General Pierre Nicolau Award der CIRP (College International pour la Recherche en Productique – The International Academy for Production Engineering)
- 2001 Ehrenpreis "Goldenes Lenkrad" des Axel Springer Verlags
- 2002 Honorary doctorate of the Cranfield University, England (UK)
- 2002 Bayerische Umweltmedaille für besondere Verdienste um Umweltschutz und Landesentwicklung
- 2004 Honorary doctorate of the Technischen Universität Berlin
- 2005 Arthur-Burkhardt-Preis
- 2005 Member of the German Academy of Sciences Leopoldina
- 2009 Hanns Martin Schleyer Prize
- 2010 Bayerischer Maximiliansorden für Wissenschaft und Kunst
- 2010 Honorarprofessor at the Universität Duisburg-Essen
- 2016 National Academy of Engineering Member

== Publications ==
- Milberg, J.: Analytische und experimentelle Untersuchungen zur Stabilitätsgrenze bei der Drehbearbeitung. Diss. Techn. Univ. Berlin 1971.
- Milberg, J. (Hrsg.): Wettbewerbsfähigkeit durch Integration. Springer Verlag. Berlin, Heidelberg New York 1988.
- Milberg, J. (Hrsg.): Wettbewerbsfaktor Zeit in Produktionsunternehmen. Springer Verlag. Berlin, Heidelberg, New York 1991.
- Milberg, J. (Hrsg.): Von CAD(CAM zu CIM. Verlag TÜV Rheinland. Köln 1992.
- VDI-Gemeinschaftsausschuss CIM (Hrsg.) Obmann: Milberg, J.: Rechnerintegrierte Konstruktion und Produktion. VDI-Verlag. Düsseldorf 1992.
  - Band 1: CIM Management
  - Band 2: Integrierte Produktdatenverarbeitung
  - Band 3: Auftragsabwicklung
  - Band 4: Flexible Fertigung
  - Band 5: Produktionslogistik
  - Band 6: Kommunikations- und Datenbanktechnik
  - Band 7: Qualitätssicherung
  - Band 8: Flexible Montage
- Milberg, J. (Hrsg.): Werkzeugmaschinen Grundlagen. Springer Verlag. Berlin, Heidelberg, New York 1992.
- Milberg, J.; Reinhart, G. (Hrsg.): Unsere Stärken stärken – Der Weg zu Wettbewerbsfähigkeit und Standortsicherung. mi Verlag. Landberg 1994.
- Milberg, J.; Reinhart, G. (Hrsg.): Mit Schwung zum Aufschwung – Information, Inspiration, Innovation. mi Verlag. Landberg 1997.
- Milberg, J.; Schuh, G. (Hrsg.): Erfolg in Netzwerken. Springer Verlag. Berlin, Heidelberg, New York 2002.
