= DMG Mori Seiki =

DMG Mori Seiki is the name of two companies:

- DMG Mori Seiki AG, a German machine tool building company
- DMG Mori Seiki Co., a Japanese machine tool building company
