= Volkswagen controversies =

Overview of criticisms and controversies involving Volkswagen

Volkswagen, the German automotive company, has been involved in several controversies.

== Environmental record ==
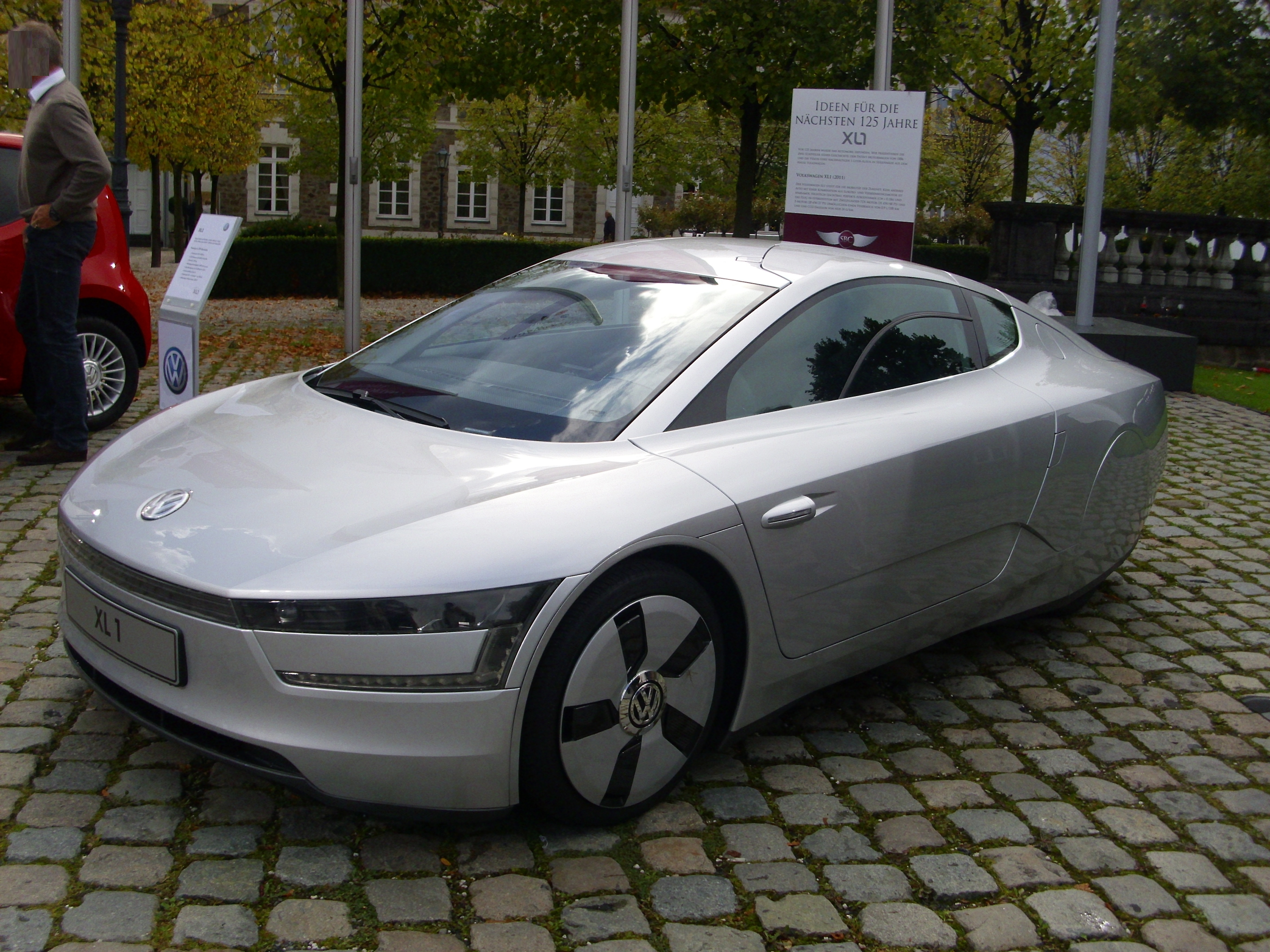
The Volkswagen XL1, with potential mileage as high as 261 mpg_{‑US} (0.9 L/100 km), is the most fuel-efficient car in the world.

In 1974 Volkswagen paid a $120,000 fine to settle a complaint filed by the Environmental Protection Agency over the use of so-called "defeat devices" that disabled certain pollution-control systems. The complaint said the use of the devices violated the US Clean Air Act.

In 1996, Volkswagen first implemented its seven environmental goals in Technical Development with themes involving climate protection, resource conservation, and healthcare, through objectives such as reducing greenhouse emissions and fuel consumption, enabling alternative fuels, and avoiding hazardous materials. The goals have been revised in 2002 and 2007. Volkswagen was the first car manufacturer to apply ISO 14000 during its drafting stage and was re-certified in September 2005.

In 2011, Greenpeace began criticising Volkswagen's opposition to legislation requiring tighter controls on CO_{2} emissions and energy efficiency, and launched an advertising campaign parodying VW's series of Star Wars–based commercials.

In 2013, the Volkswagen XL1 became the most fuel-efficient production car in the world, with a claimed combined fuel consumption of 261 mpg (0.90 L/100 km). Driving style has a huge impact on this result – "normal" driving produces mileage in the 120 mpg range (1.96 L/100 km).

In 2015, the Volkswagen group admitted to producing certain engine models with software that instructed those models to reduce CO_{2} emissions during approval testing. These levels were significantly reduced from the actual CO_{2} concentrations being released once on the road.

Model year 2017 VW vehicles sold in the US average 26.5 mpg_{US}, about 6% better than the average for all manufacturers. For comparison among major car makers, Honda led at 29.4 mpg_{US} while FCA, the owner of Jeep, Ram, Chrysler, Fiat, and Dodge brands, lagged at 21.2 mpg_{US}.

=== U.S. diesel emission fraud ===
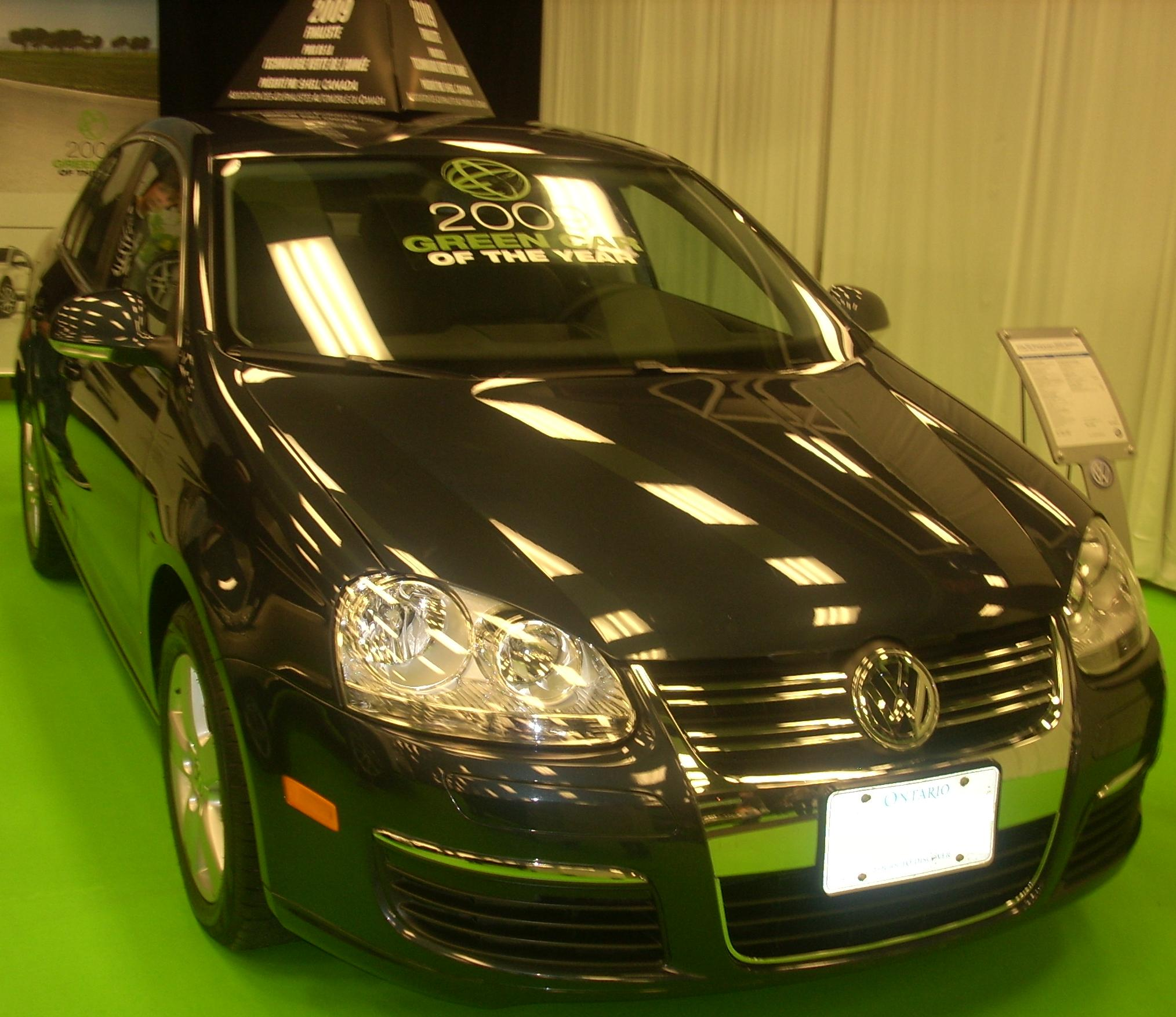
The 2009 Volkswagen Jetta Diesel Sedan was awarded Green Car of the Year. The award was rescinded in early October 2015.

On 18 September 2015, the United States Environmental Protection Agency (EPA) said beginning in 2008 the car maker fraudulently installed engine control unit (ECU) software determined to be a "defeat device", in violation of the Clean Air Act, to circumvent environmental regulations of NO_{x} emissions by diesel engine 2009–2015 model year Volkswagen and Audi cars. The software detects when the cars were being subject to emissions testing, and then fully enables the ECU emission controls to successfully pass. However, during normal driving conditions, emission control software was shut off in order to attain greater fuel economy and additional power, resulting in as much as 40 times more pollution than allowed by law. Consumer Reports tested a 2011 Jetta SportWagen TDI and found in emissions mode its 0–60 mph time slowed down by 0.6 seconds and its highway fuel economy dropped from 50 mpg to 46 mpg. Volkswagen admitted to using the defeat device, and has been ordered to recall approximately 482,000 cars with four-cylinder 2.0 L TDI engines. United States federal penalties may include fines ranging up to US$18 billion, and possibly criminal charges. On 28 June 2016, Volkswagen agreed to pay a settlement of $15.3 billion, the largest auto-related consumer class-action lawsuit in United States history.

In May 2014, the EPA was first alerted to the issue by the International Council on Clean Transportation (ICCT), reporting results of research commissioned for them by West Virginia University's Center for Alternative Fuels, Engines and Emissions (CAFEE). After 15 months of denying the emissions control systems were deliberately gamed and instead claiming discrepancies due to "technical" reasons, on 21 August Volkswagen acknowledged to the EPA and California Air Resources Board (CARB) their emission controls systems were rigged. This was followed by a formal announcement of admission to regulators on 3 September which took place immediately after the EPA threatened to withhold approval for their 2016 cars. Volkswagen's initial public response came on 20 September, when a spokesman said they would stop all US sales of the diesel models affected. Chairman Martin Winterkorn issued an apology and said Volkswagen would cooperate with investigators. Since emission standards in Canada are close to those in the US, Volkswagen Canada also halted sales of the affected diesel models. On 22 September 2015, a Volkswagen spokesman admitted that the defeat device is installed in ~11 million vehicles with Type EA 189 diesel engines worldwide.

On the first business day after the news, Volkswagen's stock price declined 20% and declined another 17% the following day, the same day a social media advertisement with Wired about "how diesel was re-engineered" was removed as well as a series of YouTube ads titled "Diesel Old Wives' Tales". On Wednesday, 23 September, Volkswagen chief executive officer Martin Winterkorn resigned. Volkswagen hired Kirkland & Ellis law firm for defense, the same firm that defended BP during the Deepwater Horizon oil spill.

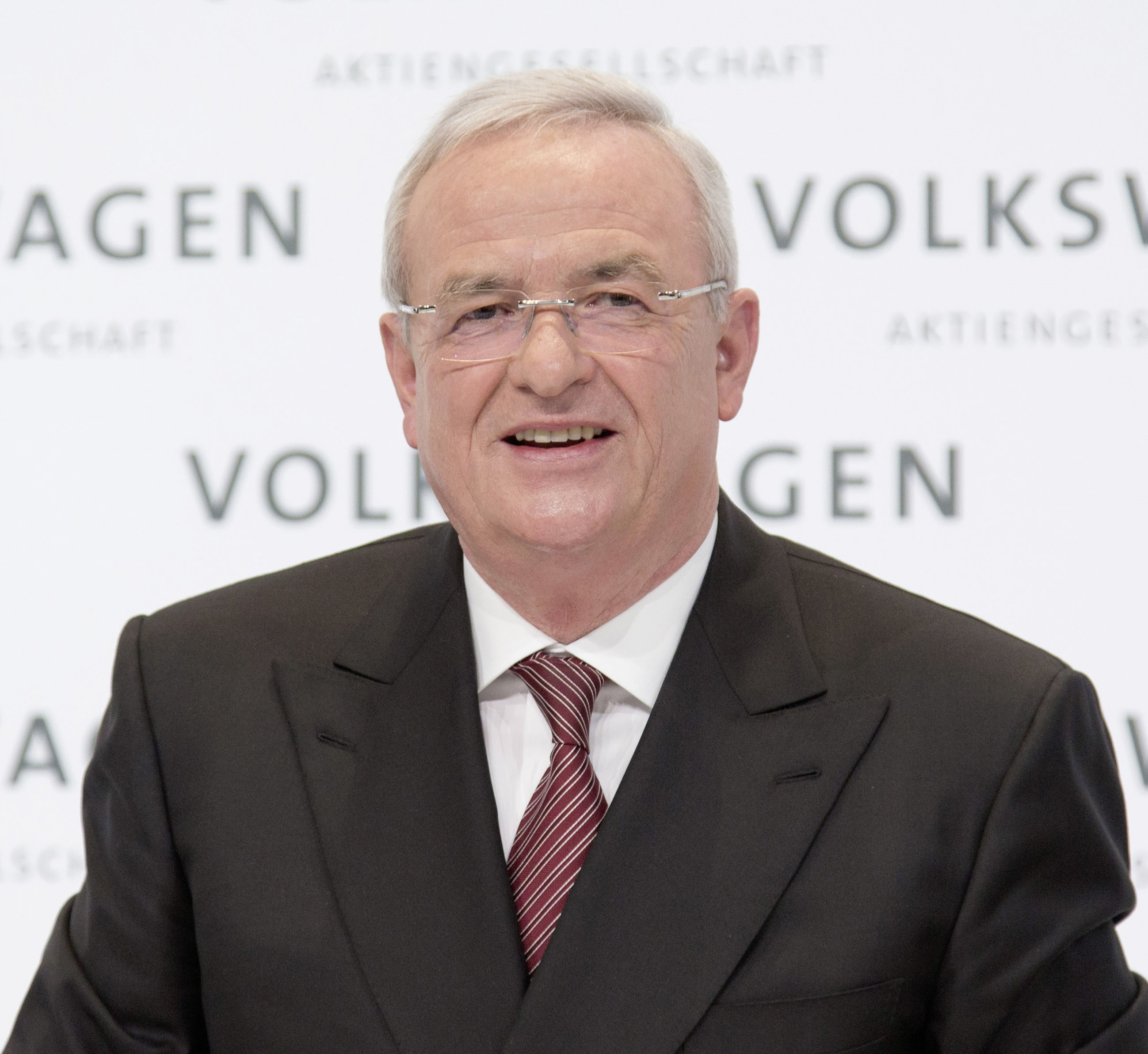
Former Volkswagen AG CEO Martin Winterkorn in March 2015

On 2 November 2016, the EPA issued a second notice of violation (NOV) pertaining to certain diesel 3.0 L V6 equipped Audis, Volkswagen Touaregs and Porsche Cayennes. The EPA found beginning with the 2009 model year all vehicles powered by the V6 were non-compliant. During testing the EPA, CARB and Transport Canada discovered software that activates pollution reduction systems when the automobiles are being driven under federal test conditions, otherwise during real-world driving these devices are inactive. Volkswagen disputed the EPA's findings, stating their software was legally permitted; however, shortly thereafter, Volkswagen issued a stop-sale for the EPA's disputed vehicles and additional models the EPA did not question.

In March 2016, the US Federal Trade Commission sued Volkswagen for false advertising, because Volkswagen's "clean diesel" vehicles were less environmentally friendly than advertised.

In November 2016, Volkswagen and its labour unions agreed to reduce the workforce by 30,000 people until 2021 as a result of the costs from the violations. However, 9,000 new jobs would come by producing more electric cars. Volkswagen also announced plans to become the world leader in electric cars, producing 1 million VW-EVs by 2025 and 3 million by the group, and a VW manager stated that its diesel cars would not become available in the United States.

On 11 January 2017, Volkswagen agreed to plead guilty to the emissions-cheating scandal and to pay $4.3 billion in penalties. Six Volkswagen executives were charged. The following day, one of the indicted executives was ordered to be held without bail pending trial as it was feared that he would flee to Germany and extradition would be impossible. Senior VW management staff were warned not to travel to the US by lawyers working for the company. On 23 January 2017, a US judge approved a $1.2 billion settlement in which 650 American dealers, "who, like consumers, were blindsided by the brazen fraud that VW perpetrated," would receive an average of $1.85 million. The whole scandal was covered in Series 1 of Netflix's 2018 series called Dirty Money in the episode entitled "Hard Knox".

=== Canadian emissions charges ===
On 9 December 2019, Environment and Climate Change Canada charged Volkswagen AG with importing nearly 128,000 cars into Canada that did not meet its emissions standards, but reached a plea deal with the agency in a case involving 60 charges stemming from devices installed to defeat emissions testing.

== Collaboration with Brazilian military dictatorship (1964–1985) ==
In 2015, activists and former VW employees in Brazil spoke out in public accusing the company of being silent about the persecution of its workers, which was during Brazil's military dictatorship from 1964 to 1985. VW's security personnel informed Brazil's political police on eventual oppositional activities. In 1976, mass arrests occurred and some VW employees were tortured.

In September 2020, Volkswagen announced that it signed a settlement with Brazilian state prosecutors, including compensation and donations amounting to 36 million reais (US$6.7 million), to atone for its collaboration with the dictatorship.

== CEO's usage of pun based on Nazi slogan at Auschwitz (2019) ==
In 2019, during an internal event with hundreds of managers, the CEO, Herbert Diess, repeatedly said "Ebit macht frei", ('EBIT will set you free'; EBIT is an acronym for "earnings before interest and taxes") a pun on "Arbeit macht frei", ('work will set you free'), a slogan that famously appeared above Nazi Germany's Auschwitz concentration camp. Diess also acknowledged Volkswagen's "special responsibility in connection with the Third Reich".

== Racist commercial (2020) ==
In 2020, Volkswagen released a commercial that contained references to colonialism and appeared to show a racial slur. When initially faced with criticism the company stated that the "origin of the people depicted is irrelevant." When they faced an additional backlash from their response, the company stated "We distance ourselves from this and apologise."

== Allegations of complicity with human rights abuses against Uyghurs ==
In 2020, the Australian Strategic Policy Institute listed Volkswagen among "companies directly or indirectly benefiting from the use of Uighur workers outside Xinjiang through potentially abusive labour transfer programs." German politician Reinhard Bütikofer, the chair of the European Parliament's delegation for relations with China, criticised Volkswagen on these grounds. Volkswagen subsequently hired a Shenzhen-based law firm to conduct an audit of its factory in Xinjiang. In September 2024, the Financial Times reported that the audit failed to meet international standards.

On 17 June 2022, Volkswagen's anchor shareholder, the state of Lower Saxony, joined Germany’s most powerful union boss in calling on the company to address allegations of human rights abuses in Xinjiang. IG Metall’s Jörg Hofmann and Lower Saxony's minister president Stephan Weil both sat on Volkswagen's supervisory board. In November 2024, Volkswagen announced that it would sell its operations in Xinjiang.

== GPS subscription payment demand thwarting a kidnapped child recovery attempt (2023) ==
A sheriff’s office in Lake County, Illinois released a statement claiming that it was initially thwarted from tracking a stolen car with a 2 year-old boy inside due to the car’s Car-Net GPS tracking service demanding a payment of $150 USD to access to service, as the subscription had expired. The car and child were reported as found just after officers paid the subscription bill. According to Deputy Chief Christopher Covelli, the detective had pleaded, explaining the "extremely exigent circumstance," but the on-call representative didn't budge, saying it was company policy. Covelli then stated that the detective had to work out getting a credit card number and then call the representative back to pay the $150, at that time, the representative provided the GPS location of the vehicle, but the “found” status of the car and child was announced before the GPS could be utilized.

The 2021 Volkswagen Atlas had been stolen from the driveway of a 34 year-old Libertyville, Illinois woman while she was transporting her other child inside her house. Reportedly, a white BMW (which itself had been stolen from a Waukegan car dealership) pulled into her driveway from which a masked man emerged, knocked her to the ground, stole her car, and another man, the driver, ran her over in the process. The car was later located in a parking lot near Pulaski and Route 43, and the child was discovered within the car; the perpetrators fled. The woman was hospitalized with serious injuries to her extremities and remained in stable condition.

Volkswagen has stated that there was a “serious breach” of their Car-Net service while working with the law enforcement officers, and made an official statement that read:

Volkswagen has a procedure in place with a third-party provider for Car-Net Support Services involving emergency requests from law enforcement. They have executed this process successfully in previous incidents. Unfortunately, in this instance, there was a serious breach of the process. We are addressing the situation with the parties involved.

In response to this event, Volkswagen is offering free 5 years of Car-Net vehicle tracking for “most model year 2020 to 2023 vehicles”.
