= DMG interpersonal =

Non-profit in Germany

DMG interpersonal e.V.
- The DMG logo
- Founded: August 12, 1951
- Founder: Hans und Pauline Beck
- Type: Registered association and foundation
- Purpose: A Christian Aid Agency with 405 workers in 80 countries
- Location: Sinsheim, Germany
- Region served: Worldwide
- Services: Charitable services
- Method: Church and social projects, emergency relief, agricultural development, AIDS prevention, education and training, medical work, help for street children, etc.
- Key people: Günther Beck
- Website: www.dmgint.de/index-en.html

Old logo

The Christian-evangelical DMG interpersonal (DMG, former: "German Missionary Fellowship") based at Buchenauerhof in Sinsheim, is one of the largest Protestant missions in Germany. The legal status is a non-profit registered association. Director and chairman of the Board is Günther Beck.

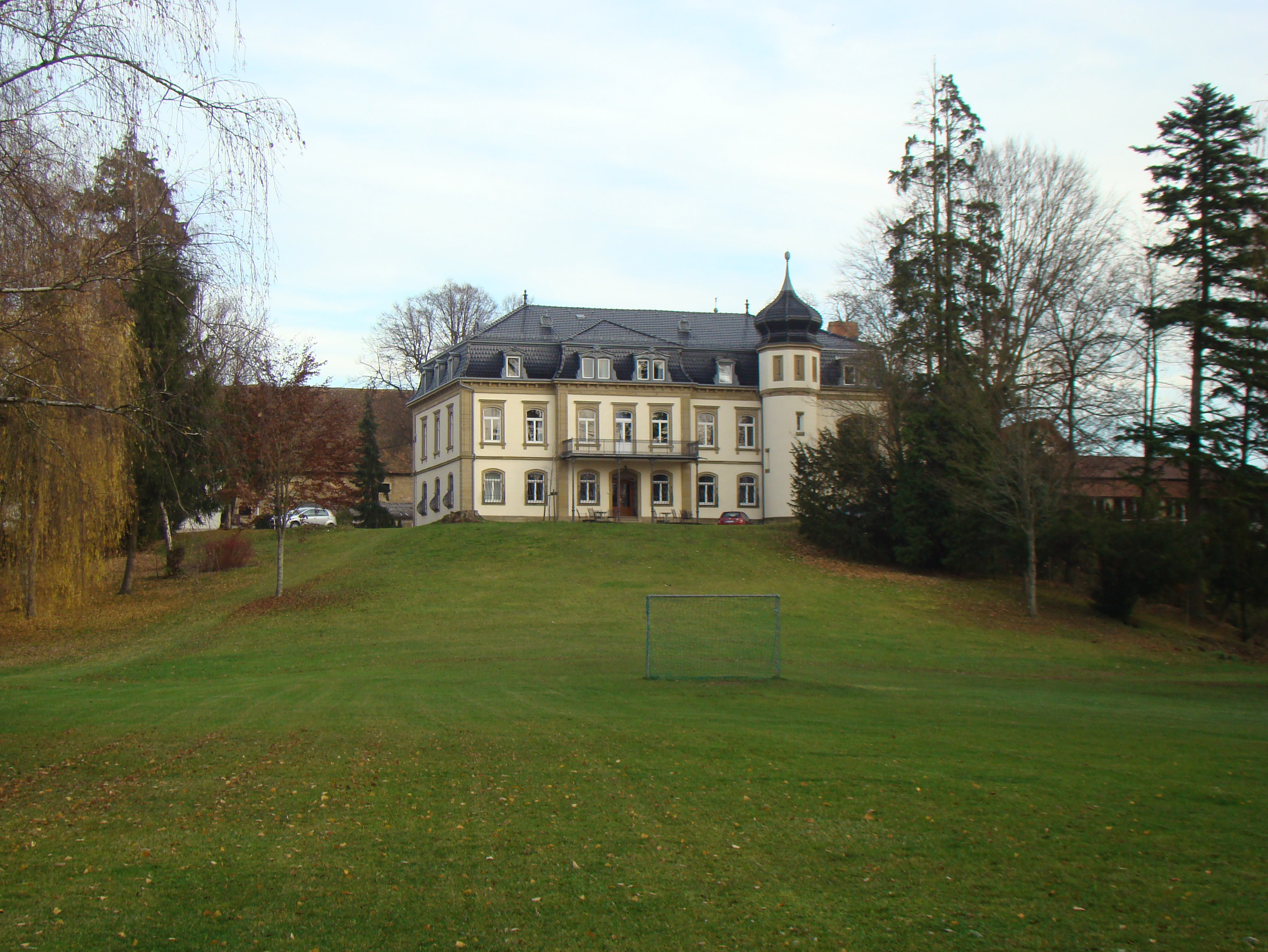
Main building of Buchenauerhof, head office of DMG

== Aims ==
The DMG offers young people, Christian professionals and theologians, the opportunity to serve cross-culturally as a missionary as part of a network of 105 international partner organizations and churches in 80 countries around the world. DMG offers a short-term mission program (6–24 months) for mostly young people aged 18 or older, a medium-term commitment (two to four years), long-term assignments (more than two years) as well as a “50-plus program“, which allows older Christians to use their experience and professional knowledge to help people in other countries In 2018 they had 45 short-terms

The workers seek to live the gospel in word and deed, alleviating suffering, helping people holistically contributing to the circulation of the Bible and to building of Christian communities on four continents. This is done in close partnership and cooperation with the people, churches and Christian organizations on the ground.

== History ==
Founded in 1951 in Beatenberg (Switzerland) as the „German Missionary Fellowship, Association for Charity e. V.“ (DMG), the organization had its first office in a small attic in Stuttgart-Korntal. The first overseas worker Helmut Gaertner was sent to Spain in 1953, where he produced Christian radio broadcasts. Gaertner was later involved in the founding of the ERF-Medien in Germany. By the 1960s, the DMG had around 100 people working worldwide. In 1971 the Christian charity moved to the Buchenauerhof, Sinsheim. Today, around 400 people are employed in various projects around the world. Over the years, DMG built up a network of partnerships with more than 100 churches and nonprofit organizations around the world. DMG supports churches in central Europa in sending Christians to work in the partners projects. In January 2014, DMG was renamed: DMG interpersonal. The new logo was combined with the slogan “so people meet God“.

== Work areas ==
About 405 DMG-workers around the globe are active in the following areas: 'Building Christian communities, pioneering new projects, theological teaching ministry, children's, youth and student mission, relief, famine relief, linguistics, Bible translations, literature production, evangelism, Radio Mission, medical service, agricultural development assistance, flying services, AIDS and hygiene consultancy, assistance for street children, training of teachers, nurses, educators etc.

== Global cooperation ==
In collaboration with 105 local churches and international partner organizations and aid agencies the staff of the German Mission Community works in the following countries and continents:

- Europe: Belgium, France, Netherlands, Spain, Portugal, Italy, Switzerland, Austria, Germany, Czech Republic, Croatia, Romania, Bulgaria, Greece, Armenia, Georgia, Russia and Ukraine.
- Asia: CIS, Central Asia, Mongolia, East Asia, Taiwan, Indonesia, Philippines, Thailand, Southeast Asia, Japan, Pakistan and the Orient.
- Africa: North Africa, Senegal, Chad, Niger, Burkina Faso, Ivory Coast, Benin, Ethiopia, South Sudan, DR. Congo, Uganda, Kenya, Tanzania, Malawi, Zimbabwe, Mozambique, Madagascar, Angola, Namibia and South Africa.
- America: Canada, USA, Mexico, Haiti, Costa Rica, Colombia, Ecuador, Peru, Brazil, Argentina, Paraguay and Chile.

In addition there are currently around 50 short-term workers with DMG working around the world. The DMG's workers come from Protestant Landeskirchen, Free churches and from various Christian churches from around 20 countries, mostly from Germany, Austria and Switzerland. These Christian churches send their cross-cultural workers as employees of DMG interpersonal.

== Membership ==
The DMG is member of “netzwerk-m“ (former: “Ring Missionarischer Jugendbewegungen, RMJ)“ (ring of missionary youth movements) and “Arbeitsgemeinschaft Evangelikaler Missionen (AEM)” (association of evangelical missions). It's committed to the guiding principles of the Evangelische Allianz. This binds them theologically and at the principles on the use of donations.

== Honors ==
- Dietrich Schmoll, who was working for the medical service of the DMG for many years, was awarded with the Order of Merit of the Federal Republic of Germany.
- Ursula Schmitz, who died in 2009, was a DMG missionary doctor in the Christian hospital “Tank” in northeast Pakistan and worked there for 20 years. 2010 she received posthumously the highest Order of Merit of the Republic of Pakistan.
- Andreas Hahn, a theologian formerly active in Wrocław, received the Johann-Tobias-Beck-Preis 2010 (award) of the “Arbeitskreis für evangelikale Theologie” (working group awarded for evangelical theology). The prize of 1000 euros was awarded in December 2010.
- Rose Schwarz, who was working for a medical help project in Kenya was awarded the Order of Merit of the Federal Republic of Germany in 2014.
- Detlef Blöcher, former director until 2018

== Publications of the DMG ==
- Magazine "DMG-informiert" (DMG-informs), run: 44,000, spread mainly in Central Europe, also known as e-paper
- Books and audio books for children and adults
