= Alec Issigonis =

British car designer (1906–1988)

Sir Alec Issigonis CBE FRS RDI
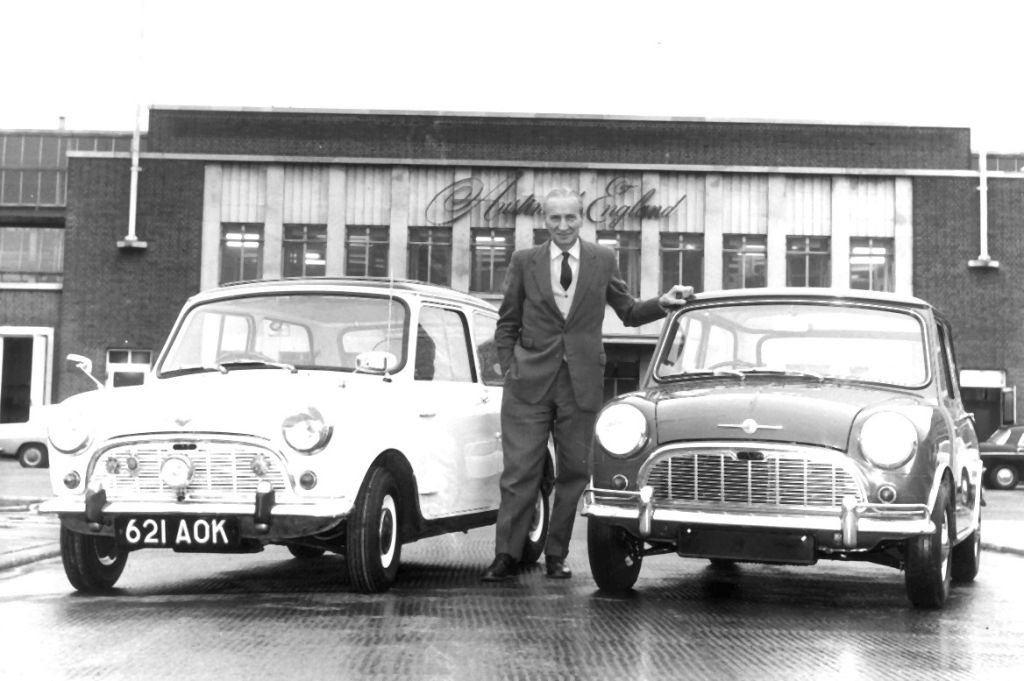
- Born: Alexander Arnold Constantine Issigonis; 18 November 1906; Smyrna, Ottoman Empire (now İzmir, Turkey)
- Died: 2 October 1988 (aged 81); Edgbaston, Birmingham, England
- Occupations: Automotive designer and engineer
- Known for: Designer of the Morris Minor, Austin Mini, and the Mini Moke
- Honours: Knight Bachelor; Commander of the British Empire; Fellow of the Royal Society; Royal Designer for Industry

Sir Alexander Arnold Constantine Issigonis (Greek: Αλέξανδρος Άρνολντ Κωνσταντίνος Ισηγόνης) CBE FRS RDI (18 November 1906 – 2 October 1988) was a British-Greek automotive designer. He designed the Mini, launched by the British Motor Corporation in 1959, and voted the second most influential car of the 20th century in 1999.

== Early life and education ==
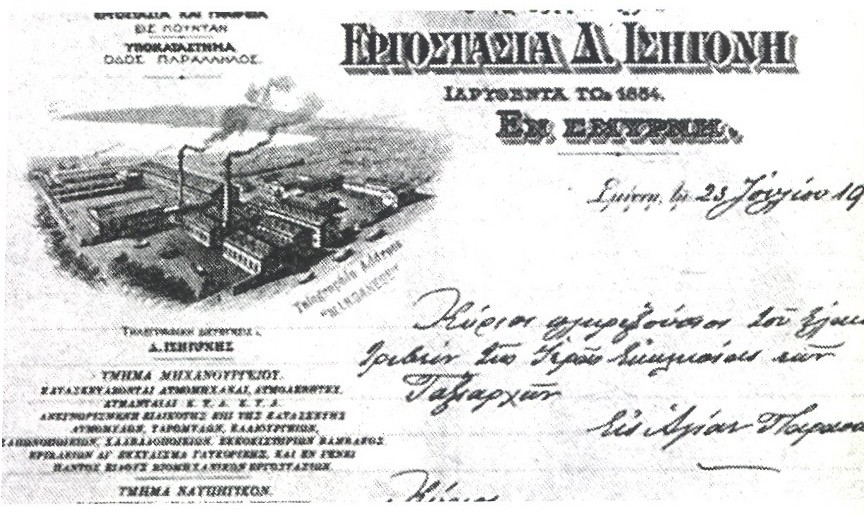
Letterhead of the Issigonis factory in Smyrna (modern İzmir), 1910

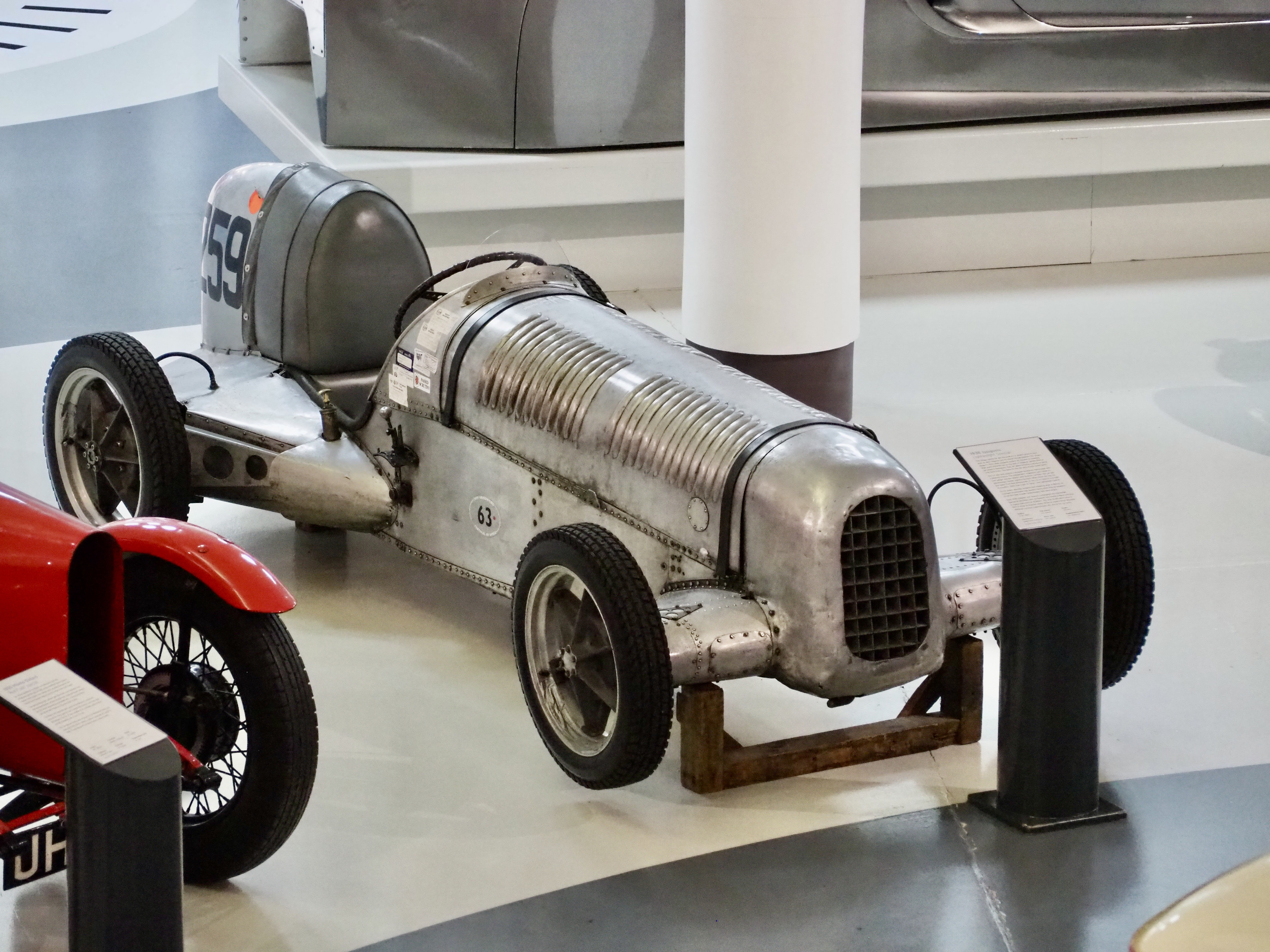
Lightweight Special, British Motor Museum, Gaydon, Warwickshire

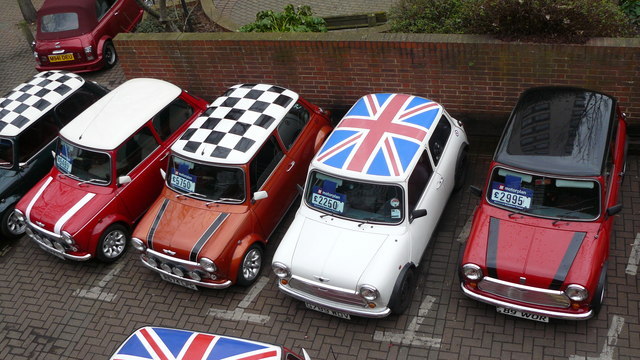
The Mini as a British icon

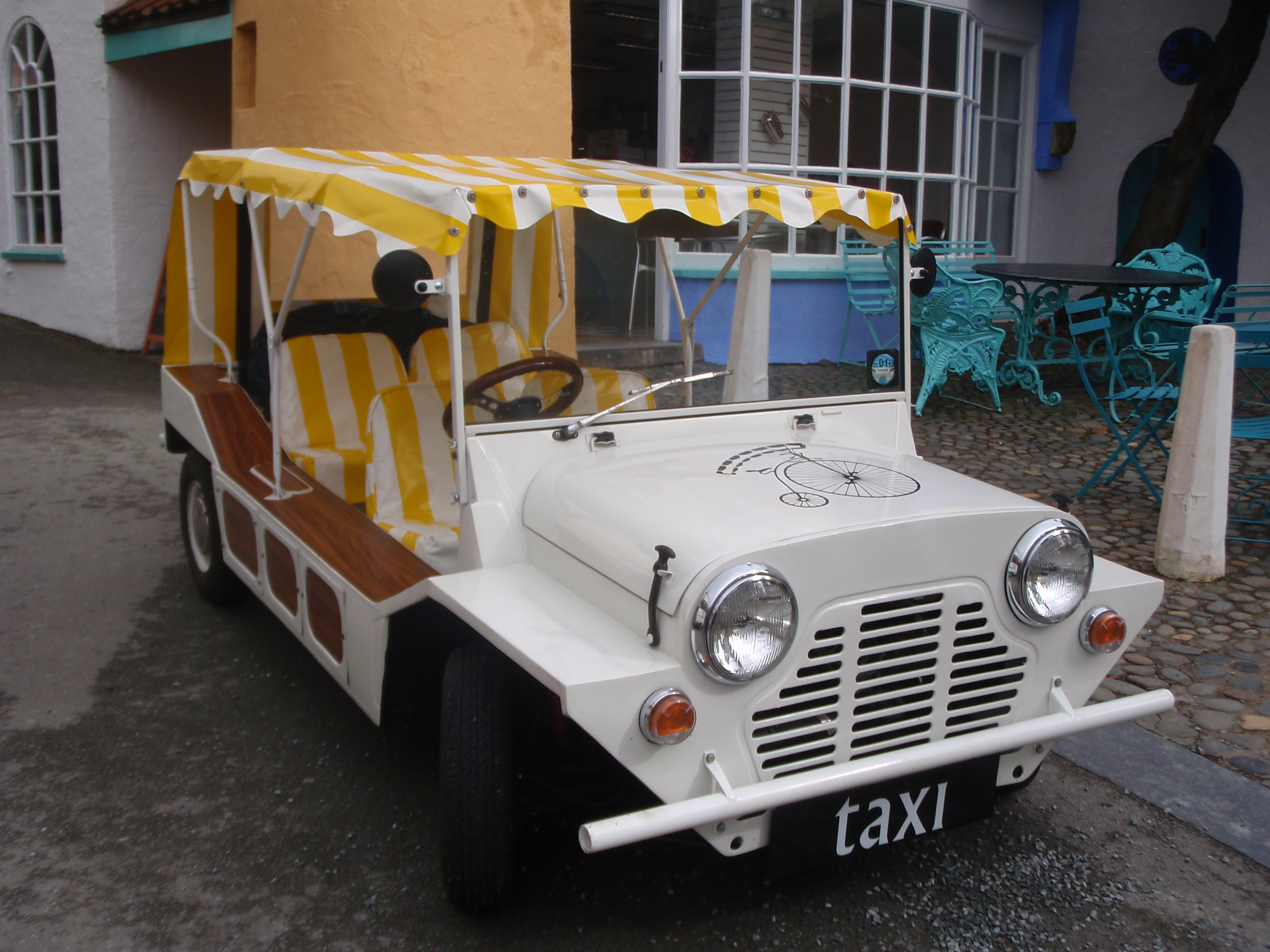
Mini Moke taxi from The Prisoner

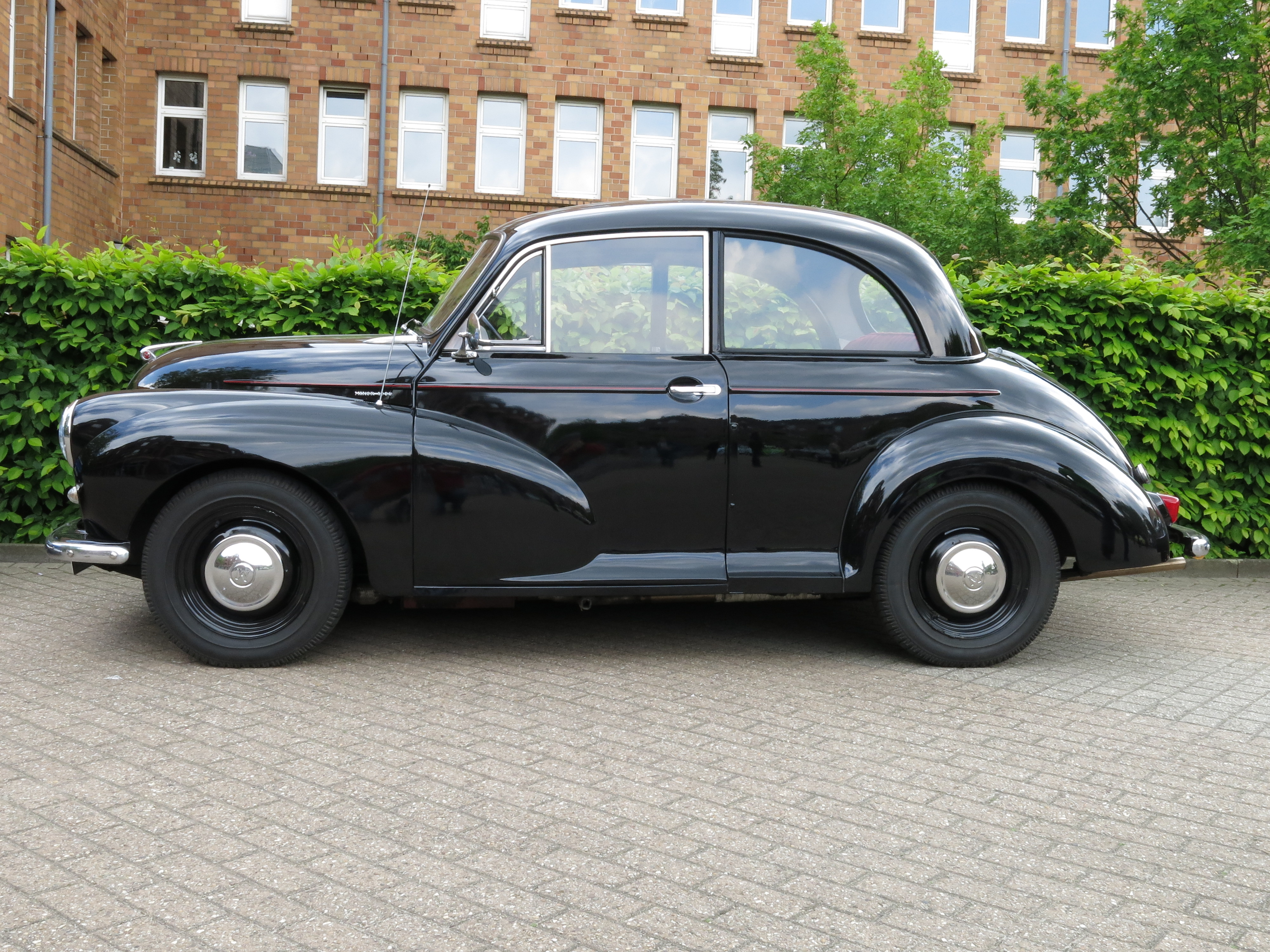
Morris Minor

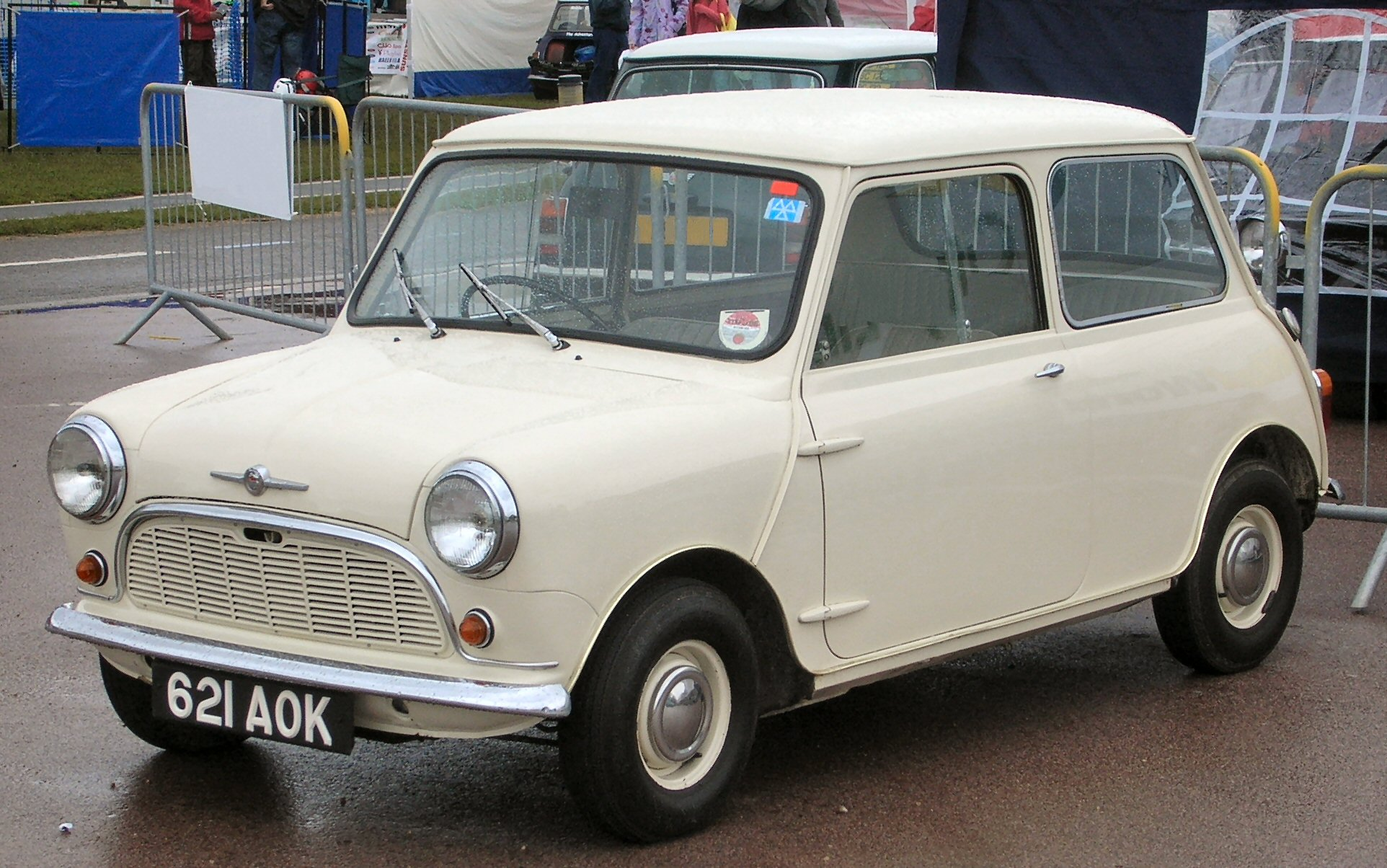
The first Morris Mini-Minor (ADO15)

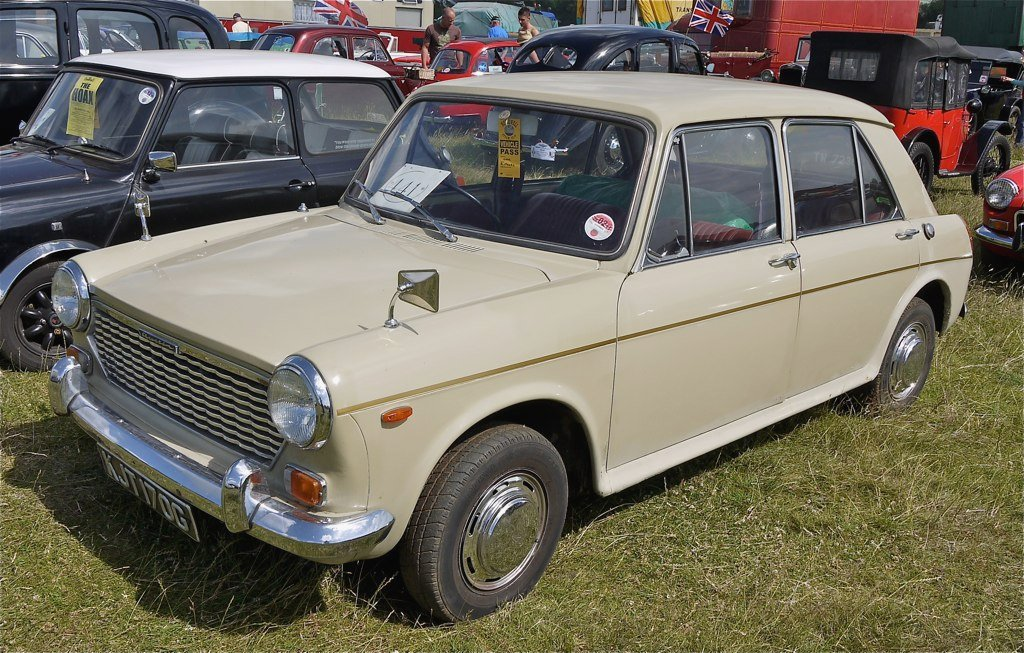
Austin 1100 (ADO16)

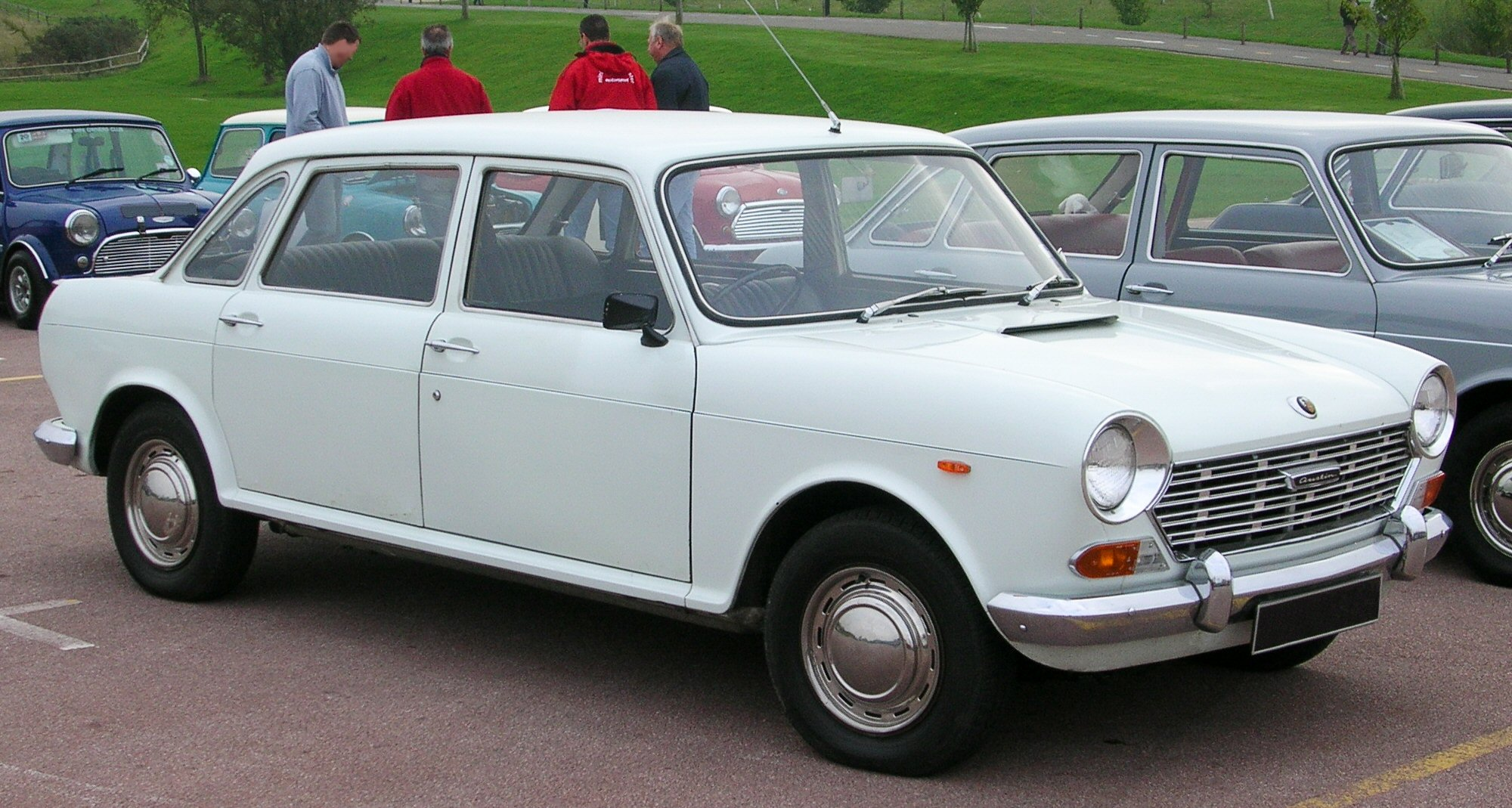
Austin 1800 (ADO17)

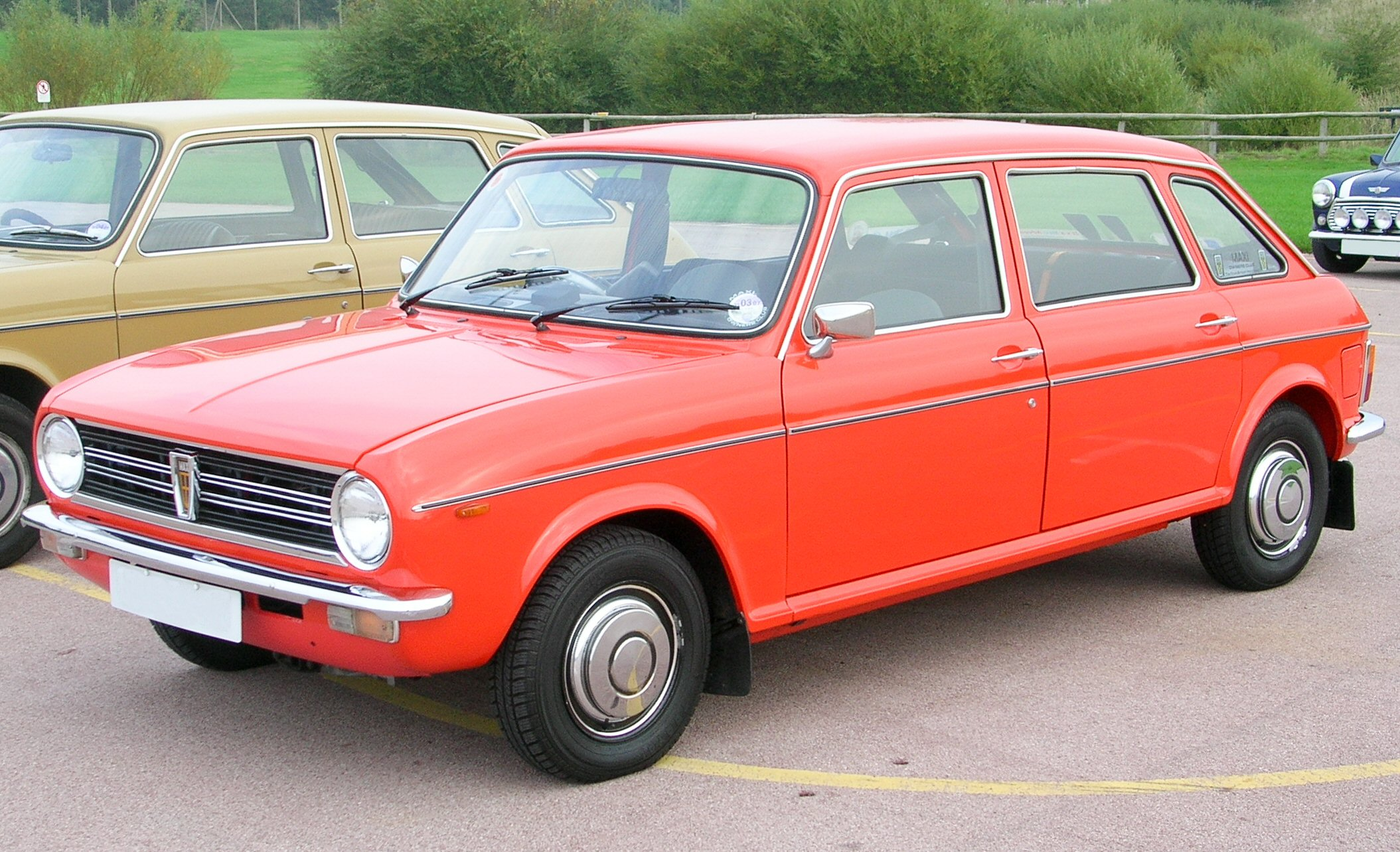
Austin Maxi (ADO14)

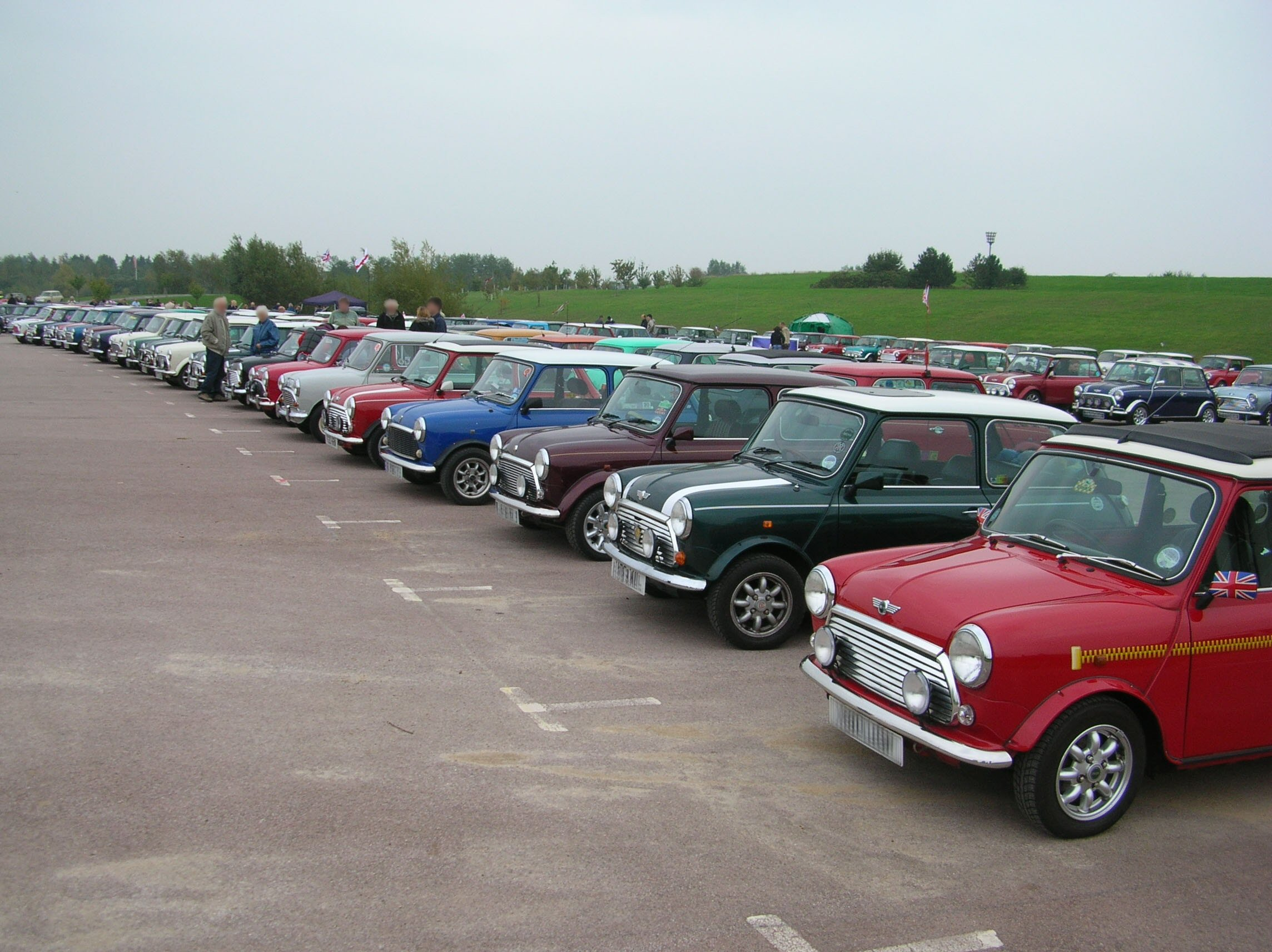
Minis at the Issigonis centenary rally

Issigonis was born on 18 November 1906 in the Ottoman port city of Smyrna, the only child of Constantine Issigonis and Hulda Prokopp. His paternal grandfather, Demosthenis, had migrated to Smyrna from the Greek island of Paros in the 1830s and Constantine was a successful and wealthy shipbuilding engineer. His maternal ancestors originated in the Kingdom of Württemberg. It was through his mother's family that Issigonis was a first cousin once removed of the BMW and Volkswagen director Bernd Pischetsrieder.

As British subjects, his father having naturalised whilst studying engineering in London in 1897, Issigonis and his parents were evacuated to Malta by the Royal Navy in September 1922 ahead of the Great Fire of Smyrna and the Turkish capture of Smyrna at the end of the Greco-Turkish War. His father died shortly after and Issigonis and his mother moved to the United Kingdom in 1923. Issigonis studied engineering at Battersea Polytechnic in London. Having failed his mathematics exams three times, subsequently declaring it 'the most uncreative subject you can study', Issigonis decided to enter the University of London External Programme to complete his university education.

== Career ==
1938 Issigonis Lightweight Special at Goodwood Festival of Speed 2009

Despite the political upheavals the Issigonis family lived an affluent and comfortable life. Issigonis was maintained by his family so that he could pursue racing sport as a hobby. Issigonis went into the motor industry as an engineer and designer working for Humber Limited. He competed successfully in motor racing during the 1930s and 1940s. Starting around 1930, he raced a supercharged "Ulster" Austin Seven, later fitting it with a front axle of his own design, leading to employment at Austin. This greatly modified machine was replaced with a radical special completed in 1939, the Lightweight Special, constructed of plywood laminated in aluminium sheeting. The suspension was also of advanced design, with trailing arm front suspension attached to a steel cross-member, and swing axle rear, all with rubber springs made of catapult elastic. This car was remarkably light, weighing 587 lb, of which the engine contributed 252 lb. By the time the chassis had been completed (hard labour; it was all done by hand, no power tools), Issigonis had moved to Morris Motors Limited, but Austin supplied a "works" specification supercharged side-valve engine. Issigonis usually won, even when entered in the 1100cc class if there was no 750cc category. Most events entered were sprints, but he also raced at circuits.

=== Morris Motors ===
In 1936 Issigonis was given the opportunity to work for a leading motor manufacturer as suspension designer. Morris Motors was based in Cowley near Oxford. Issigonis worked on an independent front suspension system for the Morris 10. The war prevented this design from going into production but it was later used on the MG Y-type. He worked on various projects for Morris through the war and towards its end started work on an advanced post war car codenamed Mosquito that became the Morris Minor, which was produced from 1948 until 1971.

=== Alvis Cars ===
In 1952, just as the British Motor Corporation (BMC) was formed by the merger of Morris and Austin, he moved to Alvis Cars where he designed an advanced saloon with all-aluminium V-8 engine, and experimented with interconnected independent suspension systems. This prototype was never manufactured because its cost was beyond Alvis's resources.

=== BMC ===
At the end of 1955, Issigonis was recruited back into BMC, this time into the Austin plant at Longbridge, by its chairman Sir Leonard Lord, to design a new model family of three cars. The XC (experimental car) code names assigned for the new cars were XC/9001, for a large comfortable car, XC/9002, for a medium-sized family car, and XC/9003, for a small town car. During 1956 Issigonis concentrated on the larger two cars, producing several prototypes for testing.

=== The Mini ===
At the end of 1956, following fuel rationing brought about by the Suez Crisis, Issigonis was directed by Lord to bring the smaller car, XC/9003, to production as quickly as possible. By early 1957, prototypes were running, and by mid-1957 the project was given an official drawing office project number (ADO15) for its production drawings. In August 1959 the car was launched as the Morris Mini Minor and the Austin Seven, and soon became known as the Austin Mini. In later years, the car would become known simply as the Mini. Due to time pressures, the interconnected suspension that Issigonis had planned for the car was replaced by an equally novel, but cruder, rubber cone system designed by Alex Moulton. The Mini went on to become the best selling British car in history with a production run of 5.3 million cars. BMC and Issigonis were awarded the Dewar Trophy by the Royal Automobile Club (RAC) for the innovative design and production of the Mini. This ground-breaking design, with its front wheel drive, transverse engine, sump gearbox, 10-inch wheels, and exceptional space efficiency, was still being manufactured in 2000 and has been the inspiration for almost all small front-wheel drive cars produced since the early 1960s.

In 1961, with the Mini gaining popularity, Issigonis was promoted to Technical Director of BMC. He continued to be responsible for his original XC projects. XC/9002 became ADO16 and was launched as the Morris 1100 with the Hydrolastic interconnected suspension in August 1962. XC/9001 became ADO17 and was launched, also with the Hydrolastic suspension system, as the Austin 1800 in October 1964.The same principle was carried over for his next production car the Austin Maxi, however, by then he had become more aware of the cost considerations of vehicle manufacture and warranty costs which were crippling BMC. It certainly appeared by the Maxi development era that Issigonis wanted to "do his own thing" as cost cutting and development costs spiralled. He would instead research his Mini replacement the 9X with its compact transverse engine. He was also responsible for the development of the Mini Moke, initially intended for military use, which later achieved cult status.

With the creation of British Leyland in 1969, its new chairman Lord Stokes quickly side-lined Issigonis as a "Special Developments Director", replacing him with Harry Webster as the new Technical Director (Small/Medium cars). Stokes was heard on his appointment to say: "We'll sharp sort this bloke Issigonis out!".

=== Acclaim as an engineer ===
Issigonis was nicknamed "the Greek god" by his contemporaries. Whilst he is most famous for his creation of the Mini, he was most proud of his participation in the design of the Morris Minor. He judged that it combined many of the luxuries and conveniences of a good motor car with a price suitable for the working classes; in contrast to the Mini which was a spartan design. Issigonis often commented to friends and colleagues that the Austin 1800 (ADO17) was the design he was most proud of, even though it never was as commercially successful as his three preceding designs.

Issigonis officially retired from the motor industry in 1971. He continued working until shortly before his death in 1988 at his house in Edgbaston, Birmingham. He was cremated at the Lodge Hill Cemetery in Selly Oak.

== Legacy ==
On 15 October 2006 a rally was held at the Heritage Motor Centre in Gaydon, England, to celebrate the centenary of Issigonis's birth.

There is a road named "Alec Issigonis Way" in the Oxford Business Park on the former site of the Morris Motors factory in Cowley, Oxfordshire.

== Honours ==
Issigonis was appointed a Commander of the Order of the British Empire (CBE) in the 1964 Birthday Honours.

In 1964 Issigonis was appointed a Royal Designer for Industry (RDI).

He was elected a Fellow of the Royal Society (FRS) in 1967.

He was granted the rank of Knight Bachelor in the 1969 Birthday Honours and was knighted by Queen Elizabeth II during an investiture ceremony at Buckingham Palace on 22 July of the same year.

In 2003 he was inducted into the Automotive Hall of Fame in the United States.

The Weeny Issi, a car based on Mini in 2013 video game Grand Theft Auto V named in his honour.

== Some of his cars ==
- 1948 Morris Minor
- 1948 Morris Oxford MO
- 1959 Mini
- 1962 BMC ADO16
- 1964 BMC ADO17
- 1969 Austin Maxi
