= Detlef Blöcher =

German author, missionary, physicist and director

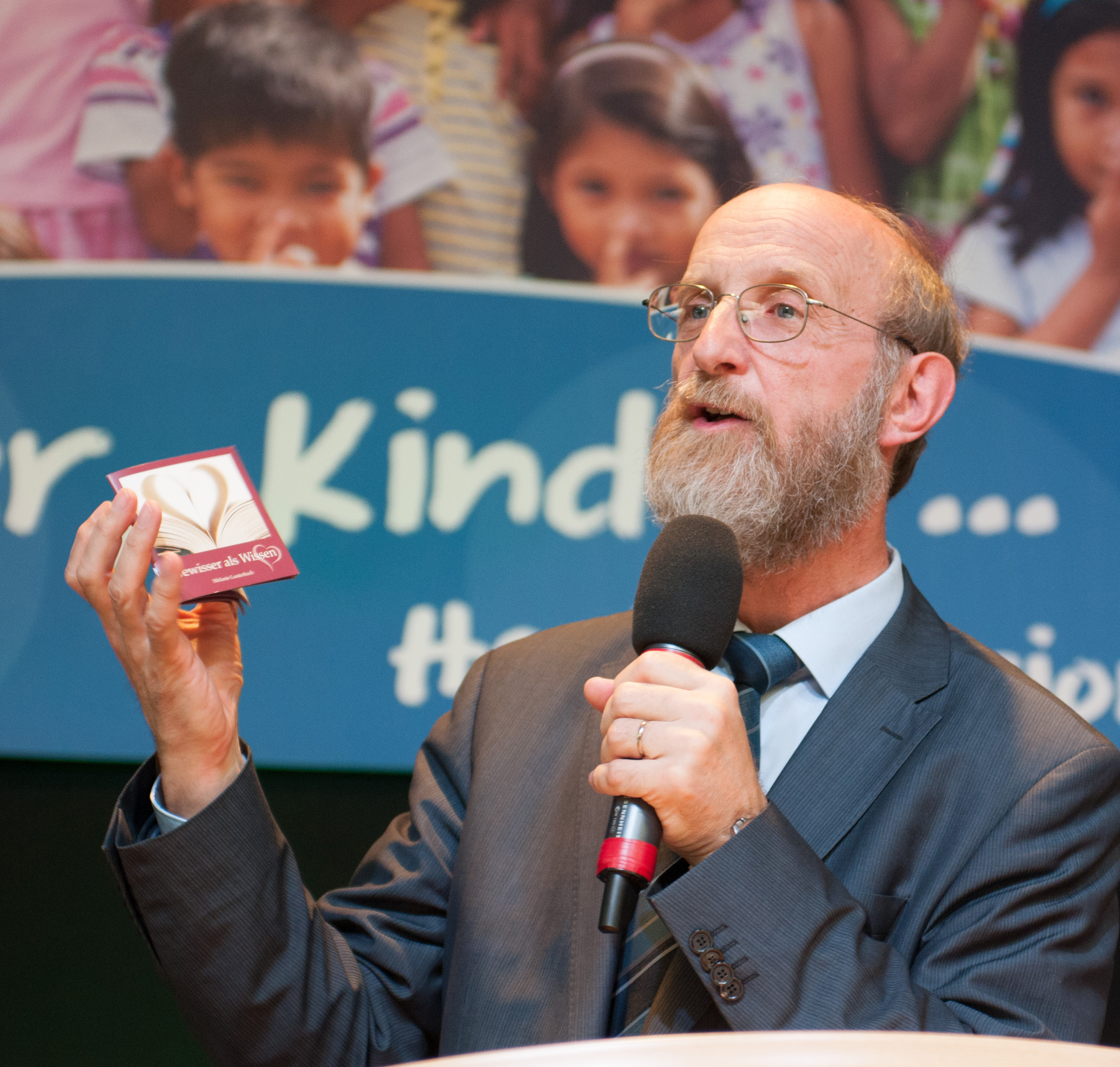
Blöcher in September 2014

Detlef Blöcher (born 15 January 1953 in Frankfurt am Main) has been Director of the Christian Relief and Missionary Work DMG interpersonal in Sinsheim near Heidelberg from 2000 to May 2018. In the years before he worked as a lecturer in the Arab world and as human resources manager for the DMG. He is the author of several international studies and numerous specialist articles.

== Biography ==
The promoted physicist worked in medical research and teaching in Germany, later in his specialty in cancer research and as a lecturer in the Middle East. In 1991 he became human resources manager at DMG. In 2000, he took over the management of Manfred A. Bluthardt.

Since 1996 Detlef Blöcher is also an associate of the World Evangelical Alliance (WEA), on whose behalf he has directed several missiological research projects. In this context specialized articles about the studies REMAP I and REMAP II, dealing with the methods, effectiveness and limitations of modern Christian mission work, have been published. In addition Blöcher is an expert on Christian missions and development aid and has published numerous specialist articles in Christian journals such as the magazine Entscheidung and idea spectrum.

Since 2004 Blöcher has also been active as chairman of the "Arbeitsgemeinschaft Evangelikaler Missionen" (AEM, Arbeitsgemeinschaft Evangelical Missions).

== Publications ==
- Detlef Blöcher (1981), Strahleninduzierte DNA-Doppelstrangbrüche in Ehrlich Ascites Tumorzellen und ihre mögliche Bedeutung für das Zellüberleben: Dissertation (in German), Frankfurt/M., p. 247, 820194603
- Detlef Blöcher (2005) [1996], Reducing Missionary Attrition Project (ReMAP): Forschungsprojekt der WEA
- Detlef Blöcher (2005), Retaining Missionaries: Agency Practices (ReMAP II): Forschungsprojekt der WEA
- Jonathan Lewis, ed. (1996), Working your way to the nations. A guide to effective tentmaking: Getting Perspective von Dr. Detlef Blöcher, Downers Grove, Ill.: Intervarsity Press, ISBN 0-830-81905-3
- William Taylor, ed. (1997), Too valuable to lose. Exploring the causes and the cures of missionary attrition: Further Findings in the Research Data Detlef Blöcher (Germany) and Jonathan Lewis (USA/Argentina), Pasadena, Calif.: William Carey Library, ISBN 0-87808-277-8
