= Helmut Panke =

German manager, physicist and businessman

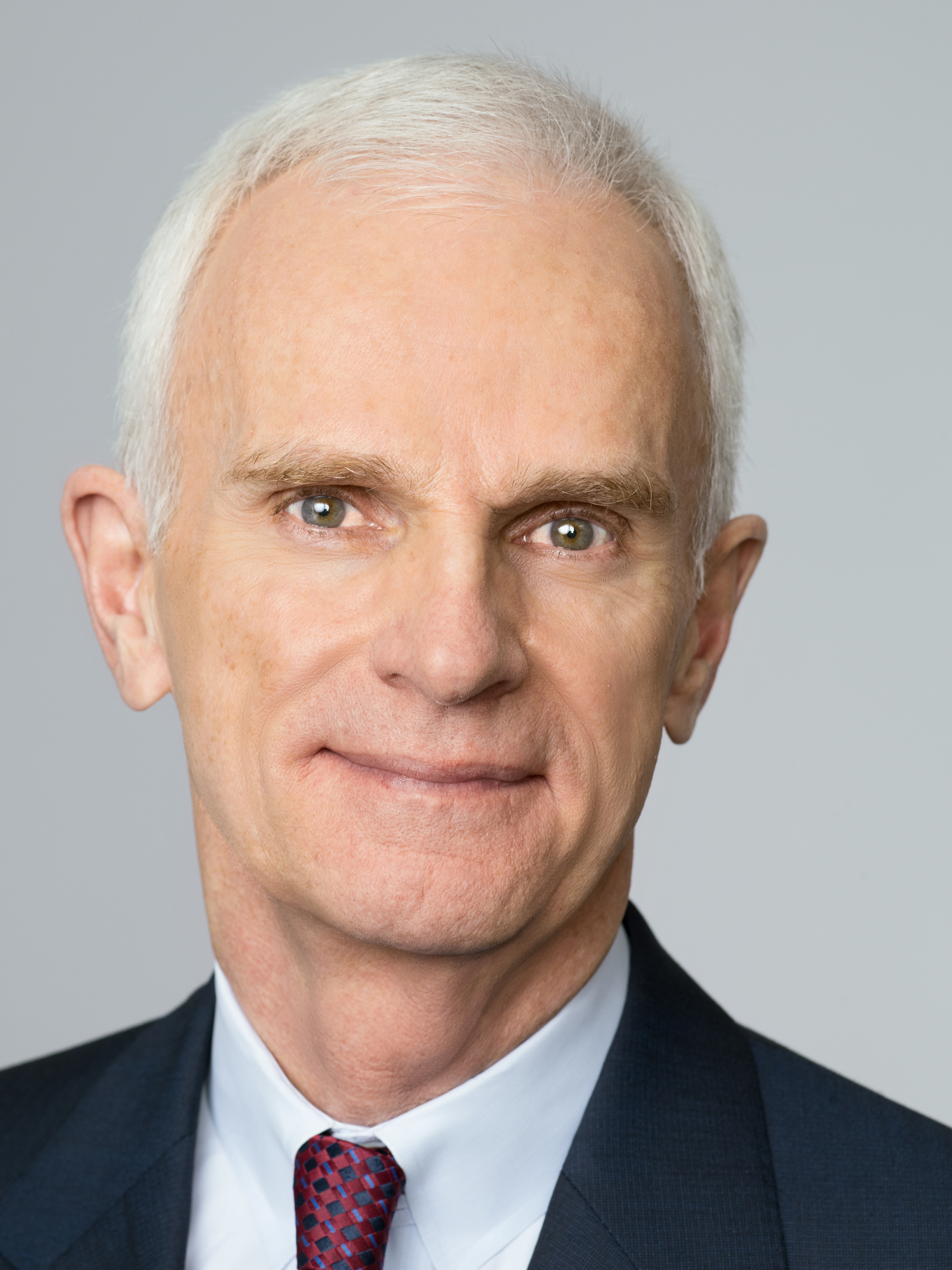
- Born: Helmut Gunter Wilhelm Panke; 31 August 1946 (age 80); Fürstenwalde, East Germany
- Education: LMU Munich; B.Sc., 1968; M.Sc., 1972; Ph.D., 1976
- Occupation: Former chairman of BMW
- Board member of: Microsoft, Singapore Airlines, Bayer AG

Helmut Gunter Wilhelm Panke (born on 31 August 1946 in Fürstenwalde, East Germany) is a German manager and physicist who has been holding board membership in several companies - Microsoft, Bayer AG and Singapore Airlines. During the past recent 30 years, Panke's management career spread over several companies, including e.g. serving as the chairman of the board of management at BMW from May 2002 through August 2006.

== Education ==
In 1972, Panke graduated from LMU Munich in physics, having started his studies in 1968, and received his Ph.D. in 1976.

Prior to his studies, during the period from 1964 to 1965, Panke was an AFS Exchange Student to the United States. After the award of the doctorate degree in nuclear physics, Panke joined the Swiss Institute for Nuclear Research.

== Career ==
From 1976 to 1978, Panke was a researcher at the Swiss Institute for Nuclear Research and a lecturer at LMU Munich.

From 1978 to 1982, he was a consultant with McKinsey & Company. In 1982, he started at BMW as a head of planning and control of the research and development division, before assuming management functions in 1985.

He later said that his attraction to the company was based on the reputation it had for encouraging creativity and independence among its staff.

Over the next 20 years, Panke worked his way up through the company, working in nearly every department: he served as the chairman of the management board at BMW (UK) Capital PLC, and as chairman and CEO of BMW (US) Holding Corporation from 1993 to 1996, he managed the US manufacturing facility that was responsible for building, as well as corporate planning, organisation, staff, IT, finance and sales. From 1996 to 1999, his tasks focused on Human Resources and Information Technology. From 1999 to 2002, he served as a member of the board of management responsible for finance.

In 2002, Panke succeeded Joachim Milberg to become the chairman of BMW after Milberg's resignation for health reasons. During his tenure from May 16, 2002 until September 1, 2006, he was credited with leading the company's internationalization and his refusal to move the company into the lower priced mass market.

== Other activities ==
Panke served on the board of directors for Microsoft from 2003 until 2019, as the first board member from outside the United States. In this capacity, he was also the chairman of the Regulatory and Public Policy Committee, a member of the Compensation Committee and of the Audit Committee of Microsoft.

In 2004, Panke was elected into the board of directors of UBS AG, where he served as a member for eleven years. He left the BoD at the Annual General Meeting of 2015, stepping down due to regulatory provisions regarding the term of office. He also worked as a member of the Human Resources and Compensation Committee and of the Risk Committee from 2008.

In addition, Panke has held the following mandates:

- Singapore Airlines, independent non-executive member of the board of directors (2009-2018)
- Bayer AG, member of the supervisory board (2006-2016)
- Bertelsmann AG, member of the supervisory board (2005-2017)
- Dubai International Capital, member of the advisory board (since 2007)
- Bayer Schering Pharma AG, member of the supervisory board

During his time at BMW, Panke served as a member of the board of directors of ACEA, the Association des Constructeurs Européens d'Automobiles, Belgium, a member of the board of directors of VDA, the association of the German automobile industry, and of the American Chamber of Commerce in Germany.

== Recognition ==
- 2006 – Prize for Understanding and Tolerance, awarded by the Jewish Museum Berlin
