= Bernd Pischetsrieder =

German automobile engineer and manager (born 1948)

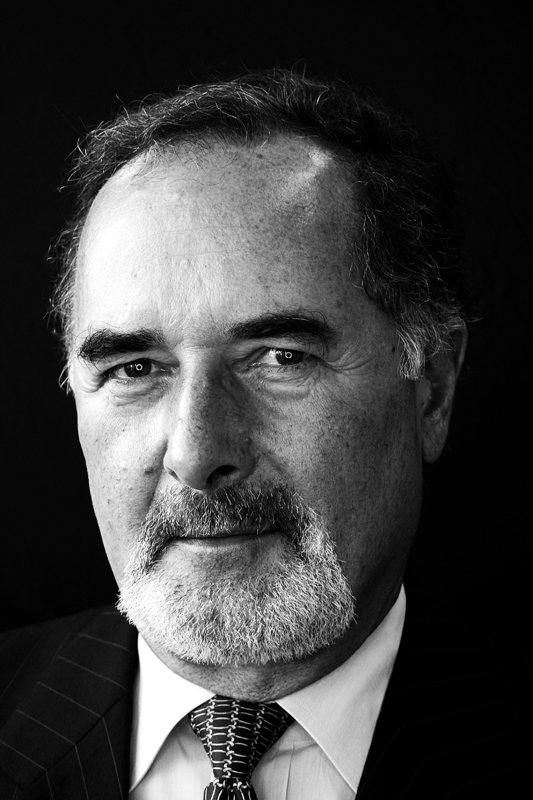
- Pischetsrieder in 2010
- Born: Bernd Peter Pischetsrieder; 15 February 1948 (age 78); Munich, Bavaria, West Germany
- Occupations: Chairman, Munich Re (since 2013); Scania AB (2002 - 2007), Chairman & CEO, Volkswagen AG (2002 - 2006), Chairman & CEO, SEAT, S.A. (2000 - 2002), CEO, BMW (1993 - 1999)
- Known for: Bugatti Veyron

Bernd Peter Pischetsrieder (born 15 February 1948) is a German automobile engineer and manager.

== Early life and education ==
Pischetsrieder was born in Munich, Bavaria, and studied Mechanical Engineering at the Technical University of Munich from 1968 to 1972. He earned the degree of Diplom-Ingenieur.

== Career ==
=== BMW ===
Pischetsrieder began his career at BMW in 1973 as a production planning engineer. He was promoted to become chairman of the board of BMW from 1993 through 1999.

During his time as head of BMW, Pischetsrieder was known for solidifying the company's position as a leader in the luxury car market with a solid sporting and engineering reputation. His decision in 1994 to purchase Rover Group from British Aerospace was widely regarded as a failure on paper. Although many of the assets were sold at vast profit and the purchase brought the valuable Mini and Land Rover marques into BMW ownership, the Rover passenger car operation drained the company's coffers. Rover was sold off in 2000, with Ford taking on Land Rover, and the Mini brand remaining at BMW. A more lasting achievement was the assumption of the Rolls-Royce marque, a deal which left rival Volkswagen Group manager, Ferdinand Piëch, with only the Bentley marque, and the Crewe factory.

=== Volkswagen Group ===
Late in 2000 Pischetsrieder joined Volkswagen Group, mandated initially to take responsibility for quality, as "the voice of the customer" across the group, along with specific responsibility for giving the group's SEAT operation a new focus. On 1 July 2000 he was appointed chief executive officer at SEAT and stayed to this position up to 6 March 2002. On 16 April 2002, Pischetsrieder succeeded Piëch as chairman of Volkswagen AG. At Volkswagen, he directed Bugatti Automobiles SAS to reengineer the Bugatti Veyron 16.4, delaying an expected launch. He continued moving the Audi and Volkswagen marques upmarket to some controversy.

During Pischetsrieder's time at the helm, the Volkswagen share price rose by 80 percent. By 2005, the company regained its position as western Europe's biggest car brand and passed Renault for the first time since 2001 in the region and recorded record global sales. In May 2006, Volkswagen announced that it would extend Pischetsrieder's contract for five years, despite and an earlier expression of no confidence by the company's chairman Ferdinand Piëch. In a surprise announcement on 7 November 2006, however, it was revealed that Pischetsrieder would be stepping down from the top job at Volkswagen AG on 31 December that year. He was to be replaced by Martin Winterkorn, who was head of the Audi division. At the time, the dismissal was opposed by (among others) supervisory board member Christian Wulff.

== Other activities ==
=== Corporate boards ===
- Alfried Krupp von Bohlen und Halbach Foundation, Member of the Board of Trustees (since 2018)
- Tetra Laval, Non-Executive Member of the Board of Directors (since 1999)
- Daimler, Member of the Supervisory Board (2014–2024)
- Munich Re, Chairman of the Supervisory Board (2013-2019)

=== Non-profit organizations ===
- Hilfsverein Nymphenburg, Member of the Board of Trustees
- Wittelsbacher Ausgleichsfonds (WAF), Member of the Supervisory Board
- Hertie Foundation, Member of the Board of Trustees (2001-2016)
- European Automobile Manufacturers Association (ACEA), Chairman (1998)

== Controversy ==
In 2008, Pischetsrieder was one of several former Volkswagen managers who testified before court in a corruption case at the company involving charges of bribery, illicit sex and company-paid shopping sprees. At the time he said that he had first learned of the corrupt practices in June 2005 and subsequently dismissed the employees involved.

== Personal life ==
Pischetsrieder is known to be an enthusiastic driver, and once wrote off a silver McLaren F1 exotic sports car; there were only 64 street legal versions of the McLaren manufactured. Sir Alec Issigonis, the British car designer and engineer who created the Morris Minor and the Mini, was a first cousin once removed of Pischetsrieder which was regarded as the reason why BMW purchased the Rover Group so Pischetsrieder could get his hands on the Mini brand.
