= Martin Winterkorn =

German former business executive (born 1947)

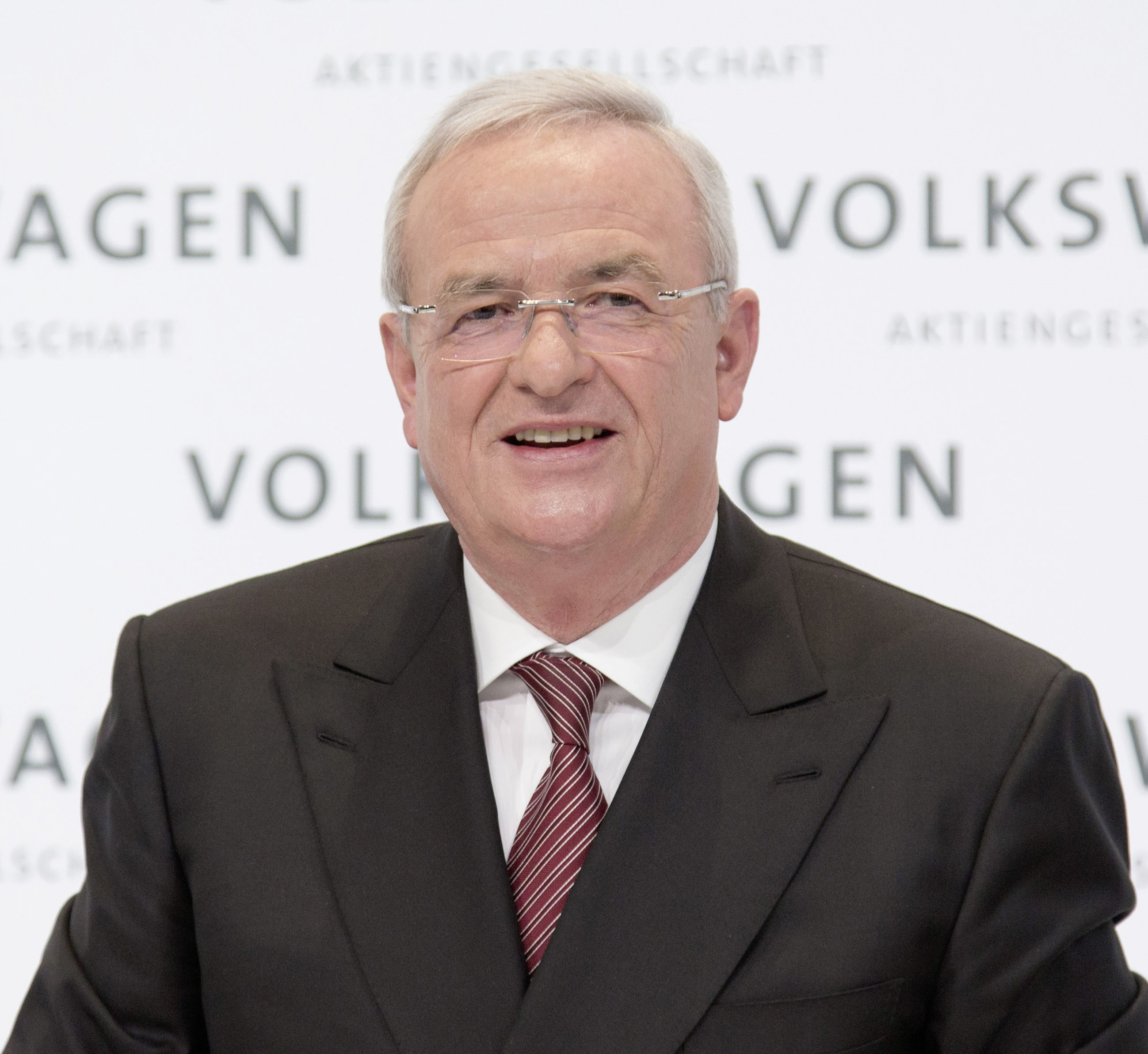
- Martin Winterkorn in 2015
- Born: 24 May 1947 (age 79); Leonberg, Baden-Württemberg, Germany
- Education: University of Stuttgart (MS); Max-Planck-Institute (PhD)
- Occupation: Former Chairman of the Vorstand Volkswagen AG
- Known for: Chairman of the Vorstand for Volkswagen, Volkswagen emissions scandal

Martin Winterkorn (born 24 May 1947) is a German former business executive who served as chairman of the board of management (CEO, Vorstandsvorsitzender in German) of Volkswagen AG, the parent company of the Volkswagen Group, as well as chairman of the supervisory board of Audi, and chairman of the board of management of Porsche Automobil Holding SE. He succeeded Bernd Pischetsrieder as CEO of Volkswagen AG in 2007. Prior to that, he had been chairman of the board of management at the Volkswagen Group subsidiary Audi AG.

Winterkorn resigned from Volkswagen on 23 September 2015 after the Volkswagen emissions scandal came to light. He resigned as chairman of Audi on 11 November 2015, following the disclosure of further information regarding VW's gasoline-powered engines in connection to the scandal. Winterkorn also served on the board of supervisors for German football club Bayern München from 22 February 2003 until 18 December 2018. He is credited with fostering a successful partnership between Audi and Bayern.

Winterkorn was criminally indicted in the United States on 3 May 2018 on charges of fraud and conspiracy related to the emissions cheating scandal. In April 2019, he was also criminally indicted on charges of fraud in Germany. He remains a fugitive in the United States and is wanted by the Environmental Protection Agency on charges including conspiracy to defraud the United States, conspiracy to commit wire fraud, conspiracy to violate the Clean Air Act, and multiple counts of wire fraud. In February 2024, Winterkorn appeared in a German court to testify, where he denied any wrongdoing. His criminal trial in Germany was expected to begin in 2025 after being repeatedly postponed due to Winterkorn’s reported poor health, but in June 2026 the trial was indefinitely suspended due to continued health issues.

== Biography ==
=== Education ===
Winterkorn studied metallurgy and metal physics at the University of Stuttgart from 1966 to 1973. From 1973 to 1977 he was a PhD student at the Max-Planck-Institute for Metal Research and Metal Physics, where he received his doctorate in 1977. He played football as a goalkeeper.

=== Career ===
Winterkorn embarked on his career in 1977, as a specialist assistant in the research division "Process Engineering" at Robert Bosch GmbH. From 1978 to 1981, he headed the refrigerant compressor development group "Substances and Processes" at Robert Bosch and Bosch-Siemens-Hausgeräte GmbH.

In 1993 Winterkorn became head of Group Quality Assurance at Volkswagen AG, and was appointed General Manager of Volkswagen AG with power of attorney in March 1994. He was additionally responsible for the VW Group Product Management from June 1995. In January 1996, Winterkorn took over from Herbert Schuster as Member of the Brand Board of Management for "Technical Development" for the Volkswagen brand. From July 2000, he was Member of the VW Group Board of Management for Technical Development. Winterkorn was instrumental in getting Volkswagen CEO Ferdinand Piëch to approve the production of the New Beetle.

Winterkorn had been chairman of the board of management of Audi AG since 1 March 2002. He headed the Audi brand group, including the brands SEAT and Lamborghini, which was formed on 1 January 2002. Winterkorn also assumed responsibility for Technical Development at Audi AG with effect from 1 January 2003. In his capacity as CEO of the Board of Management of Audi AG, Winterkorn was also Member of the Board of Management of Volkswagen AG.

He succeeded Bernd Pischetsrieder as CEO of Volkswagen AG on 1 January 2007, and by 2014 he was the highest paid CEO of all companies listed on Germany's blue-chip DAX stock market.

Since June 2003, Winterkorn has served as an honorary professor of the Budapest University of Technology and Economics, in recognition of his service to the promotion of research at the establishment. He was featured both in the 2007 and the 2008 Power List of American automotive magazine Motor Trend.

After he succeeded Pischetsrieder in 2007, Winterkorn embarked on the "Strategie 2018" with the goal to bypass General Motors and Toyota by the year 2018, to become the world's largest automaker.

Among Winterkorn's initiatives are the platforms MQB and MLB which standardize the area between accelerator pedal and front wheels (including engines) where 60% of the development costs occur, to reduce cost while increasing design flexibility for the rest of the car.

In the VW Group, he was viewed as having attention to detail, being "product-focused" and "methodical and precise", but also demanding.

=== Diesel emissions scandal ===
In September 2015, Winterkorn apologized for Volkswagen AG having installed software in its diesel cars to allow the vehicles to pass emissions tests by decreasing emissions when the vehicle detected it was undergoing testing but otherwise pollute at amounts well beyond legally allowed limits. Winterkorn confirmed that Volkswagen AG could face fines of up to $18bn, but had not issued a recall at the time of Winterkorn's departure. Winterkorn blamed "the terrible mistakes of a few people," whom he did not name, for the international scandal. Winterkorn resigned as CEO on 23 September 2015, as he accepted responsibility for the scandal while asserting that he was "not aware of any wrongdoing on my part."

Winterkorn additionally resigned as Audi chairman on 11 November 2015. The resignation came a week after additional revelations were made public regarding further vehicle emission test rigging, this time in gasoline-powered vehicles, in amounts approaching one million.

==== Trial ====
In September 2020, the Braunschweig state court ruled that Winterkorn would face trial over his role in the emissions scandal. He faces charges of fraud and market manipulation regarding the installation of the illegal “defeat device” in Volkswagen cars but knowingly failing to inform the markets in good time. The trial started September 2024, but was then suspended in July 2025 due to Winterkorn's health. Winterkorn has since denied all charges.

==== Winterkorn indictments ====
===== United States =====
Winterkorn was charged in a United States indictment with fraud and conspiracy in the case on 3 May 2018. U.S. Attorney General Jeff Sessions stated Winterkorn would be prosecuted vigorously, and added “If you try to deceive the United States, then you will pay a heavy price.”

The criminal charges increased the likelihood that Winterkorn would face similar actions in his native Germany, and impact an existing shareholders lawsuit against Volkswagen.

Additionally, the indictment raised questions regarding Volkswagen’s internal review of the incident, which at the time of the Winterkorn indictment had not been made public. Winterkorn had repeatedly denied knowledge of the widespread Volkswagen emissions test cheating up to the indictment, including his statements before the German parliament, the Bundestag. The chairman of the committee looking into the scandal, Herbert Behrens, was reported to be incredulous at Winterkorn’s statement that he had not heard the term defeat device (the technology at the heart of the scandal) prior to the first news reports about the emissions lawbreaking in 2015.

The indictment specifically references a 2015 business conference in Wolfsburg, Germany where Winterkorn is alleged to have been briefed on, and approved the “continued concealment” of, the defeat device software from U.S. regulators, and notes emails from that year from VW’s then-compliance liaison Oliver Schmidt, who pled guilty in the case in 2017, receiving a seven year jail term.

===== Germany =====
On 15 April 2019, he was also charged in Germany by regional prosecutors of the city of Braunschweig of fraud, of violating laws prohibiting unfair competition as well as defalcation (Untreue). In January 2020 it was reported that the German judge in the case stated that Winterkorn might be allowed to keep 12 million dollars in bonuses, and possibly walk free from the charges. Prosecutors in Stuttgart dropped a market manipulation investigation after deferring to the case in Braunschweig.

In June 2021, it was reported that Winterkorn among other former top managers should pay to Volkswagen around €10 Mn in compensation.

Winterkorn denied responsibility for the emissions defeat device scandal in Braunschweig court testimony in February 2024, stating "I have neither requested nor encouraged this functionality, nor condoned its use.” He was scheduled to go on trial for complicity in the VW diesel scandal in Germany on September 3, 2024. The trial had been delayed due to Winterkorn’s health issues, and is projected to begin in 2025. On 1 July 2025, the court suspended proceedings due to Winterkorn's health issues.
