= Rose Schwarz =

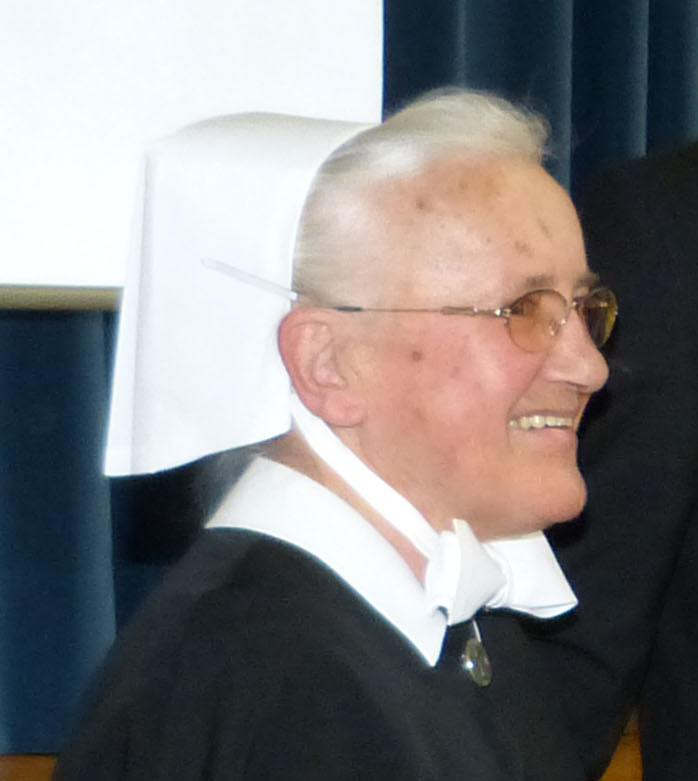
Rose Schwarz

Rose Schwarz (23 January 1935 – 15 October 2017) was a German nurse and missionary who did work with the Reformed Church in Africa.
