= DMG Mori Seiki Co. =

Japanese machine tool builder

DMG MORI Co., Ltd.

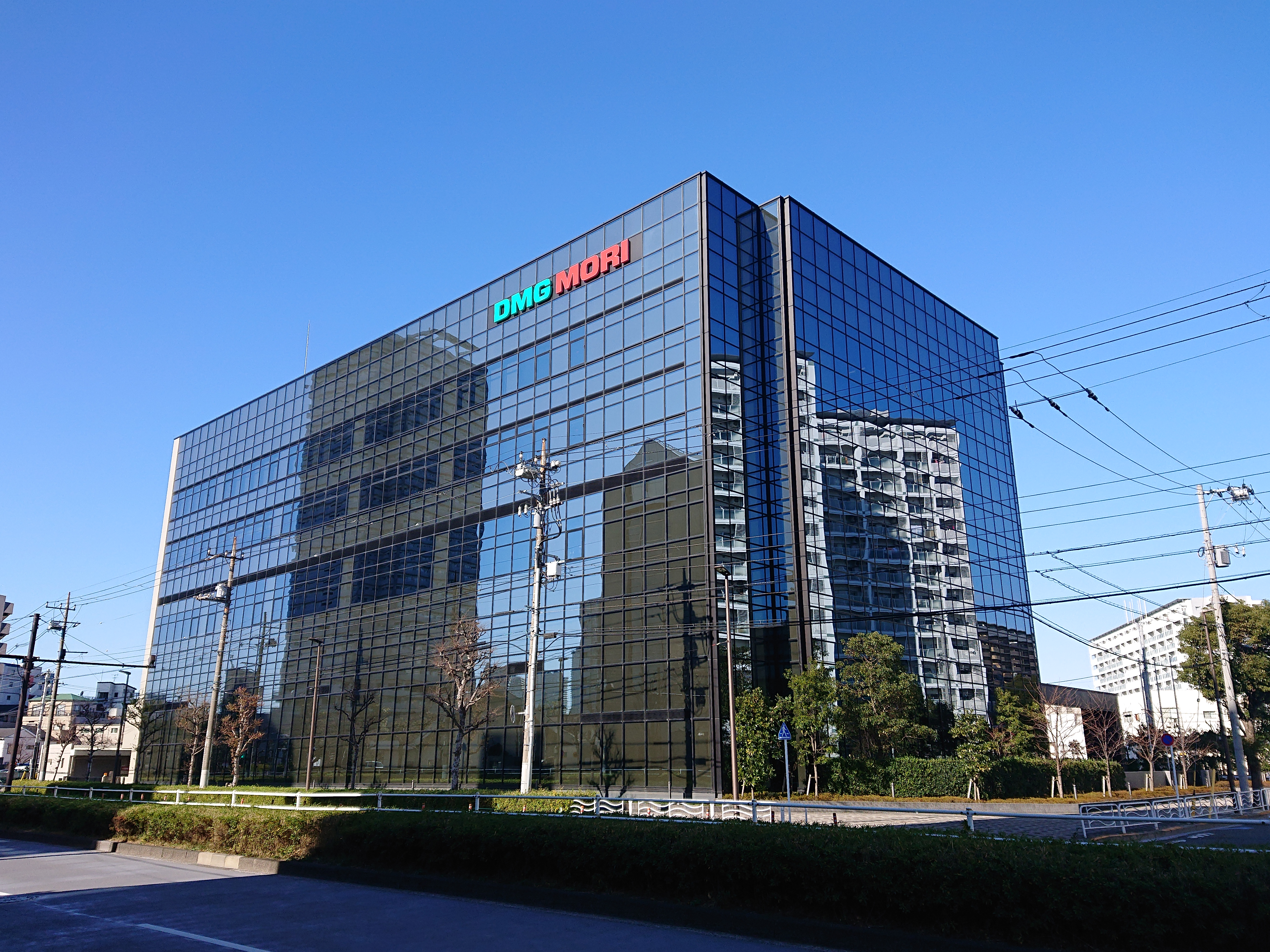
- Headquarters
- Native name: DMG森精機株式会社
- Type: Public KK
- Traded as: TYO: 6141
- Industry: Machinery
- Founded: (October 1948; 78 years ago)
- Headquarters: Global Headquarters: Koto-ku, Tokyo, Japan; Second Headquarters: Nara City, Nara, Japan
- Key people: Masahiko Mori (President)
- Products: Lathes; Machining centers; Milling machines; CNC controls
- Revenue: ▲JPY 539,450 million (FY 2023) (EUR 3,481 million) (FY 2022)
- Net income: ▲JPY 33,944 million (FY 2023) (EUR 223 million) (FY 2023)
- Number of employees: 13,484
- Website: Official website

DMG Mori Co., Ltd. (DMG森精機株式会社, DMG Mori Seiki Kabushiki-gaisha), formerly Mori Seiki Co., Ltd. and DMG Mori Seiki Co., Ltd., is a Japanese company headquartered in Tokyo and Nara City, engaged primarily in the manufacture and sale of machine tools. Since its establishment, the business has become the largest machine tool builder in the world.

== History ==
Mori Seiki was founded in 1948 by the three Mori brothers. It originally produced textile machinery, but in 1958, the company entered the machine tool manufacturing industry, and by 1968, it began manufacturing numerical control (NC) lathes.

In 2001, grinding machine manufacturer Taiyo Koki joined the DMG Mori Group and in 2002, DMG Mori Co., Ltd. acquired business assets of Hitachi Seiki in Japan. In November 2009, the U.S. headquarters were inaugurated during a four-day event.

In the same year, Mori Seiki Co., Ltd. entered into a strategic partnership with Germany's Gildemeister AG, which controlled the brand DMG. As a result, the US operations of both companies were merged into one unit on April 1, 2010. This partnership with Gildemeister AG led to the renaming of the two entities with the same name of DMG Mori in 2013. In 2016, the Japanese company acquired majority shares of the German company. DMG Mori AG, at their AGM of the same year, approved a corporate transfer of the AG's assets to a wholly owned subsidiary of DMG Mori Co., Ltd., provisionally DMG Mori GmbH.

In June 2018, the Tokyo Digital Innovation Center (DIC) was established, along with the opening of a new plant in Pleszew, Poland the same year.

In 2019, DMG Mori Seiki Co. and Tulip Interfaces formed a partnership to integrate Tulip's software into DMG MORI's equipment.

== Company structure ==
DMG Mori Co., Ltd. is directed by President Masahiko Mori (森雅彦, Mori Masahiko), has a revenue of 3.4 billion Euros and employs 12,626 individuals internationally. The company has a dual headquarters system, with headquarters located in Shiomi, Koto-ku, Tokyo (Global headquarters) and in Nara City, Nara Prefecture.

The corporate governance structure is that of a Japanese Kabushiki-gaisha.

DMG Mori has a sales, service and engineering network with 16 Production sites and 113 Sales and Services sites in 43 countries and a leading global market share of 10%.

The shareholders of the DMG Mori Co., Ltd. are Baillie Gifford & Co. (10.0%), Global Alpha Capital Management Ltd. (7.5%), Sumitomo Mitsui Trust Asset Management Co., Ltd. (3.7%), DMG Mori Seiki Employee Stock Ownership Plan (3.6%), Nomura Asset Management Co., Ltd. (3.2%), Mori Masashiko/Mori Seiki (2.8%), Mori Manufacturing Research & Technology Foundation (2.7%), BlackRock Fund Advisors (2.7%), The Vanguard Group, Inc. (2.1%) and Norges Bank Investment Management (1.6%).

=== DMG Mori AG ===
DMG Mori AG, headquartered in Bielefeld, Germany, is headed by Alfred Geißler as CEO and had revenues of 2,365.7 million Euros in 2022.

DMG Mori Co., Ltd., through its subsidiary, holds 87.37 % of the shares in its subsidiary DMG Mori AG.

DMG Mori AG has a supervisory board, which holds a higher rank than the executive board. This supervisory board is entrusted with the tasks of appointing directors and approving major business plans and investments.

=== DMG Mori GmbH ===
At a 2016 AGM of DMG Mori AG, a profit and loss transfer agreement and a dominance agreement were approved, both with DMG Mori GmbH, a wholly owned subsidiary of DMG Mori Seiki, as the controlling company. The terms of the agreements will result in any profits being transferred to DMG Mori Seiki and any losses transferred to DMG Mori AG, with DMG Mori Seiki agreeing to compensate any shareholders of DMG Mori AG with an annual payment, with the option of sale of the stocks at a minimum price available to shareholders at request. As of January 2024, the filing deadline for statements of grounds for appeal has passed.

=== DMG Mori Production sites ===
DMG Mori has production sites in Japan (Nara Campus, Iga Campus, Taiyo Koki and Magnescale), Germany (Pfronten, Seebach, Bielefeld and Stipshausen), Italy (Bergamo and Tortona), Poland (Pleszew) and the USA (Davis). The sites in Germany are run by the group companies Deckel Maho (Pfronten and Seebach), Gildemeister (Bielefeld) and Sauer (Stipshausen). The group companies Gital (Bergamo) and Graziano (Tortona) manage the sites in Italy and Famot (Pleszew) runs the base in Poland. DMG Mori also has a manufacturing partner in India, Lakshmi Machine Works Limited. The company also operated a plant in Ulyanovsk, Russia. In response to the Russian invasion of Ukraine in 2022, DMG Mori claimed to have withdrawn from the Russian market, however, in September 2023, the Russian opposition investigating reporting web-site Agency published an article claiming that the company is continuing its operations in the country. After an internal investigation regarding ongoing production in the Russian facility, the company denied claims that products were delivered to military-related companies. The continued production proceedings were explained through existing binding contracts established prior to the market withdrawal, which still had to be fulfilled to avoid breach of contract claims.

== Products and technologies ==
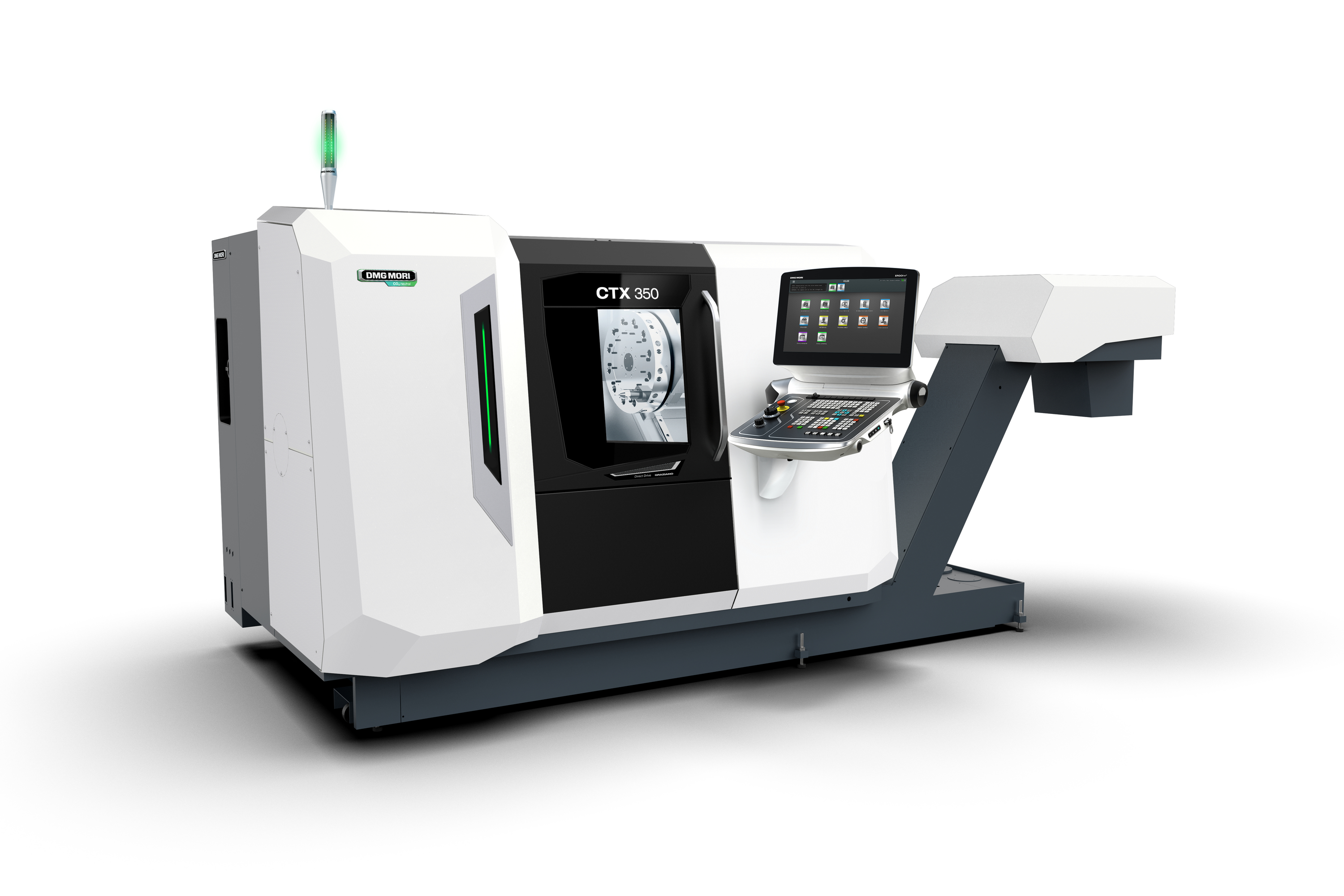
DMG Mori CTX 350 CNC Universal Turning Center

DMG Mori produces and distributes machine tools, corresponding products and measuring instruments. The company manufactures numerically controlled (NC) machine tools like high-speed precision lathes, as well as horizontal and vertical machining centers (MCs), among other machine tools designed for diverse functions. It also deals with machining centers, repair and restoration, engineering services and software.

The company provides 5-axis and multi-axis machines and automation and digitization solutions. It installed 100,000 machines internationally and builds 8,000 to 10,000 machines a year.

== Sports partnerships ==
DMG Mori has partnered with Red Bull Racing Honda since 2012, and also had a partnership with the Toyota Gazoo Racing World Rally Team. In 2020, the DMG Mori Sailing Team completed the Vendée Globe as the first Asian team with Kojiro Shiraishi as skipper.
