= DMG Mori Aktiengesellschaft =

German machine tool manufacturer

DMG MORI Aktiengesellschaft
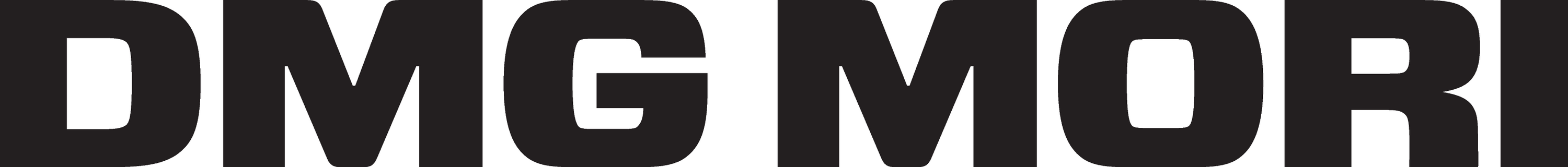
- Type: Aktiengesellschaft
- Traded as: FWB: GIL
- Industry: Manufacturing
- Founded: October 1, 1870 (156 years ago)
- Headquarters: Bielefeld, Germany
- Key people: Mr. Alfred Geißler, CEO; Masahiko Mori, Supervisory Board chairman
- Products: Machine tools
- Revenue: € 2.5 billion (2023)
- Number of employees: 7,515 (2023)
- Parent: DMG Mori Seiki Co.
- Website: en.dmgmori-ag.com

DMG Mori Aktiengesellschaft (stylized as DMG MORI AKTIENGESELLSCHAFT) (formerly Gildemeister AG) is one of Germany's largest manufacturers of cutting machine tools and a manufacturer of CNC-controlled lathes and milling machines. The focus is on turning, milling, grinding, drilling as well as ultrasonic, lasertec and additive manufacturing for customers in aerospace, automotive, die & mold, medical and semiconductor industries. The SDAX listed technology group has 21 production sites worldwide and 161 international sales and service sites.

The company is based in Bielefeld. Until September 2013 it was known as Gildemeister AG, and until June 2015 as DMG Mori Seiki Aktiengesellschaft. In 2015, the Japanese company DMG Mori Seiki Co. acquired a 52.54% controlling stake in the German company DMG Mori Aktiengesellschaft, and in 2016, an ownership transfer to a wholly owned subsidiary of DMG Mori Seiki was approved, but this agreement has yet to conclude.

== History ==
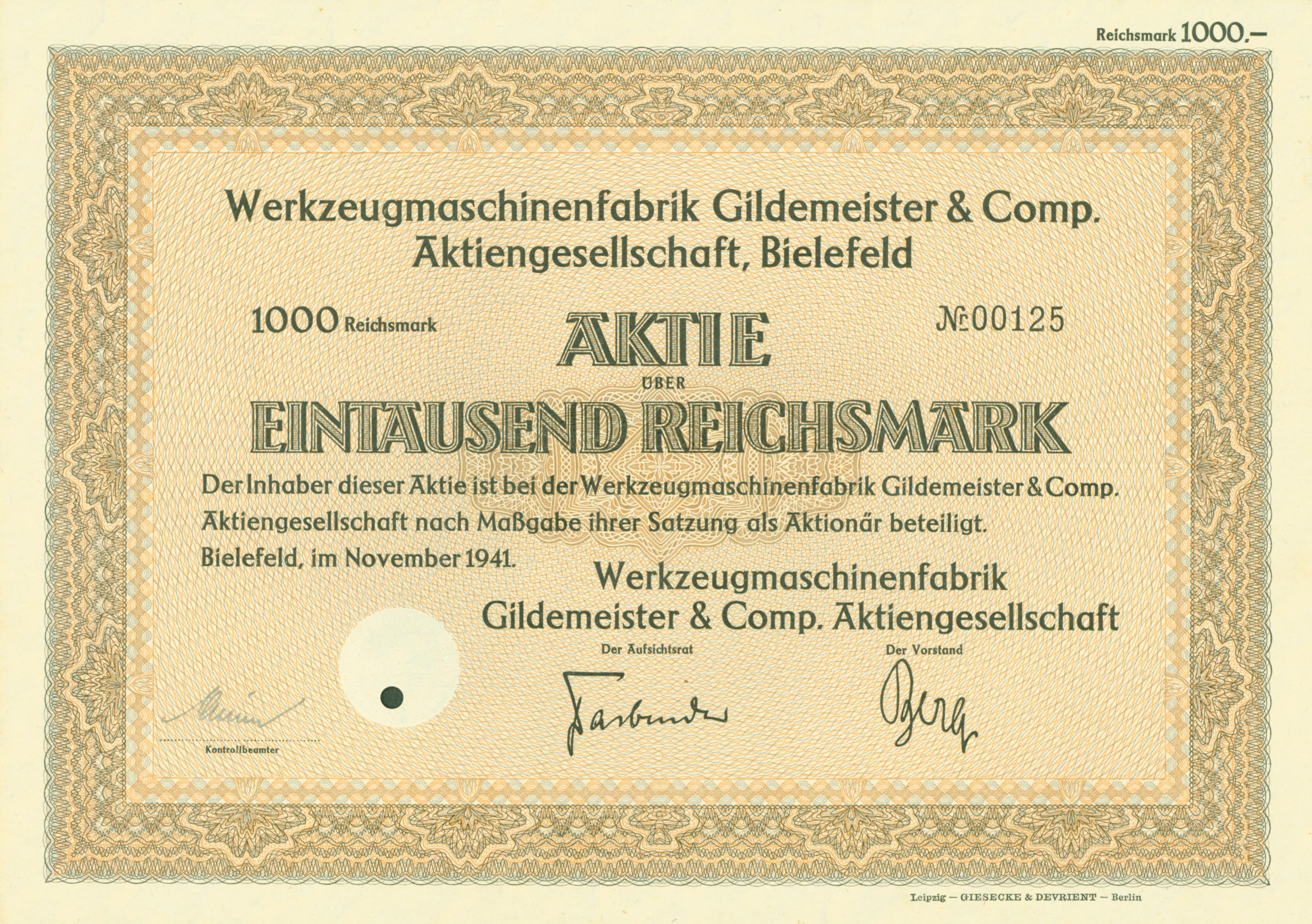
Share of the Werkzeugmaschinenfabrik Gildemeister & Comp. AG, issued November 1941

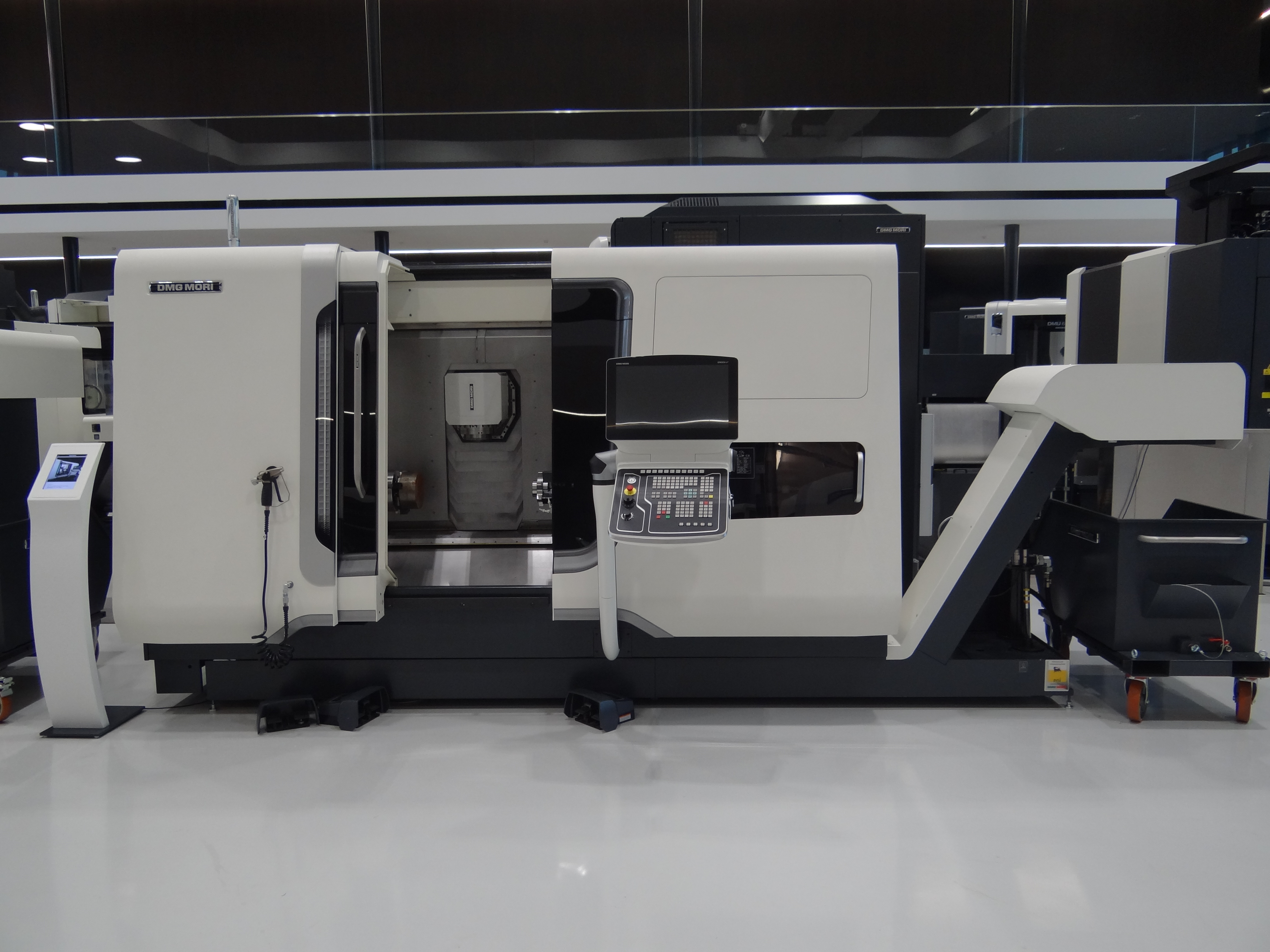
DMG Mori multi-axis CNC mill-turn machine

On 1 October 1870, locksmith Friedrich Gildemeister founded the ‘Werkzeugmaschinenfabrik (Machine Tool Plant) Gildemeister & Comp’ back in the ‘pioneer days’ in Germany. In the following decades, the plant near the Cologne-Minden train station in Bielefeld was expanded to include several production facilities.

In 1890, the company had around 100 employees, among them a wages clerk and three technicians to assemble the machines.

In 1899, the former partnership was changed to a public limited company with capital assets of 1 million Goldmarks. In 1920 five engineers founded Maho AG as Mayr, Hoermann & Cie GmbH. Gildemeister went public

in 1950 and at the end of 1969, the company became a public company with a broad spectrum of shareholders. In 1971 Gildemeister built a high-performance rotary machine for the stretch blow molding of PET bottles.

For over 100 years – until 1976 - the company was based across the street from the main railroad station, where the hotel Bielefelder Hof and the municipal exhibition hall are now situated. Gildemeisterstraße 60 in Bielefeld has since become the group’s headquarters. In 2013, Gildemeister AG employed 7,236 staff and 261 trainees worldwide.

=== Merger of Deckel & Maho. Later Gildemeister ===
In 1993 Friederich Deckel AG and Maho AG merged. In 1994 Gildemeister AG acquired Deckel Maho AG and was renamed Deckel Maho Gildemeister AG ("DMG").

In 2002, Gildemeister received approval from the German Stock Exchange for admission to the ‘Prime Standard’. Following restructuring of the German Stock Index in March 2003, the Gildemeister share was listed on the SDAX. At the end of December 2007, Gildemeister AG was included in the MDAX stock index.

In 2008, the Public Prosecutor’s Office initiated proceedings against the Gildemeister AG CEO, Rüdiger Kapitza. The charges brought against him included embezzlement, fraud, corruption and tax evasion. In late summer, the Public Prosecutor’s Office and the Financial Market Authority, BaFin, stopped their unsuccessful investigations into insider trading. However, proceedings continued in other areas. Investigations in Austria were also finally stopped in March 2013 and Kapitza was cleared of suspicion of embezzlement and fraud.

=== Cooperation with Mori Seiki ===
In March 2009, the company signed a cooperation agreement with the Japanese company Mori Seiki. This agreement allowed the company to further consolidate its sales and service network in global key markets. The cooperation in markets in Taiwan, Thailand, Indonesia and Turkey was followed by the USA and India. Since September 2011, the two companies have continued to further expand their joint market presence in Europe.

In order to strengthen their successful global cooperation, Gildemeister and Mori Seiki signed a cooperation agreement and decided to align their company names. On 1 October 2013, Gildemeister Aktiengesellschaft became DMG Mori Seiki Aktiengesellschaft. Mori Seiki changed its name to DMG Mori Seiki Company Limited. On the global market, both companies used the DMG MORI brand.

On 21 January 2015, the DMG Mori Seiki Aktiengesellschaft signed another cooperation agreement with DMG Mori Seiki Co., Ltd. This agreement specified objectives for strategic growth and sought to consolidate the successful cooperation between the companies. On 8 June 2015, DMG Mori Seiki Aktiengesellschaft became DMG MORI Aktiengesellschaft and DMG Mori Seiki Company Limited changed its name to DMG Mori Company Limited as a further confirmation of the merger. Both companies were main shareholders: DMG MORI AG (Gildemeister), held 9.6 per cent of DMG Mori Co. Ltd. and DMG Mori Co. Ltd. holds 52.54 per cent of DMG MORI AG.

== DMG Mori GmbH ==
In a 2016 AGM of DMG Mori AG, a profit and loss transfer agreement and a dominance agreement were approved, both with DMG Mori GmbH, a wholly owned subsidiary of DMG Mori Seiki, as the controlling company. The terms of the agreements will result in any profits being transferred to DMG Mori Seiki and any losses transferred to DMG Mori AG, with DMG Mori Seiki agreeing to compensate any shareholders of DMG Mori AG with an annual payment, with a minimum sale price of the stocks available to shareholders at request. As of January 2024, the filing deadline for statements of grounds for appeal has passed.

== Controversies ==
On September 20, 2023, DMG MORI AKTIENGESELLSCHAFT was added to the list of sponsors of Russian war by the National Agency for the Prevention of Corruption. This body concluded that it has not severed relations with its Russian subsidiary which continues to assist the Ulyanovsk Machine Tool Plant in producing weapons of war. After an internal investigation regarding alleged ongoing production in the Russian facility, the company denied the claims. The continued production proceedings were explained through existing binding contracts established prior to the market withdrawal, which still had to be fulfilled to avoid breach of contract claims.
