= Volkswagen emissions scandal =

2010s diesel emissions scandal involving Volkswagen

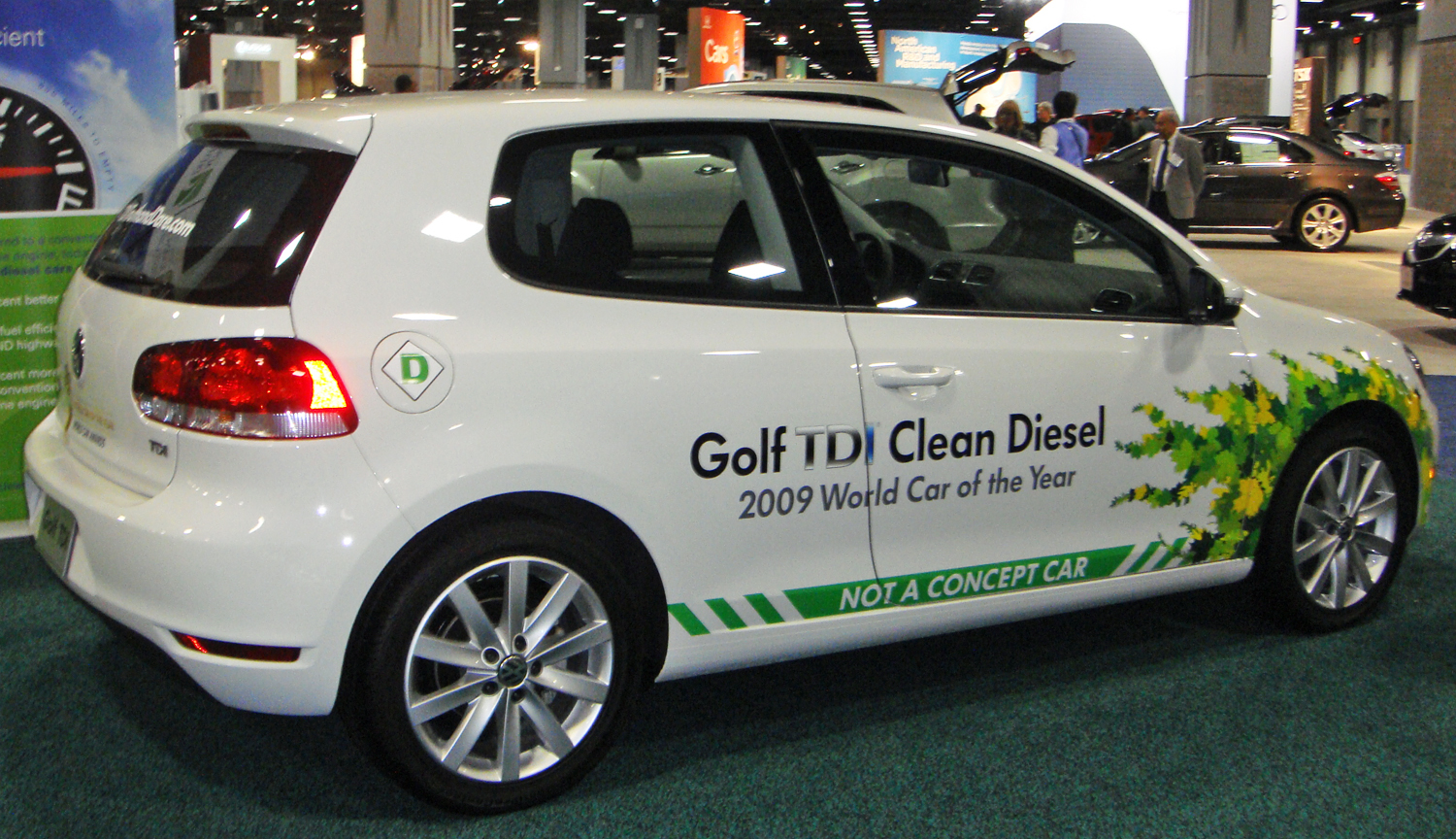
- A 2010 Volkswagen Golf TDI displaying "Clean Diesel" at the Detroit Auto Show
- Date: 2008–2015
- Location: Worldwide
- Also known as: Dieselgate, Emissionsgate
- Type: Emission standard violations
- Cause: Engaging full emissions control only during testing
- Participants: International Council on Clean Transportation, West Virginia University, Volkswagen Group, US EPA, other regulators
- Outcome: Fines and lawsuits
- Website: vwdieselinfo.com

The Volkswagen emissions scandal, sometimes known as Dieselgate or Emissionsgate, began in September 2015, when the United States Environmental Protection Agency (EPA) issued a notice of violation of the Clean Air Act to German automaker Volkswagen Group. The agency had found that Volkswagen had intentionally programmed turbocharged direct injection (TDI) diesel engines to activate their emissions controls only during laboratory emissions testing, which caused the vehicles' NO_{x} output to meet US standards during regulatory testing. However, the vehicles emitted up to 40 times more NO_{x} in real-world driving. Volkswagen deployed this software in about 11 million cars worldwide, including 500,000 in the United States, in model years 2009 through 2015.

== Background ==
=== Introduction ===
In 2013, the International Council on Clean Transportation (ICCT) commissioned the West Virginia University Center for Alternative Fuels Engines and Emissions (WVU CAFEE) to test on-road emissions of diesel cars sold in the U.S. Researchers at WVU CAFEE, who conducted live road tests in California using a Japanese on-board emission testing system, detected additional nitrogen oxide (NO_{x}) emissions from two out of three tested vehicles, both made by Volkswagen. In May 2014, ICCT published WVU CAFEE's findings and reported them to the California Air Resources Board (CARB) and the United States Environmental Protection Agency (EPA).

In September 2015, the EPA announced that Volkswagen had violated the Clean Air Act by installing unlawful software into their diesel vehicles. Regulators in multiple countries began to investigate the automaker, and its stock price fell in value by a third in the days immediately after the news. Volkswagen Group CEO Martin Winterkorn resigned, and the head of brand development Heinz-Jakob Neusser, Audi research and development head Ulrich Hackenberg, and Porsche research and development head Wolfgang Hatz were suspended.

Volkswagen announced plans in April 2016 to spend €16.2 billion (US$18.32 billion at April 2016 exchange rates) in relation to the scandal, and agreed in June 2016 to pay up to $14.7 billion to settle civil charges in the United States. In January 2017, Volkswagen pleaded guilty to criminal charges and signed an agreed Statement of Facts, which set out how the company's management asked engineers to develop the defeat devices, because its diesel models could not pass US emissions tests without them, and deliberately sought to conceal their use. In April 2017, a US federal judge ordered Volkswagen to pay a $2.8 billion criminal fine for "rigging diesel-powered vehicles to cheat on government emissions tests".

Winterkorn was charged in the United States with fraud and conspiracy on 3 May 2018. As of 1 June 2020, the scandal had cost VW $33.3 billion in fines, penalties, financial settlements and buyback costs. Government and civil actions were taken in the U.S. and the European Union, where most of the affected vehicles were located. While these vehicles remained legal to drive in both regions, consumer groups and governments sought to ensure that Volkswagen had compensated affected owners, as it had been required to do in the United States.

The scandal raised awareness over the higher levels of pollution emitted by all diesel-powered vehicles from a wide range of car makers, which under real-world driving conditions exceeded legal emission limits. A study conducted by ICCT and ADAC showed the biggest deviations from Volvo, Renault, Jeep, Hyundai, Citroën and Fiat, resulting in investigations opening into other diesel emissions scandals. A discussion was sparked on the topic of software-controlled machinery being generally prone to cheating, and a way out would be to open source the software for public scrutiny.

=== NO_{x} and Volkswagen Diesel anti-pollution system ===
In general, diesel engines have better fuel efficiency and less carbon dioxide (CO_{2}) emission than petrol engines, but they emit 20 times more nitrogen oxide (NO_{x}) unless somehow treated. Three-way catalytic converters, which have been very effective at reducing NO_{x} in petrol engine exhaust, do not function well for them. As NO_{x} are harmful air pollutants, regulators in the United States and Europe have implemented increasingly stringent NO_{x} emission standards for passenger cars since the early 2000s.

To deal with this problem, in 2005 Volkswagen licensed Mercedes' urea-based selective catalytic reduction (SCR) system called BlueTec for future diesel engine development. While effective at reducing NO_{x}, an SCR system like Bluetec was expensive, high-maintenance and required more space than other methods, making it unsuitable for Volkswagen's compact cars such as Golf or Jetta. Some managers at Volkswagen rejected BlueTec, and preferred to develop their own inexpensive "lean NO_{x} trap" system. In 2007, Volkswagen canceled the licensing deal for BlueTec and announced that it would use its own pollution control technology.

Volkswagen chose the "lean NO_{x} trap" system for its turbo-diesel Golf and Jetta models, but the solution did not work well as it required a fuel-rich exhaust gas in the purification process and fuel economy suffered as a result. Despite these issues, the company continued to market its diesel technology as an affordable and eco-friendly innovation, but this impression projected to the public did not reflect the reality. In reality, the system failed to combine lower fuel consumption with compliant NO_{x} emissions, and Volkswagen chose around 2006 to program the Engine Control Unit (ECU) to switch from lower fuel consumption and high NO_{x} emissions to low-emission compliant mode when it detected an emissions test, particularly for the EA 189 engine. This caused the engine to emit NO_{x} levels above limits in daily operation, but comply with US NO_{x} standards when being tested, constituting a defeat device. In 2015 the news magazine Der Spiegel reported that at least 30 people at management level in Volkswagen knew about the deceit for years, which Volkswagen denied in 2015.

Starting in the 2009 model year, Volkswagen Group began migrating its light-duty passenger vehicle's turbocharged direct injection (TDI) diesel engines to a common-rail fuel injection system. This system allows for higher-precision fuel delivery using electronically controlled fuel injectors and higher injection pressure, theoretically leading to better fuel atomization, better air/fuel ratio control, and by extension, better control of emissions.

Volkswagen described the diesel engines as being as clean as or cleaner than US and Californian requirements, while providing good fuel economy and performance. Due to the good fuel economy provided by its diesel fleet, in 2014 Volkswagen was registered with a Corporate Average Fuel Economy (CAFE) of 34 mpg_{‑US} (6.9 L/100 km; 41 mpg_{‑imp}). The low emissions levels of Volkswagen vehicles tested with the defeat device in operation enabled the company to receive green car subsidies and tax exemptions in the US.

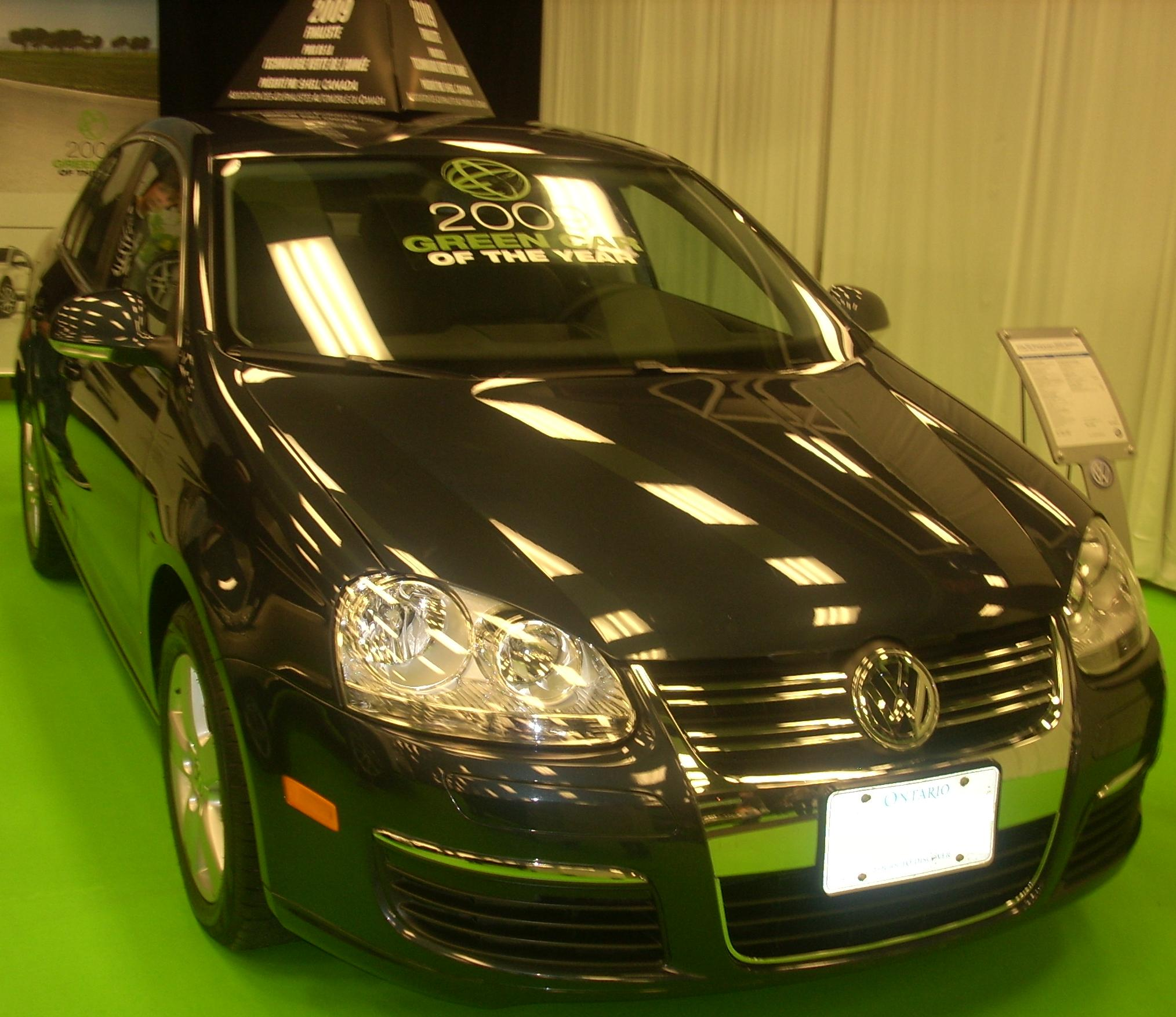
The 2009 Volkswagen Jetta Diesel Sedan was awarded Green Car of the Year. The award was rescinded in early October 2015.

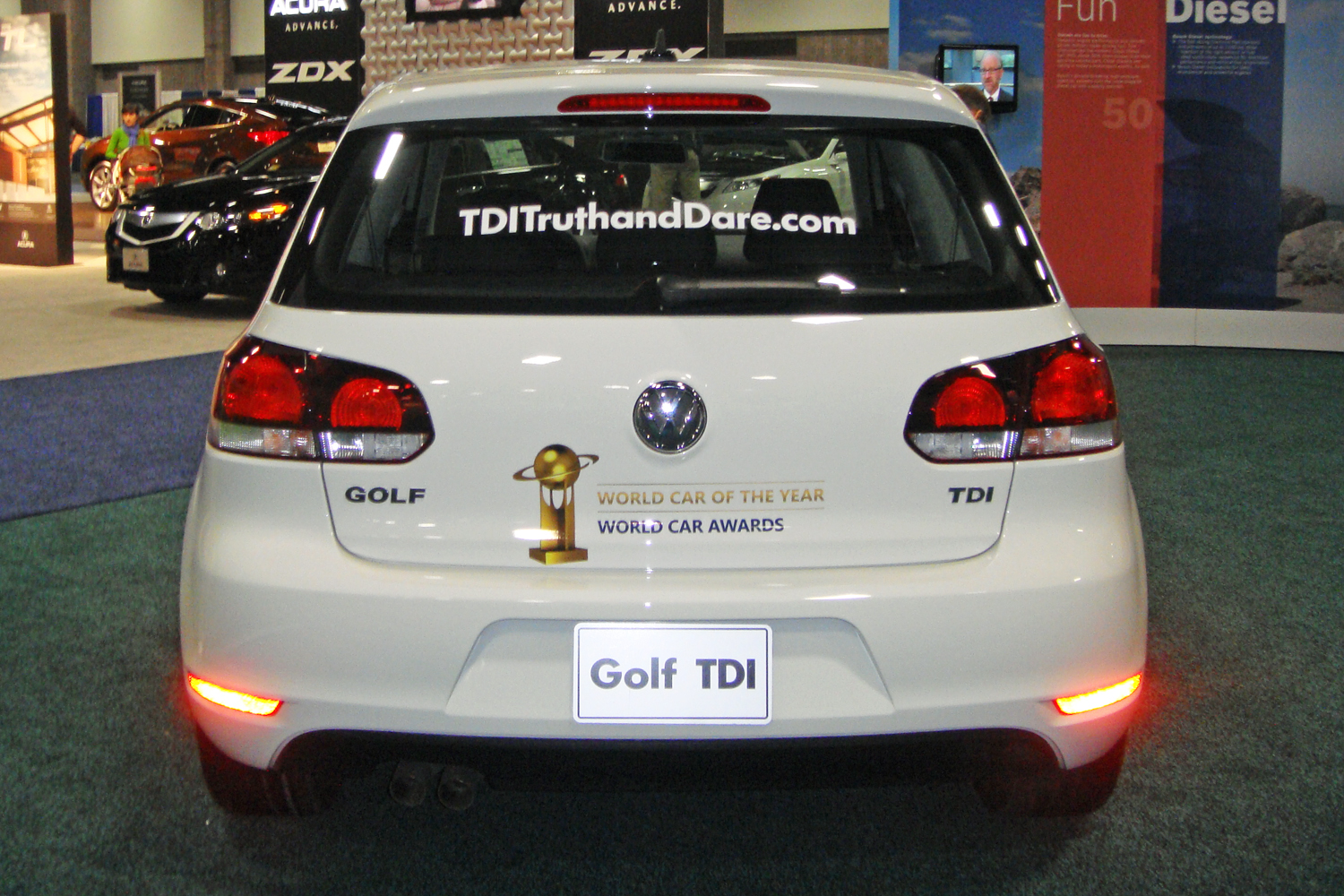
Volkswagen TDITruthandDare.com Clean Diesel campaign advertised on the Volkswagen Golf TDI at the 2010 Washington Auto Show (2009-4, 2009-7, 2010)

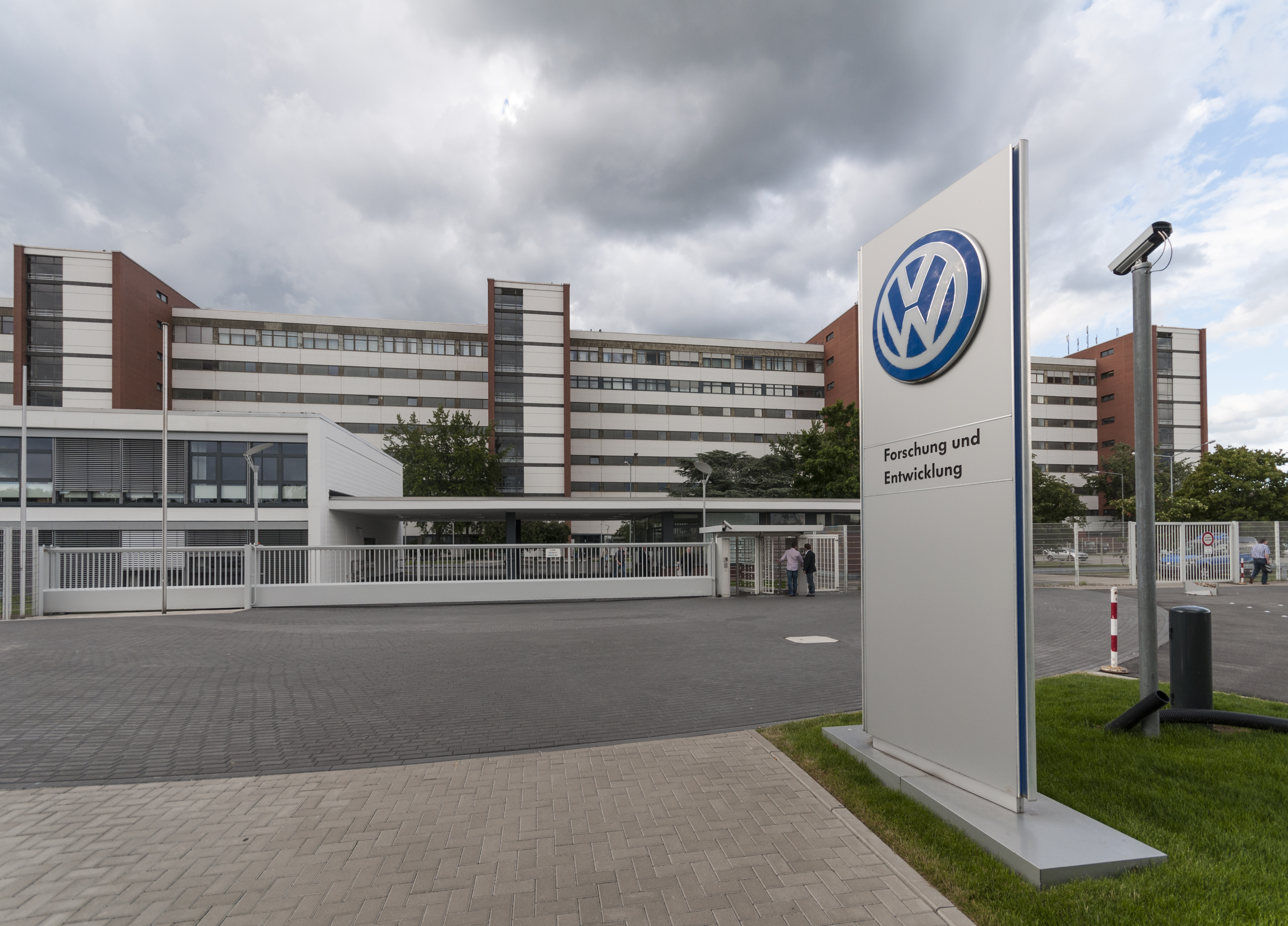
Volkswagen Research and Development building in Wolfsburg

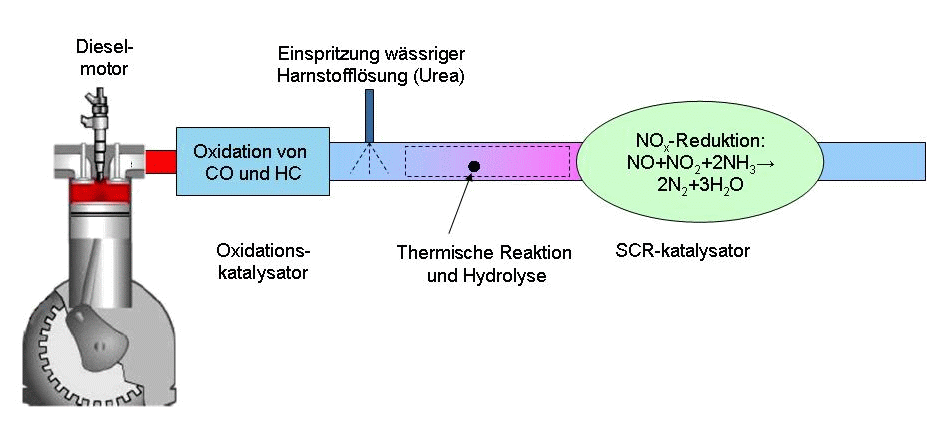
Graphic about selective catalytic reduction (SCR) system that uses Urea based Diesel exhaust fluid (DEF) known as BlueTec technology

=== Underlying U.S. and EU emission standards ===
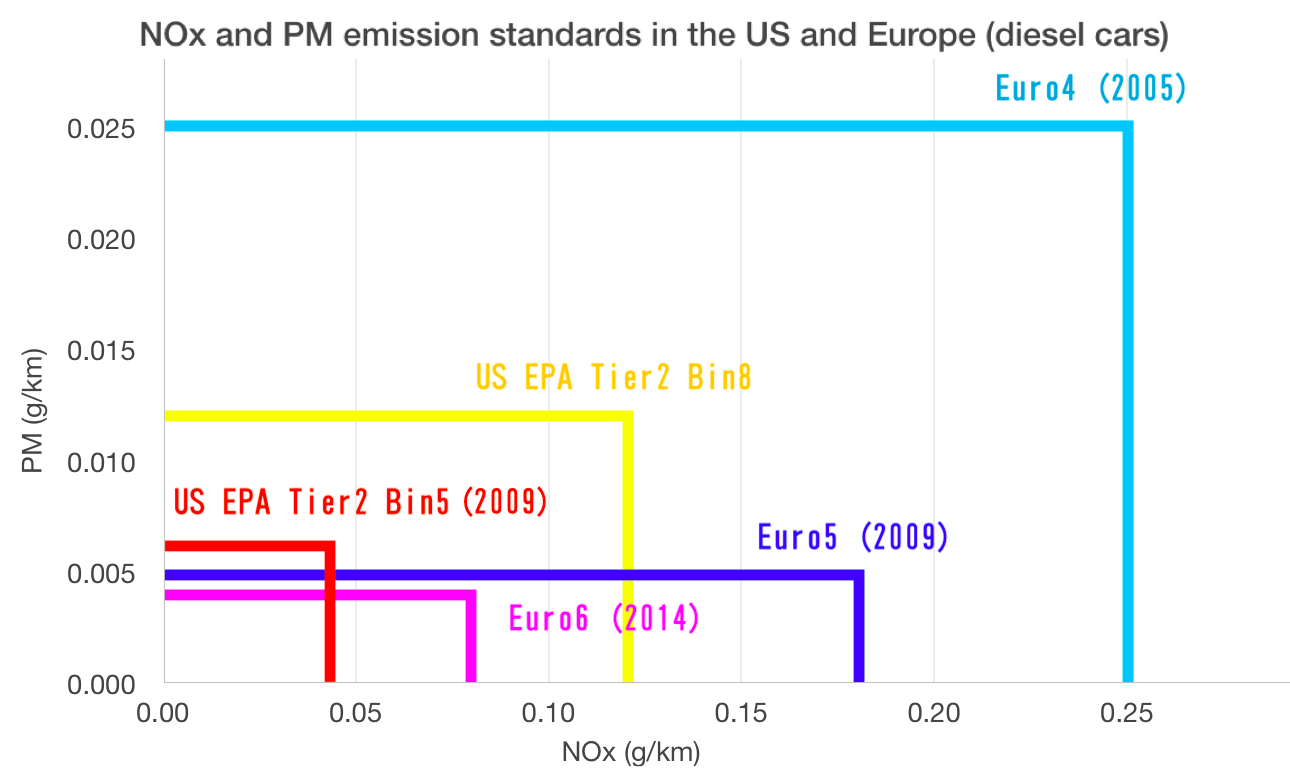
Comparison of NOx and PM emission standards in the US and Europe

The Volkswagen and Audi cars identified as violators had been certified to meet either the US EPA Tier 2 / Bin 5 emissions standard or the California LEV-II ULEV standard. Either standard requires that nitrogen oxide emissions not exceed 0.043 grams per kilometre (0.07 g/mi) for engines at full useful life which is defined as either 190,000 kilometres (120,000 mi) or 240,000 kilometres (150,000 mi) depending on the vehicle and optional certification choices.

This standard for nitrogen oxide emissions is among the most stringent in the world. For comparison, the contemporary European standards known as Euro 5 (2008 "EU5 compliant", 2009–2014 models) and Euro 6 (2015 models) only limit nitrogen oxide emissions to 0.18 grams per kilometre (0.29 g/mi) and 0.08 grams per kilometre (0.13 g/mi) respectively. Defeat devices are forbidden in the EU. The use of a defeat device is subject to a penalty.

Nature reported in 2015 that 20 percent of European city dwellers were exposed to unhealthy levels of nitrogen dioxide, and that in London, where diesel road traffic was responsible for 40 percent of NO_{x} emissions, 3,000 deaths per year could be attributed to air pollution. A Channel 4 documentary in January 2015 referred to the UK government moving to a CO_{2} emission band system for road tax, which favoured diesel power, as the "great car con", with Barry Gardiner MP, former member of the Blair government, stating that the policy, which lowered CO_{2} emissions yet increased NO_{x} pollution, was a mistake.

=== Early warnings 1998–2013 ===
In 1998, a Swedish researcher criticized the New European Driving Cycle standard for allowing large emission differences between test and reality. The Washington Post also reported that in the late 1990s, EPA engineers at Virginia Testing Laboratory had built a system called ROVER, designed to test a car's emissions on the road. The project was shut down in 2001, despite preliminary tests indicating gaps between emissions from lab tests and real world tests of about 10 to 20 percent.

In 2011, the European Commission's Joint Research Centre published a report which found the average on-road NO_{x} emission of all tested diesel vehicles to be 0.93 ± 0.39 g/km, and that of tested Euro 5 diesel vehicles to be 0.62 ± 0.19 g/km. Those numbers substantially exceeded the respective Euro 3–5 emission limit. In 2013, the research center then warned:

Sensors and electronic components in modern light-duty vehicles are capable of 'detecting' the start of an emissions test in the laboratory (e.g., based on acceleration sensors or not-driven/not-rotating wheels). Some vehicle functions may only be operational in the laboratory, if a predefined test mode is activated. Detecting emissions tests is problematic from the perspective of emissions legislation, because it may enable the use of defeat devices that activate, modulate, delay, or deactivate emissions control systems with the purpose of either enhancing the effectiveness of these systems during emissions testing or reducing the effectiveness of these systems under normal vehicle operation and use. While the use of defeat devices is generally prohibited, exceptions exist in cases where it is necessary to protect the engine against damage and to ensure safe vehicle operation (EC, 2007). These exceptions leave room for interpretation and provide scope, together with the currently applied test procedure, for tailoring the emissions performance [...].

The European Commission and European governments could not agree upon who was responsible for taking action. In the United Kingdom, the Department for Transport received a report from the International Council on Clean Transportation (ICCT) in October 2014, which stated there was a "real world nitrogen oxides compliance issue" with diesel passenger cars. The UK's DEFRA research indicated a significant reduction in NO_{x} and particulate matter from 1983 to 2014. Respirable suspended particles with a diameter of 10 micrometres – also known as PM_{10} (including diesel particulates) – halved since 1996 despite the increased number and size of diesel cars in the UK.

=== ICCT's emission testing, 2013–14 ===
In late 2012, the independent body International Council on Clean Transportation (ICCT) was seeking proposals from research facilities to study on-road emissions of so-called "clean diesel" cars sold in the US. Researchers at West Virginia University's Center for Alternative Fuels Engines and Emissions (WVU CAFEE) submitted a proposal to ICCT, and were awarded a US$70,000 grant for a study where they had to test US-spec diesel vehicles with two different emission reduction technologies: lean NO_{x} trap (LNT) and selective catalyst reduction (SCR). John German, co-lead of the US branch of ICCT, said the idea for this "very ordinary" test came from Peter Mock, managing director ICCT in Europe, and they chose to put US vehicles through on-the-road tests because their emissions regulations are more stringent than those in the European Union. The ICCT expected the cars to pass, and thought they would be able to use the results to demonstrate to Europeans that it was possible to run diesel cars with cleaner emissions.

In early 2013, researchers at WVU CAFEE began testing emissions from the three diesel cars: a Volkswagen Passat, a Volkswagen Jetta, and a BMW X5, on the road in California. They wanted to test a Mercedes as well, but could not obtain one. They used a portable emissions measurement system, making it possible to collect real world driving emissions data, for comparison with laboratory dynamometer testing. The three vehicles were all certified at a California Air Resources Board facility before the tests as falling below the emissions limits when using the standard laboratory testing protocols. They put 2,400 kilometres (1,500 mi) on the Jetta and X5. For their final test, they wanted to put even more mileage on the Passat and drove it from Los Angeles to Seattle and back again, virtually the entire West Coast of the United States, over 3,200 kilometres (2,000 mi). The BMW was "at or below the standard ... with exception of rural-up/downhill driving conditions". But the researchers found that under real-world driving conditions the Jetta exceeded US emissions limits "by a factor of 15 to 35" while the Passat exceeded the limit "by a factor of 5 to 20".

The emissions far exceeded legal limits set by both European and US standards. One of the testers said, "... we did so much testing that we couldn't repeatedly be doing the same mistake again and again." John German said the deceit required more effort than merely adding some code to the engine software, as the code would also have to be validated. The US test results confirmed the ICCT's findings in Europe. ICCT also purchased data from two other sources. The new road testing data and the purchased data were generated using Portable Emissions Measurement Systems (PEMS) developed by multiple individuals in the mid-late 1990s and published in May 2014. The West Virginia scientists did not identify the defeat device, but they reported their findings in a study they presented to the EPA and CARB in May 2014. In May 2014 Colorado's RapidScreen real-world emissions test data reinforced the suspected abnormally high emissions levels. After a year-long investigation, an international team of investigators identified the defeat device as a piece of code labelled "acoustic condition" which activated emissions-curbing systems when the car's computer identified it was undergoing a test.

NO_{x} numbers for Volkswagen Passat and Jetta (See note (Note: The vehicles tested were anonymous in the original WVU study. Emissions listed on page 64–65. NO_{x} treatment listed on page 9. U.S. and European NO_{x} limits listed on page 5 and 61.))
| Car | WVU measurement | | | European limits | | Comment |
| Car | U.S. limit | Dyno | On-road | Euro 5 | Euro 6 | Comment |
|---|---|---|---|---|---|---|
| Vehicle A Volkswagen Jetta 2.0 TDI | 0.043 g/km | 0.022 g/km | 0.61–1.5 g/km | 0.18 g/km (Note: In 2011, a study by the European Commission's Joint Research Centre found the average on-road NO_{x} emission of the tested Euro 5 diesel vehicles to be 0.62 ± 0.19 g/km.) | 0.08 g/km | Fitted with a lean-NO_{x} trap (LNT) emission treatment system. |
| Vehicle B Volkswagen Passat 2.0 TDI | 0.043 g/km | 0.016 g/km | 0.34–0.81 g/km | 0.18 g/km | 0.08 g/km | Fitted with the same engine as Vehicle A, but with a urea-based selective catalytic reduction (SCR) emission treatment system. |

VW NO_{x} emissions WVU

=== EPA Notice of Violation, 2015 ===
On 18 September 2015, the US Environmental Protection Agency served a Notice of Violation (NOV) of the Clean Air Act on Volkswagen Group alleging that Volkswagen and Audi automobiles equipped with 2-litre TDI diesel engines, and sold in the US between 2009 and 2015, had an emissions-compliance "defeat device" installed, and ordered a recall of 482,000 vehicles. A Notice of Violation is a notification to the recipient that the EPA believes it has committed violations and is not a final determination of liability.

Volkswagen's "defeat device" is specially-written engine-management-unit firmware that detects "the position of the steering wheel, vehicle speed, the duration of the engine's operation, and barometric pressure" when positioned on a dynamometer using the FTP-75 test schedule. These criteria very closely match the EPA's required emissions testing protocol which allowed the vehicle to comply with emissions regulations by properly activating all emissions control during testing. The EPA's NOV alleged that under normal driving conditions, the software suppressed the emissions controls, allowing better fuel economy, at the expense of emitting up to 40 times more nitrogen oxides than allowed by law.

=== Intelligence agencies, 2015 ===
In February 2017, Der Spiegel reported that in February 2015, former Israeli diplomat Avi Primor had shown Ferdinand Piëch, the Volkswagen chairman of the board at the time, a document in which US agencies warned CEO Martin Winterkorn early about the manipulation. During this meeting at the end of February 2015, Primor introduced Piëch to his friend Yuval Diskin, who after retiring from directing the Israeli secret service of the Interior Shin Bet, had founded a cybersecurity company. Shin Bet apparently knew about the scandal early. Primor confirmed that the meeting took place, but both Primor and Diskin denied tipping off Piech. In early March 2017, Piech asked Winterkorn whether there had been a warning by US agencies, which Winterkorn denied.

== Timeline ==
- 1999 - New US Tier 2 rules established to replace Tier 1. NO_{x} limit decreasing from 1.0 g/mi to 0.07 g/mi
- 2004–2009 - Phase-in period of diesel emissions rules
- 2007 - Volkswagen suspends sales of current diesel lines awaiting technology to meet new standards. Bosch allegedly warns Volkswagen not to use its software illegally.
- 2008 - Volkswagen announces new Clean Diesel cars. Some cars are described in Europe as "EU4 emissions standard (EU5 compliant)". Cars with the test-rigging software are sold in the UK.
- 2009 - US Tier 2 fully in effect,
  Volkswagen TDI cars go on sale in US. In Europe, some models are now being described as Euro emission class 5, a change from class 4 in 2008.
- 2009–2015 - Volkswagen diesel sales in the US rebound, Clean Diesels win several environmental awards, receive tax breaks
- 2013 - International Council on Clean Transportation asks WVU CAFEE to help demonstrate the benefits of US diesel technology, hoping to have Europe follow suit
- May 2014 - Instead, CAFEE finds discrepancies showing poor on-road emissions. Results presented at public forum and published, getting attention of EPA
- 2014–2015 - EPA repeats tests, and contacts Volkswagen for explanation of poor real world NO_{x} emissions
- Dec 2014 - Volkswagen orders voluntary recall of TDI cars but CARB and EPA not satisfied
- 3 September 2015 - EPA threatens to not certify 2016 diesels, Volkswagen responds by admitting software was programmed to cheat testing
- 18 September 2015 - Public announcement by EPA of order to recall 2009–2015 cars
- 20 September 2015 - Volkswagen admits deception, issues public apology
- 21 September 2015 - First business day after news, Volkswagen stock down 20 percent
- 22 September 2015 - Volkswagen to spend $7.3B to cover costs of scandal; stock declines another 17 percent
- 23 September 2015 - CEO Martin Winterkorn resigns
- 29 September 2015 - Volkswagen announces plans to refit up to 11 million vehicles affected by the emissions violations scandal
- 2 October 2015 - Volkswagen sets up an online based service on which customers can check if their car is affected based on the vehicle identification number
- 8 October 2015 - Volkswagen US CEO Michael Horn testifies before US Congress
- 3 November 2015 - Volkswagen's investigation finds that CO_{2} emissions and fuel consumption figures are also affected by "irregularities".
- 25 November 2015 - The German Federal Motor Transport Authority (KBA) approves Volkswagen fixes for 1.2, 1.6 and 2.0 diesel engines in Europe.
- 9 December 2015 - Volkswagen revises previous estimates on CO_{2} emissions irregularities, saying that only around 36,000 vehicles are affected.
- 9 March 2016 - Volkswagen US CEO Michael Horn resigns, citing a "mutual agreement" with the company.
- 21 April 2016 - Volkswagen announces that it will offer its US customers "substantial compensation" and car buyback offers for nearly 500,000 2.0-litre vehicles.
- 6 Nov 2016 - Regulators in California discover that Audi engines were rigged to produce lower CO_{2}.
- 7 January 2017 - FBI arrests emissions compliance manager Oliver Schmidt in a Florida airport restroom on a charge of conspiracy to defraud the United States.
- 11 January 2017 - Volkswagen agrees to plead guilty to the emissions scandal and to pay $4.3 billion in penalties. Six Volkswagen executives are charged.
- 3 May 2018 - Ex-CEO Winterkorn is indicted on fraud and conspiracy charges in the US
- 18 June 2018 - In connection with the case, Audi CEO Rupert Stadler is arrested in Germany.
- 16 October 2018 - Audi agrees to a fine of €800 million in Germany to resolve civil claims over duty to oversight (Verletzung der Aufsichtspflicht in Unternehmen)
- 14 March 2019 - US SEC alleges that Volkswagen AG, Martin Winterkorn, et al. defrauded investors and files suit in N.D. Cal.
- 15 April 2019 - Winterkorn and four other executives are charged by prosecutors in Braunschweig, Germany.
- 31 July 2019 - Stadler and three others are charged by prosecutors in Munich, Germany.
- 24 September 2019 - Pötsch, Diess, and Winterkorn are charged with stock market manipulation by prosecutors in Germany.
- 14 January 2020 - Six additional individuals are charged by prosecutors in Braunschweig, Germany.

== Volkswagen's response ==
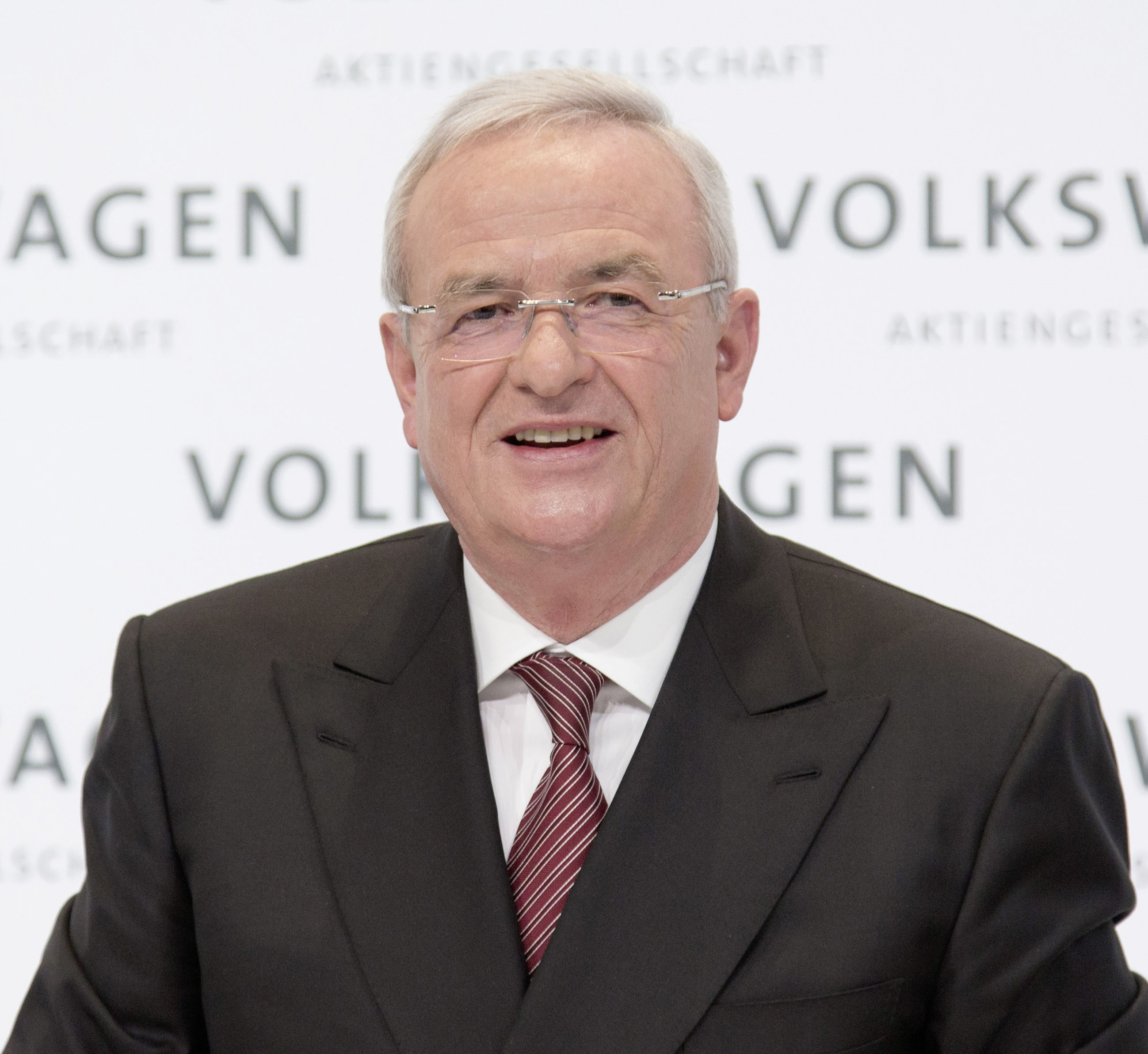
Former Volkswagen AG CEO Martin Winterkorn in March 2015

According to the EPA, Volkswagen had insisted for a year before the outbreak of the scandal that discrepancies were mere technical glitches. Volkswagen fully acknowledged that they had manipulated the vehicle emission tests only after being confronted with evidence regarding the "defeat device".

The first sign that Volkswagen was ready to come clean reportedly occurred on 21 August 2015 at a conference on green transportation in Pacific Grove, California, where an unnamed company representative approached Christopher Grundler, director of the EPA Office of Transportation and Air Quality, and surprised him by informally admitting that the company had been deceiving regulators. A CARB official was standing next to Grundler at the time.

Formal acknowledgement of the deception was made by Volkswagen executives in Germany and the United States to EPA and California officials during a 3 September conference call, during which Volkswagen executives discussed written materials provided to the participants demonstrating how Volkswagen's diesel engine software circumvented US emissions tests. That admission came after the EPA threatened to withhold approval for the company's 2016 Volkswagen and Audi diesel models.

I am shocked by the events of the past few days. I am stunned that misconduct on such a scale was possible in the Volkswagen Group. As CEO I accept responsibility for the irregularities. I am doing this in the interests of the company even though I am not aware of any wrongdoing on my part.

— Martin Winterkorn, Former Volkswagen CEO Martin Winterkorn resignation statement, 23 September 2015.

Volkswagen's CEO Martin Winterkorn said: "I personally am deeply sorry that we have broken the trust of our customers and the public." Winterkorn was in charge at Volkswagen from the start of 2008 to September 2015. He attributed the admitted wrongdoing to "the terrible mistakes of a few people". Winterkorn initially resisted calls to step down from his leadership role at VW, but then resigned as CEO on 23 September 2015.

Volkswagen Group of America CEO Michael Horn was more direct, saying, "We've totally screwed up." Horn added, "Our company was dishonest with the EPA, and the California Air Resources Board and with all of you." Olaf Lies, a Volkswagen board member and economy minister of Lower Saxony, later told the BBC that the people "who allowed this to happen, or who made the decision to install this software" acted criminally, and must be held personally accountable. He also said the board found out about the problems only "shortly before the media did", and expressed concerns over "why the board wasn't informed earlier about the problems when they were known about over a year ago in the United States".

Volkswagen announced that 11 million cars were involved in the falsified emission reports, and that over seven billion dollars would be earmarked to deal with the costs of rectifying the software at the heart of the pollution statements. The newly appointed CEO of Volkswagen Mathias Müller stated that the software was activated in only a part of those 11 million cars, which has yet to be determined. The German tabloid Bild claimed that top management had been aware of the software's use to manipulate exhaust settings as early as 2007. Bosch provided the software for testing purposes and warned Volkswagen that it would be illegal to use the software to avoid emissions compliance during normal driving. Der Spiegel followed Bild with an article dated 30 September 2015 to state that some groups of people were aware of this in 2005 or 2006. Süddeutsche Zeitung had similarly reported that Heinz-Jakob Neusser, one of Volkswagen's top executives, had ignored at least one engineer's warnings over "possibly illegal" practices in 2011.

On 28 September 2015, it was reported that Volkswagen had suspended Heinz-Jakob Neusser, head of brand development at its core Volkswagen brand, Ulrich Hackenberg, the head of research and development at its brand Audi who oversees technical development across the Volkswagen group, and Wolfgang Hatz, research and development chief at its sports-car brand Porsche who also heads engine and transmissions development of the Volkswagen group. On the same day it was reported that besides the internal investigation of the incidents, the supervisory board of Volkswagen had hired American law firm Jones Day to carry out an independent investigation. Computerworld suggested that a software audit trail and test logs were ways to investigate what took place when. In February 2016 Volkswagen also contracted three public relations firms (Kekst in the United States, Hering Schuppener in Germany, Finsbury in Britain), in addition to its usual US-retained firm Edelman. To further help deal with the scandal, Volkswagen hired ex-FBI director Louis Freeh, alongside former German constitutional judge Christine Hohmann-Dennhardt previously employed by Daimler, and as of 2016 on Volkswagen's board as its director of integrity and legal affairs.

=== Other irregularities, November 2015 ===
==== CO_{2} emissions ====
On 3 November 2015, Volkswagen revealed that its internal investigation found that CO_{2} emissions and fuel consumption figures were also affected by "irregularities". These new issues, first estimated to cost up to €2 billion to repair, involved mainly diesel, but also some petrol models, with initial estimates suggesting that approximately 800,000 vehicles equipped with 1.4, 1.6 and 2.0 litre motors from VW, Skoda, Audi and SEAT might be affected. On 9 December 2015, Volkswagen revised these estimates, saying that only around 36,000 vehicles are affected by the irregularities, while also affirming that it had found no evidence of unlawful changing of CO_{2} emissions data. The news prompted a 7.3 percent increase in Volkswagen preference shares on the same day.

In November 2016, California regulators claimed to have discovered software installed on some Audi models that allowed the manufacturer to cheat CO_{2} emissions during standard testing, thereby also masking the cars' contribution to global warming.

==== 3.0 litre TDI emissions ====
On 20 November 2015, the EPA said Volkswagen officials told the agency that all 3.0-litre TDI diesel engines sold in the US from 2009 through 2015 were also fitted with emissions-cheating software, in the form of "alternate exhaust control devices". These are prohibited in the United States; however, the software is legal in Europe. Volkswagen acknowledges these devices' existence, but maintains that they were not installed with a "forbidden purpose". On 4 January 2016, the US Department of Justice filed a complaint in a federal court against VW, alleging that the respective 3.0-litre diesel engines meet the legal emission requirements in only a "temperature conditioning" mode that is automatically switched on during testing conditions, while at "all other times, including during normal vehicle operation, the vehicles operate in a 'normal mode' that permits NO_{x} emissions of up to nine times the federal standard". The complaint covers around 85,000 3.0 litre diesel vehicles sold in the United States since 2009, including the Volkswagen Touareg, Porsche Cayenne, Audi A6 Quattro, Audi A7 Quattro, Audi A8, Audi A8L, Audi Q5, and Audi Q7 models.

=== Affected Volkswagen and Audi TDI models ===
List of affected vehicles and generation of engine
| Brand | Model | Model Years | Generation of Engine |
|---|---|---|---|
| Audi | A1 | 2010–2014 | 1 |
| Audi | A3 | 2009–2013 | 1 |
| Volkswagen | Beetle | 2013–2014 | 1 |
| Volkswagen | Beetle Convertible | 2013–2014 | 1 |
| Volkswagen | Golf 2-Door | 2010–2013 | 1 |
| Volkswagen | Golf 4-Door | 2010–2014 | 1 |
| Volkswagen | Jetta | 2009–2014 | 1 |
| Volkswagen | Jetta SportWagen | 2009–2014 | 1 |
| Volkswagen | Passat | 2012–2015 | 1 |
| Audi | A3 | 2015 | 3 (Initial Modification) |
| Volkswagen | Beetle | 2015 | 3 (Initial Modification) |
| Volkswagen | Beetle Convertible | 2015 | 3 (Initial Modification) |
| Volkswagen | Golf 4-Door | 2015 | 3 (Initial Modification) |
| Volkswagen | Golf SportWagen | 2015 | 3 (Initial Modification) |
| Volkswagen | Jetta | 2015 | 3 (Initial Modification) |
| Volkswagen | Passat | 2015 | 3 (Initial Modification) |
| Audi | A3 | 2015 | 3 (Subsequent Modification) |
| Volkswagen | Beetle | 2015 | 3 (Subsequent Modification) |
| Volkswagen | Beetle Convertible | 2015 | 3 (Subsequent Modification) |
| Volkswagen | Golf 4-Door | 2015 | 3 (Subsequent Modification) |
| Volkswagen | Golf SportWagen | 2015 | 3 (Subsequent Modification) |
| Volkswagen | Jetta | 2015 | 3 (Subsequent Modification) |
| Volkswagen | Passat | 2015 | 3 (Subsequent Modification) |
| Volkswagen | Touareg | 2009–2012 | 3 |
| Audi | Q7 | 2009–2015 | 3 |
| Volkswagen | Touareg | 2013–2016 | 3 |
| Audi | A6 | 2014–2016 | 3 |
| Audi | A7 | 2014–2016 | 3 |
| Audi | A8 | 2014–2016 | 3 |
| Audi | A8L | 2014–2016 | 3 |
| Audi | Q5 | 2014–2016 | 3 |
| Audi | Q7 | 2013–2015 | 3 |

=== Vehicle recall and consequences ===
On 29 September 2015, Volkswagen announced plans to refit up to 11 million affected vehicles, fitted with Volkswagen's EA 189 diesel engines, including 5 million at Volkswagen brand, 2.1 million at Audi, 1.2 million at Škoda and 1.8 million light commercial vehicles. SEAT said that 700,000 of its diesel models were affected. In Europe alone, a total of 8 million vehicles are affected. In Germany, 2.8 million vehicles will have to be recalled, followed by the UK, with 1.2 million. In France, 984,064 vehicles were affected, in Austria around 360,000, while in the Czech Republic 148,000 vehicles were involved (of which 101,000 were Škodas). In Portugal, Volkswagen said it had sold 94,400 vehicles with the software. The repair may not require a formal recall; in the UK, for example, the company will simply offer to repair the cars free of charge; a recall is required only "when a defect is identified that... could result in serious injury". As the rules violation involved enabling emission controls during testing, but turning it off under normal conditions to improve performance or fuel mileage, it has been speculated that the software update might make cars perform less efficiently and impair fuel economy; according to VW, however, its proposed solutions will be designed to achieve legal EU emissions compliance without impairing engine performance or consumption.

As of September 2015 it was unclear whether the repair would include hardware modifications, such as selective catalytic reduction (SCR) upgrades. The recall was scheduled to start in January 2016, with all affected cars projected to be fixed by the end of the year. The company also announced a review of all of its brands and models, including its supercar marque Bugatti.

On 8 October 2015, Volkswagen US CEO Michael Horn said in testimony before the US Congress that it could take years to repair all the cars, especially the older models, due to the required complex hardware and software changes. He said that the fixes would likely preserve fuel economy ratings but, "there might be a slight impact on performance".

On 12 October 2015, Paul Willis, Volkswagen UK managing director, told the Commons Transport Select Committee that about 400,000 Volkswagen cars in the UK will need fuel injectors altered as well as a software fix. The vehicles requiring the hardware fix are the 1.6 litre diesel models. The 1.2 litre and 2.0 litre diesel models will require only a software fix. On the same day, Volkswagen announced it would overhaul its entire diesel strategy, saying that in Europe and North America it will switch "as soon as possible" to the use of selective catalytic reduction technology to improve diesel emissions. It also announced plans to accelerate the development of electric cars and plug-in hybrids, as well as petrol, instead of diesel engines for smaller cars.

On 12–13 October 2015, Volkswagen Group vehicle drivers in the UK started receiving notification letters, to "rectify the issue". Volkswagen later announced a timeline for UK diesel recalls, citing March 2016 for 2.0-litre engines, June 2016 for 1.2-litre engines, and October 2016 for 1.6-litre engines.

At the beginning of October 2015, Volkswagen suggested to let car owners decide whether to take their cars for rectification. However, the German Federal Motor Transport Authority (Kraftfahrt-Bundesamt, or KBA) views the software as illegal, and has ordered a full recall of all affected cars in Germany. Volkswagen then decided to recall around 8.5 million cars in Europe, about a third of all its car deliveries since 2009. KBA requires Volkswagen to send a recall plan to KBA before the end of October for 2.0-litre cars, and end of November for 1.2 and 1.6-litre cars. If KBA approves a plan, Volkswagen can then start handling the cars. The German authorities require that Volkswagen remove the software and that Volkswagen ensures that emission rules are fulfilled. Media estimates that the KBA procedure sets a precedent for how authorities in other countries handle the case.

On 18 November 2015, Autoblog reported that the KBA was reviewing a Volkswagen fix for the affected 1.6 diesel engine. On 25 November 2015, Volkswagen said the fix involved a minor hardware modification to the car's air intake system, alongside a software update. This low-cost solution contradicted earlier speculation regarding the possible fitting of new injection nozzles and catalytic converters. In December 2015, Volkswagen said that the affected 1.2-litre and 2.0-litre diesel engines needed only a software update. As of November 2015, the KBA had approved the fixes with the first recalls likely to begin in January 2016. According to VW, the measures aimed to achieve legal EU emissions compliance without impairing engine output, fuel consumption, or performance. The simple fixes with inexpensive parts and software were then possible though not available when the engines were developed, because engine technology understanding and intake flow simulation capabilities had matured in the meantime, to address the burning of diesel and air mixtures via intake flow shaping. As of December 2015, due to stricter environmental legislation, fixes for US vehicles were expected to take longer to produce and be more technically complex.

As of February 2016, there were three sizes of affected diesel engines, and more than a dozen variations to the repairs exist, prompting Volkswagen to roll out the recalls in waves for each cluster of vehicle; the first model to be repaired was the low-volume Volkswagen Amarok. Classified as a light commercial vehicle, the Amarok pickup has a higher Euro 5 NO_{x} emissions limit than the passenger cars that are yet to have an available approved fix. German motoring journal Auto Motor und Sport tested two Amarok TDI pickups pre and post software update and found that whilst engine power had remained the same, fuel consumption had increased by 0.5 litres/100 km. This is believed in turn to have delayed the next wave of updates to the larger volume Passat model which had been expected to start on 29 February 2016 due to the further testing of the update by the KBA. Volkswagen confirmed on 11 April 2016 that the Passat recall would be delayed as testing had revealed higher fuel consumption. In 2017 Swedish auto journal Teknikens Värld performed tests on 10 different models and most of them showed a reduction in power output and increase in fuel consumption after having the update applied.

=== Advertising, 2015 ===
In France, the MediaCom media agency, which buys advertising for Volkswagen, warned the French newspapers on 22 September 2015 that it would cancel planned Volkswagen and Audi campaigns in case they would cover the emission violations. Given the scale that the scandal had already taken by that time, the threat had little effect on its coverage.

On the occasion of German Unity Day, Volkswagen launched an ad campaign in German Sunday newspapers, that it wanted to express its joy about the 25th anniversary of German reunification, its pride about having shaped the country together with all people for the last 25 years, to give thanks for the confidence of the customers it had experienced during all this time and that it wanted to thank all its employees and trade partners in Germany, and that in one sentence, that "it would do everything to win back the confidence of its customers".

=== New orders, September 2015 ===
In September 2015, Volkswagen's Belgian importer, D'Ieteren, announced that it would offer free engine upgrades to 800 customers who had ordered a vehicle with a diesel engine which was likely to have been fitted with illegal software.

As of October 2015, Sales of vehicles with EA 189 engines were halted in some European countries, including Spain, Switzerland, Italy, the Netherlands, Belgium and the UK.

In the United States, Volkswagen withdrew its application for emissions certification for its 2016 diesel models, leaving thousands of vehicles stranded at ports in October 2015, which the company said contained software which should have been disclosed to and certified by the EPA. EPA quarantined some 2016-models until it would become clear that their catalysts perform the same on the road as they do in tests.

=== US Congressional Testimony, October 2015 ===
External videos
- Emissions Investigation Hearing, C-SPAN, 8 October 2015

On 8 October 2015, Volkswagen US CEO Michael Horn testified before the United States House Committee on Energy and Commerce stating: "This was not a corporate decision, from my point of view, and to my best knowledge today. This was a couple of software engineers who put this in for whatever reason... some people have made the wrong decisions in order to get away with something that will have to be found out." The response was widely ridiculed.

=== Compensation, November 2015 ===
On 9 November 2015, Volkswagen announced that, in addition to the US$2,000 it was offering current Volkswagen owners for trade-ins, 482,000 diesel Audi and Volkswagen owners in the United States would be eligible to receive US$1,000 in vouchers. On 18 November 2015, Volkswagen said that approximately one quarter of the affected vehicle owners had applied to the program, which was estimated to cost at least $120 million in benefits. Volkswagen confirmed that it is offering vouchers including to customers in Canada. Volkswagen America said that accepting the gift cards does not prevent owners from filing lawsuits. Volkswagen also created a claims fund that was managed by internal Volkswagen teams in conjunction with a third party claims administrator, following successful negotiations between Volkswagen, EPA, DOJ, FTC and the consumer class action attorneys. In addition an alternative claims fund was considered as a mechanism to encourage the class action settlement, to be managed by the well-known mediation attorney Kenneth Feinberg, but ultimately was not used. The claims fund offered full compensation packages (in the form of cash, buy-backs, repairs or replacement cars) to the approximately 600,000 United States owners affected by the scandal. Despite earlier hints to the contrary, in December 2015 Volkswagen CEO Matthias Müller said that customers outside the US and Canada should also expect some type of compensation package: "we are working on an attractive package, let's call it compensation, for reduction in residual values in our cars". However, on 11 January 2016, a Volkswagen spokesman said "there won't be compensation. All the indications are that residual values are unaffected"; the company, which continued to face pressure from E.U. officials to compensate European drivers as well, blamed the confusion on "a slight mistranslation". E.U. commissioner Elżbieta Bieńkowska said Volkswagen was treating European consumers unfairly, and Volkswagen responded that the situation in US and Canadian markets, where confidence in diesel technology was "severely shaken" and clients needed to wait longer for an engine fix due to tougher emissions standards, was not "automatically comparable" with other markets.

On 21 April 2016, the federal district court for the Northern District of California, which was appointed in December 2015 to oversee almost all of the US litigation, including claims filed by vehicle owners and state governments, announced that Volkswagen would offer its US customers "substantial compensation" and buy back nearly 500,000 2.0-litre vehicles as part of a settlement in North America. The court appointed former FBI Director Robert Mueller as a mediator to oversee the negotiations between claimants, regulators, and Volkswagen, to produce a final "consent decree" by late June 2016. The court also appointed attorney Christopher A. Seeger of Seeger Weiss LLP to serve on the Plaintiffs’ Steering Committee.

=== European actions, 2015–2020 ===
Following its admission and recall plans in the United States, Volkswagen also started to establish similar plans in the European Union, where it was estimated that 8.5 million of the 11 million diesel vehicles affected by the scandal were located. The European Union warned Volkswagen in 2018 that it did not believe it was moving fast enough to issue repairs on the recalled cars, provide consumers with appropriate information on what steps Volkswagen was doing to resolve the problem, and what compensation they were offering affected consumers. Volkswagen agreed to a €1 billion fine imposed by Germany for failing to monitor the employees that modified the software behind the scandal in 2018.

In Germany, over 60,000 civil lawsuits of various degrees representing about 450,000 citizens were filed from 2015 through 2019 by Volkswagen owners, seeking similar compensation as Volkswagen had given to United States drivers. A case led by the Federation of German Consumer Organizations (VZBV) was brought against Volkswagen. At the Braunschweig Oberlandesgericht (Higher Regional Court) Volkswagen argued that where the United States had banned the affected cars, no EU member state had banned the affected vehicle, and thus there was no basis for any compensation. However, Judge Michael Neef rejected a summary judgement for Volkswagen in September 2019, allowing what was anticipated to be a multi-year case to go forward. Volkswagen had settled with VZBV for about €830 million – providing between €1,350 and €6,257 to approximately 260,000 Volkswagen owners through the VZBV – in February 2020. Many consumers were angered over this settlement, representing only a fraction of what Volkswagen had paid to United States' owners. One of the other civil cases, serving as a template for those not covered by the VZBV case, reached the Federal Court of Justice, Germany's highest court, and in May 2020 it ruled that the consumer was entitled to the full market value of the car, several times larger than what the settlement would have offered. It is unclear how much Volkswagen will owe from a result of the remaining civil lawsuits.

A similar class-action suit against Volkswagen representing more than 91,000 owners is currently underway in the United Kingdom, seeking greater compensation for being sold vehicles known by Volkswagen to be defective. The High Court of Justice had giving preliminary findings in the case in April 2020 that there is a likelihood that Volkswagen did sell vehicles with a "defeat device" and attempted to abuse the process, allowing the trial to go forward.

== Consequences ==
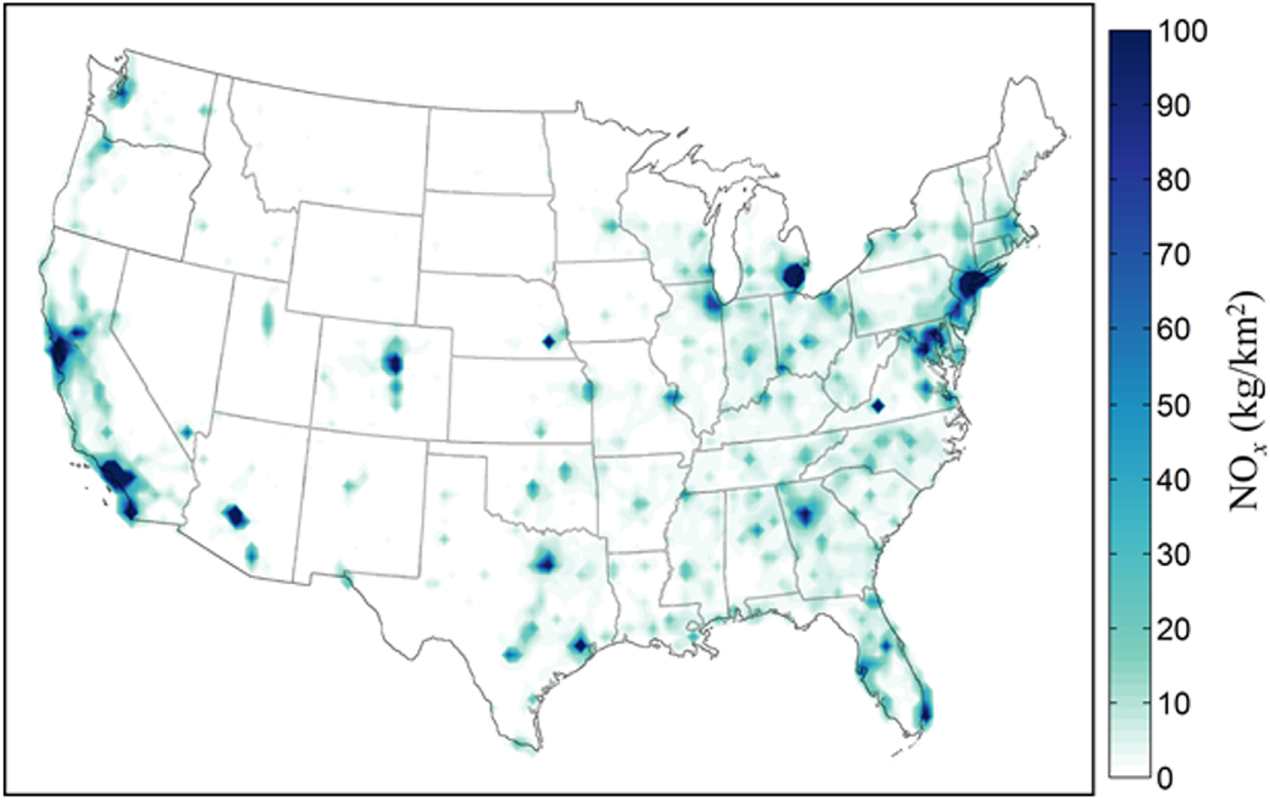
Distribution of estimated actual excess Volkswagen light duty diesel vehicle NO_{x} emissions summed over 2008 through 2015 (kg per km^{2}). The median value of emissions is used for each year. Emission density peaks at 446 kg per km^{2}.

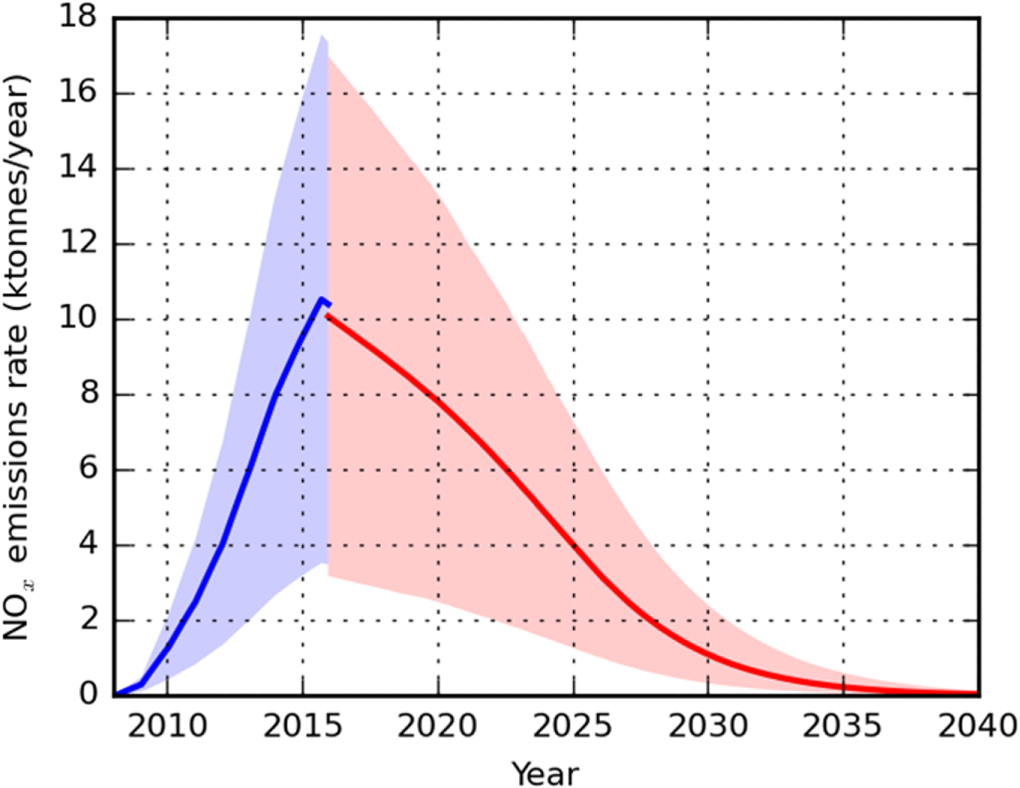
Annual excess Volkswagen light duty diesel vehicle NO_{x} emissions in kilotonnes (million kg). Results from 2008 through 2015 (blue) are estimates of actual excess emissions. Results from 2016 onward (red) are forecast based on the existing in-use vehicle fleet assuming no new sales of non-compliant vehicles from September 2015 and no retrofitting (used to calculate the benefit of a return to compliance). The shaded region indicates the 95 percent confidence interval. The discontinuity is due to the difference in the baseline for past (based on FTP-75 drive cycle measurements) and future (based on a return to regulatory limit) emissions.

=== Health consequences ===
==== Deaths ====
A peer-reviewed study published in Environmental Research Letters estimated that approximately 59 premature deaths would be caused by the excess pollution produced between 2008 and 2015 by vehicles equipped with the defeat device in the United States, the majority due to particulate pollution (87 percent) with the remainder due to ozone (13 percent). The study also found that making these vehicles emissions compliant by the end of 2016 would avert an additional 130 early deaths.

Earlier non peer-reviewed studies published in media sources, quoted estimates ranging from 10 to 350 excess deaths in the United States related to the defeat devices based on varying assumptions.

A 2022 study by economists found that each cheating Volkswagen car per 1,000 cars caused a low birth weight rate increase of 1.9 percent and infant mortality rate increase by 1.7 percent.

A 2025 study by the Centre for Research on Energy and Clean Air found that, beyond exclusively Volkswagen vehicles, excess emissions emitted by diesel vehicles are estimated to have caused 124,000 (between 75,000–216,000) premature deaths over the period of 2009 to 2024 across the EU and UK, and if no further action is taken, a projected 81,000 (between 48,000–140,000) premature deaths from 2025 to 2040.

==== Non-fatal health impacts ====
Since NO_{2} is a precursor to ground-level ozone it may cause respiratory problems "including asthma, bronchitis and emphysema". Nitrogen oxides amplify the effect of fine particulate matter soot which causes heart problems, a form of air pollution estimated to kill 50,000 in the United States annually.

A peer-reviewed study published in Environmental Pollution estimated that the fraudulent emissions would be associated with 45,000 disability-adjusted life years (DALYs) and a value of life lost of at least 39 billion US dollars.

In June 2016, Axel Friedrich, formerly with the German equivalent of the E.P.A. and a co-founder of the International Council on Clean Transportation stated "It's not just fraud – it's physical assault."

=== Environmental consequences ===
NO_{x} also contributes to acid rain, and visibly brown clouds or smog due to both the visible nature of NO_{2} and the ground level ozone created by NO. NO and NO_{2} are not greenhouse gases, whereas N_{2}O is a greenhouse gas. NO_{2} is a precursor to ground-level ozone. In regions such as Europe, stricter laws and regulations took longer to be implemented; as a result, it temporarily allowed vehicles to emit more NO_{x} into the air until the Euro 6 standards were phased in.

=== Legal and financial repercussions ===
==== Government actions ====
===== Australia =====
In October 2015, the Australian Competition & Consumer Commission announced that it would not be investigating Volkswagen for possible violations of emissions standards, citing that a reasonable consumer would not be concerned about the tailpipe emissions of their vehicle and hence would not be a deciding factor in their purchase. In March 2017, the Sydney Morning Herald reported that Audi and Volkswagen issued a voluntary recall for affected cars for software updates and in some cases hardware updates had begun in December 2016. As of January 2018, several class action suits were dropped against Volkswagen, Audi and Skoda.

In December 2019, Volkswagen was fined A$125,000,000 for making false and misleading representations about compliance with Australian diesel emissions standards.

===== Belgium =====
In October 2015, the Belgian Chamber of Representatives set up a special Dieselgate committee. It finalized a consensus report in March 2016, for the government to implement recommendations, with near-unanimous approval on 28 April 2016.

In January 2016, public broadcaster VRT reported on Opel Zafira cars having lower emissions after an update compared to before receiving the update. Opel denied deploying software updates influencing emissions, and the Economic Inspection of the Federal Government started an investigation on the request of Minister of Consumer Protection Kris Peeters.

===== Brazil =====
As of October 2015, Volkswagen Brazil confirmed that 17,057 units of its Amarok mid-size pickups produced between 2011 and 2012 and sold in Brazil were equipped with the emissions cheating software. The Brazilian Institute for the Environment and Renewable Natural Resources (Ibama) launched an investigation, warning that Volkswagen could face fines up to R$50,000,000.

In September 2017, Volkswagen Brazil was ordered to pay R$1,000,000,000 to the 17,000 owners of the Amarok pickups equipped with defeat devices, as decided by the 1st Business Court of the Court of Justice of Rio de Janeiro. The automaker may still appeal the decision. The total amount reaches R$1,092,648,000 (US$348 million at the September 2017 exchange rate) and each consumer will receive R$54,000 (US$17,000) for material damages and another R$10,000 (US$3,000) for moral damages. In addition, the magistrate ordered the automaker to pay an additional R$1,000,000 into the National Consumer Protection Fund. According to the judge, the purpose was "to compensate the Brazilian society as a collective moral damage of a pedagogical and punitive nature because of the collective fraud caused in the domestic motor vehicle market".

===== Canada =====
In September 2015, Environment Canada announced that it had begun an investigation to determine if "defeat devices" were installed in Volkswagen vehicles to bypass emission control tests in Canada. On 15 December 2016 an agreement was reached which allowed buybacks or trade-ins based on market value on 18 September 2015 or fitting an approved emissions modification. All three options also added a cash payment between CA$5,100 and CA$8,000.

Ontario provincial authorities executed a search warrant at Volkswagen Canada offices in the Toronto area on 19 September 2017 as part of its investigation into the emissions scandal that rocked the company two years previously. The Ministry of the Environment and Climate Change have charged Volkswagen AG with one count under the province's Environmental Protection Act, alleging the German company did not comply with Ontario emission standards. The allegations have not been proven in court.

In July 2018, Volkswagen Group Canada announced plans for its new Electrify Canada subsidiary to launch a network of public fast-charging stations in major cities and along major highways, starting with 32 charging sites in the four most-populated provinces: Ontario, Quebec, British Columbia and Alberta.

On 9 December 2019, Volkswagen AG was charged with 60 counts of contravening the Canadian Environmental Protection Act, 1999. On 22 January 2020, Volkswagen pleaded guilty to all charges and was fined CA$196.5 million.

===== China =====
In October 2015, China's General Administration of Quality Supervision, Inspection and Quarantine announced the recall of 1,946 imported Tiguan SUVs and four imported Passat B6 sedans, in order to fix the emissions software problems.

===== European Union =====
In September 2015, Government regulatory agencies and investigators initiated proceedings in France, Italy, Germany, Switzerland, Spain, the Netherlands, the Czech Republic and Romania. Several countries called for a Europe-wide investigation. In October 2015 Werner Hoyer, President of the European Investment Bank (EIB) said the bank was considering recalling Volkswagen loans, and announced their own investigation into the matter. On 27 October 2015, the European Parliament voted a resolution urging the bloc to establish a federal authority to oversee car-emissions, following reports in the press that top EU environmental officials had warned, since early 2013, that manufacturers are tweaking vehicles to perform better in the lab than on the road. The resolution urged for tougher emissions tests to be fully implemented in 2017, instead of being phased in between 2017 and 2019, as had been originally planned. However, the European Commission proceeded with passing legislation that allowed the car industry an extra year before having to comply with the newer regulation. Also, the new "realistic" EU driving emissions test would continue to allow cars to emit more than twice the legal limit of nitrogen oxides (NO_{x}) from 2019 and up to 50 percent more from 2021. The legislation, opposed only by the Netherlands, was a victory for the car industry's lobbying against stricter emissions regulations, and drew stern critique from some MEPs. Dutch MEP Bas Eickhout referred to the new test as "a sham", while liberal democrat MEP Catherine Bearder described the legislation as "a disgraceful stitch-up by national governments, who are once again putting the interests of carmakers ahead of public health". In December 2015, the EU Parliament voted to establish a special of inquiry committee to investigate whether regulators and executive officials, including the European Commission, failed to oversee the car industry and its pollution testing regimes.

In June 2016, documents leaked to the press indicated that in 2010, European Commission officials had been warned by their in-house science team that at least one car manufacturer was possibly using a NO_{x}-related defeat device in order to bypass emission regulation. Kathleen Van Brempt, the chair of the EU inquiry into the scandal, found the documents "shocking" and suggested that they raised serious concerns with regard to the future of commission officials: "These documents show that there has been an astonishing collective blindness to the defeat device issue in the European commission, as well as in other EU institutions".

In September 2020, European union laws changed and the European commission has the right to check car conformity to emission standards and to recall vehicles when needed. Fines can be up to €30,000 per car.

===== France =====
Renault and Peugeot's headquarters were raided by fraud investigators in January and April 2016, respectively. As of January 2016, Renault recalled 15,000 cars for emission testing and fixing. French authorities opened an inquiry in March 2016 into Volkswagen over the rigging of emission tests, with prosecutors investigating suspicions of "aggravated deception".

===== Germany =====
In September 2015 former Volkswagen chief executive Martin Winterkorn resigned over the scandal, saying he had no knowledge of the manipulation of emissions results. One week later German prosecutors launched an investigation against him. On 1 October a German prosecutor clarified, it was looking into allegations of fraud from unidentified individuals, but that Winterkorn was not under formal investigation. On 8 October 2015 police raided Volkswagen headquarters. As of 16 October 2015, twenty investigators worked on the case, targeting "more than two, but a lot fewer than 10" Volkswagen staff. As of November 2015 the Kraftfahrt-Bundesamt KBA tested 50 cars from different manufacturers, both in laboratory and on-road with PEMS. In May 2016, German transport minister Alexander Dobrindt said that Volkswagen, Audi, Mercedes-Benz, Opel and Porsche would all adjust settings that increased emission levels such as nitrogen dioxide in some diesel cars. On 16 March 2017, German authorities raided the headquarters of Audi in Bavaria and Volkswagen in Wolfsburg.

On 15 April 2019 Winterkorn and four other executives were charged by prosecutors in Braunschweig, Germany. The four were sentenced in May 2025, to over 4 years prison, over 2 years prison, and over 1 year probation. Winterkorn's case is suspended for health reasons.

In August 2019, a district court ruled that updated software didn't properly address the emissions, citing a tested Tiguan turbodiesel engine that only reduced emissions in the ambient temperature range of 10–32 °C (50–90 °F).

Audi's then CEO Rupert Stadler was taken into German custody in June 2018 until being released in October 2018, when he was also removed from being CEO. In July 2019, Stadler was charged with fraud in Munich due to the scandal.

===== Hong Kong =====
The Hong Kong Environmental Protection Department banned the Volkswagen Caddy on 16 October 2015. As of 16 October 2015 the department had also tested the Amarok and Transporter commercial diesel vehicles but found them to be free of the defeat device.

===== India =====
On 25 September 2015, the Indian government directed the Automotive Research Association of India (ARAI) to investigate whether Volkswagen's vehicles had circumvented Indian laws and regulations on vehicle emission testing. On 22 September 2015 the Indian Foundation of Transport, Research and Training (IFTRT) demanded a probe into Volkswagen's Confirmation of Production process for vehicles sold in India. In October the Government of India later extended its deadline for the test results to the end of October 2015. On 11 January 2017, ARAI's investigation into defeat devices was published and revealed that Volkswagen India had installed a derivation of the software used in the rest of the world and to defeat emission testing procedures in all of the Volkswagen group's product range in India with EA 189 engine series. This included 1.2-, 1.5-, 1.6-, 2.0- and 3.0- litre TDI diesel engine variants across multiple different models, the Škoda Octavia, Škoda Laura, Volkswagen Jetta, Škoda Superb, Volkswagen Passat, Škoda Fabia, Volkswagen Polo Mk5, Škoda Yeti, Škoda Rapid (India), Volkswagen Vento (A05), Audi A4, Audi A6, Audi Q3, Audi Q5, Audi Q7, Audi A8 and multiple other Volkswagen Group TDI Diesel Cars sold in India were found Cheating Emission Norms and the Indian Government and NGT fined Volkswagen heavily. The report called the defeat device "not a product failure but a clear case of cheating".

===== Italy =====
On 6 October 2015 Italy's regulator of competition announced plans to investigate whether Volkswagen engaged in "improper commercial practices" when promoting its affected diesel vehicles. On 15 October 2015, Italian State Police raided Volkswagen offices in Verona, and Volkswagen's Lamborghini offices in Bologna, placing six executives under investigation.

===== Israel =====
In 2013, the Israeli Licensing Institutes Association sent a letter to Amir Zaltsberg, head of vehicle emissions at the Ministry of Environmental Protection, reporting that it was unable to properly conduct tests on Volkswagen diesel vehicles, although the symptoms observed differed from those later identified in the United States in 2015. Following the outbreak of the scandal, the Israel Tax Authority reviewed the tax benefits that had been granted to Volkswagen diesel cars (up to ₪15,000 per vehicle) and in December announced that the local importer, Champion Motors, would have to return a total of ₪100 million in grants.

===== Japan =====
In October 2015, Japan's Ministry of the Environment held an expert committee meeting to discuss this issue. There were 36 targeted cars which had been privately imported, although they were not sold through authorized resellers in Japan.

===== Netherlands =====
In December 2016 the Dutch consumers authority ACM decided to investigate whether Dutch laws were broken and consumers misled, a report was due by June 2017. 5,000 Dutch Volkswagen owners have signed up for a class action lawsuit. Netherlands has spent billions of euros on subsidies in energy-efficient cars in the recent years. Jesse Klaver from the political party GroenLinks responded that the Netherlands must claim back money from the car manufacturers if it emerges that they have committed fraud in the Netherlands.

===== Norway =====
Norway's prosecutors opened a criminal investigation into possible economic crimes committed by VW.

In May 2016, Norway's sovereign wealth fund, the world's largest ($850 bn) and also one of the company's biggest investors, announced legal action against Volkswagen, to be filed in Germany as part of a class-action lawsuit being prepared there.

===== Romania =====
On 1 October 2015 the Romanian Automotive Register (RAR) stopped issuing registration documents for Volkswagen vehicles equipped with Euro 5 diesel engines.

===== South Africa =====
On 28 September 2015, the departments of Environmental Affairs and Transport and the National Regulator for Compulsory Specifications said they still needed to determine whether local cars had been affected by the rigging of US vehicle emissions tests.

===== South Korea =====
As of 19 January 2016 South Korea, the world's eighth-largest diesel-car market, planned a criminal case against Volkswagen executives. On 22 September 2015 South Korean authorities announced pollution control investigations into cars manufactured by Volkswagen and other European car-manufacturers. Park Pan-kyu, a deputy director at South Korea's environment ministry said: "If South Korean authorities find problems in the Volkswagen diesel cars, the probe could be expanded to all German diesel cars".

In November 2015, after defeat devices had been found in some Volkswagen models, the Environment Minister issued a fine of ₩14,100,000,000 and ordered the cars to be recalled. As of 20 January 2016, the country's environmental agency had filed criminal charges against VW, seeking up to $48 billion in penalties. Johannes Thammer, managing director of Audi Volkswagen Korea, was placed under investigation and faced up to five years in prison and a fine of up to ₩30,000,000. Volkswagen's recall plan for South Korea, submitted on 6 January 2016, was rejected by the authorities, as it failed to meet a number of key legal requirements. Authorities are also reported to have rejected a revised plan on 23 March 2016 for the same reasons. In May 2016, following a wider investigation of 20 diesel-powered cars, South Korean authorities accused Nissan of using a defeat device for manipulating emissions data for the British-built Nissan Qashqai, allegations which the Japanese carmaker denied.

In August 2019, the government announced a ban on 8 VW Group diesel models cars for cheating emissions regulations.

===== Spain =====
As of 28 October 2015, a Spanish court had opened a criminal probe against Volkswagen AG, to establish whether the company's actions broke any local laws.

===== Sweden =====
As of 29 September 2015, Sweden's chief prosecutor was considering starting a preliminary investigation into Volkswagen's emissions violations.

===== Switzerland =====
On 26 September 2015 Switzerland banned sales of Volkswagen diesel cars, marking the most severe step taken so far by a government in reaction to the emissions crisis.

===== United Kingdom =====
The Department for Transport announced on 24 September 2015 that it would begin re-testing cars from a variety of manufacturers to ensure the use of "defeat devices" was not industry wide. The UK Parliamentary Transport Select Committee opened an enquiry into Volkswagen Emissions Violations with evidence sessions on 12 October 2015 and 25 January 2016. The Select Committee published a letter from Paul Willis, managing director of Volkswagen Group UK Ltd of 21 December 2015 stating: "In very simple terms, the software did amend the NO_{x} characteristics in testing. The vehicles did meet EU5 standards, so it clearly contributed to meeting the EU5 standards in testing".

A report on "real world" tests commissioned by the Government published in April 2016 showed emissions from 37 diesel engines up to 14 times higher than had been claimed, with every vehicle exceeding the legal limit of nitrogen oxide emissions. Only Volkswagen group vehicles were found to have test cycle detection software.

In January 2017, an action group announced it had 25,000 vehicle owners who were seeking compensation of £3,000–4,000 per vehicle.

In May 2022, VW UK settled UK class action claims from around 90,000 drivers, totalling £193m, without admitting liability. Due to time limitations, Dieselgate victims not part of this group litigation will unlikely be able to make a claim from May 2022 onwards.

===== United States =====
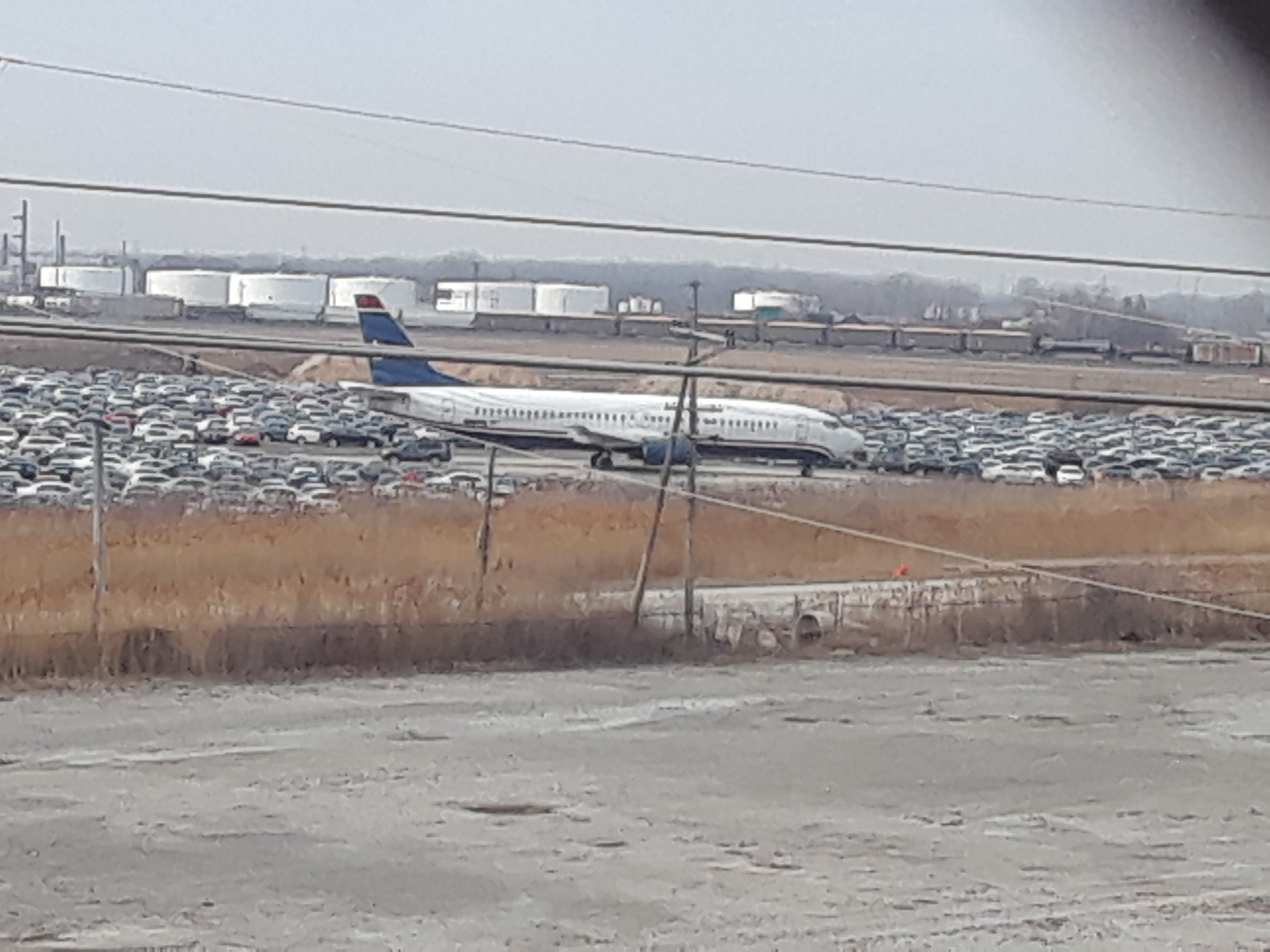
Recalled Volkswagens stored at Gary/Chicago International Airport

VW suspended sales of TDI-equipped cars in the US on 20 September 2015. On 21 September 2015 the EPA announced that should the allegations be proven, Volkswagen Group could face fines of up to US$37,500 per vehicle (about US$18 billion in total). In addition to possible civil fines, the United States Department of Justice Environment and Natural Resources Division were doing a criminal probe of Volkswagen AG's conduct. 22 September 2015 The United States House Energy Subcommittee on Oversight and Investigations announced that it would hold a hearing into the Volkswagen scandal while New York Attorney General Eric Schneiderman said that his investigation was already underway. As of 29 October 2015, over 25 other states' attorneys general, and the Federal Bureau of Investigation in Detroit, were involved in similar investigations. On 12 November 2015, the FBI confirmed to engineering magazine Ingeniøren that it had an ongoing investigation, after previous unconfirmed reports.

As of 6 October 2015, the EPA decided to broaden its investigations onto 28 diesel-powered models made by BMW, Chrysler, General Motors, Land Rover and Mercedes-Benz. The agency would initially focus on one used vehicle of each model, and widen the probe if it encountered suspicious data. The EPA has described the hidden Volkswagen pollution as "knowing endangerment". In May 2016, the owners of Mercedes-Benz confirmed that the US Justice Department asked Daimler AG to run an internal investigation into its diesel emissions testing, as well.

On 4 January 2016, the Justice Department, on behalf of the EPA, brought suit against Volkswagen in the United States District Court for the Eastern District of Michigan in Detroit. The complaint, seeking up to $46 billion in penalties for Clean Air Act violations, alleged that Volkswagen equipped certain 2.0 and 3.0-litre diesel-engine vehicles with emissions cheating software, causing NO_{x} pollution to exceed EPA's standards during normal driving conditions. It further claimed that Volkswagen entities provided misleading information and that material omissions impeded and obstructed "efforts to learn the truth about the (excess) emissions". while "so far recall discussions with the company have not produced an acceptable way forward". On 9 January 2016, US officials criticized Volkswagen for citing German law in order to withhold documents from a group of states investigating the company's actions. Schneiderman also complained over Volkswagen's slowness in producing documents from its US files, claiming the company "has sought to delay responses until it completes its 'independent investigation' several months from now".

On 12 January 2016, US regulators rejected Volkswagen's recall plans for its affected 2.0-litre diesel engines, submitted to CARB in December 2015, claiming that these "do not adequately address overall impacts on vehicle performance, emissions and safety". Volkswagen confirmed that its discussions with CARB will continue, and said that the company is working on bringing "a package together which satisfies our customers first and foremost and then also the regulators". The states of Arizona, West Virginia, New Mexico, and Texas, as well as Harris County, Texas, all filed separate lawsuits seeking restitution from VW. The company also faces investigations by 48 United States state attorneys (as of February 2016).

On 29 March 2016, Volkswagen was additionally sued by the United States Federal Trade Commission for false advertising due to fraudulent claims made by the company in its promotion of the affected models, which touted the "environmental and economic advantages" of diesel engines and contained claims of low emissions output. The suit was consolidated into existing litigation over the matter in San Francisco, which would allow the FTC to participate in global settlements over the matter.

Additionally, in the United States, the Environmental Protection Agency (EPA) developed additional tests for its action plan and extended its emissions certification process. U.S. regulators such as the Federal Trade Commission and Department of Justice mandated that Volkswagen cease all misleading advertising and prohibited the company from using devices intended to manipulate emission tests.

The Ninth U.S. Circuit Court of Appeals ruled on 1 June 2020 that Volkswagen was liable for further legal damage lawsuits brought by state and local governments in the emissions fraud. The unanimous ruling by the court paved the way for two counties in Florida and Utah to proceed with litigation against Volkswagen, as well as potential further cases brought by jurisdictions in the US. By June 2020, VW had already expended $33.3 billion in settlements and other costs including buybacks of the excessively polluting diesel vehicles. In a statement, VW said it would ask the circuit court to review the ruling, and that the company, if necessary, would take the case to the U.S. Supreme Court.

====== Charges against Volkswagen engineering/management ======
On 9 September 2016, James Robert Liang, a Volkswagen engineer working at Volkswagen's testing facility in Oxnard, California, admitted as part of a plea deal with the US Department of Justice that the defeat device had been purposely installed in US vehicles with the knowledge of his engineering team: "Liang admitted that beginning in about 2006, he and his co-conspirators started to design a new "EA 189" diesel engine for sale in the United States. ... When he and his co-conspirators realized that they could not design a diesel engine that would meet the stricter US emissions standards, they designed and implemented [the defeat device] software".

On 7 January 2017, former top emissions compliance manager for Volkswagen in the US Oliver Schmidt was arrested by the FBI on a charge of conspiracy to defraud the United States. On 11 January 2017 Volkswagen pleaded guilty to weaving a vast conspiracy to defraud the US government and obstructing a federal investigation and agreed to pay a US$2.8 billion criminal fine and US$1.5 billion in civil penalties. In addition, six executives have been criminally charged.

On 3 May 2018, former Volkswagen CEO Martin Winterkorn was indicted on fraud and conspiracy charges in the emissions scandal case. He has repeatedly denied any knowledge of the rigged emissions tests.

====== Settlement ======
On 25 October 2016, a final settlement was approved by a judge. About 475,000 Volkswagen owners in the US were given the choice between a buyback or a free fix and compensation, if a repair becomes available. Volkswagen will begin administering the settlement immediately, having already devoted several hundred employees to handling the process. Buybacks range in value from $12,475 to $44,176, including restitution payments, and vary based on mileage. People who opt for a fix approved by the Environmental Protection Agency will receive payouts ranging from $5,100 to $9,852, depending on the book value of their car.

Of the buyback, 138,000 had been completed by 18 February 2017 with 150,000 more to be returned. 52,000 chose to keep their cars. 67,000 diesel cars from model year 2015 were cleared for repairs, but left uncertainty about the future of 325,000 "Generation One" diesel VWs from the 2009–2014 model years, which use the "lean NO_{x} trap" and would be harder to repair.

In March 2018, Reuters reported that 294,000 cars from the buyback program have been stored at 37 regional US staging sites; some of the first reported sites included: Colorado Springs, Colorado; Pontiac, Michigan; Baltimore, Maryland; San Bernardino, California; and Gary, Indiana.

Volkswagen will also pay $2.7 billion for environmental mitigation and another $2 billion for clean-emissions infrastructure. Toward that end, Volkswagen formed a U.S. subsidiary called Electrify America, LLC., based in Reston, Virginia, that will manage the $2 billion brand-neutral zero-emission vehicle infrastructure programs and marketing campaigns for the next ten years. The group will get four installments of $500 million, at 2 1/2-year intervals, subject to California Air Resources Board and U.S. EPA approval. Volkswagen planned to install hundreds of chargers with 50, 150 and even some ultra-fast 320 kW charge rate, beginning in California in 2017. Competing charge networks (and automakers) saw the effort as controversial. In August 2018, Electrify America launched the first national media advertising campaign to promote electric vehicles; it featured the Chevy Bolt, with other EVs in cameo roles.

====== Securities and Exchange Commission lawsuit ======
On 14 March 2019, the U.S. Securities and Exchange Commission filed a complaint against Volkswagen and its former CEO Martin Winterkorn alleging that they defrauded investors by selling corporate bonds and asset-backed securities while knowingly making false and misleading statements to government regulators, underwriters, and consumers as to the quality of their automobiles.

==== Private actions ====
By 27 September 2015 at least 34 class-action lawsuits had been filed in the United States and Canada on behalf of Volkswagen and Audi owners, accusing Volkswagen of breach of contract, fraudulent concealment, false advertising, and violations of federal and state laws, and positing the "diminished value" of diesels that will be fixed to conform with pollution regulations, due to possible reductions in horsepower and fuel efficiency. According to Reuters, one reason class action lawyers were able to mobilize so fast is that the company's marketing to upscale professionals, including jurists, had backfired.

As of 30 September 2015, at least one investor lawsuit seeking class action status for holders of Volkswagen American Depositary Receipts had been filed in the United States seeking compensation for the drop in stock value due to the emissions scandal.

On 7 October 2015, the Los Angeles Times reported that the number of class-action lawsuits filed had grown to more than 230.

On 19 November 2015, ABC News Australia reported that more than 90,000 VW, Audi and Skoda diesel vehicle owners had filed a class action lawsuit against Volkswagen in the country's Federal Court.

On 8 December 2015, the United States Judicial Panel on Multidistrict Litigation issued an order consolidating over 500 class actions against Volkswagen into a single multidistrict litigation, captioned In re: Volkswagen 'Clean Diesel' Marketing, Sales Practices, and Products Liability Litigation, MDL No. 2672, and transferred the entire MDL to Judge Charles R. Breyer of the federal district court for the Northern District of California.

On 21 January 2016, Judge Breyer held a hearing on the requests by over 150 plaintiff's attorneys for some kind of leadership role in the gigantic Volkswagen MDL, of which over 50 sought to serve as lead counsel or to chair the plaintiffs' steering committee. More than 100 of those attorneys tried to squeeze into his San Francisco courtroom to argue their requests in person, and some of them had to stand in the aisles or in the outside hallway. That afternoon, Judge Breyer issued an order naming 22 attorneys to a plaintiffs' steering committee, and of those, selected Elizabeth Cabraser of Lieff Cabraser as chair of the committee. On the other side, Volkswagen hired Robert Giuffra of Sullivan & Cromwell as its lead defense counsel in the MDL.

On 14 March 2016, Volkswagen AG was sued in Germany for allegedly failing to inform financial markets in a timely manner about defeat devices used in diesel engines. The suit on behalf of 278 institutional investors seeks €3.3 billion (US$3.7 billion at March 2016 exchange rate) in compensation. BlackRock Inc., the world's largest asset manager, joined other institutional investors in the lawsuit in September 2016.

In November 2015, Moody's Investors Service downgraded Volkswagen's bond credit rating from A2 to A3. Fitch Ratings downgraded Volkswagen's Long-term Issuer Default Rating by two notches to BBB+, with a negative outlook.

In May 2016, The Children's Investment Fund Management, run by Chris Hohn and retaining a 2 percent stake in Volkswagen preference stock, launched a campaign aiming to overhaul the company's executive pay system, arguing that "for years management has been richly rewarded with massive compensation despite presiding over a productivity and profit collapse", thereby leading to an "aggressive management behavior" and contributing to the diesel emission scandal. Later the same month, German investor group DSW called for an independent audit of Volkswagen's emissions-cheating practices, arguing that the company's internal investigation might not necessarily make everything transparent to smaller shareholders.

On 28 June 2016, Volkswagen agreed to pay $15.3 billion to settle the various public and private civil actions in the United States, the largest settlement ever of an automobile-related consumer class action in United States history. On 25 October 2016, a U.S. federal judge approved the settlement. Up to $10 billion will be paid to 475,000 Volkswagen or Audi owners whose cars are equipped with 2.0-litre diesel engines. Owners can also opt to have their car repaired free of charge or can sell it back to the company, who will pay back its estimated value from before the scandal began. Leases can also be terminated without incurring penalty charges. Independent of which options are selected, owners will still receive compensation ranging from $5,000 to $10,000 per affected car. Additionally, should they choose to decline the offer, they are free to pursue independent legal action against the firm. The settlement also includes $2.7 billion for environmental mitigation, $2 billion to promote zero-emissions vehicles and $603 million for claims by 44 states, Washington, D.C., and Puerto Rico. Volkswagen agreed not to resell or export any vehicles it repurchases unless an approved emission repair has been completed. As of 28 June 2016, no practical engineering solutions that would bring the vehicles into compliance with emission standards had been publicly identified. The consumer settlement will resolve all claims by participating consumers against Volkswagen and all its associates, except for any potential claims against Robert Bosch GmbH. Bosch supplied two exhaust treatment components and engine control software. In the case of 3.0-litre V6 TDI engines, Volkswagen suggested it can provide an uncomplicated fix that will bring the vehicles into compliance without adversely affecting performance, a move that the company hopes will avoid an expensive buyback of these cars.

=== European Investment Bank's possible involvement ===
In January 2016, documents obtained by CEE Bankwatch Network provided more details for a European Investment Bank statement that its loans to Volkswagen may have been connected to the car makers use of cheating devices to rig emission tests. The 'Antrieb RDI' loan was supposedly for creating cleaner drive trains.

However, during the bank's annual press conference on 14 January 2016, the bank president, Werner Hoyer, admitted that the €400,000,000 loan might have been used in the creation of an emissions defeat device. Many redacted documents obtained by Bankwatch, along with the EIB not disclosing the details of the loan, hint to the bank possibly already knowing that there were some discrepancies with the 'Antrieb RDI' loan.

In 2017, the European Anti-Fraud Office (OLAF) found that Volkswagen had misled the bank about the car company's use of emissions cheating software, in a scandal that has become known as Dieselgate.

Also in 2017, Hoyer said the bank did not find "any indication" that its loans had been misused. However, six months later news website Politico reported that Olaf had concluded that Volkswagen acquired the EIB loan through "fraud" and "deception".

=== Models affected ===
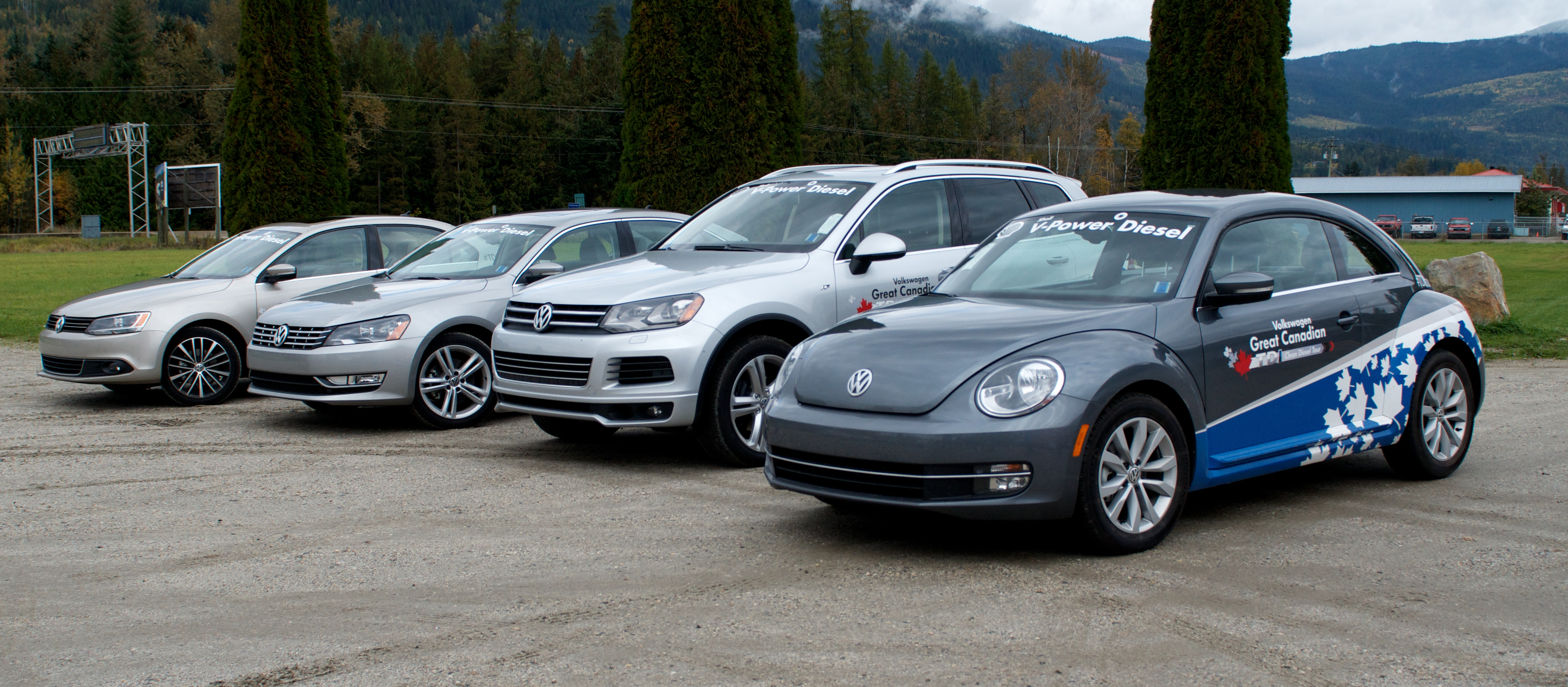
Vehicle line-up at 2012 Volkswagen Great Canadian Clean Diesel Tour

By 22 September 2015, Volkswagen had admitted that 11 million vehicles sold worldwide are affected in addition to the 480,000 vehicles with 2.0 L TDI engines sold in the US. According to Volkswagen, vehicles sold in other countries with the 1.6 L and 2.0 L 4-cylinder TDI engine known as Type EA189 are also affected. This software is also said to affect EA188 and the 2015 EA288 generation of the four-cylinder. Worldwide, around 1.2 million Skodas and 2.1 million Audis may contain the software, including TTs and Qs. VW states that Euro6 model in Germany are not affected, while 2015 US models with the same EA288 engines are affected. This suggests that normal-operation measurements that place the EA288 NO_{x} emissions between the two standards' limits were readily available at Volkswagen headquarters in Germany. According to Müller, the 1.2 and 2.0-litre models may be updated by software, whereas the around 3 million 1.6-litre require various hardware solutions, and some cars may even be replaced. The cars are so diverse that many different solutions are required.

Over one quarter of Volkswagen's sales in the US are diesel-powered vehicles. The corporation has chosen a market strategy that emphasizes clean diesel over electric cars or hybrid electric vehicles.

The vehicles affected by the recall in the US include the following model years:

- 2009–2015 Audi A3 2.0 L TDI
- 2009–2015 Volkswagen Beetle 2.0 L TDI
- 2009–2015 Volkswagen Beetle Convertible 2.0 L TDI
- 2009–2015 Volkswagen Golf 2.0 L TDI
- 2015 Volkswagen Golf Sportwagen 2.0 L TDI
- 2009–2015 Volkswagen Jetta 2.0 L TDI
- 2009–2014 Volkswagen Jetta Sportwagen 2.0 L TDI
- 2012–2015 Volkswagen Passat 2.0 L TDI

The EPA revealed on 2 November 2015 that Volkswagen had shipped additional diesel models with defeat devices, including the 2014 VW Touareg and the 2015 Porsche Cayenne. Model year 2016 Audi Quattro diesels were also found affected, including several 2016 Audi Quattro models (the 2016 Audi Quattro A6, A7, A8, A8L, and Q5). Cynthis Giles, the EPA Assistant Administrator for Office of Enforcement and Compliance Assurance, called out the company for further refusing to take responsibility for its failure to comply with the law. Under US federal Clean Air Act, Volkswagen could be liable for up to $375 million in fines.

==== Resale value ====
As of 26 October 2015, the resale value of affected model cars in the US was down from 5 to nearly 16 percent depending on model as compiled by Black Book and Kelley Blue Book based on used car auction prices, the volume of which was also down.

On 15 March 2016, Volkswagen Financial Services took a writedown of €353,000,000 to cover a potential decline in the residual value of the fleet of its leased cars.

=== Effects on Volkswagen corporate ===
==== Stock value ====
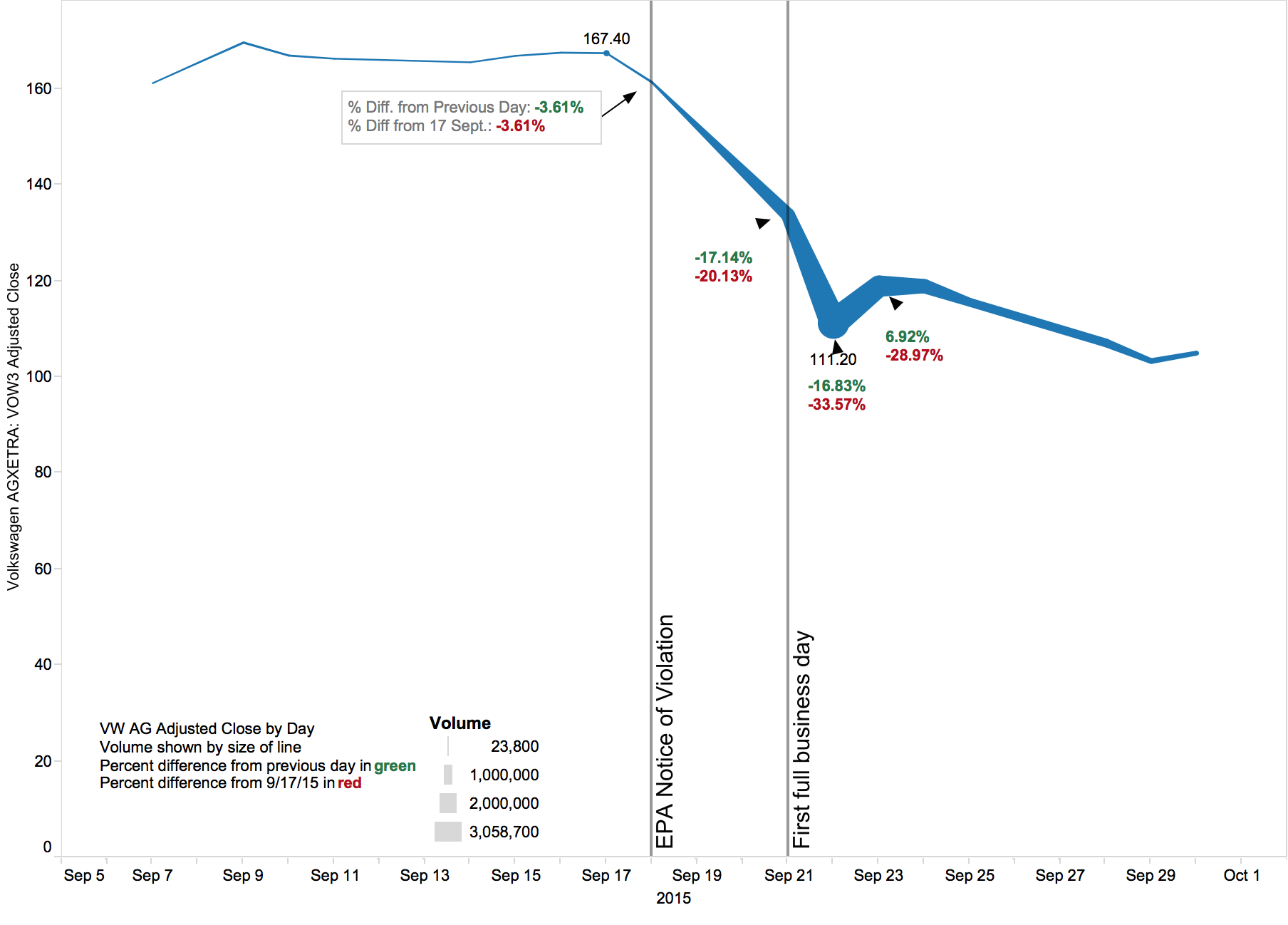
Price of Volkswagen AG (VOW.DE) stock, Adjusted Close. Width of line shows Volume. Text in green is the percent difference from previous day's close. In red is the percent difference from the close on 17 September 2015.

Price of Volkswagen AG (VOW.DE) stock 17 September–5 October 2015
| Date | Adj Close | Volume | % diff from 17 Sep | % diff from previous day |
|---|---|---|---|---|
| 17 September | 167 | 60,600 | 0.00% | |
| 18 September | 161 | 112,700 | −3.61% | −3.61% |
| 21 September | 134 | 1,496,700 | −20.13% | −17.14% |
| 22 September | 111 | 3,058,700 | −33.57% | −16.83% |
| 23 September | 119 | 2,381,300 | −28.97% | 6.92% |
| 24 September | 119 | 1,542,800 | −28.97% | 0.00% |
| 25 September | 116 | 880,700 | −30.97% | −2.82% |
| 28 September | 107 | 865,400 | −36.02% | −7.31% |
| 29 September | 103 | 513,700 | −38.29% | −3.55% |
| 30 September | 105 | 416,500 | −37.31% | 1.60% |
| 1 October | 105 | 477,700 | −38.59% | 0.10% |
| 2 October | 101 | 588,700 | −39.58% | −3.71% |
| 5 October | 103 | 754,400 | −38.59% | 1.63% |

On 21 September 2015, the first day of trading after the EPA's Notice of Violation to Volkswagen became public, share prices of Volkswagen AG fell 20 percent on the Frankfurt Stock Exchange. On 22 September, the stock fell another 12 percent. On 23 September, the stock quickly fell 10.5 percent, dropping below €100 to a record 4-year low before regaining some lost ground. Share prices of other German automakers were also affected, with BMW down 4.9 percent and Daimler down 5.8%. A year later Volkswagen stock was down by 30 percent.

Qatar, one of the biggest Volkswagen shareholders with a 17 percent stake in the company, lost nearly $5 billion as the company stock value fell.

==== Sales ====
The US sale of Volkswagens was 23,882 vehicles in November 2015, a 24.7 percent decline from November 2014.

In South Korea, sales in November rose 66 percent to 4,517 units from a year ago due to the Volkswagen's aggressive marketing efforts such as a discount of up to ₩18,000,000 (US$15,600 at December 2015 exchange rates) for some models.

In Great Britain, the scandal did not affect sales, which increased in 2016 to an all-point high, placing Volkswagen second in the league of best-selling cars.

VW sales across Europe returned to growth in April 2016 for the first time since the scandal broke, with a group market share of 25.2 percent, compared to its previous level of 26.1 percent.

=== Company Consequences ===
Following the Volkswagen scandal, the incident triggered substantial political, regulatory, and market reactions. Research found that when companies are caught lying to the market, investors, and partners, much of the trust they earned along the way is significantly diminished. This adds to more pressure from shareholders and banks pushing for changes in how the company was managed, banks become less helpful, and business partners begin to pull away.

While Volkswagen faced struggles with company-based trust, the scandal also caused widespread damage to its public reputation. The incident left the company to regain public trust after individuals discovered they had been lied to about emission testing.

Experts also pointed to problems in Volkswagen's corporate governance. In most cases, the board of directors is intended to keep a close tab on the company's management. However, according to sources, there were three major problems with the Volkswagen board structure. The first was dual-class stock, which gave too much power to the Porsche and Piëch families, ultimately creating biased incentives. The next was the government, a major shareholder that left room for complex decision-making. Lastly, the principle of codetermination required employee representatives on the board, therefore affecting how the board functioned as a whole.

=== Industry consequences ===
Renault believes that diesel cars would become significantly more expensive when re-engineered to comply with new emissions regulations as a result of the Volkswagen disclosures, to the point that diesel cars may not be competitive. Industry-wide, small diesel engines are being replaced by bigger ones, and electric car sales have risen.

Suzuki had won the case to terminate its partnership with Volkswagen at the International Court of Arbitration of the International Chamber of Commerce and dissolved the capital tie-up until September 2015, and was not involved in this scandal.

On 16 June 2016, Volkswagen announced plans to make major investments into the production of electric vehicles; Matthias Müller predicted that Volkswagen would introduce 30 all-electric models over the next 10 years, and that electric vehicles would account for around a quarter of its annual sales by 2025. Volkswagen plans to fund the initiative by streamlining its operations and engaging in cost-cutting. Müller stated that the changes would "require us – following the serious setback as a result of the diesel issue – to learn from mistakes made, rectify shortcomings and establish a corporate culture that is open, value-driven and rooted in integrity". Volkswagen plans a battery factory near Salzgitter to compensate for the reduced numbers of piston engines.

In November 2016, Volkswagen and its labour unions agreed to reduce the workforce by 30,000 people until 2021 as a result of the costs from the violations. However, 9,000 new jobs would come by producing more electric cars. Volkswagen CEO Herbert Diess stated to the German financial publication Handelsblatt that the company planned to stop marketing diesel models in the U.S., citing "the legal framework".

=== Secondary market consequences ===
A study by the researchers Itai Ater and Nir S. Yoseph from Tel Aviv University explored the effect of the scandal on the secondary market in Israel. They report that the scandal had a statistically significant negative effect on the number of transactions in the secondary market involving the affected models (nearly -18 percent) and on their resale price (nearly -6 percent). The study also found that the reduction in the number of transactions was driven mostly by private sellers and that non-private sellers barely shied away from the market. These findings suggest that the supply of used cars among private sellers is much more elastic relative to the supply of used cars among non-private sellers. The authors argue that lower willingness-to-pay and adverse selection following Dieselgate could also explain those results. Apart from damaging the reputation of Volkswagen, the emission scam caused significant financial consequences for the company, estimated by the company itself at €31.3 billion in fees, penalties, buyback costs, and financial settlements.

== Other manufacturers ==
After news broke out of Volkswagen cheating on diesel emissions, multiple other vehicle manufacturers got caught falsifying emissions data, as well as exceeding legal emission limits. This uncovered a greater industry-wide issue that goes far beyond only Volkswagen Group.

Automakers who have been caught using a defeat device within a diesel vehicle, in a similar manner to Volkswagen include: Jeep and Ram under FCA (now a part of Stellantis), Opel (when under GM), and Mercedes-Benz.

In July 2021, BMW agreed to pay a €373 million (US$441 million) fine to settle an antitrust suit for setting the standards for diesel emissions, though they claimed to have already been cleared of suspicion for falsifying emissions data. In 2024, the company also settled a $6 million class-action lawsuit.

Other manufacturers have been accused, with varying amounts of evidence, of using diesel defeat devices in their vehicles, but have yet to be proven. Some of the manufacturers accused include: Toyota, Suzuki, BMW, Citroën and Peugeot under PSA (now a part of Stellantis), Mitsubishi, Nissan and Renault, Chevrolet and GMC, Ford, Cummins, as well as Hyundai and Kia.

While not all using defeat devices, diesel vehicles built by a wide range of carmakers, including Volvo, Renault, Mercedes, Jeep, Hyundai, Citroen, BMW, Mazda, Fiat, Ford and Peugeot had independent tests carried out by ADAC that proved that, under normal driving conditions, many diesel vehicles exceeded legal European emission limits for nitrogen oxide (NO_{x}), some by more than 10 times, and one by 14 times. Researchers have criticized the inadequacy of current regulations and called for the use of a UN-sanctioned test called Worldwide harmonized Light vehicles Test Procedures that better reflects real-life driving conditions, as well as on-road emissions testing via PEMS. The two types of new test started to come into force in 2017, with critics saying that car firms have lobbied fiercely to delay their implementation, due to the high cost of meeting stricter environmental controls.

Beyond exclusively diesel or passenger vehicles, automakers such as: Hino (subsidiary of Toyota), Hyundai and Kia, Nissan, Mazda, Yamaha Motors, Suzuki, Subaru, and others have been proven to be falsifying fuel economy and/or emissions data on non-diesel powered and/or commercial vehicles.

The Volkswagen scandal has increased scrutiny on combustion engines in general, and Volkswagen and several other car makes have been shown to pollute more than allowed. A French government report in 2016 investigated 86 different cars, and about 1/5th of those were found to comply with emission laws. One car was measured to emit 17 times more than allowed. An overview of tests showed that cars turned off the exhaust improvement device in many ordinary conditions, with 5 out 38 cars complying with regulations in an English test. A German test showed 10 out of 53 cars compliant when exposed to temperatures below 10 degrees Celsius. A French test showed 4 out of 52 cars compliant when tested outside (not in a laboratory).

A study conducted in March 2017 by ADAC, nearly two years after the scandal broke, found that 38 out of 40 diesel cars of all brands tested continued to fail a NO_{x}-test based on government standards. The worst performing vehicle out of the 40 was a Renault Captur dCi 90, which was exceeding legal NO_{x} levels by 900%.

== Reactions ==
=== Political figures ===
German Chancellor Angela Merkel stated she hoped that all facts in the matter would be made known promptly, urging "complete transparency". She additionally noted that Germany's transport minister, Alexander Dobrindt, was in ongoing communication with Volkswagen.

The German Green Party accused Merkel of knowing about the defeat devices with a "wink".

Michel Sapin, the French finance minister, called for an investigation of diesel-powered cars that would encompass the entire continent of Europe.

Catherine Bearder, MEP for South East England, commented on 27 October 2015 in the European Parliament that "we now have the political momentum for a radical overhaul that will ensure carmakers cannot dodge the rules", defending an EU resolution meant to specifically "cut deadly pollution from diesel vehicles". However, when the European Commission proceeded with passing legislation that allowed the car industry more time to comply with the newer regulation, while also permitting cars, even under the more "realistic" tests, to emit more than twice the legal limit of nitrogen oxides (NO_{x}) from 2019 and up to 50 percent more from 2021, Bearder denounced the legislation as "a disgraceful stitch-up by national governments, who are once again putting the interests of carmakers ahead of public health".

=== Automotive industry and other commentators ===
In wake of the dieselgate scandal in 2015, major car manufacturers, including Toyota, GM, PSA Peugeot Citroen, Renault, Mazda, Daimler (Mercedes Benz), and Honda, issued press statements reaffirming their vehicles' compliance with all regulations and legislation for the markets in which they operate; The Society of Motor Manufacturers and Traders described the issue as affecting "just one company", with no evidence to suggest that the whole industry might be affected. However, in years following these statements, it has come to light that multiple other automakers outside of Volkswagen, including multiple listed above, had been using defeat devices in their vehicles in a similar manner to VW. Along with other reports of many other manufacturers falsely reporting on emissions and fuel economy numbers.

Renault-Nissan CEO Carlos Ghosn said it would be difficult for an automaker to conceal internally an effort to falsify vehicle emissions data, such as has happened at Volkswagen AG: "I don't think you can do something like this hiding in the bushes."

Jim Holder, the editorial director of Haymarket Automotive, which publishes WhatCar and AutoCar, opined that there had never been a scandal in the automotive industry of this size.

A commentary in Spiegel Online argued that the Volkswagen scandal will affect the entire German industry, and that German companies operating abroad will face a decrease in competitiveness.

Alan Brown, chairman of the Volkswagen National Dealer Advisory Council, commented on the scandal's negative impact on US dealers, who were already struggling with overpriced products and a deteriorating relationship between the company and the dealer body. Car and Driver similarly emphasized Volkswagen's inability to efficiently operate in the US market, while also suggesting that the company had grossly underestimated the EPA's power, and inexplicably failed to go public before the story broke, despite receiving ample warning.

Tesla Motors CEO Elon Musk was asked about his opinion whether the scandal will weaken the consumer's view on green technologies; he responded saying he expects the opposite to happen: "What Volkswagen is really showing is that we've reached the limit of what's possible with diesel and petrol. The time has come to move to a new generation of technology."

Similarly, analysts at Fitch suggested the Volkswagen diesel emissions crisis was likely to affect the entire automotive industry, with petrol cars potentially enjoying a revival in Europe and greater investment being poured into electric vehicles. Other commentators argued that the diesel engine will nevertheless regain its footing in the market, due to its international indispensability, low CO_{2} emissions and strong presence in the US pickup– and commercial–truck segments.

On 29 September 2015, S&P Dow Jones Indices and RobecoSAM stated that Volkswagen AG's stock will be de-listed from the Dow Jones Sustainability indexes after close of trading on 5 October 2015. Among the reasons for the de-listing, the statement issued by RobecoSAM cited social and ethical reasons, and confirmed that Volkswagen will no longer be identified as an Industry Group Leader in the "Automobiles & Components" industry group.

In early October, Green Car Journal rescinded its Green Car of the Year awards, for models that "best raise the bar in environmental performance", that were given to the 2009 Volkswagen Jetta TDI and 2010 Audi A3 TDI models.

In December 2015, a group of business and environmental leaders, including Tesla CEO Elon Musk, addressed an open letter to CARB, urging the agency to absolve Volkswagen of recalling the 85,000 diesel vehicles affected by the scandal in the US, and argued that Volkswagen should instead be asked to allocate resources to an accelerated rollout of zero-emissions vehicles ("cure the air, not the cars"). The letter, which includes a 5-step legally enforceable plan, argues that this course of action could result in a "10 for 1 or greater reduction in pollutant emissions as compared to the pollution associated with the diesel fleet cheating", while suggesting that the affected vehicles on the road in California "represent an insignificant portion of total vehicles emissions in the State" and "do not, individually, present any emissions-related risk to their owners or occupants". Similar requests were put forward by the American Lung Association, who petitioned the EPA to determine Volkswagen to promote zero-emissions vehicles, build sustainable transport infrastructure and retrofit older diesel models with superior emissions controls.

Volkswagen got a 2016 Ig Nobel Prize in chemistry from the scientific humor magazine Annals of Improbable Research for "solving the problem of excessive automobile pollution emissions by automatically, electromechanically producing fewer emissions whenever the cars are being tested".

=== Media ===
The Volkswagen TDI emissions scandal has received widespread negative media exposure, with headlines fronting the websites of multiple news gathering and reporting organizations. Reuters said that the crisis at Volkswagen could be a bigger threat to the German economy than the consequences of the 2015 Greek sovereign debt default. Deutsche Welle, one of Germany's state broadcasters, said that a "lawsuit tsunami" was headed for Volkswagen and that the scandal had dealt a blow to the country's psyche and "Made in Germany" brand. Popular Mechanics said that the scandal "is much worse than a recall", highlighting that Volkswagen had engaged in a pattern of "cynical deceit".

The Volkswagen emissions cheating scandal has joined the ranks of other -gate suffix stories, with media coining both Dieselgate and Emissionsgate to describe it.

=== Public polling ===
Despite the scandal, one poll conducted for Bild suggested that the majority of Germans (55 percent) still have "great faith" in Volkswagen, with over three-quarters believing that other carmakers are equally guilty of manipulation. Similarly, a poll conducted by the management consultancy Prophet in October 2015 indicated that two-thirds of Germans believe the scandal to be exaggerated and continue to regard Volkswagen as a builder of "excellent cars". A survey by Northwestern University's Kellogg School of Management, Brand Imperatives and Survata said that nearly 50 percent of US consumers had either a positive or very positive impression of Volkswagen, while 7.5 percent had a "very negative" impression. Another US survey by market researcher AutoPacific found that 64 percent of vehicle owners do not trust Volkswagen and only 25 percent of them have a positive view of Volkswagen following the scandal.

== See also ==
- Exhaust gas recirculation
- FTP-75
- NOx adsorber
- Vehicle regulation
