= Michael Horn =

Michael Horn may refer to:

- Michael Horn (businessman), chief executive officer and president of Volkswagen Group of America
- Michael "J" Horn, American pop singer
- Mike Horn, South African-born Swiss explorer and adventurer

== See also ==
- Michael Killisch-Horn (1940–2019), Austrian politician
- Michiel Horn, Canadian historian
