= Rupert Stadler =

German businessman

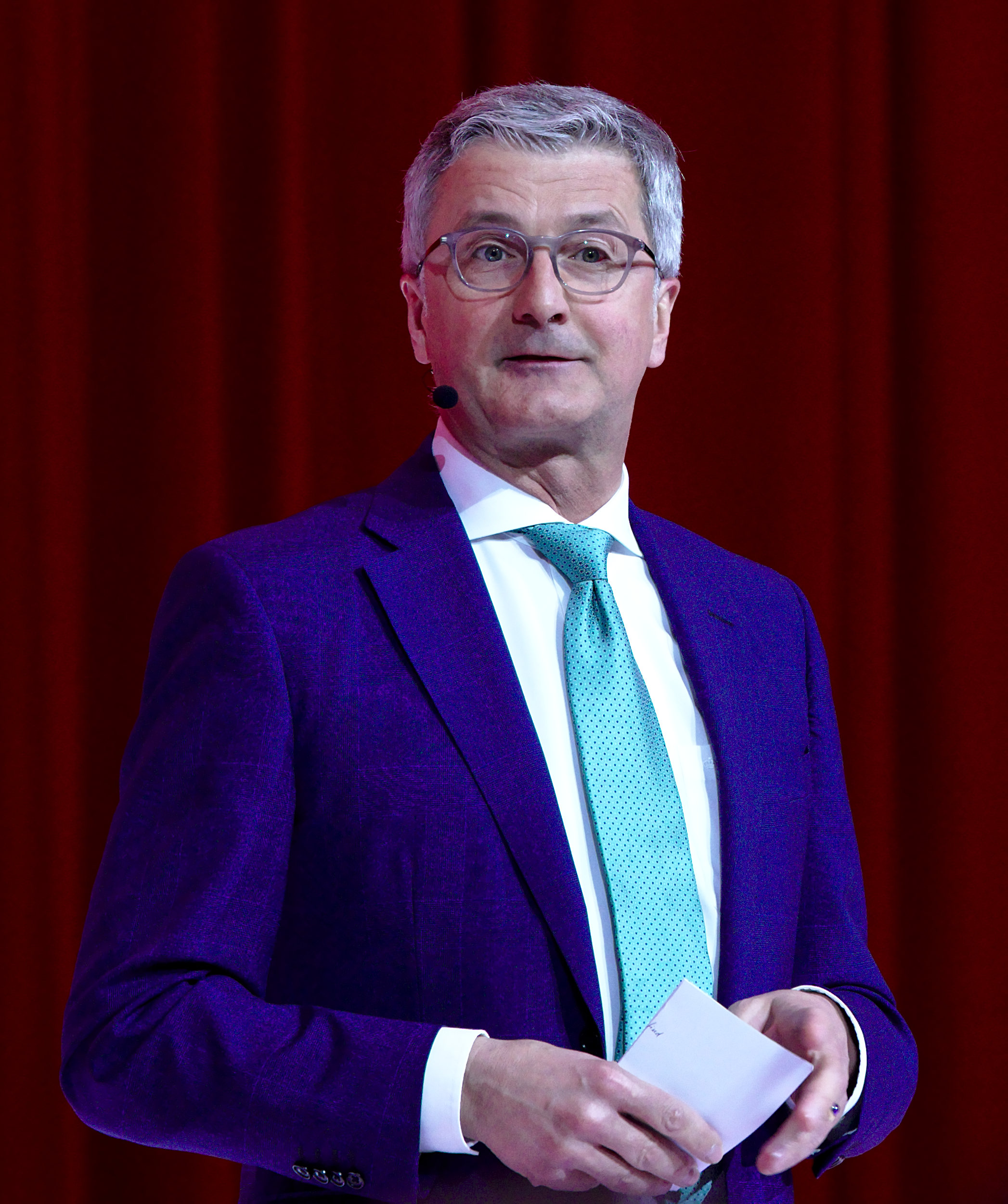
- Stadler in 2018
- Born: 17 March 1963 (age 63); Titting, Bavaria, West Germany
- Occupation: Businessman

Rupert Stadler (born 17 March 1963) is a German businessman and former chairman of the Vorstand (CEO) of Audi AG. He was arrested in June 2018 in connection with the Volkswagen emissions scandal. He was in custody in Germany until being released at the end of October 2018. In July 2019, Stadler was charged with fraud by prosecutors in Munich.

== Early life ==
Stadler was born in Wachenzell in the Eichstätt district of Bavaria, Germany. He studied business management at Augsburg University of Applied Sciences, majoring in corporate planning/controllership and finance, banking and investment.

== Career ==
After graduating, he started his career at Philips Kommunikation Industrie AG in Nuremberg.

Stadler joined Audi AG in 1990, assuming roles in sales and marketing. He became Commercial Director of Volkswagen/Audi España SA in 1994. From 1997 on, Stadler ran the office of the board of management of the Volkswagen Group. In January 2002, Stadler also became Head of Group Product Planning. He served as acting chairman of the board of Audi AG and its head of finance and organization until July 2007. He also served as the chairman of Automobili Lamborghini Holding SpA and Volkswagen Group Italia SpA. Stadler served as vice-chairman of the supervisory board at German football club FC Bayern AG until December 2018, when he was replaced by Volkswagen CEO Herbert Diess.

Stadler has been the chairman of the board and chief executive officer (CEO) of Audi AG since 1 January 2010, and served as its chief financial officer (CFO) since 12 January 2007.

Stadler has been a member of the supervisory board at MAN SE (alternate name Man AG) since 10 May 2007 and served as a Member of the supervisory board of Volkswagen Bank GmbH, and Volkswagen Financial Services AG. He has served as a member of the economic advisory council of Bayerische Landesbank since 1 December 2005.

== Dieselgate and arrest ==
Ever since Volkswagen admitted to use cheating software in November 2015, Stadler was under fire. In June 2018, Munich prosecutors named Stadler as a suspect in the widening Dieselgate scandal. A week later, Stadler was arrested and held in a prison in Augsburg. Prosecutors claimed he was tampering with evidence because of a phone call in which he suggested putting a witness on leave. Volkswagen initially suspended Stadler as CEO after the arrest, and on 2 October 2018, the company terminated all contracts with Stadler. Four weeks later, Stadler was released from custody against bail and under other conditions. Prosecutors continued naming him as a suspect.

== Trial ==
On 30 September 2020, Stadler begun to stand trial in a Munich court on charges of fraud, and knowingly selling cars that did not comply with environmental standards. After years of insisting at the trial that he did nothing wrong, Stadler accepted a plea deal offered by the judge on 3 May 2023 and pleaded guilty on 16 May 2023, becoming the highest-ranking executive to confess wrongdoing to date. He received a suspended sentence and a €1.1 million ($1.21 million) fine.

== Personal life ==
Stadler lives in Ingolstadt.
