= Seeger Weiss =

American plaintiffs' law firm

Seeger Weiss LLP is an American plaintiffs' law firm headquartered in Ridgefield Park, New Jersey. Founded in 1999 by Christopher A. Seeger and Stephen A. Weiss, former classmates at the Benjamin N. Cardozo School of Law, the firm focuses on multidistrict litigation (MDL), mass tort cases, and class action lawsuits. According to a 2020 study by ALM, Christopher Seeger received more MDL appointments than any other attorney in the country between 2016 and 2019.

== History ==
Seeger Weiss was founded in 1999 by Christopher A. Seeger and Stephen A. Weiss, former classmates at the Benjamin N. Cardozo School of Law. As of June 2026, the firm has offices in New Jersey, New York, Pennsylvania, and Florida.

== Lawsuits ==
In 2004, Merck withdrew its prescription pain medication Vioxx (rofecoxib) from the market after evidence emerged that the drug increased the risk of heart attack and stroke. Seeger Weiss served as co-lead counsel in the resulting litigation, which resolved in 2007 with a $4.85 billion settlement on behalf of approximately 45,000 plaintiffs.

Seeger Weiss filed suit on behalf of U.S. corn farmers in 2011, who alleged economic losses after Syngenta commercialized a genetically modified corn variety not yet approved for import by China, causing Chinese buyers to reject U.S. corn shipments. Seeger Weiss co-founders Christopher Seeger and Stephen Weiss jointly led the Plaintiffs' Executive and Steering Committees. The litigation settled for $1.51 billion in 2018.

In 2012, Christopher Seeger was appointed co-lead class counsel by U.S. District Judge Anita Brody in the National Football League Players' Concussion Injury Litigation, which consolidated claims by thousands of retired NFL players alleging the league had concealed evidence of the long-term neurological risks of repeated head trauma. In April 2015, Judge Brody granted final approval to a settlement structured as an uncapped monetary award fund covering more than 20,000 retired players over 65 years, with an estimated value exceeding $1 billion.

The settlement drew criticism from a portion of the player class; more than 200 former players or their families opted out and approximately 140 filed formal objections, arguing the agreement excluded players diagnosed with chronic traumatic encephalopathy (CTE) and applied dementia eligibility criteria more restrictive than standard clinical definitions. The United States Court of Appeals for the Third Circuit upheld the settlement in April 2016.

Seeger Weiss was appointed to the Plaintiffs' Steering Committee in litigation arising from the Volkswagen emissions scandal in 2015, in which Volkswagen was found to have installed software in its diesel vehicles to falsify emissions test results. The resulting settlements totaled over $21 billion, encompassing a vehicle buyback program, compensation for affected owners, and environmental remediation funds, and has been cited as the largest consumer class action settlement in U.S. automotive history.

In 2019, Christopher Seeger was selected by U.S. District Judge M. Casey Rodgers to serve as co-lead counsel in the 3M Combat Arms Earplug Products Liability Litigation, which consolidated claims by more than 240,000 current and former U.S. military personnel alleging that 3M's dual-ended Combat Arms earplugs were defectively designed, causing permanent hearing loss and tinnitus. The Star Tribune described the proceeding as one of the largest mass tort cases in American history. The litigation resolved in 2023 for more than $6 billion.

Philips recalled millions of continuous positive airway pressure (CPAP) and BiPAP devices in 2021, after determining that a sound-dampening foam component could degrade and release potentially harmful particles and gases. Seeger Weiss held a leadership role in the resulting multidistrict litigation in the Western District of Pennsylvania, which produced a $1.075 billion personal injury settlement, a $550+ million economic loss settlement, and a $25 million medical monitoring settlement.

In 2022, Christopher Seeger was appointed as co-lead counsel representing thousands of consumers in the Proton-Pump Inhibitor (PPI) Litigation, brought on behalf of patients who suffered kidney injuries while using PPI medications. There were various settlements that totaled over $500 million.

Seeger Weiss attorneys serve on the Plaintiffs' Executive and Settlement Committees in the National Prescription Opiate Litigation, a consolidated multidistrict litigation brought by thousands of state, local, and tribal governments against opioid manufacturers, distributors, and pharmacies. The Washington Post described the proceeding as "the largest federal court case in U.S. history."

Seeger Weiss co-founder Christopher Seeger was appointed Plaintiffs' Lead Negotiation Counsel in the Johnson & Johnson Talcum Powder Products Liability MDL in July 2025, which consolidates approximately 68,000 claims by women alleging they developed ovarian cancer after long-term use of Johnson & Johnson talcum powder products.

Seeger Weiss co-founder Christopher Seeger also serves as Counsel to the Co-Lead Counsel and Settlement Counsel in the Social Media Adolescent Addiction/Personal Injury Products Liability MDL (No. 3047), a federal multidistrict litigation before Judge Yvonne Gonzalez Rogers in the U.S. District Court for the Northern District of California, which consolidates thousands of lawsuits filed by individual plaintiffs, school districts, and state attorneys general against Meta, Google, ByteDance, and Snap, alleging the companies deliberately engineered addictive design features—such as infinite scroll and algorithmic recommendation systems—that caused mental health harms in adolescent users.

== Other ventures ==
In 2025, the firm donated $500,000 to the Bolch Judicial Institute at Duke University School of Law to establish the Seeger Weiss/Daniel Anderl Memorial Fund. The fund is named in memory of Daniel Anderl, son of U.S. District Judge Esther Salas, who was killed on July 19, 2020, when a gunman came to the family's New Jersey home targeting the judge.

== See also ==
- Multidistrict litigation
- Volkswagen emissions scandal
- National Prescription Opiate Litigation
- Mass tort
- Class action
- Health issues in American football
