= Michael Horn (businessman) =

German industrial manager (Volkswagen)

- Born: c. 1961
- Education: European University (BBA); University of San Francisco (MBA)
- Occupation: Business executive
- Employer: Volkswagen Group of America (former)
- Known for: President and CEO of Volkswagen Group of America (2014–2016)

Michael Horn (c. 1961) is a businessman and former chief executive officer and president of Volkswagen Group of America.

== Education ==
Horn is a business administration graduate. He received his bachelor's degree in Business Administration from the European University in Antwerp, Belgium and his Master of Business Administration degree from the University of San Francisco.

== Career ==
Horn spent 23 years at Volkswagen prior to being named chief executive of Volkswagen Group of America. From 2009 through 2013 he served as the head of Volkswagen Global After Sales which covers parts and service at dealerships. Initially, in 1990, he worked on group and brand strategy and, in 1997, he became responsible for North-Western European sales. In 2004, he became head of Sales for Europe. On January 1, 2014, he became CEO and President of Volkswagen Group of America. He left Volkswagen on 9 March 2016.

== Volkswagen diesel emissions violations ==
In September 2015, Volkswagen AG's diesel vehicles failed a U.S. Environmental Protection Agency (EPA) investigation for nitrogen oxides (NOx) emissions above the permissible limits. The emissions violations include cars produced by Volkswagen's American division, where Horn is currently CEO. Horn has admitted his company "screwed up" by using the vehicle's software to reduce emissions when it detects an emission testing, but allowing the diesel engines to produce pollutants above the legal limit under normal operating conditions.

On 8 October 2015, Volkswagen US CEO Michael Horn said in testimony before the U.S. Congress that it could take years to repair all the cars, especially the older models, due to the complex hardware and software changes that will be required. He also said that the fixes will likely preserve fuel economy ratings but, "there might be a slight impact on performance". An analyst viewed Horn's performance at the hearing as candid and complete.
