= Streetcarver =

The BMW Street Carver (styled StreetCarver) was a skateboard created by BMW. The deck is composite and wood, with cast aluminum trucks and swingarms articulated by rear stabilizer dogbone links (33-55-1-0-95-532) from an e39 BMW 5 Series car. It was designed by Steven Augustin DesignworksUSA. The Street Carver was produced from mid-2001 to 2004, with design changes in the swingarms implemented in 2002. Its original retail price was $495.

The Street Carver was notable for the striking appearance and its steering mechanism that gave it the ability to carve like a snowboard or surfboard. The Street Carver employed large, 110mm curved wheels, which were required because the axles roll in relation to the ground (i.e. change camber) as the board is turned (as opposed to traditional skateboarding axles, which remain parallel to the ground as the board is turned).

The Street Carver is a very smooth carving board at both low and high speeds. Due to its unique steering mechanism, the turning characteristics of the board are determined by the geometry of the swing lever arms, and cannot be modified (in contrast to the ability to adjust the bushings or kingpin on standard skateboard trucks).

Board dimensions: L 33.5" x W 11" x H 6.3" (L 85.09 cm x W 27.94 cm x H 16 cm)

== See also ==
- BMW F650CS — 2001–2005 motorcycle marketed as the "scarver", a portmanteau of street and carver
