= Diesel emissions scandal =

Automotive industry scandal

Nitrogen oxide (NO_{x}) on-road emissions by manufacturer and capacity Average NO_{x} emission (g/km) Euro 6 NO_{x} emission limit (g/km)

From 2014 onwards, software which manipulated air pollution tests was discovered in vehicles from some car makers; the software recognized when the standardized emissions test was being done, and adjusted the engine to emit less pollutants during the test in order to pass regulatory benchmarks. The cars emitted much higher levels of pollution under real-world driving conditions. Some cars' emissions were higher even though there was no manipulated software.

Scandals relating to higher-than-reported emissions from diesel engines began in 2014 when the International Council on Clean Transportation (ICCT) reported discrepancies between European and US models of vehicles. This began with the Volkswagen emissions scandal. Independent tests carried out by the German car club ADAC proved that, under normal driving conditions, diesel vehicles including the Volvo S60, Renault's Espace Energy and the Jeep Renegade, exceeded legal European emission limits for nitrogen oxide (NO_{x}) by more than 10 times. ICCT and ADAC showed the biggest deviations from Volvo, Renault, Jeep, Hyundai, Citroën, and Fiat.

Researchers have criticized the inadequacy of current regulations and called for the use of a UN-sanctioned test called Worldwide harmonized Light vehicles Test Procedures that better reflects real-life driving conditions. The test only came into force in 2017, with critics saying that car firms lobbied fiercely to delay its implementation due to the high cost of meeting stricter environmental controls.

Conservative Internal Market spokesman Daniel Dalton, who led the legislation through the European Parliament, described the previous regulations as "at best patchy and at worst ineffective". He further said that his latest 2018 report introduced a strong and transparent system to ensure cars are safe and meet emissions standards. Since 2016, 38 out of 40 diesel cars tested by ADAC failed a NO_{x}-test.

== Background ==
Early in the 1950s, scientists discovered that vehicle emissions were a significant factor that had been causing the air quality to deteriorate. This led to the introduction of vehicle emissions standards in California in 1966, furthermore due to the seriousness of the problem, in 1970 the Clean Air Act was introduced in order to regulate these standards all over the United States. Eventually, other countries including European Nations, Australia, Japan and India followed suit. The United States as well as the other countries who followed were quick to act since vehicle emissions became a public health risk. The introduction of these emission standards produced satisfying results, from 1975 to 1996 carbon emissions dropped 76.3% of the initial levels in 1975. Correspondingly, studies estimate that the introduction of these policies averted 19,008 deaths from 1975 to 1996.

== Manufacturers ==
=== Volkswagen ===
The Volkswagen emissions scandal started on 18 September 2015, when the United States Environmental Protection Agency (EPA) issued a notice of violation of the Clean Air Act to German automaker Volkswagen Group. Volkswagen had intentionally programmed turbocharged direct injection (TDI) diesel engines to activate emissions controls only during emissions testing. In January 2017, VW pleaded guilty to the emissions scandal and agreed to pay US$4.3 billion in penalties. As of January 2019, 13 VW employees have been indicted, including former CEO Martin Winterkorn. In addition, two former executives (Oliver Schmidt and James Robert Liang) have pleaded guilty in US court and sentenced to prison terms.

The 2015 scandal was likely caused by the increasingly strict standards set, paired with the lack of technology to meet these requirements. Moreover, another possible reason for this scandal outbreak is cost. In order for automakers to comply with these standards, they must spend from $800 up to $3,000 more per vehicle. Volkswagen confessed that they could not comply with the policies in the amount of time they had when the standards became more strict in 2005. After much analysis of the Volkswagen company, the rigging was allowed for so long due to failing internal policies.

==== Audi and Porsche ====
In July 2019, Deutsche Umwelthilfe (DUH) (German Environmental Aid) published a press release in which it states that Porsche-vehicles equipped with Audi-diesel-engines of the Euro 5 and Euro 6 emission standards exceed the limit values for nitrogen oxides (NO_{x}) many times over.

The statutory NO_{x} limit for diesel passenger cars Euro 5 is 180 mg NO_{x}/km. The Porsche Panamera equipped with the VW-EA897 engine, made by Audi, exhibited an 8.3-fold limit violation with an average NO_{x} emissions of 1,498 mg/km, according to DUH. According to DUH data, the measurements were made at outside temperatures between +10 and +14 °C. Two Porsche Cayenne with the EA897evo engine (Euro 6) are said to have exceeded the applicable limit of 80 mg/km NO_{x} in normal mode by 3.6 or 4.2 times. Limits exceeding by the Cayenne in normal mode increases according to DUH in sport mode with the same driving style by two times. Also the arranged software update by the Federal Motor Transport Authority (Kraftfahrt-Bundesamt) does not prevent exceeding the limit. A tested Porsche Cayenne, emission standard Euro 6, exceeds the limit by 2.4 times at +10 to +16 °C with an average of 191 mg NO_{x}/km after the software update. In addition, the vehicle with a carbon dioxide emissions of 179 g CO_{2}/km is permitted, but in real operation on the road, according to DUH, the emissions are on average 241 g CO_{2}/km. In addition to the diesel passenger car Audi A8 4.2 TDI with emission standard Euro 6, which according to own data was measured on average 1,422 mg NO_{x}/km, also showed further new measurements on Audi Models High NO_{x} Limit Exceedances. An examined Audi SQ5 plus 3.0 TDI with emission standard Euro 6, with the same engine generation (EA897evo) as the Porsche Cayenne, emits an average of 441 mg NO_{x}/ km at outside temperatures between +4 and +11 °C. The measurements were carried out by the DUH according to the press release on the road using PEMS.

Initiated by the measurements, the DUH called on the manufacturers to publish a complete overview of all installed defeat devices for every diesel vehicle and to commit themselves to repair the diesel exhaust gas cleaning for all affected diesel buyers to help a legally compliant vehicle – or to reimburse them the full purchase price. It also announced that it will make the measurements results available to law enforcement agencies, the European Antitrust Authority and all concerned stakeholders and their lawyers. At the same time the DUH renewed their criticism of the Federal Motor Transport Authority and of Andreas Scheuer (Head of Federal Ministry of Transport and Digital Infrastructure), who according to the DUH-President on the one hand restraint documents about the detected defeat devices in the vehicles, despite final convictions for disclosure, and secondly prevent officially ordered hardware retrofits.

==== IAV ====
IAV GmbH paid a $35 million fine in the US.

=== Daimler ===
==== Mercedes-Benz ====
Even though up to 2018 there were increasingly specific allegations of defeat devices in the control software for Mercedes-Benz U.S. cars, Mercedes-Benz denies the charges. As of June 24, 2019 Daimler insisted its diesels didn't break the law. European vehicle emissions rules were loosely written. Turning down or switching off emission controls to protect the engine in certain circumstances – such as lower temperatures – was allowed. Earlier, Feb 2018, German newspaper Bild am Sonntag reported that US authorities investigating Mercedes have discovered that its vehicles are equipped with illegal software to help them pass United States' stringent emission tests. The claimed defeat devices include a Bit 15 mode to switch off emissions control after 16 miles of driving (the length of an official U.S. emissions test), and Slipguard which tries to directly determine if the car is being tested based on speed and acceleration profiles.

In June 2019, Daimler recalled 60,000 Mercedes diesel powered cars in Germany, the model affected is the Mercedes-Benz GLK 220 SUV produced between 2012 and 2015, car is fitted with software aimed at distorting emissions tests. Germany's vehicle authority, the Federal Motor Transport Authority is looking to extend investigations of cheating devices reportedly used in Daimler's C-Class and E-Class OM642 and OM651 engines. The number could be as high as 700,000 vehicles. In September 2019, Daimler was fined 870 million euros in Germany for "negligent violation of supervisory duties" in relation to not fully complying with emissions regulations. In 2022, Mercedes settled for $5.5 million in Arizona.

=== BMW ===
BMW was implicated in an "emissions cartel" which sought to restrict design standards for AdBlue. They were fined €875m along with VW in July 2021. In 2018 BMW recalled 11,700 cars which had incorrect emissions software installed to some diesel cars. The company denied using defeat devices, as suggested by the KBA. BMW was sued in 2018 when certain models were named as producing several times more nitrogen oxide emissions than laboratory tests indicated. They were accused of colluding with Robert Bosch GmbH and LLC to produce defeat software to hide the cars' true emissions.

=== Opel/Vauxhall (General Motors) ===
Opel, a German brand then owned by General Motors, was caught using a defeat device in Europe in 2015. The engine software changed the engine behavior based on whether two or four wheels were rotating. In an Opel Zafira front-wheel-drive vehicle, the NO_{x} emissions were within the 80 mg/km legal limit – but only when the vehicle was on a test stand, with the front wheels rotating and the rear wheels being stationary. When the rear unpowered wheels were made to rotate too (which is how a front-wheel-drive vehicle behaves on the road), the NO_{x} emission were twice the limit (cold engine) or three to four times the limit (warmed-up engine). In January 2016, the Economic Inspectorate opened an investigation into the suspicious reductions in emissions levels of the Opel Zafira models. Ten Opel dealerships were raided by the authorities.

Opel Zafira NO_{x} emissions, mg/km (all tests performed on the same car)

Despite the facts, Opel denied using defeat devices, called the tests "untrustworthy" and "incomprehensible", and one of the scientists involved in testing the car and discovering the discrepancy, Professor Jan Czerwinski from the Bern University of Applied Sciences, was pressured into issuing a statement to a news agency saying that "the facts could be distorted, incomplete or tendentious for various reasons". That was despite those tests being done according to the established and undemanding NEDC procedure. Opel publicly demonstrated (while representatives from the TÜV Hessen were present) a Zafira that met the NO_{x} emission limits. At the same time, Opel started clandestinely pushing an engine software update that limited NO_{x} emissions in Zafiras that were already on the road, and was caught doing so by Belgian journalists from the VRT news station. The software update dramatically lowered NO_{x} emissions in the cars, and was installed in customers' cars during service center visits without their knowing. Opel also reportedly tried to conceal the high emissions of the Opel Zafira Tourer models. FEBIAC, the Belgian and Luxembourg car federation, issued a denial in regards to the Zafira model, while the opposition Groen party criticized the inaction of the Flemish and Belgian federal governments. Vooruit MP Bruno Tobback demanded an explanation from Environment Minister Joke Schauvliege of Christian Democratic and Flemish. In 2021, Opel paid a 64.8 million euro fine in Germany.

=== Fiat Chrysler ===
On 12 January 2017, the EPA issued a notice of violation to Fiat Chrysler Automobiles (FCA) alleging that over 100,000 model year 2014, 2015, and 2016 diesel SUVs and trucks, including Dodge Ram 1500 and Jeep Grand Cherokee trucks, had software that allowed them to exceed NO_{x} pollution limits, undetected by the usual testing methods. The EPA discovered this during their expanded vehicle tests following the Volkswagen case. FCA was not accused of intentionally cheating on emissions testing, though the EPA did accuse the company of failing to notify the government of the defeat device programming. The US Justice Department was assisting the EPA in their investigation, suggesting the possibility of criminal charges. This is all while FCA executives were hopeful that after the inauguration of President Donald Trump it would be possible to "work with the new administration to try and get this issue behind us" according to FCA CEO Sergio Marchionne. Executives denied any wrongdoing but started to make extensive changes to their vehicle software to address the EPA's concerns.

As part of a January 2019 settlement, Fiat Chrysler recalled and repaired approximately 100,000 automobiles equipped with a 3.0-litre V6 EcoDiesel engine having a prohibited defeat device, pay $311 million in total civil penalties to US regulators and CARB, pay $72.5 million for state civil penalties, implement corporate governance reforms, and pay $33.5 million to mitigate excess pollution. The company will also pay affected consumers up to $280 million and offer extended warranties on such vehicles worth $105 million. The total value of the settlement is worth about $800 million, though FCA did not admit liability, and it did not resolve an ongoing criminal investigation.

In October 2020, Fiat Chrysler faced a £5 billion class-action lawsuit in the UK due to over half a million Fiat, Alfa Romeo, Jeep, Iveco, and Suzuki vehicles having these defeat devices. In connection with the mentioned software, Emanuele Palma, a diesel drivability and emissions senior manager at Fiat Chrysler, was charged with one count of conspiracy to defraud the United States, to violate the Clean Air Act and to commit wire fraud. Palma was also charged with six counts of violating the Clean Air Act, four counts of wire fraud and two counts of making false statements to representatives of the FBI and the EPA's Criminal Investigation Division (EPA-CID). On 3 March 2021, Sergio Pasini and Gianluca Sabbioni, two Italian nationals and alleged co-conspirators of Palma, were indicted. In 2022, FCA US, formerly Chrysler Group, pleaded guilty to one count of conspiracy to defraud the US, commit wire fraud, and to violate the Clean Air Act.

==== Jeep ====
Jeep, also manufactured by Fiat Chrysler Automobiles, was tested by the consumer group Which? and in March 2017 found to produce 1.74 g/km NO_{x} compared to the 2009 European emission standards Euro 5 legal limit of 0.18 g/km. High level of pollutants were emitted by Jeep Grand Cherokee when its engine was hot.

==== Ram ====
In December 2023, Cummins was fined $1.675 billion by the US Justice Department for violations of the Clean Air Act. Cummins was found to have installed devices designed to bypass or disable emissions controls on 960,000 Dodge and Stellantis RAM pickup truck diesel engines between 2013 and 2023. It will also pay $325 million in remedies and recalls.

=== Renault ===
Renault issued press statements reaffirming their vehicles' compliance with all regulations and legislation for the markets in which they operate in 2015. Headquarters of Renault and Peugeot were raided by fraud investigators in January and April 2016, respectively. Renault subsequently recalled 15,000 cars for emission testing and fixing.

Since 2015, Renault has been investigated by the French Direction générale de la concurrence, de la consommation et de la répression des fraudes (DGCCRF). Their 2017 report states "the suspicion of the installation of a 'fraudulent device' which specifically modifies the functioning of the engine to reduce emissions of NO_{x} (nitrogen oxides) in conditions specific to the regulatory tests." It affects 900,000 vehicles. Renault Captur and Clio IV exceeded the threshold for carbon dioxide emissions by 377% and 305%.

In 2019, Renault's Clio and Captur diesel models were found to emit more pollutants outside of official test conditions, their exhaust treatment did not work in everyday use when the outside temperature range was below or above those covering official tests. Furthermore, their "NO_{x} trap" devices did not run cleaning cycles below 50 kilometres per hour (31 mph), causing those filters to clog and become ineffective.

=== Nissan ===
In September 2015 Renault-Nissan CEO Carlos Ghosn said it would be difficult for an automaker to conceal internally an effort to falsify vehicle emissions data, as happened at Volkswagen AG: "I don't think you can do something like this hiding in the bushes." In May 2016, South Korean authorities accused Nissan of using a defeat device for manipulating emissions data for the British-built Nissan Qashqai, allegations which the Japanese carmaker denied. In March 2017, Nissan vehicles tested by Which? were found to produce 0.81 g/km NO_{x} compared to the 2009 European emission standards Euro 5 legal limit of 0.18 g/km.

=== Toyota ===
A class-action lawsuit was filed against Toyota in 2019 in Australia, alleging that a total of 264,170 Toyota vehicles sold in the country had been fitted with defective diesel particulate filters. In April 2022, the Federal Court of Australia found that the diesel particulate filters in these vehicles were not of acceptable quality and that Toyota had engaged in "misleading or deceptive conduct" in marketing and selling the affected vehicles. After appeal, the Federal Court upheld its ruling in 2023.

In 2022, a class-action lawsuit was launched against Toyota Australia, claiming that up to 500,000 Toyota vehicles sold in Australia since February 2016 contained emissions defeat devices. In January 2024, Toyota temporarily suspended shipments of over 10 vehicle models after discovering irregularities for certification tests for a number of its diesel engines. Production vehicles had used different electronic control units than those used during horsepower testing. The company stated it had sold about 84,000 vehicles with the affected engines during 2023, but did not disclose total lifetime sales of the affected vehicles.

=== Mitsubishi ===
In 2021, Mitsubishi paid a 25 million euro fine in Germany.

=== Bosch ===
In 2019, Bosch paid a 90 million euro fine in Germany. In 2022, Bosch paid a $25 million fine in California. In 2022, Bosch settled for $525,000 in Arizona.

=== ZF Friedrichshafen ===
In 2020, ZF Friedrichshafen paid a 42.5 million euro fine in Germany.

=== Cummins ===
In December 2023, Cummins was fined $1.675 billion by the US Justice Department for violations of the Clean Air Act. Cummins was found to have installed devices designed to bypass or disable emissions controls on 960,000 Dodge and Stellantis RAM pickup truck diesel engines between 2013 and 2023. It will also pay $325 million in remedies and recalls.

== Previous defeat device cases ==
The Volkswagen TDI diesel emissions case is not the first use of defeat devices by Volkswagen or other automakers nor the first time automakers have taken advantage of their foreknowledge of the specific lab test conditions in order to engage emissions controls only during testing, but not during normal driving. In 1973, Chrysler, Ford, General Motors, Toyota, and Volkswagen had to remove ambient temperature switches which affected emissions, though the companies denied intentional cheating and said that strategies like enriching fuel mixture during cold engine warm-up periods could reduce overall pollution. The switches were ordered to be removed from production but cars already on the road did not have to be recalled, and fines were relatively modest.

In 1996, GM had to pay a near-record fine of $11 million, and recall 470,000 vehicles, because of ECU software programmed to disengage emissions controls during conditions known to exist when the cars were not being lab tested by the EPA. The model year 1991–1995 Cadillacs were programmed to simply enrich the engine's fuel mixture, increasing carbon monoxide (CO) and unburned hydrocarbon (HC) pollution, any time the car's air conditioning or heater was turned on, since the testing protocol specified they would be off.

In 1996, Fiat of Brazil paid a record fine because of the Fiat Mille Electronic, a very popular version of the Fiat Uno with a 1.0-litre engine. They sold 500,000 vehicles with a combination of carburettor and digital ignition that uses different strategies for laboratory or street driving conditions. In 1998, Honda Motor Company had to spend $267 million to correct the disabling of the misfire monitoring device on 1.6 million 1996 and 1997 model year vehicles, and Ford Motor Company paid $7.8 million for programming 60,000 1997 Ford Econoline vans to exceed emissions standards during normal highway cruising speeds.

A timer-based strategy was used by seven heavy truck manufacturers, Caterpillar Inc., Cummins Engine Company, Detroit Diesel Corporation, Mack Trucks, Navistar International, Renault Véhicules Industriels, and Volvo Trucks, who in 1998 paid the largest ever fine to date, $83.4 million, for, in the same manner as Volkswagen, programming trucks to keep NO_{x} emissions low during the test cycle, and then disabling the controls and emitting up to three times the maximum during normal highway driving. The goal of both the Ford and the heavy truck defeat devices was better fuel economy than could be achieved under pollution limits. The major truck manufacturers also had to spend up to $1 billion to correct the problem, which affected 1.3 million heavy duty diesel trucks. While Volkswagen's actions have precedents, the Center for Auto Safety's Clarence Ditlow said that Volkswagen "took it to another level of sophisticated deception we've never seen before."

== EU vehicle approval procedures ==
In May 2017, the 28 EU member states agreed to begin negotiations with EU institutions to revise the method of testing vehicle emissions towards real circumstances, with random testing of vehicles on the roads and fines for manufacturers who breach the rules. Eben Moglen suggested in 2010 to make proprietary software source code in general accessible to the public, to curb cheating.

== See also ==
- Business action on climate change
- Diesel particulate filter
- Diesel exhaust fluid
- ExxonMobil climate change controversy
- Greenwashing
- NOx adsorber – a system to trap oxides of nitrogen used by Volkswagen "Clean Diesel" cars
