= F650 =

F650 may refer to:

- Ford F-650, a medium duty truck
- BMW F650 single, a former BMW motorcycle
