= BMW F650GS =

The BMW F650GS may refer to either of the following:

- BMW F series single-cylinder, a single-cylinder 650 cc motorcycle produced from 2000 to 2007, reintroduced as the G650GS in 2008.
- BMW F series parallel-twin, a twin-cylinder 800 cc motorcycle produced from 2007 until 2012.
