= Suzuki XF 650 Freewind =

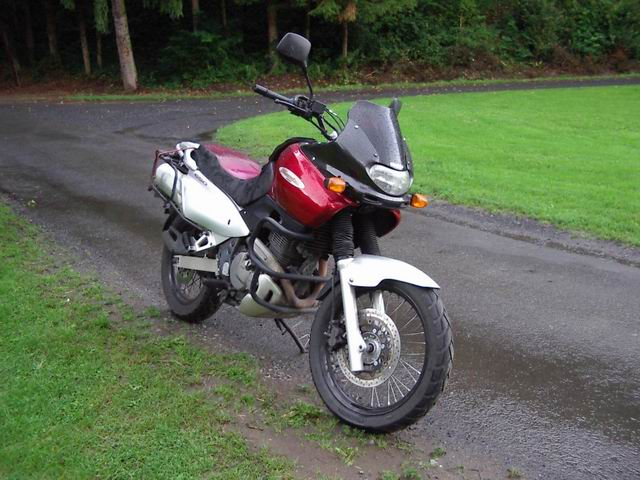
- Manufacturer: Suzuki
- Production: 1997-2002
- Assembly: Japan
- Predecessor: Suzuki DR650
- Successor: Suzuki V-Strom 650
- Engine: 644 cc (39.3 cu in), 4-stroke, SOHC, 4-valve, air/oil cooled, single
- Bore / stroke: 100 mm × 82 mm (3.9 in × 3.2 in)
- Transmission: 5-speed
- Suspension: Telescopic fork, link type swingarm
- Tires: F: 100/90 19 57H; R: 130/80 R17 65H
- Dimensions: L: 2,205 mm (86.8 in)

The Suzuki XF 650 Freewind, also called Freewind XF650, is a 644 cc (39.3 cu in) single-cylinder dual-sport motorcycle made by Suzuki from 1997 to 2002.

== History and development ==
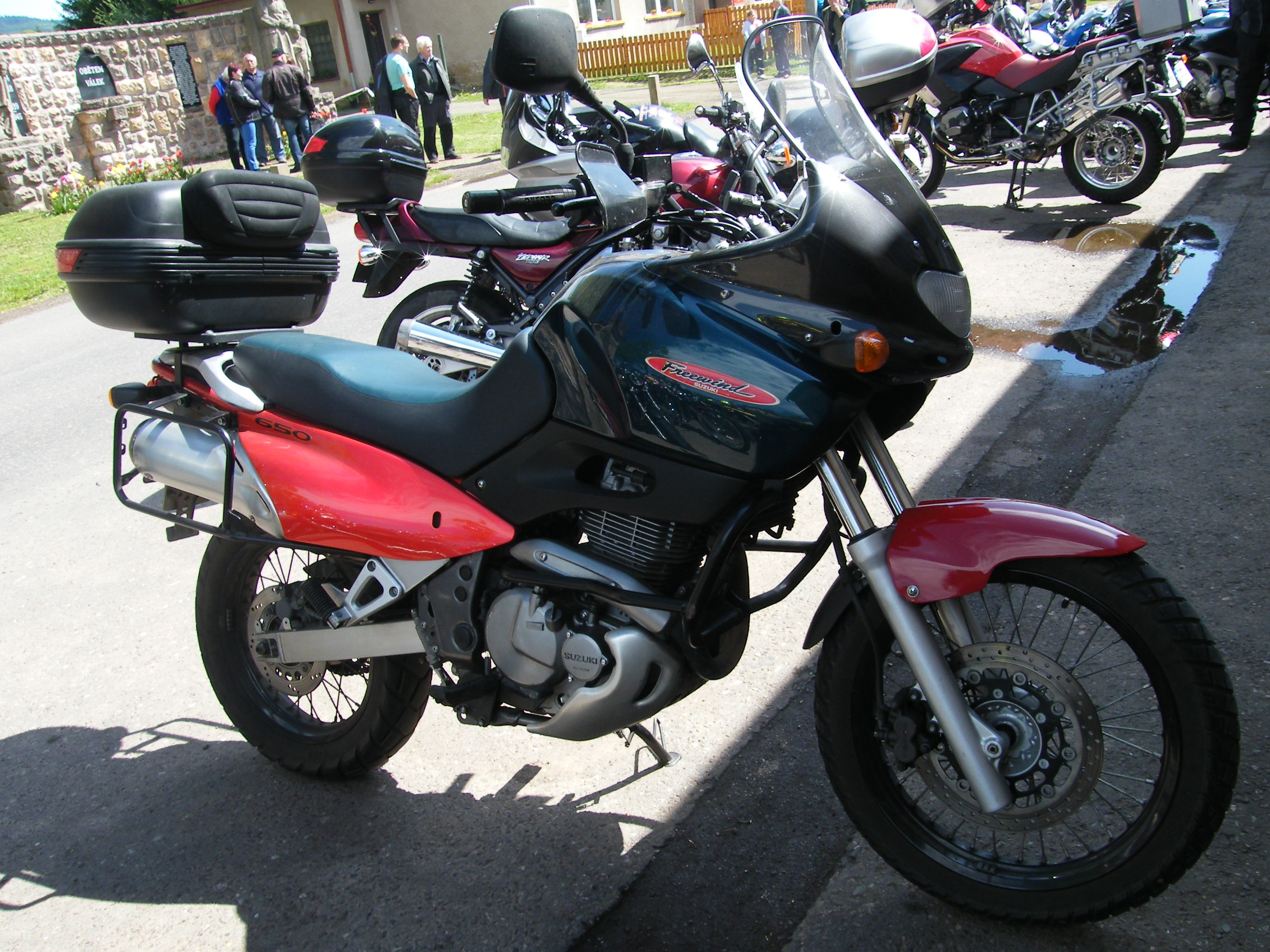

Introduced at the end of 1996, the bike uses an air/oil-cooled single-cylinder four-stroke engine available in the only displacement of 644 cm^{3}. The engine is powered by Mikuni BSR32 Ø 32 carburettors assisted by a transistor electronic ignition system with 2 "twin spark" spark plugs, with SOHC distribution with 4 chain-operated valves per cylinder and equipped with a balancing shaft with wet sump lubrication.

Primary transmission is via gears and a mechanically operated wet multi-plate clutch, assisted by a five-speed gearbox. Power is transmitted to the rear wheel via chain.

The frame is of the double cradle type in steel with a square section. The front telescopic fork has a travel of 170mm. The rear suspension consists of a steel section swingarm with a travel of 167 mm.

The instrument panel consists of a multifunction digital display which shows the speedometer, tachometer with bar graph and the fuel gauge.
