= Jeanneau Yachts 53 =

Sailboat class

Development
- Designer: Philippe Briand
- Location: France
- Year: 2008
- Builder: Jeanneau
- Role: Cruiser
- Name: Jeanneau Yachts 53

Boat
- Displacement: 32,926 lb (14,935 kg)
- Draft: 7.48 ft (2.28 m)

Hull
- Type: monohull
- Construction: fiberglass
- LOA: 52.69 ft (16.06 m)
- LWL: 45.80 ft (13.96 m)
- Beam: 15.65 ft (4.77 m)
- Engine: Yanmar 4JH4-HTE 110 hp (82 kW) diesel engine

Hull appendages
- Keel: fin keel with weighted bulb
- Ballast: 10,990 lb (4,985 kg)
- Rudder: spade-type rudder

Rig
- Rig type: Bermuda rig
- I foretriangle height: 62.34 ft (19.00 m)
- J foretriangle base: 20.44 ft (6.23 m)
- P mainsail luff: 57.41 ft (17.50 m)
- E mainsail foot: 19.68 ft (6.00 m)

Sails
- Sailplan: fractional rigged sloop
- Mainsail area: 564.91 sq ft (52.482 m^{2})
- Jib/genoa area: 637.11 sq ft (59.189 m^{2})
- Total sail area: 1,202.03 sq ft (111.672 m^{2})

The Jeanneau Yachts 53, or Jeanneau 53, is a French sailboat that was designed by Philippe Briand as a cruiser and first built in 2008. It was also sold as the Sunsail 53.

The design replaced the 2004 Sun Odyssey 54 DS in the company product line.

== Production ==
The design was built by Jeanneau in France, starting in 2008, but it is now out of production.

== Design ==
The Jeanneau Yachts 53 is a recreational keelboat, built predominantly of fiberglass, with wood trim. The deck has balsa panels for a core and is injection-molded. It has a fractional sloop rig, a nearly-plumb stem, a reverse transom with steps and a swimming platform, an internally mounted spade-type rudder controlled by dual wheels and a fixed fin keel or optional shoal-draft keel. It displaces 32,926 lb (14,935 kg) and carries 10,990 lb (4,985 kg) of cast iron ballast or 11,852 lb (5,376 kg) of ballast in the shoal draft model.

A tall rig "performance" version was also built, with a mast about 5 ft (1.5 m) taller.

The boat has a draft of 7.48 ft (2.28 m) with the standard keel and 5.83 ft (1.78 m) with the optional shoal draft keel.

The boat is fitted with a Japanese Yanmar 4JH4-HTE diesel engine of 110 hp (82 kW) for docking and maneuvering. The fuel tank holds 63 U.S. gallons (240 L; 52 imp gal) and the fresh water tank has a capacity of 251 U.S. gallons (950 L; 209 imp gal).

The design was available with several different interior arrangements, with two, three and four cabins. Depending on the number of cabins it has sleeping accommodation for four to eight people. Both the bow and stern may have one or two cabins, each with a double berth. The main salon has a U-shaped settee and a straight settee. The galley is located on the port side just forward of the companionway ladder and is J-shaped. A navigation station is opposite the galley, on the starboard side. Two to four heads may be installed, normally one for each cabin fitted. There is a large sail locker in the bow which can also be used as a crew cabin.

The design has a hull speed of 9.07 kn (16.80 km/h).

== Operational history ==
In a 2010 review for Cruising World, Bill Springer wrote, "I think Jeanneau is on to something with its new line of yachts. The 53 is spacious, stylish, and sails well. The 57 has even more elbowroom, more sophisticated systems, larger battery capacity, and the dinghy “garage,” but both boats are designed to do the same thing: provide all the luxury of a big boat without the relatively big big-boat price tag."

In a 2017 review for Sail Magazine, Charles Doane wrote, "We sailed the 53 in open water off Miami Beach in 10-12 knots of wind. Our boat was equipped with an in-mast furling mainsail with no battens and a 125 percent genoa. Given the less-than-optimal main (in terms of performance) and the lack of proper downwind sails, I was pleasantly surprised by how well we did. We made our best speed to windward, about 6.5 knots, close-hauled at an apparent wind angle of about 40 degrees. Pinching a bit we could maintain 5.4 knots at an angle of 35 degrees. On a broad reach we hit 5.3 knots in spite of the reduced apparent wind."

== See also ==
- List of sailing boat types
