= Jeanneau Yachts 57 =

Sailboat class

Development
- Designer: Philippe Briand; Vittorio Garroni; Jeanneau Design Office
- Location: France
- Year: 2009
- Builder: Jeanneau
- Role: Cruiser
- Name: Jeanneau Yachts 57

Boat
- Displacement: 59,810 lb (27,129 kg)
- Draft: 6.83 ft (2.08 m)

Hull
- Type: monohull
- Construction: fiberglass
- LOA: 58.33 ft (17.78 m)
- LWL: 50.33 ft (15.34 m)
- Beam: 16.33 ft (4.98 m)
- Engine: VW Marine TDI 140-5 140 hp (104 kW) diesel engine

Hull appendages
- Keel: fin keel
- Ballast: 13,448 lb (6,100 kg)
- Rudder: spade-type rudder

Rig
- Rig type: Bermuda rig
- I foretriangle height: 68.83 ft (20.98 m)
- J foretriangle base: 21.83 ft (6.65 m)
- P mainsail luff: 64.25 ft (19.58 m)
- E mainsail foot: 20.92 ft (6.38 m)

Sails
- Sailplan: fractional rigged sloop
- Mainsail area: 947 sq ft (88.0 m^{2})
- Jib/genoa area: 624 sq ft (58.0 m^{2})
- Spinnaker area: 2,368 sq ft (220.0 m^{2})
- Gennaker area: 2,174 sq ft (202.0 m^{2})
- Upwind sail area: 1,572 sq ft (146.0 m^{2})
- Downwind sail area: 3,315 sq ft (308.0 m^{2})

The Jeanneau Yachts 57 also called the Jeanneau 57, is a French blue water cruising sailboat with a hull designed by Philippe Briand, styling and interior by Vittorio Garroni and the Jeanneau Design Office. It was first built in 2009.

== Production ==
The design was built by Jeanneau in France, from 2009 to 2015, but it is now out of production.

== Design ==
The Jeanneau Yachts 57 is a recreational keelboat, built predominantly of polyester fiberglass, with wood trim. The hull is made from solid fiberglass and the deck from a fiberglass-balsa sandwich. It has a fractional sloop rig, with a keel-stepped mast, three sets of swept spreaders and aluminum spars with discontinuous Dyform rigging. The hull has a nearly-plumb stem, a reverse transom with steps and a swimming platform, an internally mounted spade-type rudder controlled by dual wheels and a fixed fin keel with a weighted bulb or optional deep-draft keel. The fin keel model displaces 48,171 lb (21,850 kg) empty and carries 14,330 lb (6,500 kg) of cast iron ballast, while the deep draft version displaces 47,289 lb (21,450 kg) empty and carries 13,448 lb (6,100 kg) of cast iron ballast.

The boat has a draft of 6.83 ft (2.08 m) with the standard keel and 8.16 ft (2.49 m) with the optional deep draft keel.

The boat is fitted with a German VW Marine TDI 140-5 140 hp (104 kW) fuel-injected diesel engine or a Swedish Volvo D3-150 CV 140 hp (104 kW) diesel engine for docking and maneuvering. The fuel tank holds 111 U.S. gallons (420 L; 92 imp gal) and the fresh water tank has a capacity of 246 U.S. gallons (930 L; 205 imp gal).

The design has several different interior arrangements, with sleeping accommodation for five to nine people. A typical three-cabin configuration has a double berth forward, plus a single berth in the very bow, a U-shaped settee and a straight settee in the main cabin and an aft cabin with a double berth. The galley is located on the port side just forward of the companionway ladder. The galley is J-shaped and is equipped with a stove, an refrigerator and a double sink. A navigation station is opposite the galley, on the starboard side. This three cabin configuration includes three heads, one for each cabin, but up to four heads may be fitted. Cabin maximum headroom is 80 in (203 cm).

For sailing downwind the design may be equipped with a symmetrical spinnaker of 2,368 sq ft (220.0 m^{2}) or an asymmetrical spinnaker of 2,174 sq ft (202.0 m^{2}).

The design has a hull speed of 9.49 kn (17.58 km/h).

== Operational history ==
In a 2010 review for Cruising World, Bill Springer wrote, "I think Jeanneau is on to something with its new line of yachts. The 53 is spacious, stylish, and sails well. The 57 has even more elbowroom, more sophisticated systems, larger battery capacity, and the dinghy “garage,” but both boats are designed to do the same thing: provide all the luxury of a big boat without the relatively big big-boat price tag."

== See also ==
- List of sailing boat types
