= Sun Odyssey 54 DS =

Sailboat class

Development
- Designer: Jacques Fauroux; Vittorio Garroni; Jeanneau Design Office
- Location: France
- Year: 2004
- Builder: Jeanneau
- Role: Cruiser
- Name: Sun Odyssey 54 DS

Boat
- Displacement: 37,479 lb (17,000 kg)
- Draft: 6.50 ft (1.98 m)

Hull
- Type: monohull
- Construction: fiberglass
- LOA: 54.92 ft (16.74 m)
- LWL: 48.50 ft (14.78 m)
- Beam: 15.92 ft (4.85 m)
- Engine: Yanmar 4JH4 HTE 100 hp (75 kW) turbocharged diesel engine

Hull appendages
- Keel: fin keel, with weighted bulb
- Ballast: 11,023 lb (5,000 kg)
- Rudder: spade-type rudder

Rig
- Rig type: Bermuda rig
- I foretriangle height: 66.08 ft (20.14 m)
- J foretriangle base: 19.35 ft (5.90 m)
- P mainsail luff: 59.92 ft (18.26 m)
- E mainsail foot: 19.19 ft (5.85 m)

Sails
- Sailplan: fractional rigged sloop masthead sloop
- Mainsail area: 574.93 sq ft (53.413 m^{2})
- Jib/genoa area: 639.32 sq ft (59.395 m^{2})
- Total sail area: 1,214.26 sq ft (112.808 m^{2})

Racing
- PHRF: 45-72

The Sun Odyssey 54 DS (Deck Salon) is a French cruising sailboat, with the hull designed by Jacques Fauroux, the Jeanneau Design Office providing finishing and Vittorio Garroni the styling. Work was commenced in 2002 and production started in 2004.

For the yacht charter business the design was sold as Moorings 54 and the Moorings 554 with different cabin configurations.

The design was replaced in the company line in 2008 by the Jeanneau Yachts 53.

== Production ==
The design was built by Jeanneau in France, starting in 2004, but it is now out of production.

== Design ==
The Sun Odyssey 54 DS is a recreational keelboat, built predominantly of fiberglass with a wooden substructure and trim. The deck has a balsa core. It has a masthead sloop rig, with a keel-stepped mast, three sets of swept spreaders and aluminum spars with discontinuous stainless steel wire rigging. The hull has a nearly plumb stem, a reverse transom with steps and a swimming platform, an internally mounted spade-type rudder controlled by dual wheels and a fixed fin keel with a weighted bulb or optional deep-draft keel. The fin keel model displaces 37,479 lb (17,000 kg) and carries 11,905 lb (5,400 kg) of cast iron ballast, while the deep draft version carries 11,023 lb (5,000 kg) of ballast.

The boat has a draft of 6.50 ft (1.98 m) with the standard keel and 7.5 ft (2.3 m) with the optional deep draft keel.

The boat is fitted with a Japanese Yanmar 4JH4 HTE 100 hp (75 kW) turbocharged diesel engine for docking and maneuvering. The fuel tank holds 191 U.S. gallons (720 L; 159 imp gal) and the fresh water tank has a capacity of 246 U.S. gallons (930 L; 205 imp gal).

The design was built with a range of interiors, providing sleeping accommodation for seven to nine people. A typical layout has a double "V"-berth in the bow cabin, three bunks just aft of the bow, two U-shaped settees and a straight settee in the main cabin and an aft cabin with a double berth. Alternative arrangements provide up to four berths in the aft cabin. The galley is located on the port side at the companionway ladder. The galley is C-shaped and is equipped with a stove, a refrigerator and a double sink. A navigation station is opposite the galley, on the starboard side. There are four heads, two forward and two aft.

The design has a hull speed of 9.33 kn (17.28 km/h) and a PHRF handicap of 72 for the deep-draft keel and 45-72 for the fin keel.

== Operational history ==
In a 2004 review in Cruising World, John Kretschmer wrote, "Gusty southwest winds ranged from 12 to 21 knots as we unrolled the main and full genoa and shot off across the bay on a close reach. The acceleration was impressive as I watched the speedo arch past 7 and finally settle in at 8.3 knots. We were slightly overpowered with the 135-percent genoa, and the helm felt better when we shortened the headsail a tad. This is when you appreciate the load-bearing headsail leads. Hardening the sheets, we pinched up to inside 40 degrees apparent and kept the boat moving at more than 7 knots. The inboard shrouds allow for close sheeting angles. Even hard on the wind, the heeling was minimal, and there was no sign of pounding; of course, we were sailing in protected waters. The high freeboard contributes to the boat's dryness."

== See also ==
- List of sailing boat types
