= TDI (engine) =

Branded engine design

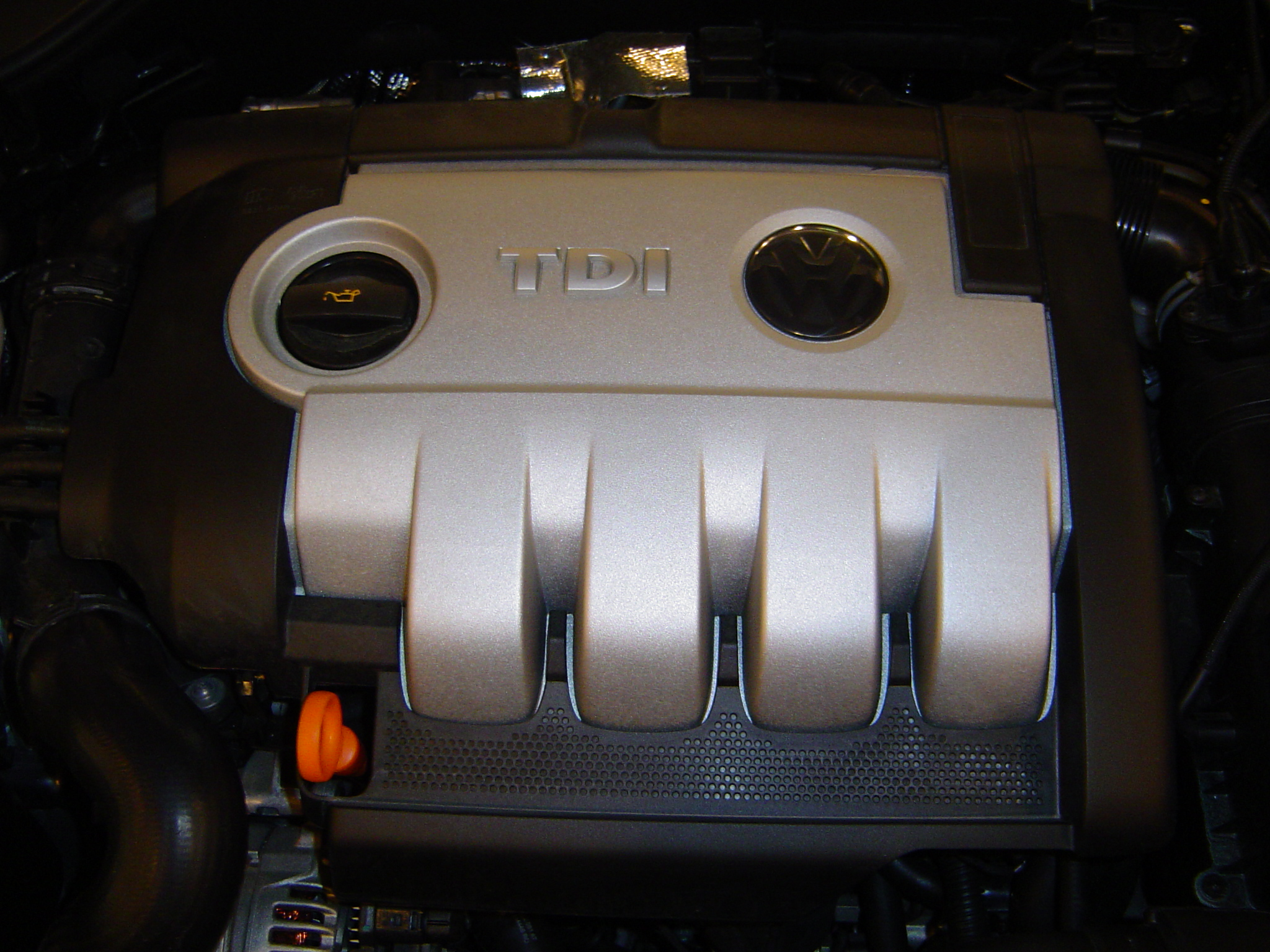
TDI lettering embossed on a Volkswagen engine cover

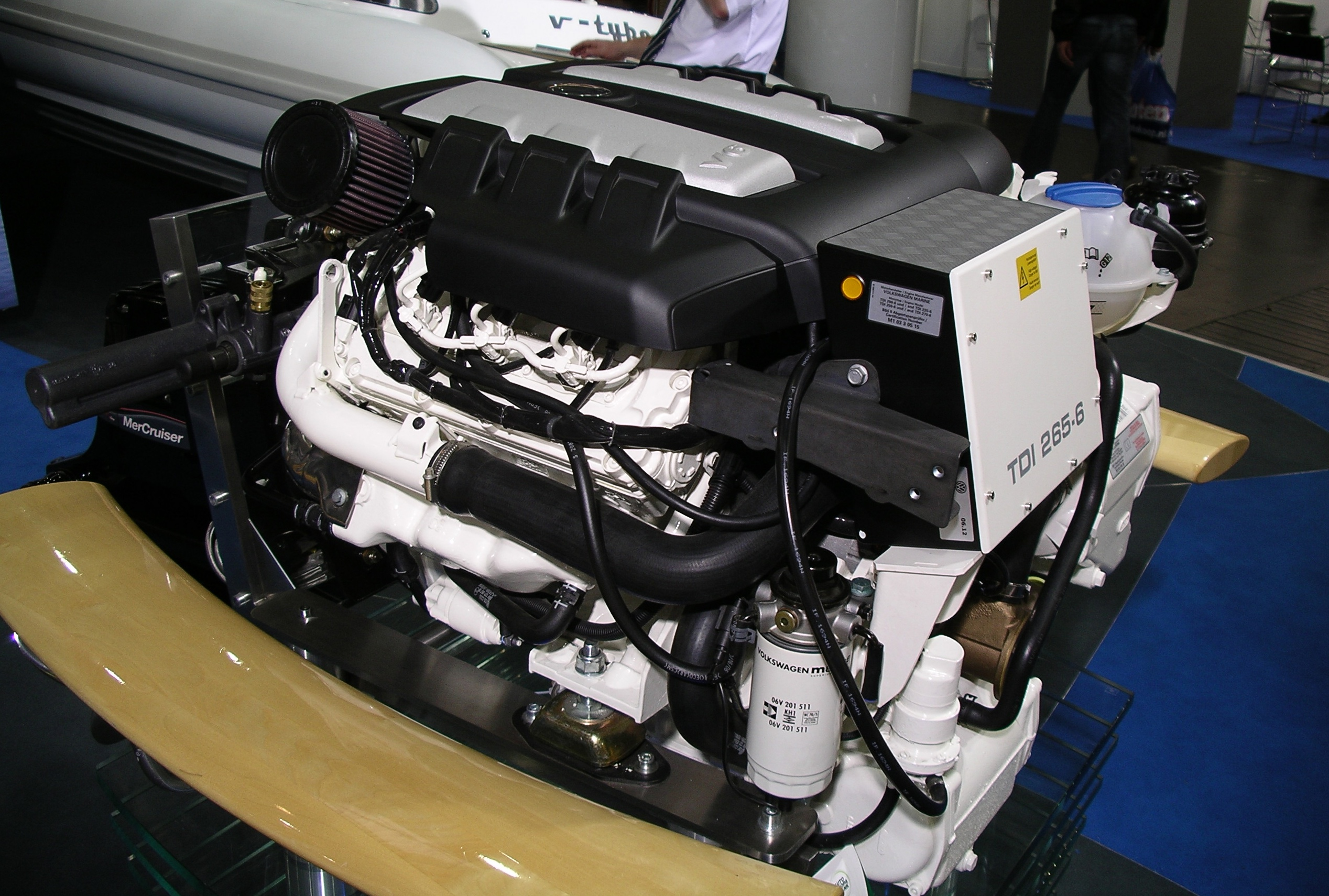
Volkswagen Marine 3.0-litre V6 TDI 265-6 engine

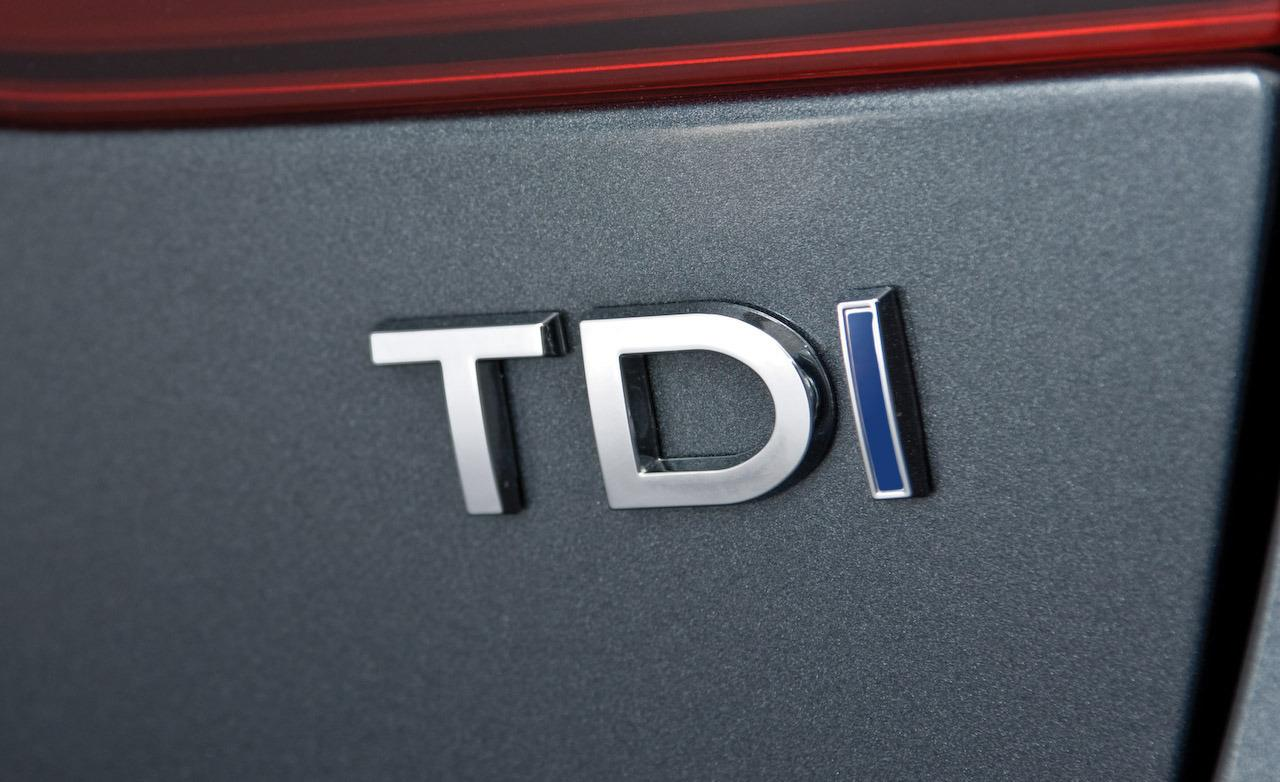
TDI emblem as used on TDI equipped vehicles

TDI (Turbocharged Direct Injection) was created under Ferdinand Piëch and is Volkswagen Group's term for its current common rail direct injection turbodiesel engine range that have an intercooler in addition to the turbo compressor. In the past the TDI nameplate was used for multiple different injection systems including the rotary pump style and Pumpe-Düse (PD) injection system. TDI engines are used in motor vehicles sold by the Audi, Volkswagen, SEAT, and Škoda marques, the Porsche Cayenne Diesel from 2008 to 2017, as well as in boat engines sold by Volkswagen Marine, and industrial engines sold by Volkswagen Industrial Motor.

The first TDI engine, a straight-five engine, was produced for the 1989 Audi 100 TDI sedan. In 1999, common rail fuel injection was introduced in the V8 engine used by the Audi A8 3.3 TDI Quattro. From 2006 until 2014, Audi successfully competed in the LMP1 category of motor racing using TDI engine-powered racing cars. TDI engines installed in 2009 to 2015 model year Volkswagen Group cars sold through 18 September 2015 had an emissions defeat device, which activated emissions controls only during emissions testing. The emissions controls were suppressed otherwise, allowing the TDI engines to exceed legal limits on emissions. Volkswagen has admitted to using the illegal device in its TDI diesel cars. As a result of the Dieselgate scandal, TDI engines are no longer sold in the United States or Canada.

== Overview ==
TDI is the combination of two existing diesel engine technologies:

- Direct injection – where a fuel injector sprays the diesel fuel directly into the main combustion chambers. This causes a more complete combustion process than using a pre-combustion chamber (known as indirect injection), which therefore increases the torque output and reduces the exhaust emissions.
- Turbocharging – where an exhaust-driven turbine compresses the intake air, in order to obtain higher power and torque outputs from a small displacement engine.

Most TDI engines also use an intercooler to lower the temperature (and therefore increase the density) of the compressed air before it enters the cylinder. Similar technology has been used by other automotive companies, but the "TDI" marketing term is only used by Volkswagen Group and Land Rover. Volkswagen Group uses the term SDI (which stands for "Suction Direct Injection") for its naturally aspirated (i.e. non-turbocharged) direct-injection diesel engines.

== History ==
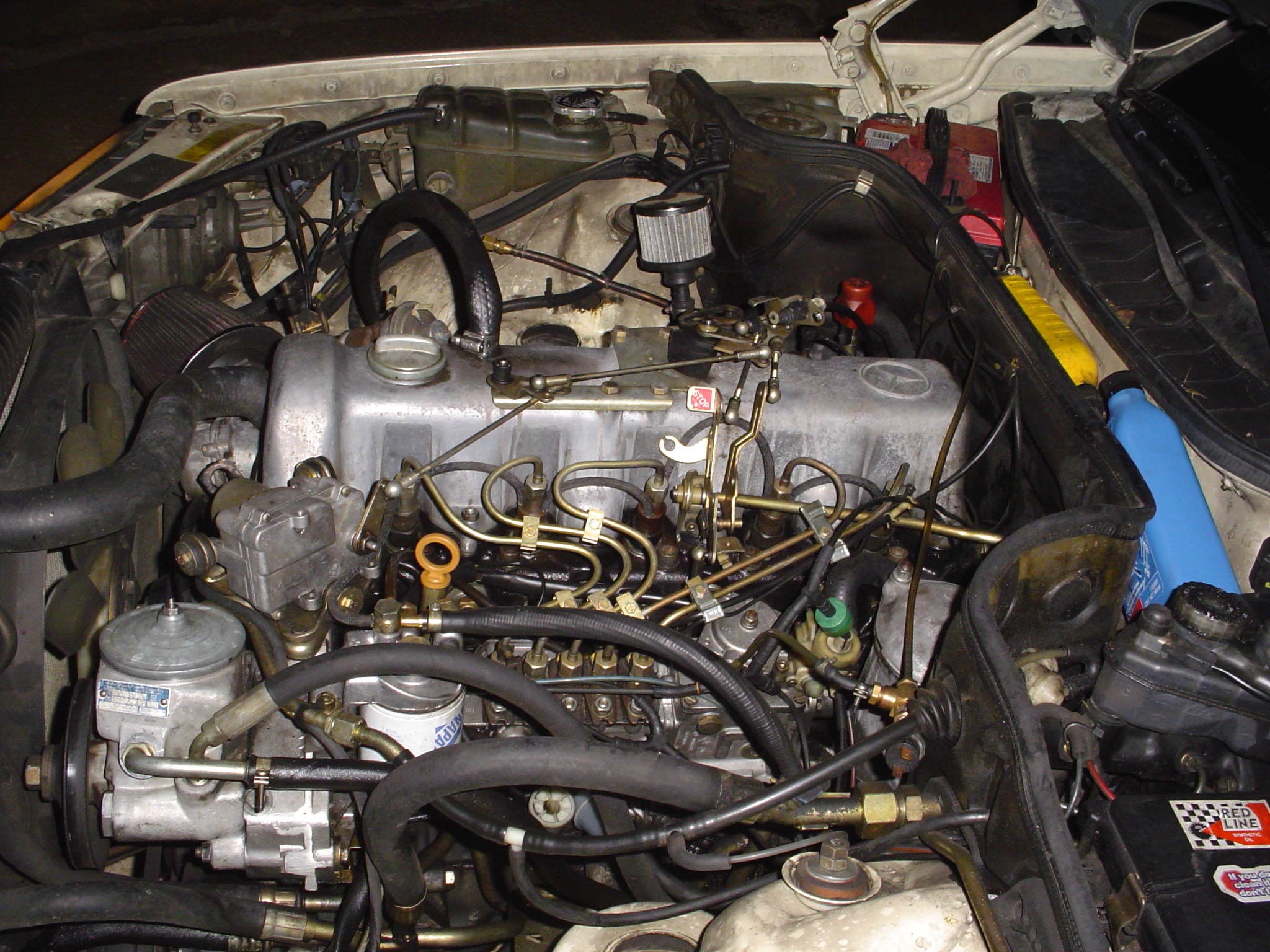
1978–1980 Mercedes-Benz OM617 indirect injection turbodiesel

Prior to Volkswagen Group's first TDI engine, the first turbocharged diesel engine used in a passenger car was an indirect injection five-cylinder engine fitted to the 1978 Mercedes-Benz 300SD (W116) 300 SD sedan. The first turbodiesel engine with direct injection was the 1986 Fiat Croma 2.0 TD i.d. liftback sedan.

Three years after the Fiat Croma, Volkswagen Group's first TDI engine was introduced in the 1989 Audi 100 TDI sedan. The Audi 100 was powered by the Volkswagen 2.5 R5 TDI straight-five engine which used an electronic distributor injection pump (called "VerteilerPumpe" by Volkswagen) and two-stage direct injection. The initial version of this engine generated 88 kW (118 hp) at 3,250 rpm and 275 N⋅m (203 lb⋅ft) at 2,500 rpm.

TDI engines using common rail fuel injection (using piezoelectric fuel injectors) were introduced with the Volkswagen Group 32v TDI V8 engine used in the 1999 Audi A8 3.3 TDI Quattro, two years after the 1997 Alfa Romeo 156 2.4-L JTD became the first passenger car to use common rail injection. In 1999, the Volkswagen 1.2-litre TDI won the International Engine of the Year categories for "1.0 to 1.4 litres" and "Best Fuel Economy".

In 2000, a fuel system using unit injectors (called "Pumpe Düse" by Volkswagen) began to replace the distributor injection pump systems (except for the V8 engine, which used common rail design). In 2003, upgraded fuel injectors using a piezoelectric design began to replace the previous solenoid-operated unit injectors. Since 2009, most of the Volkswagen Group TDI engines have switched from unit injectors to common rail injection.

Within the TDI engine type, the most commonly used was the 1.9L TDI which was in production from 1991 to 2010. It became known for its reliability especially due to the ALH engine code and it's rotary pump style which was built much simpler than its PD counterparts. The following generations use a PD injection system placed the fuel injectors and high pressure fuel pump directly under the control of the camshaft, adding extra stress. With an aluminum camshaft, the extra stress causes it to wear down. This is a fault point, and the reason the ALH is considered to be more reliable. The PD engine was the cause of the 1.9 TDI's production to halt. Due to the injector and high pressure fuel pump being in the same system, tuning for emissions became too difficult Instead of fixing the problem, Volkswagen used its defeat device, and ultimately caused diesel gate. This led to their move to common rail injection being their only injection pump style. PD engines have their benefits however. The engine code following the ALH, the BEW, is very receptive to being tuned for horsepower, especially after the camshaft is replaced with a stronger cam effectively removing the fault point.

== Emissions testing falsification ==
On 18 September 2015 the US EPA and California Air Resources Board served notice to VW that approximately 480,000 VW and Audi automobiles equipped with 2.0 TDI engines sold in the US between 2009 and 2015 had an emissions compliance defeat device installed. The defeat device, in the form of specially crafted engine management unit firmware, detects emissions testing conditions, and in such conditions will cause the vehicle to comply with emissions regulations by properly activating all emissions controls. However, under normal driving conditions, the emissions controls are suppressed, allowing the engine to produce more torque and get better fuel economy, at the expense of emitting up to 40 times more nitrogen oxides than allowed by law. Such NOx emission levels are not in compliance with US regulations. VW has since admitted to these allegations, and said that the illegal software was in use in its diesel cars worldwide, affecting some 11 million vehicles.

== Motor racing ==
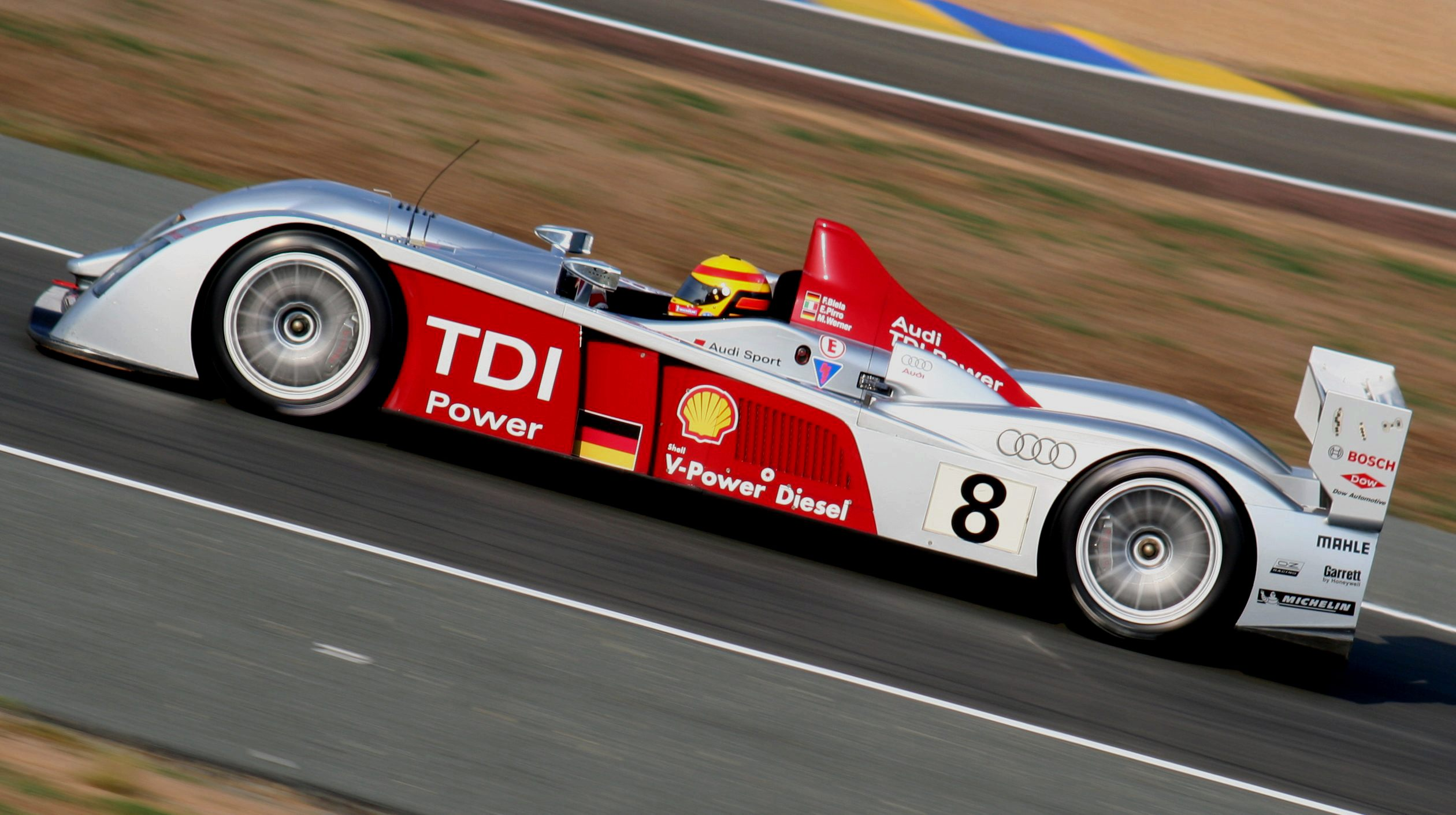
2006 Audi R10 TDI LMP1 racing car

The first TDI engine used by Volkswagen Group for motor racing was in the Audi R10 TDI, which competed in the Le Mans Prototype (LMP) class of sports car racing. The Audi R10 recorded a victory on its debut at the 2006 12 Hours of Sebring race and then at the 2006 24 Hours of Le Mans race, with both results being the first time that a diesel-powered car had won each race. In the nine years from 2006 to 2014, the R10 and its successors (R15 and R18) won the 24 Hours of Le Mans eight times (the 2009 race was won by another diesel-powered car, the Peugeot 908 HDi FAP).

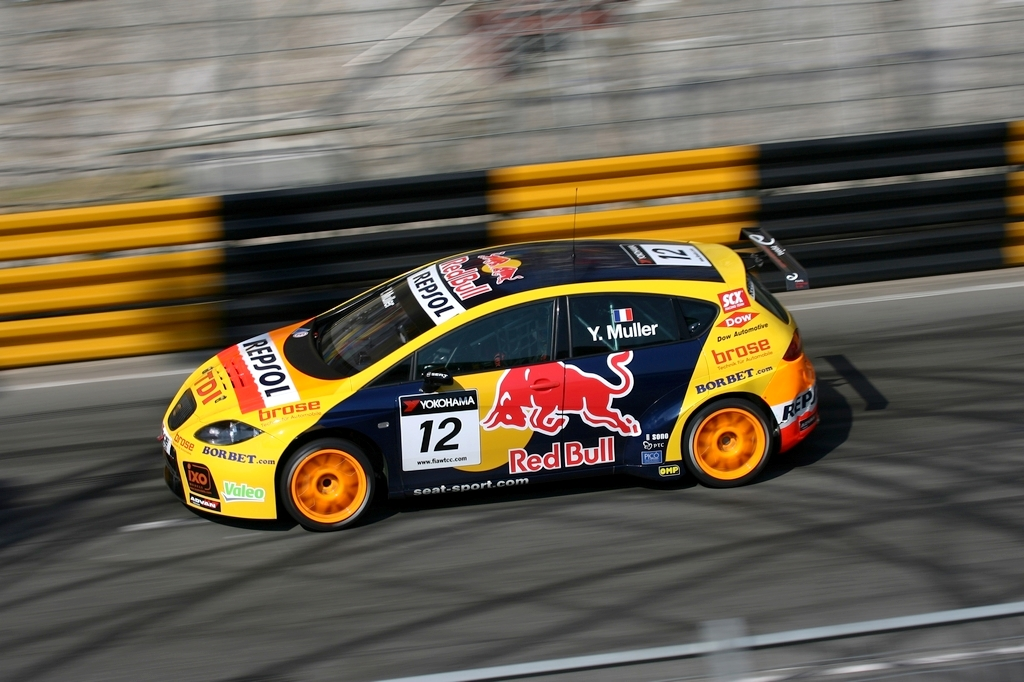
2008 SEAT León TDI WTCC racing car

In the World Touring Car Championship (WTCC) racing series, the SEAT León TDI won the 2008 championship and the 2009 championship for drivers and manufacturers. In 2008, the SEAT Leon TDI also competed in the British Touring Car Championship (BTCC) and became the first diesel car to win a round of the championship when it won the round at Donington Park.

== List of TDI engines ==
=== Applications ===
- Audi A2
- Seat Arosa
- Seat Ibiza Mk4
- Skoda Fabia Mk2
- Volkswagen Lupo
- Volkkswagen Polo Mk5

== See also ==
- Common rail
- Diesel automobile racing
- Diesel engine
- Direct injection
- List of Volkswagen Group diesel engines
- List of discontinued Volkswagen Group diesel engines
- SDI (engine)
- Turbo-diesel
