= Defeat device =

Illegal methods in motor vehicles to overcome emissions controls

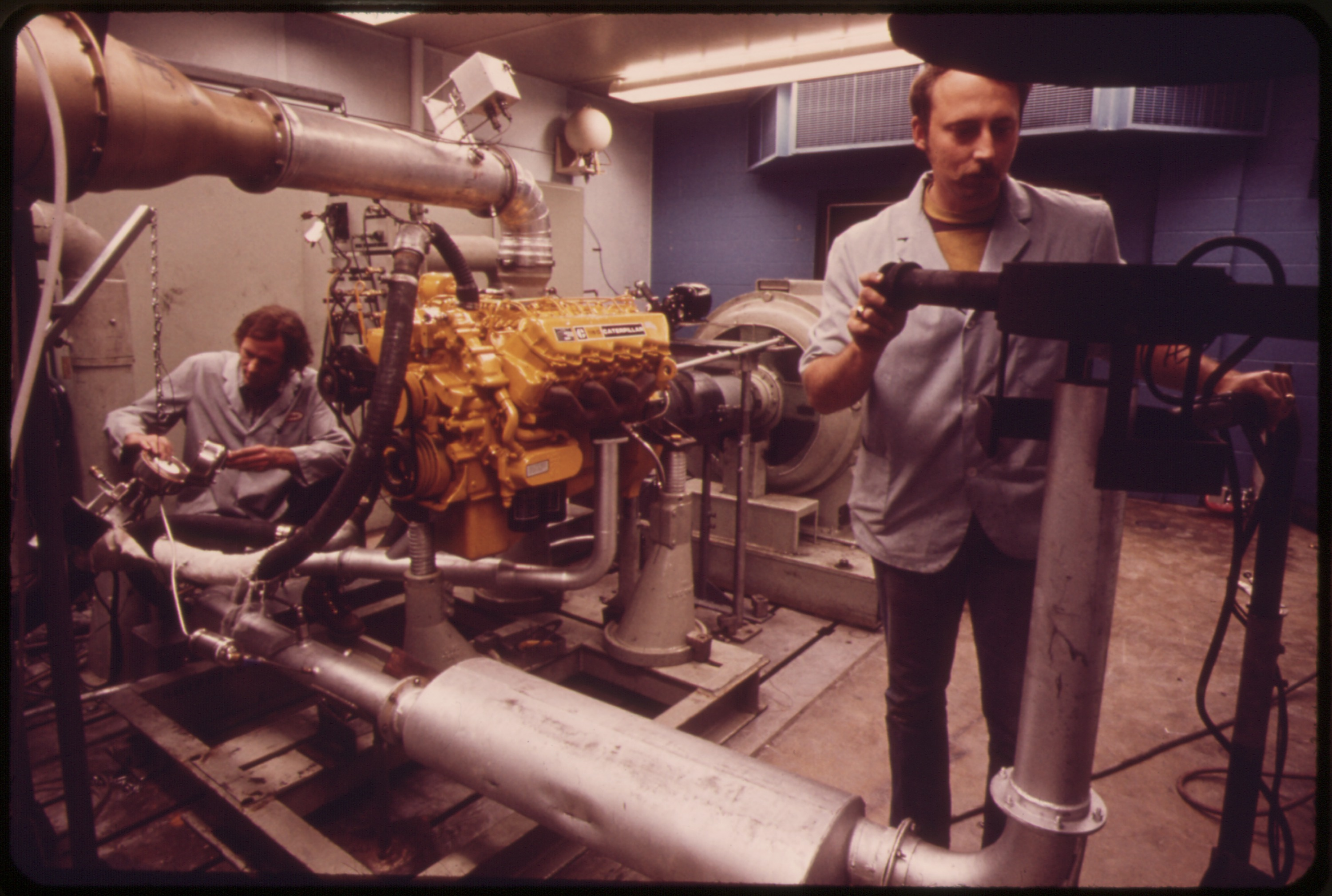
Evaluation and Development control room in the EPA's Motor Vehicle Test Center in Ann Arbor, Michigan, 1973

A defeat device is any motor vehicle hardware, software, or design that interferes with or disables emissions controls under real-world driving conditions, even if the vehicle passes formal emissions testing. The term appears in the US Clean Air Act and European Union regulations, to describe anything that prevents an emissions control system from working, and applies as well to power plants or other air pollution sources, as to automobiles. Use by manufacturers of these devices is considered to have caused many deaths and health problems, a scandal referred to as "Dieselgate".

The United States Environmental Protection Agency (EPA) has taken numerous enforcement actions against car makers and other companies that have used or installed defeat devices, whether deliberately, or through error or negligence. While defeat devices were used worldwide, much less remedial action has been taken in other countries. Defeat devices were built into many vehicles by manufacturers, but aftermarket parts or software, such as modified exhausts and chip tuning products and services, are considered defeat devices if they inhibit or bypass a vehicle's emissions controls.

== Health consequences ==
It was estimated in 2025 that the excess pollution due to the use of defeat devices by Volkswagen and other manufacturers had killed about 124,000 people in the European Union and UK, and caused 30,000 cases of asthma in children in the UK. In the US there had been large fines and compulsory recalls to remove defeat mechanisms, but the UK and most EU countries did not take appropriate action, with devastating impacts on health. While defeat devices were banned in new vehicles, many millions of existing highly polluting diesel vehicles remained on the roads in the UK and EU as of 2025, and a further 81,000 premature deaths were predicted to occur in later years unless action was taken. The economic harm in the EU and UK was estimated at €760bn, with a further €430bn by 2040 unless action is taken.

== Timeline ==
=== 1970s ===
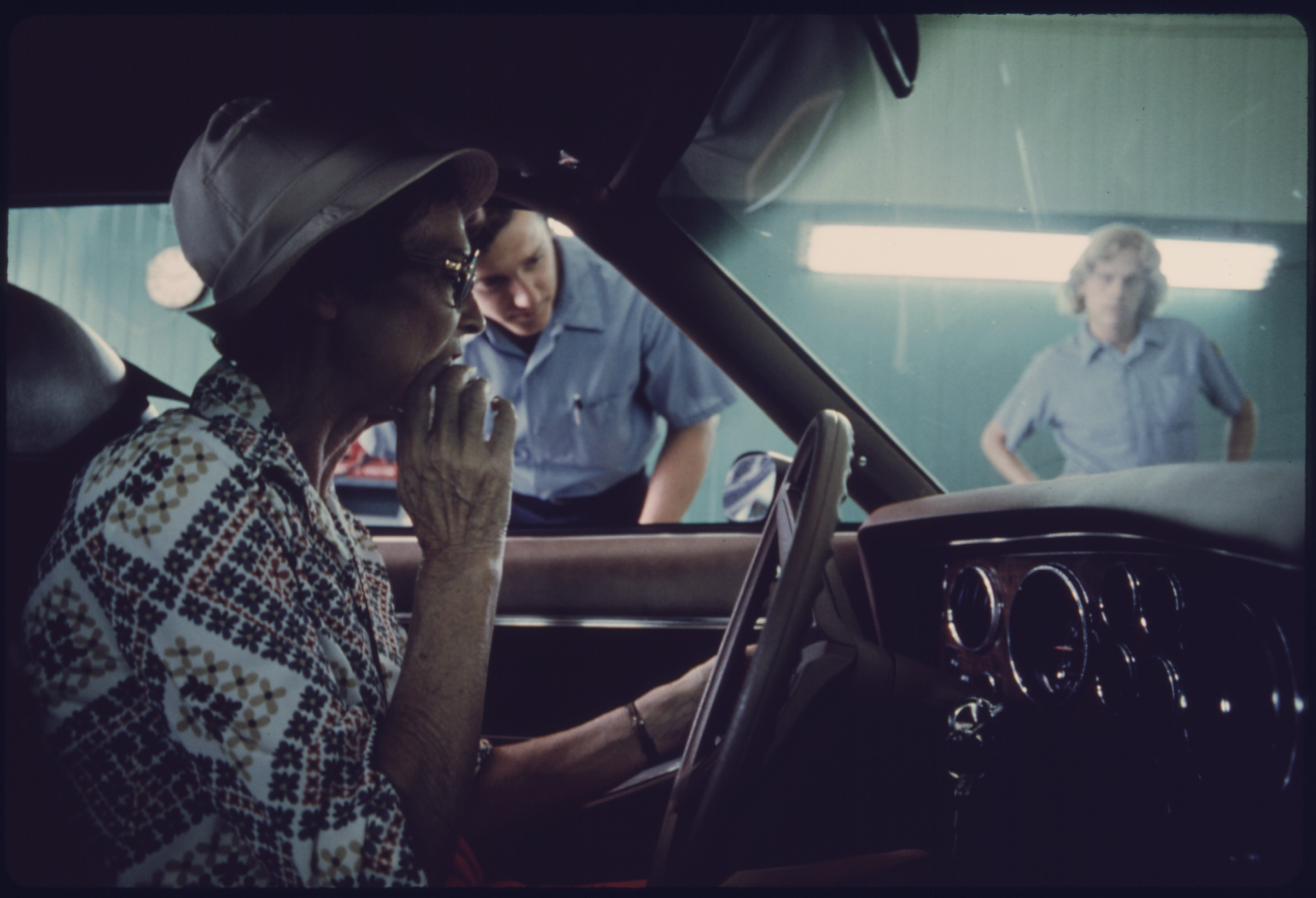
Auto emissions inspection in Norwood, Ohio, in 1975

In 1973 the Big Three American automobile manufacturers, Chrysler, Ford Motor Company and General Motors, along with import brand Toyota, were ordered by the EPA to stop using ambient temperature switches which disabled pollution controls at low temperatures. The automakers agreed to cease using the ambient temperature switches in the way the EPA said was in violation of the Clean Air Act, while insisting that the switches were not 'defeat devices' intended to evade rules. The auto companies said the devices improved engine efficiency and actually reduced pollution. The EPA order affected 2 million 1973 model year cars slated for production, but did not require a recall of cars already on the road.

Also in 1973, Volkswagen agreed to a settlement with the EPA, in which they admitted no wrongdoing and paid a $120,000 fine, for failing to disclose the existence of two temperature sensing switches that affected emissions function. In their 1974 model year application to the EPA, VW disclosed the presence of the switches and the EPA rejected them, so they were removed.

=== 1990s ===
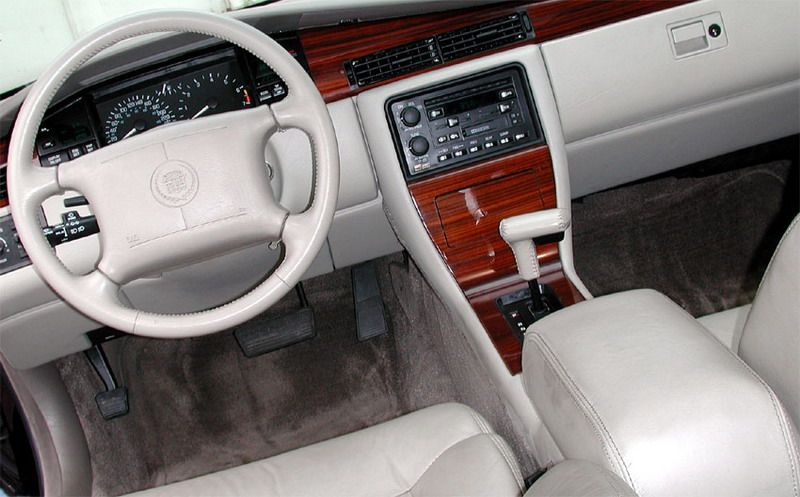
1995 Cadillac Seville disengaged emissions controls whenever heat or air conditioning was on

In 1995, General Motors was ordered to recall 470,000 model year 1991 through 1995 Cadillacs and pay an US$11 million fine for programming the car's electronic control unit (ECU) to enrich the fuel mixture any time the car's air conditioning or cabin heat was operating, since the EPA tests are conducted with those systems turned off. The richer fuel mixture was needed to address an engine stalling problem, resulting in emissions of up to 10 grams per mile of carbon monoxide (CO), nearly three times the limit of 3.4 g/mi. While the EPA and Justice Department contended that GM intentionally violated emissions standards, GM said that was "a matter of interpretation." Besides the fine, the second largest Clean Air Act penalty as of 1995, GM had to spend up to $34 million for anti-pollution programs and recall 470,000 Cadillac 4.9 liter Eldorados, Fleetwoods, DeVilles, and Sevilles.

In 1996, Honda reached an agreement with the EPA to extend the warranties and offer free services for 1.6 million 1995 Civics and 1996–1997 model year Acuras, Accords, Civics, Preludes, and Odysseys, because Honda had disabled an engine misfire monitoring device that would have otherwise directed drivers to seek repairs. Honda was required to spend a total of $254 million on the warranties, service, pollution reduction projects, and $12.6 million in civil penalties.

Also in 1996, Ford reached a consent decree to spend $7.9 million to address a defeat device on 60,000 1997 model year Econoline vans which used a "sophisticated electronic control strategy designed to enhance fuel economy", disabling NO_{x} emissions controls only while the vans were driven at highway speeds, but not during lab testing to verify emissions control compliance.

In 1998, the EPA announced fines totaling $83.4 million against seven diesel engine manufacturers, the largest fine to date, which evaded testing by shutting down emissions controls during highway driving while being compliant during lab testing. The seven, Caterpillar, Cummins, Detroit Diesel, Mack Trucks, Navistar International, Renault Trucks, and Volvo Trucks, also agreed to spend more than $1 billion to correct the problem. The trucks used engine ECU software to engage pollution controls during the 20-minute lab tests to verify compliance with the Clean Air Act, but then disable the emissions controls during normal highway cruising, emitting up to three times the maximum allowed NO_{x} pollution.

=== 2000s ===
In 2000 the German motorcycle magazine Motorrad reported about a defeat device delivered with the BMW F 650 GS. BMW responded by providing improved injection in 2001, and recalling the models from the previous year for correction.

=== 2010s ===
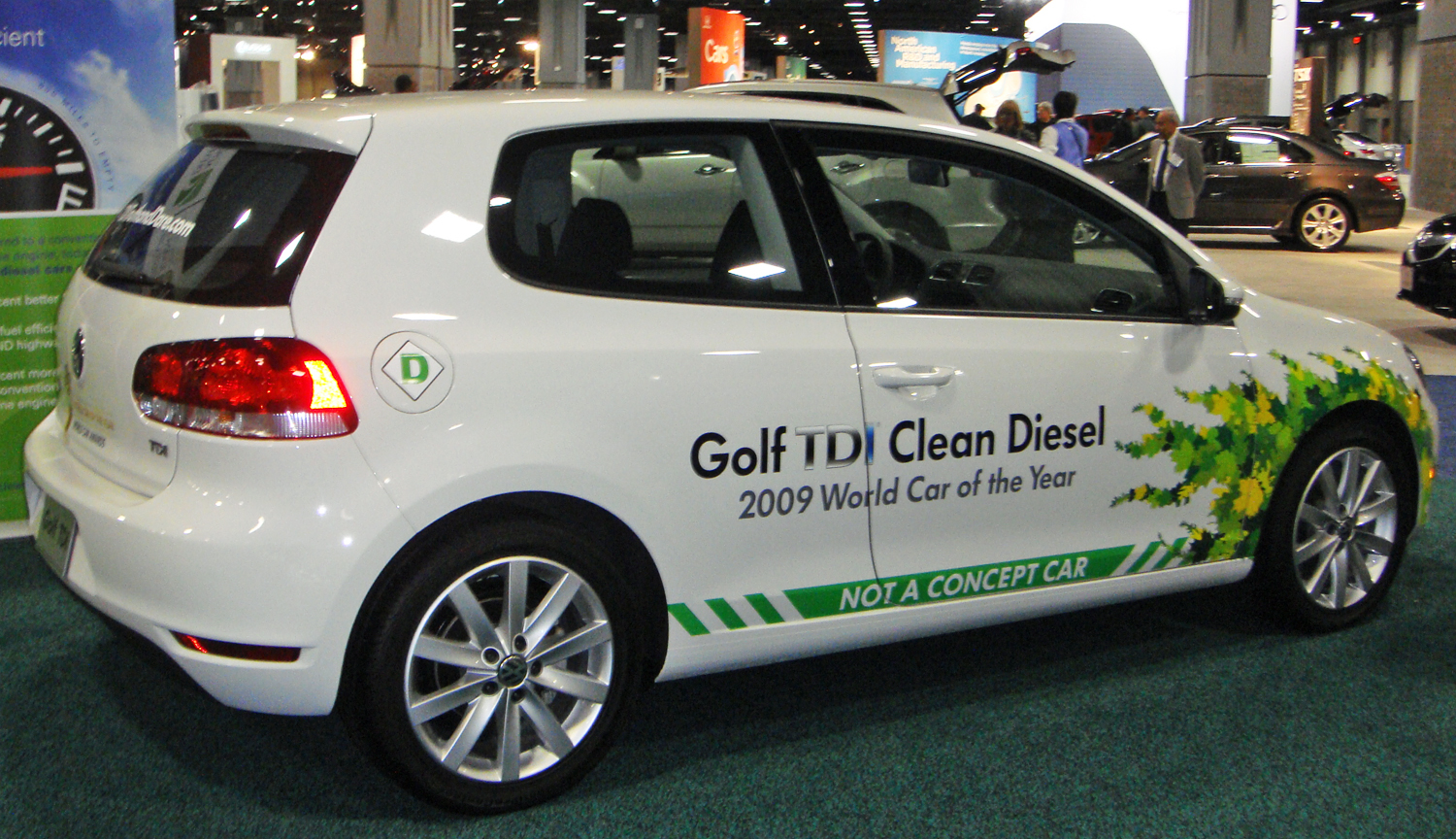
2010 VW Golf TDI programmed to cheat on emissions testing, displaying "Clean Diesel" at a US auto show

In late 2015, the EPA discovered that software used in millions of Volkswagen Group turbocharged direct injection (TDI) diesel engines included features intended to produce misleading results during laboratory emissions testing.

On 10 October 2015, Consumer Reports tested a 2015 Jetta TDI and a 2011 Jetta Sportwagen TDI in what they presumed was the special emissions testing, or cheat mode. The 0 to 60 mph (0 to 97 km/h) acceleration time of the 2011 Jetta increased from 9.9 to 10.5 seconds, and the 2015 car's time went from 9.1 to 9.2 seconds. The fuel economy of the 2011 car decreased from 50 to 46 mpg_{‑US} (4.7 to 5.1 L/100 km; 60 to 55 mpg_{‑imp}) and the 2015 car's fuel economy decreased from 53 to 50 mpg_{‑US} (4.4 to 4.7 L/100 km; 64 to 60 mpg_{‑imp}). Consumer Reports's Director of Auto Testing said that while the added fuel costs, "may not be dramatic, these cars may no longer stand out among many very efficient competitors." The method the magazine used to engage cheat mode while driving required making assumptions about the ECU's operations. Because disabling electronic stability control is a necessary step for running a car on a dynamometer, the magazine assumed that this would put the car in cheat mode. In order to keep the electronic stability control from reactivating while driving, they disconnected the cars' rear wheel speed sensors, simulating the inputs the ECU receives while the car is on a stationary test rig, even though it was being driven on the road. Besides front and rear wheel speeds, the EPA had said that steering wheel movement, barometric pressure and duration of engine operation were factors in triggering cheat mode.

Fiat Chrysler produced over 100,000 model year 2014 through 2016 Ram 1500 and Jeep Grand Cherokee vehicles for sale in the United States with EcoDiesel engines in which the US EPA and the California Air Resources Board alleged had a defeat device.

=== 2020s ===
In January 2026, the US Justice Department announced it would "no longer pursue criminal charges under the Clean Air Act based on allegations of" involvement with defeat devices.
