= BMW F650CS =

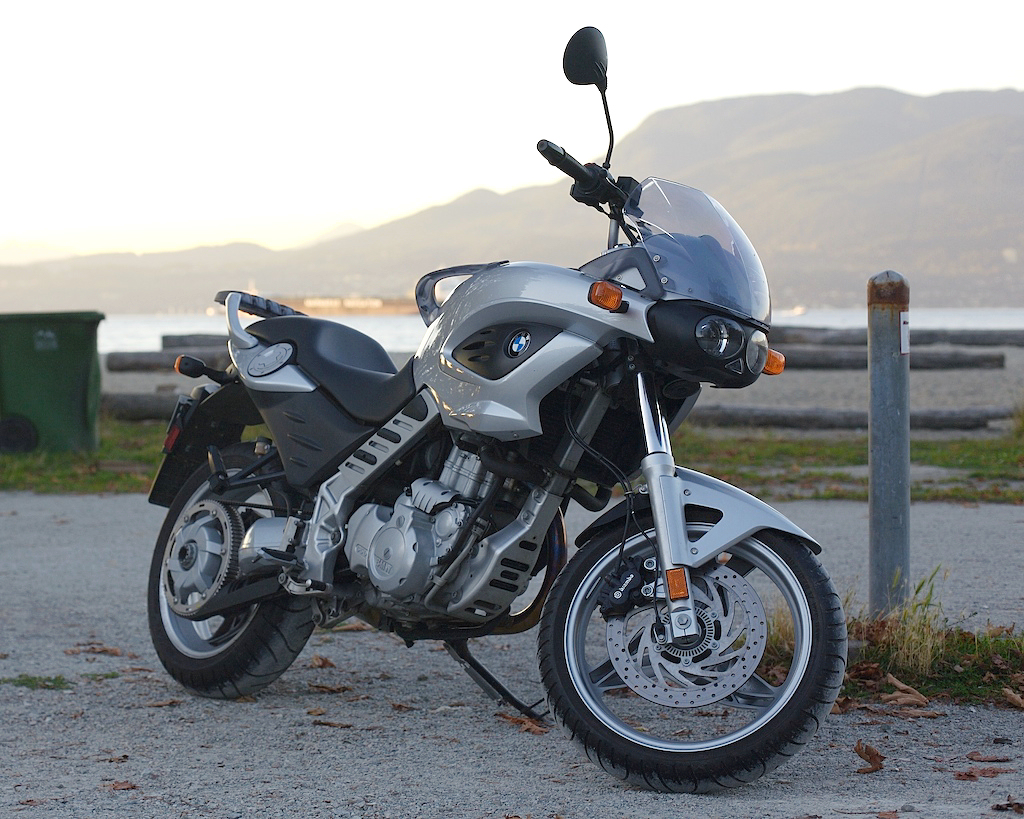
- Manufacturer: BMW Motorrad
- Also called: Scarver
- Parent company: BMW
- Production: 2001–2005
- Predecessor: F650 Strada
- Class: Standard
- Engine: 652 cc (39.8 cu in), water-cooled four-stroke single DOHC, 4 valves
- Bore / stroke: 100 mm × 83 mm (3.9 in × 3.3 in)
- Top speed: 109 mph (175 km/h)112 mph (180 km/h)
- Power: 50 bhp (37 kW) @ 6800 rpm (claimed); 34 bhp (25 kW) @ 6500 rpm (restricted); 44.2 hp (33.0 kW) (rear wheel)
- Torque: 62 N⋅m (46 lbf⋅ft) @ 5,500 rpm(claimed); 59.9 N⋅m (44.2 lbf⋅ft) (rear wheel)
- Transmission: 5-speed, cable-actuated wet clutch, toothed belt final drive
- Suspension: Front: 41 mm telescopic fork, fork stabiliser Rear: Die cast aluminium single-sided swingarm with rear wheel axle adjustable via Excenter, central strut controlled by means of lever system
- Brakes: Front: 1 disc, 2 piston floating caliper; Rear: 1 disc, 1 piston floating caliper; ABS optional, diameter front: 300 mm (12 in) rear: 240 mm (9.4 in)
- Tires: Front: 110/70R17; Rear 160/60R17
- Rake, trail: 27.9°, 3.4 in (86 mm)
- Wheelbase: 1,493 mm (58.8 in)
- Dimensions: L: 2,142 mm (84.3 in)
- Seat height: 780 mm (31 in); Optional 750 mm (30 in) seat Or 810 mm (32 in) with optional 150 series rear tires and high seat
- Weight: 189 kg (417 lb)(claimed); 196 kg (432 lb) (wet)
- Fuel capacity: 15 L (3.3 imp gal; 4.0 US gal)
- Fuel consumption: 46.1 mpg_{‑US} (5.10 L/100 km; 55.4 mpg_{‑imp})
- Related: F650GS

The BMW F650CS was a standard motorcycle made by BMW Motorrad from 2001 to 2005. CS stood for city/street, as it was aimed at urban commuters and it was also known as the Scarver, a portmanteau of street and carver. The CS was the third generation in the F650 single series, after the 1993–2001 F650, and 2000–7 F650GS. It was known for its offbeat styling intended to attract new motorcyclists.

== Design ==
The F650CS was designed by American David Robb, Vice President of BMW Motorrad Design from 1993 to 2012, and designer of the R1100RT, K1200RS, R1200C, R1100S and K1200LT. The bike was the result of a partnership between BMW and Aprilia.

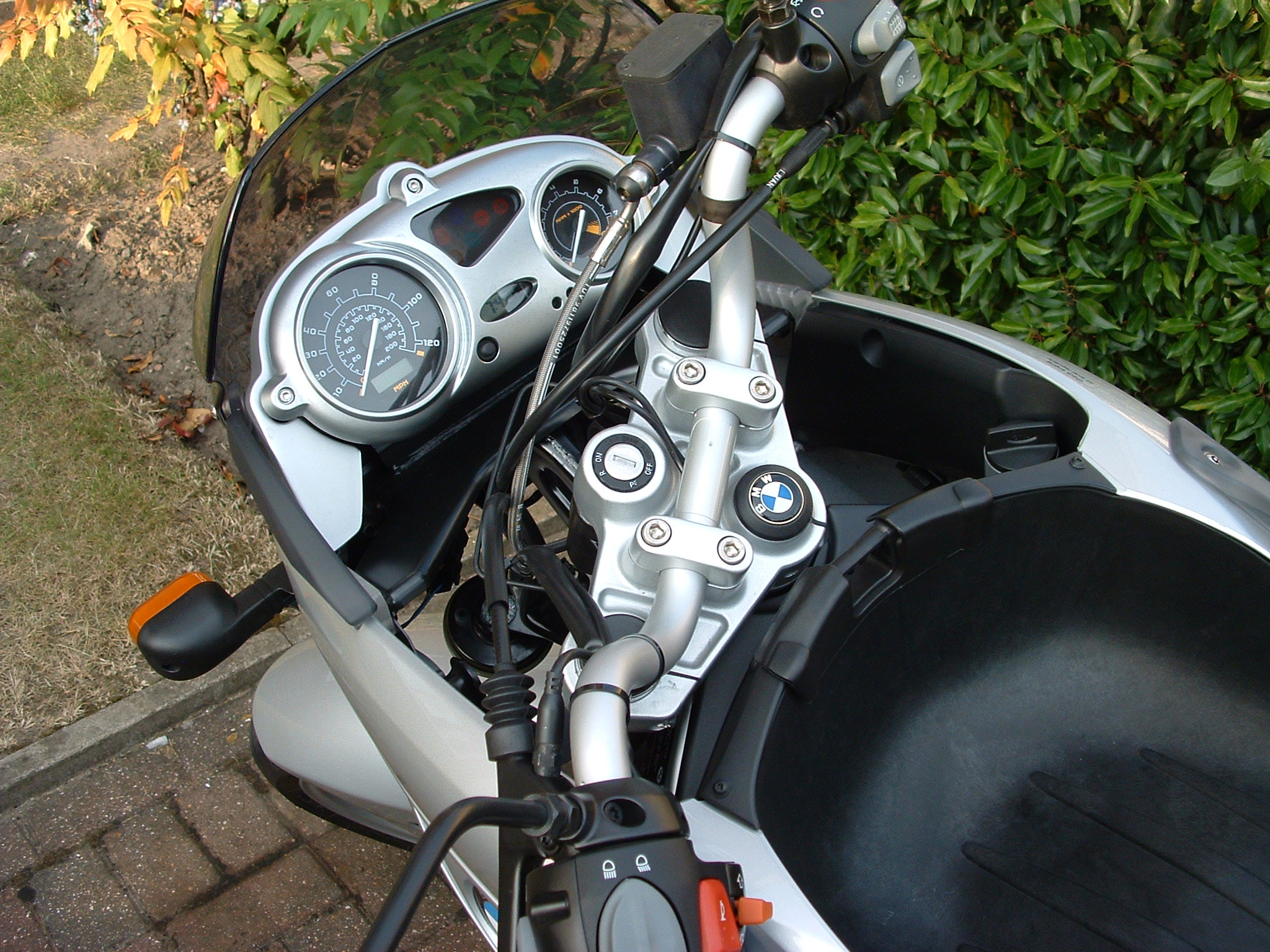
The storage compartment where most motorcycles have the fuel tank.

Many elements of the design, such as the striking colors used for the coordinated body panels, the Space Age instrument panel, translucent passenger grab handles, and slickly serviceable storage compartment had a consumer appliance feel and appearance, "remind[ing] you of current computer peripherals such as HP ScanJet printers." Its small transparent wind screen seemed "iMac-inspired", and the use of translucent polycarbonate elsewhere hinted at Apple's style at the time. The addition of superfluous oblong slots with incongruous rubber inserts along the sides of the aluminum frame led Rider magazine to quip that it was "overstyled". BMW "ripped a page from the strategy book of Apple Computer Inc" with its three "youth-oriented" color choices, azure blue metallic, golden orange metallic and beluga blue.

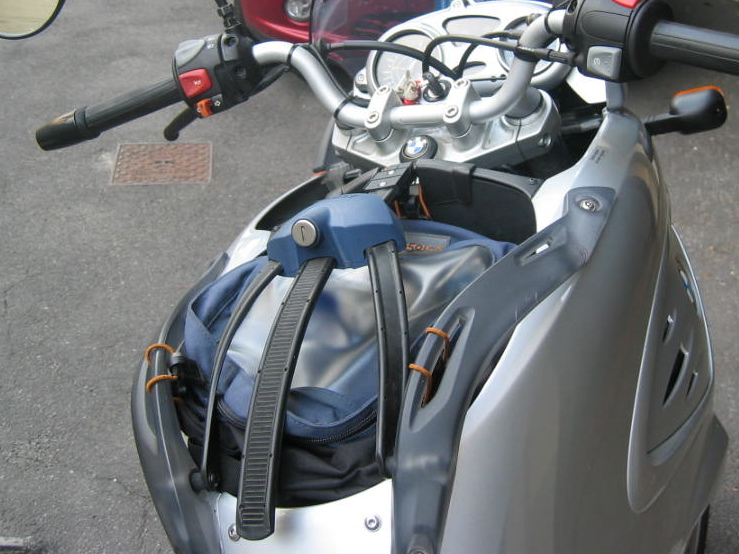
One of the F650CS removable bag options.

To help attract the fashion conscious buyer, the F650CS had special color options for the side panels, either to match the other body panels or in aluminum, and a choice of two seat colors, for a total of 24 permutations. This modularity extended to the multi-use top storage compartment, which came with a small removable soft bag, and was used for an optional larger soft shoulder bag, or a hard plastic case which could have added an audio system with a CD player. The ignition key matched all three different locking compartment options, and the audio system was integrated with the speedometer so that it automatically increased the music volume at higher speeds and increased the bass at low speed.

While the F650CS was similar to the GS released in 2000, it had several unique features including a single-sided swingarm, toothed belt drive, modular soft case baggage, and a storage area in what would traditionally be the top tank of the bike. The fuel tank was instead placed underneath the rear half of the seat, with the fuel filler cap on the right hand side of the rear of the bike.

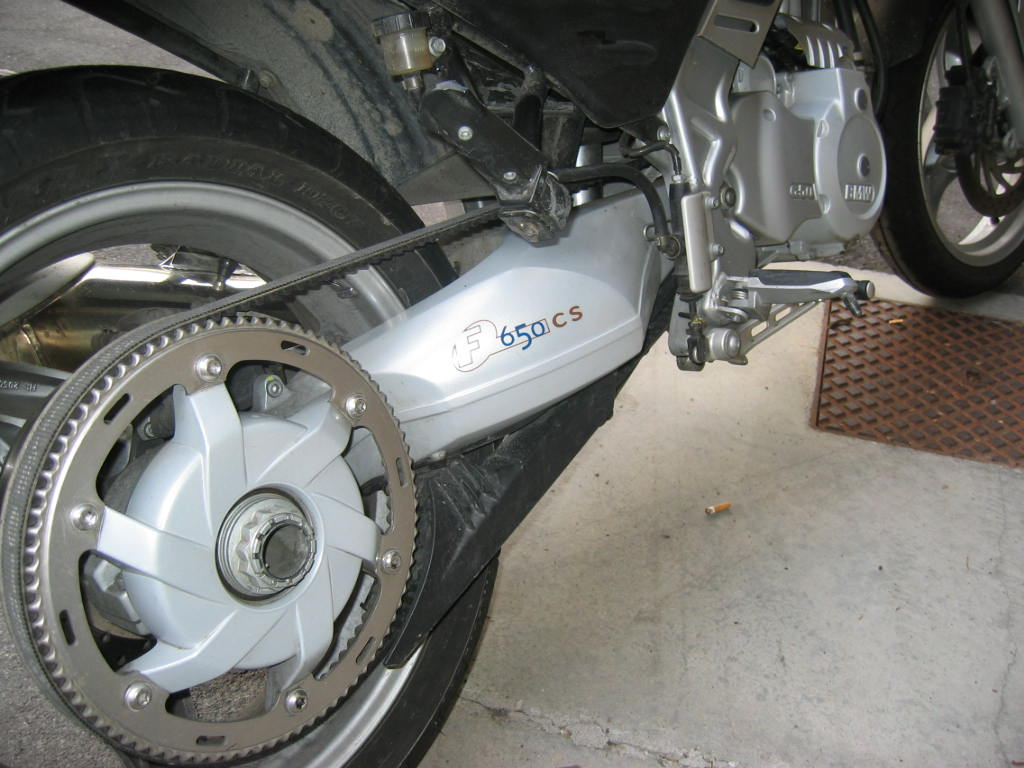
A toothed belt drive is cleaner, quieter, and more responsive than a chain drive, and requires less maintenance, but has greater power losses.

Traditionally, BMW has favored shaft drive, but for the first time chose belt drive for this application for its advantages in cost and weight over shaft drive, and because it did not require the frequent cleaning, lubrication, and adjustment of roller chain drive, as well as lasting longer than a chain and running quieter. Using belt drive was consistent with the intent to attract new motorcyclists who might not be comfortable with the mechanical chores normally associated with motorcycling. Though belt drives have greater power loss than chains, which are typical of high-performance motorcycles, they do not suffer from chain lash, since chains must be kept slightly loose but belts remain tight at all times, meaning the responsiveness of the drivetrain is comparable to a heavier and more costly shaft drive.

== Performance ==
The Rotax single-cylinder engine was low-powered compared to the liter class superbikes that could be had for the same price at the time, but considered on its own merits the bike's 44.2 hp (33.0 kW) (rear wheel) was more than adequate for spirited riding in an urban setting, and the 59.9 N⋅m (44.2 lbf⋅ft) rear wheel torque allowed for easy acceleration when maneuvering in traffic. Testers found the handling light and quick, and surprisingly enjoyable in low-speed twisties and canyon curves. Acceleration was tested at 0 to 60 mph (0 to 97 km/h) in 4.72 to 5.47 seconds and 13.07 seconds to the ¼ mile at 99.9 mph (160.8 km/h). Braking 60 to 0 miles per hour (97 to 0 km/h) was 116.5 to 118.5 ft (35.5 to 36.1 m).

== Sales ==
Initial press reaction among motorcycle critics was uniformly positive, particularly praising BMW for taking a bold and innovative risk, and for their willingness to break traditional molds and entice consumers other than the typical motorcycle rider, though they worried that the cachet of the BMW label would not be enough to justify the premium price. It appeared at a time when most motorcycles were increasing in horsepower and specialization, and the F650CS went against those marketing trends, aimed instead at urban commuters, non-traditional riders, new motorcyclists, women, and shorter riders. The model was one example of BMW's efforts to combat becoming too much of an "old man's brand", and expand beyond their famous touring machines into new markets. The bike's designer David Robb said that, "If we want to offer something to new people we have to offer something new." The large storage space and ease of use suggested the F650CS could attract scooter commuters as well as motorcyclists. BMW estimated 40% of sales would come from non-motorcyclists. It was BMW's first entry-level motorcycle since the R65 of 1978–1984. The F650CS was derived from the dual-sport F650GS single, which was BMW's top selling model worldwide in 2001.

In its Canadian advertising campaign, the bike was tied with images of extreme sports in unlikely locales, like snowboarding down Mount Everest and windsurfing whitecaps in the Pacific Ocean, accompanied by lines such as "You feel the urge to windsurf across the Pacific Ocean... but what you really need is a ride on the new F650CS." Hendrik von Kuenheim, president and CEO of BMW Group explained that, "These riders want a bike that expresses their individuality and expands on their already exciting lifestyle." Ads were placed in lifestyle magazines rather than specialty motorcycle magazines.

But for the year 2002, Motorcyclist magazine described the F650CS's sales as an "unmitigated flop", which languished alongside other lightweight European motorcycles that consumers found too expensive outside their home markets. Three years later, in 2005, the F650CS was discontinued, and the F800 series was introduced in 2006, but it was a different class of motorcycle, aimed at the middleweight sport bike segment, for riders looking to upgrade from their first bike, or return to motorcycling, rather than the beginning motorcyclist market. The F800 had a straight-twin engine, not a single, and though it shared belt drive with the F650CS and boasted its own technical innovations, it did not push the design envelope with the kind of unusual features found on the CS, nor did it elicit commentary for the polarizing nontraditional styling the CS was noted for.

== See also ==
- List of motorcycles by type of engine
