= BMW F series single-cylinder =

BMW F650 BMW F650ST Strada
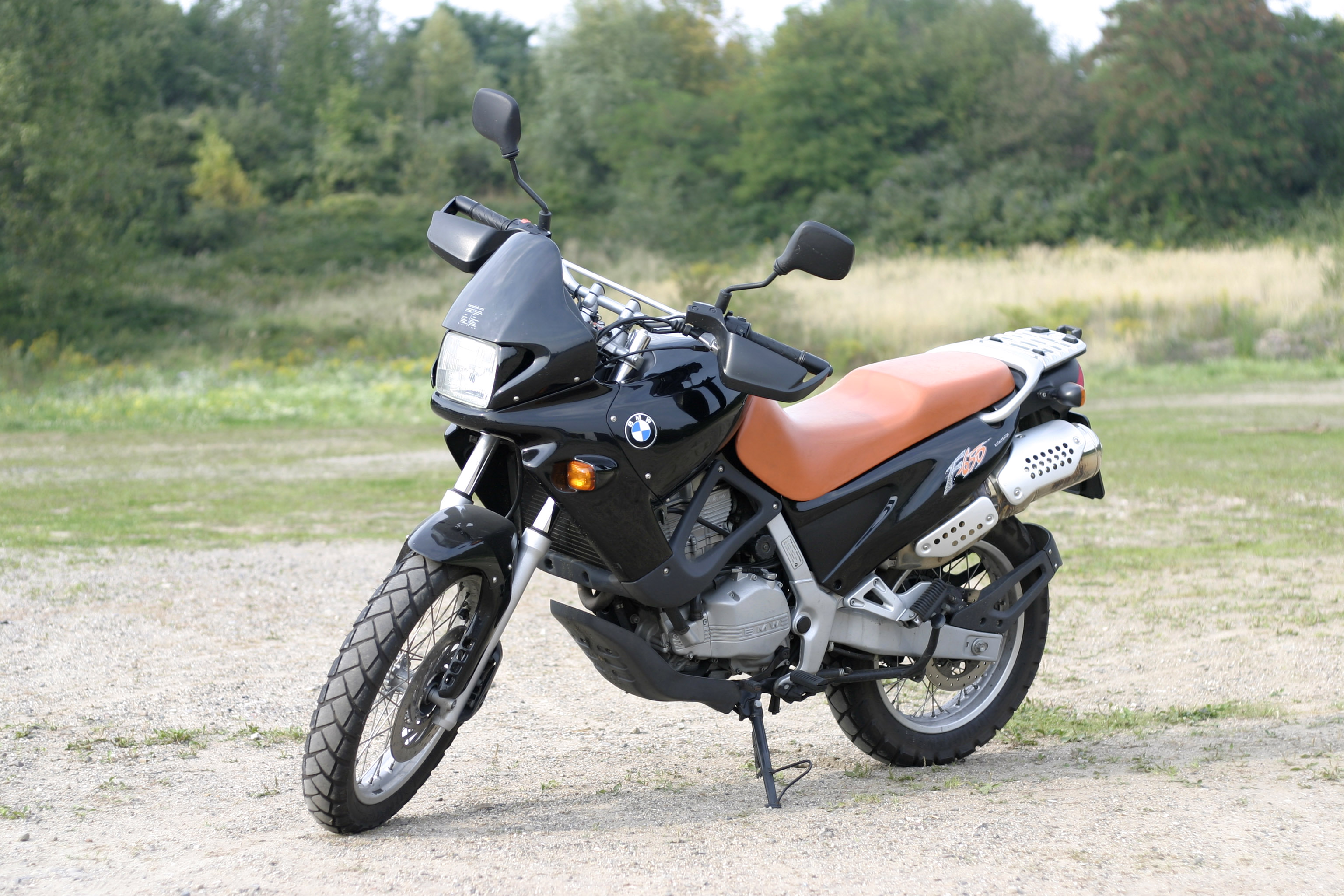
- Manufacturer: BMW Motorrad
- Production: 1993–2000
- Successor: F650GS/F650CS
- Class: F650St Strada: Standard / naked F650: Multi-purpose / off road capable
- Engine: 652 cc (39.8 cu in), Rotax single
- Bore / stroke: 100 mm × 83 mm (3.9 in × 3.3 in)
- Top speed: F650 - 185Kmh (max rpm 8000); F650ST Strada - 165Kmh (max rpm 7000)
- Power: 48hp (35kW) @ 6500rpm
- Torque: 39.2 lb⋅ft (53.1 N⋅m)
- Transmission: 5-speed, chain drive
- Tires: F650St Strada - Front: 100/90 -18; F650 - Front: 100/90 -19; Both model variants - Rear: Rear: 130/80 -17
- Wheelbase: F650 Strada - 57.6inches(1465mm); F650 58inches(1480mm)
- Dimensions: L: F650St Strada - 85inches (2160mm); F650 - 85.2 inches (2180mm); W: Both F650 and F650 Strada - 34.6inches (880mm). H: F650St Strada and F650 - 48 inches (1220mm)
- Seat height: F650St Strada - 30.9 inches (785mm); F650 (1994-1996) - 31.5 inches (800mm); F650 (1997-2000) - 31.9 inches (810mm). Some documented sources state 32.3 inches (820mm) on the F650 from 1997 onwards, this isn't verified.
- Weight: 173 kg (unladen) (dry); 191 kg (wet)
- Fuel capacity: 17.5Ltr
- Related: F650St Strada - Suzuki 650 Freewind and the Aprilia Pegaso 650

BMW F650GS
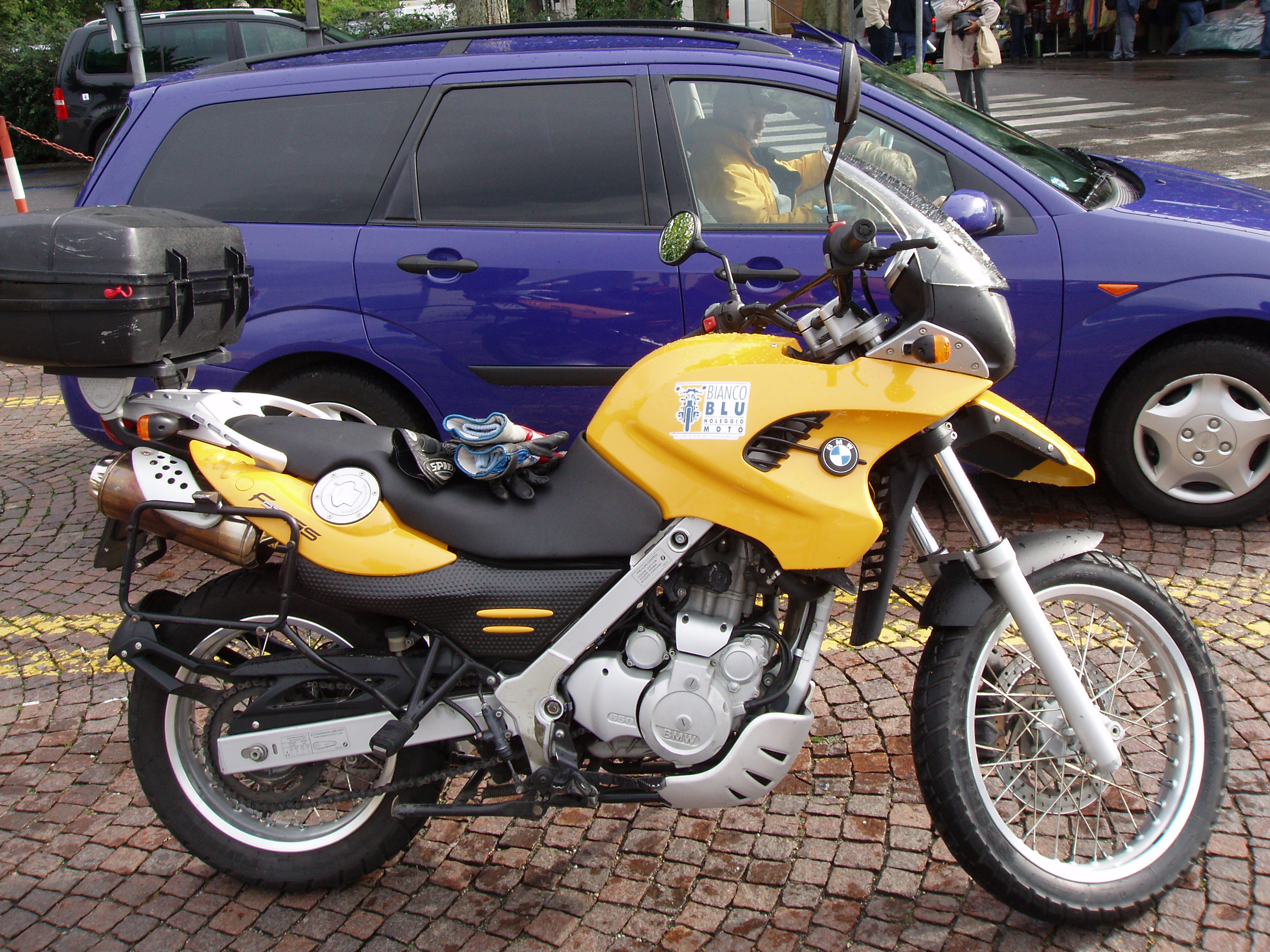
- Manufacturer: BMW Motorrad
- Production: 2000–2008
- Predecessor: F650 Funduro
- Successor: F650GS (twin) & F800GS; G650GS
- Class: Dual-sport
- Engine: 652 cc (39.8 cu in), water-cooled, four-stroke, DOHC, 4 valve, single
- Power: 50 hp (37 kW) @ 6500 rpm
- Torque: 44 lb⋅ft (60 N⋅m) @ 5000 rpm
- Transmission: 5-speed, O-Ring Chain
- Brakes: Front: 1 disc, 2 piston caliper; Rear: 1 disc, 1 piston caliper; ABS optional
- Tires: 19 inch front, 17 inch rear
- Wheelbase: 1,479 mm (58.2 in)
- Dimensions: L: 2,175 mm (85.6 in); W: 910 mm (36 in)
- Seat height: 30.9 in (785 mm)
- Weight: 387 lb (175.5 kg) (dry); 423 lb (192 kg) (wet)
- Fuel capacity: 17.3 L (3.8 imp gal; 4.6 US gal)
- Related: F650CS

BMW F650GS Dakar
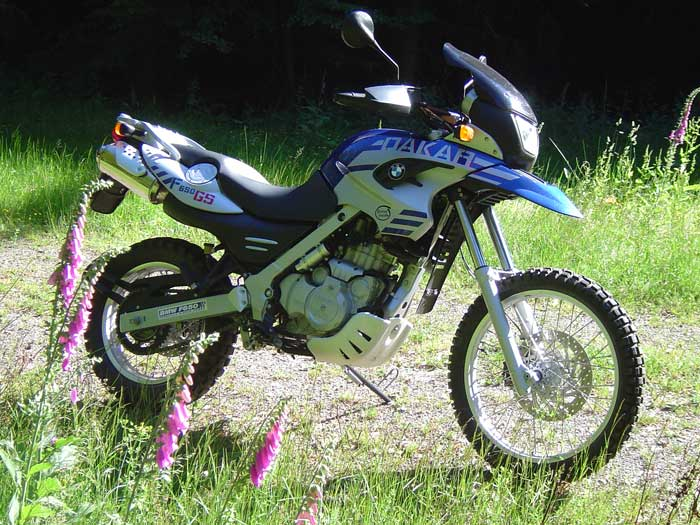
- Manufacturer: BMW Motorrad
- Production: 2000–2008
- Predecessor: F650 Funduro
- Successor: F650GS (twin) & F800GS; G650GS
- Class: Dual-sport
- Engine: 652 cc, Single-cylinder, Water-cooled, Four-stroke, DOHC, 4-valves
- Power: 50 hp (37 kW) @ 6500 rpm
- Torque: 44 lb⋅ft (60 N⋅m) @ 5000 rpm
- Transmission: 5-speed, O-Ring Chain
- Brakes: Front: 1 disc, 2 piston caliper; Rear: 1 disc, 1 piston caliper; ABS optional
- Tires: 21 inch front, 17 inch rear
- Rake, trail: 29.2°, 4.9 in (124 mm)
- Wheelbase: 58.6 in (1,488 mm)
- Dimensions: L: 86.2 in (2,189 mm); W: 35.8 in (909 mm); H: 49.8 in (1,265 mm)
- Seat height: 34.3 in (871 mm)
- Weight: 390.7 lb (177.2 kg) (dry); 425.5 lb (193.0 kg) (wet)
- Fuel capacity: 17.3 L (3.8 imp gal; 4.6 US gal)

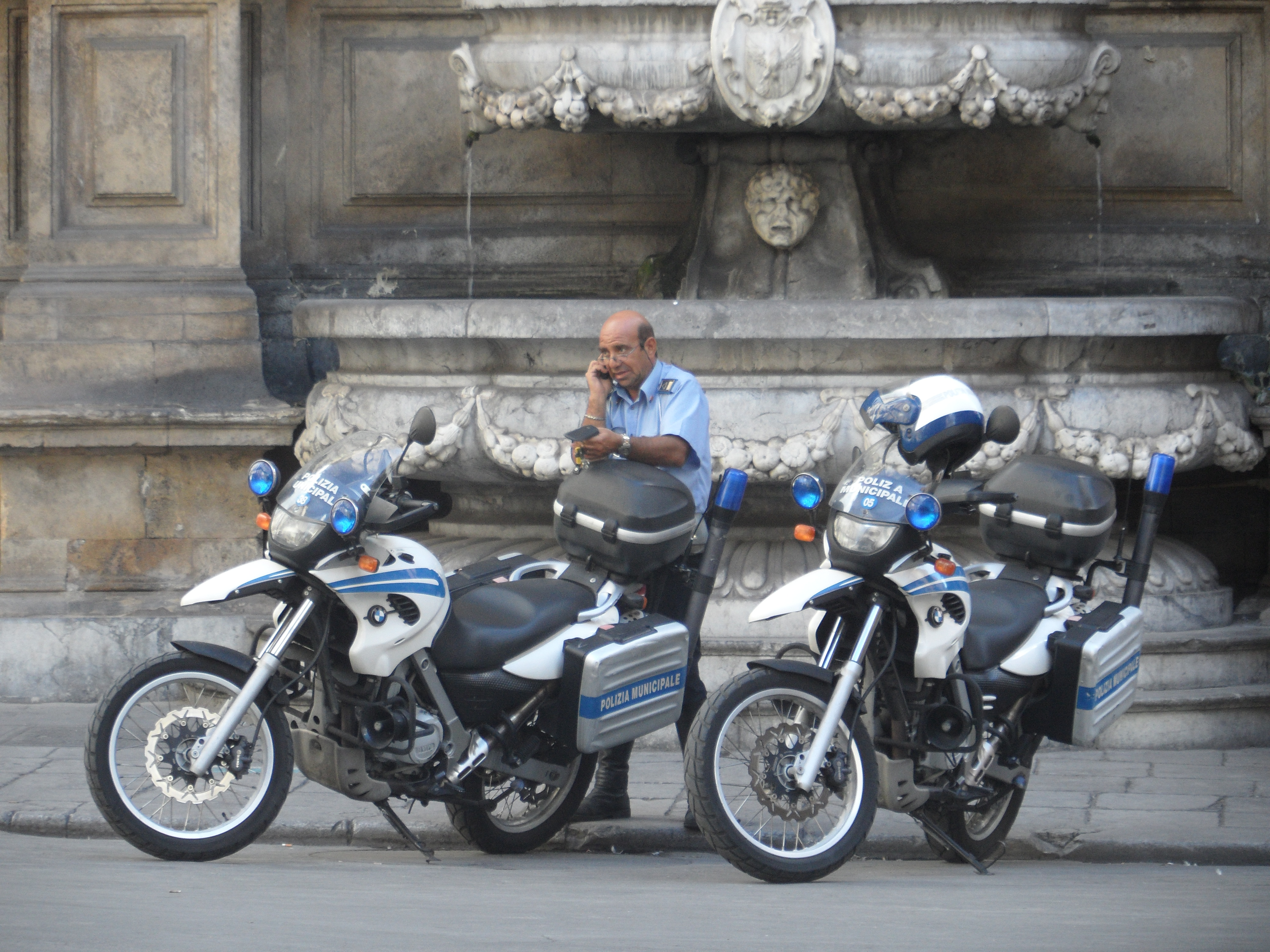
Motorbikes BMW F650 GS Polizia Municipale in Palermo 2013

The BMW F650 is a family of motorcycles developed by BMW Motorrad beginning in 1993. Models included the F650St Strada and from 1994, the F650 (dubbed the 'Funduro') which, due to some subtle differences, was considered to be a more dual/multi purpose motorcycle with some off-road capability. The 1993 - 2000 F650 was the first single-cylinder motorcycle from BMW since the 1960–1966 R27, and the first chain driven motorcycles from BMW.

Newer models (post-2000) included the F650CS Scarver, F650GS, and F650GS Dakar.

== 1993–2000: F650 and F650St Strada ==
The BMW F650St Strada was introduced to Europe in 1993, a variant F650 (dubbed the 'Funduro') in 1994 and then to the United States in 1997. The BMW F650 models were jointly designed by BMW and Aprilia, who also launched their own very similar model called the Aprilia Pegaso 650 (a 654cc single cylinder, 5 valve motorcycle). The BMW version was assembled in Italy by Aprilia and these were powered by the Austrian 652cc single-cylinder, 4 valve Rotax engine. It was the first BMW motorcycle with chain drive since the 1960s. The two variant models of the F650 motorcycle had some subtle differences which determined their utility bias: the F650 'Funduro' was the more dual/multi purpose with more off-road capability due to the longer wheel base, more ground clearance and taller seat height, a higher front fairing and a larger 19inch front wheel, the F650St Strada had slightly smaller dimensions and an 18-inch front wheel. Both models used two 33 mm Mikuni carburetors.

In 2000, BMW introduced the F650GS to replace the F650, and the F650CS Scarver to replace the F650St Strada variant. In 2001, the original F650 was discontinued.

== 2000–2007: F650GS, F650GS Dakar, and G650X ==
Produced from 2000 to 2007, the BMW F650GS is a dual-purpose motorcycle. It sold over 105,000 units during its production life. It was available in a lowered model with lower seat height from a shorter rear shock, a standard model, and a taller more off-road oriented 'Dakar' model. The Dakar model had a thinner, 21 inch front wheel (as opposed to the street oriented 19 inch) and longer suspension travel for improved off-road handling. It also had a thicker, higher seat. It was named after the Paris Dakar Rally, which BMW rider Richard Sainct won on the F650RR in 1999 and 2000.

The 'Dakar' specifications put it in the 650 cc dual-sport class, competing against bikes such as the Kawasaki KLR650, Suzuki DR650, Honda XR650L, KTM LC4 640, Yamaha XT660 and Honda Transalp.

A specially prepared rally raid version of the bike was used by Charley Boorman and his team during the 2006 Dakar Rally while filming their documentary Race to Dakar.

The G650X series was released as 2007-year models, consisting of the off-road X-Challenge, the scrambler-style X-Country, and the road-oriented X-Moto. This series was discontinued after the 2009 model year.

=== Design and technology ===
The F650GS had several advanced technology features for its time, with computer-controlled fuel injection, catalytic converter, a Nikasil-lined cylinder, optional ABS and an airbox designed to exploit the airflow pattern of the bike when in motion. Combined with the bike's high compression ratio and twin spark plugs (from 2004 onwards), excellent fuel economy and low emissions existed alongside high power output. The original F650 single-engine was manufactured for BMW by Austrian company Rotax while the bike was assembled by Aprilia. When the F650GS was launched, the full process was brought back in-house.

In 2000, the German motorcycle magazine Motorrad reported about a defeat device installed in the BMW F 650 GS. BMW responded by providing improved injection in 2001, and recalling the models from the previous year for correction.

Amongst the changes from the original F650, the engine was upgraded to a 43 mm throttle body. The fuel is stored in an under-seat fuel tank, and a tank in the location of a conventional fuel tank housed the remote oil reservoir (for the dry sump), airbox and battery. This contributed to a lower centre of gravity, improving handling. The bodywork was redesigned by head BMW designer David Robb.

Due to the many vehicles sold, the F650GS developed a large aftermarket accessories range and a sizeable owner community. BMW also developed a large range of factory-original hard luggage for the bike.

== 2008: F650GS parallel-twin ==
In 2008, the single-cylinder F650GS was discontinued and replaced by an all-new design featuring a 798 cc, parallel twin engine. Intended as a new-generation replacement for the old bikes, the new motorcycle has retained the same F650GS model name, despite the fact that it has a larger engine.

== 2009: G650GS ==
In late 2008, BMW relaunched the original single-cylinder F650GS under the new name G650GS in the United States, South America, Greece and Australia. The new G650GS is essentially the 2007 single-cylinder F650GS brought back into production with some minor modifications and with the engine assembled by Loncin in China instead of Rotax in Austria, but still using parts manufactured by Rotax in Europe. The finished engines are shipped back to BMW in Germany where the bikes are assembled. G650GS models with the Chinese-assembled engines can be easily identified as the engines are painted black while in the earlier European-assembled engines were finished in silver. Before the bike was discontinued in 2007, there was a brief period when the engines were assembled by Kymco in Taiwan.

The G650GS received some upgrades over the F650GS of 2007: the engine now produces 3 additional horsepower (now 53 hp) and received a stronger 400 watt alternator. In the United States and Australia, ABS and heated grips are now standard equipment instead of "additional cost options" because BMW sells their bikes through dealers with nonnegotiable accessories packages added and included in the MSRP. An emergency services specific version of the G650GS, fitted with blue lights and sirens, is available from BMW Motorrad's Official and special duty vehicles division.

In 2010, at the EICMA show in Italy, BMW Motorrad announced the global availability of the G650GS with a slightly down-rated engine producing 35 kW (47 hp).

In 2012, BMW released the G650GS Sertão, which is a more off-road capable version. The Sertão fills the product gap that was left when the F650GS Dakar was discontinued in 2008.

== See also ==
- Simon and Monika Newbound - GS riders who hold the world record for motorcycle endurance.
- Benka Pulko - Slovenian motorcyclist who holds two Guinness World Records for her 5.5 year, 7 continent trip on an F650.
