= Suzuki DR650 =

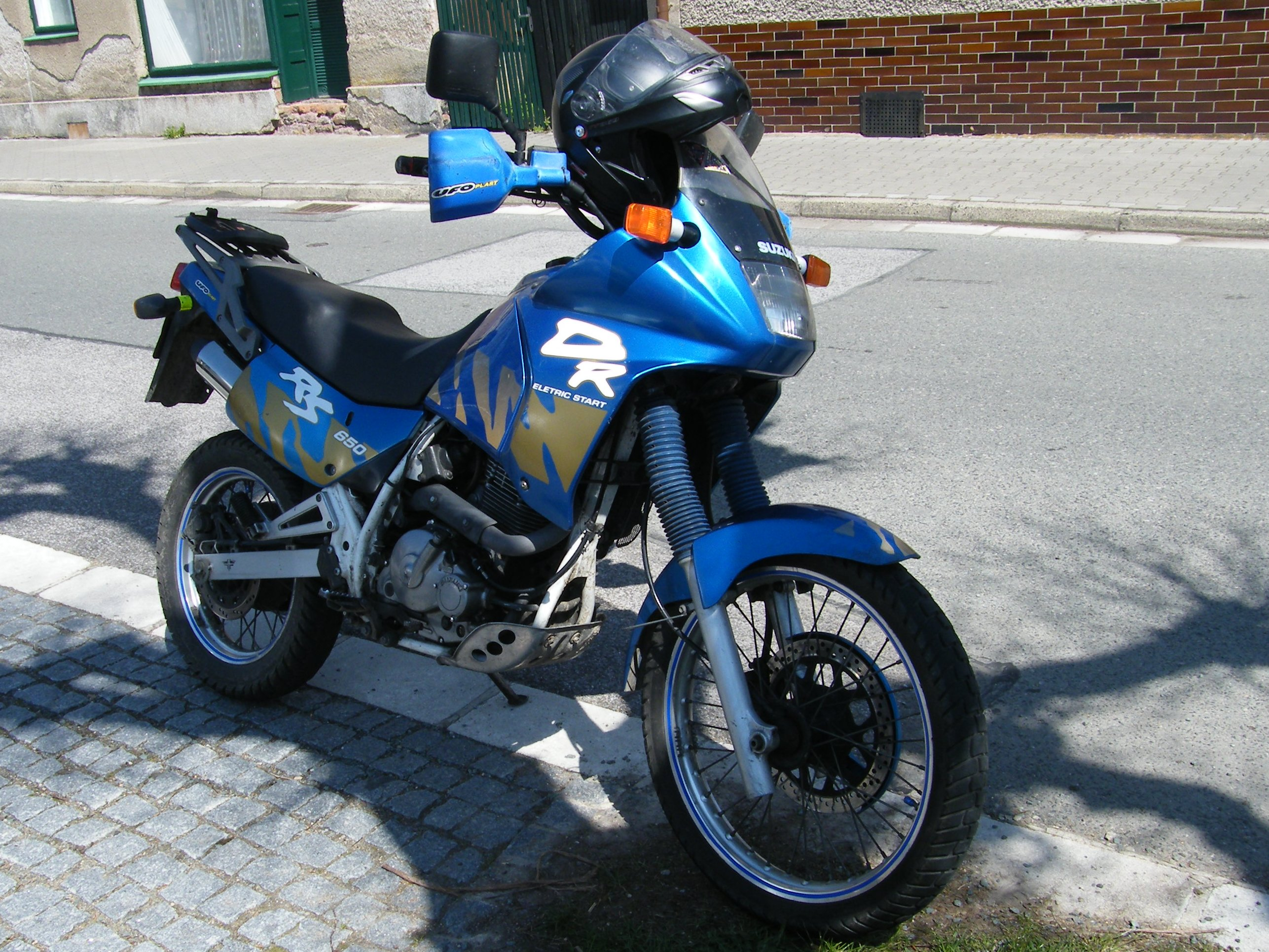
- Manufacturer: Suzuki
- Production: Since 1990
- Assembly: Japan
- Engine: 644 cc (39.3 cu in), 4-stroke, SOHC, 4-valve, air/oil cooled, single
- Bore / stroke: 100 mm × 82 mm (3.9 in × 3.2 in)
- Compression ratio: 9.5:1
- Transmission: 5-speed
- Suspension: Telescopic fork, link type swingarm
- Tires: F: 90/90-21; R: 120/90-17
- Dimensions: L: 2,255 mm (88.8 in); W: 865 mm (34.1 in); H: 1,195 mm (47.0 in)
- Seat height: 885 mm (34.8 in)
- Weight: 147 kg (324 lb) (dry); 166 kg (366 lb) (wet)
- Fuel capacity: 13 L (2.9 imp gal; 3.4 US gal)

The Suzuki DR650 is a 644 cc (39.3 cu in) single-cylinder dual-sport motorcycle made by Suzuki since 1990 as a replacement for the 590 cc (36 cu in) Suzuki DR600.

== History and development ==
The first models introduced were the Djebel/Dakar and the RS that were both kick start. In 1991, the first electric start model was introduced, namely the DR650RSE. In 1992 the Djebel/Dakar model was replaced with the DR650R. This model also saw improvements in the exhaust system and a smaller fuel tank.

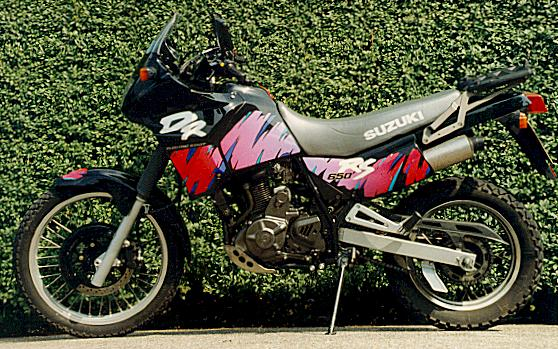
1992 model year

In 1996 the DR650SE was introduced, replacing the previous models. The engine was radically redesigned, reducing its power but allowing for more smooth delivery. The 2010+ SE model has the factory option of lowering the seat height by 40 mm for shorter riders. This involves lowering the front and rear suspension. A shorter side stand is also needed. The SE seat is narrow and firm. The SE has no tachometer but with standard gearing will cruise comfortably at 110–115 km/h. It has digital electronic CDI ignition and a coated cylinder bore to reduce weight. The exhaust pipe is made of stainless steel painted black to stop rusting. For a single cylinder bike, it is quite smooth due to the effective balancer shaft. The 40 mm Mikuni BST40 carb gives smooth power flow. It has electric-start only. The 21-inch front tire gives good directional control on gravel roads but is still fine for fast riding on sealed roads with the standard tires. The front fork is non-adjustable while the rear mono shock is adjustable for preload (through a tricky-to-access threaded collar) and for compression damping.

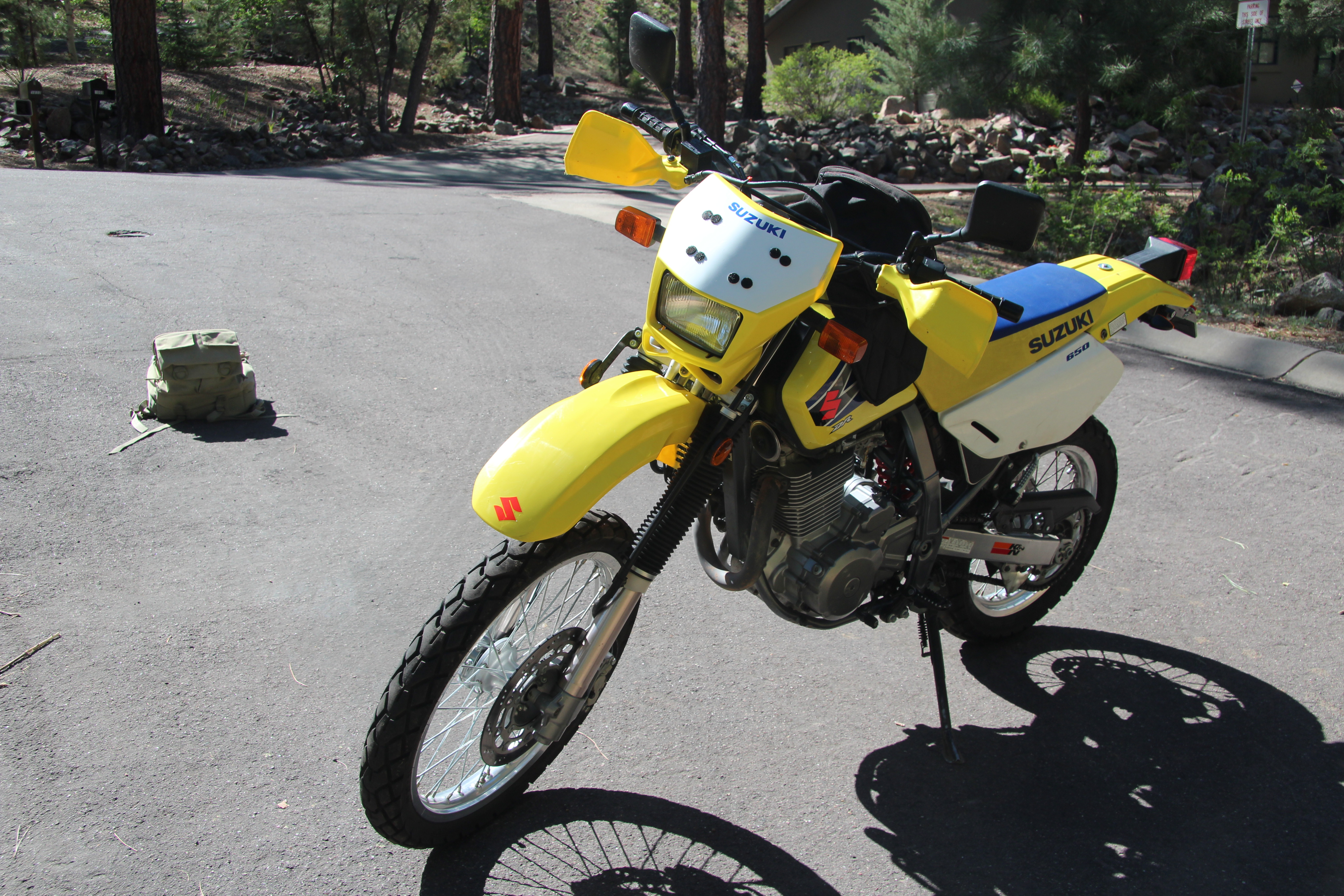
A 2000s model DR650SE with aftermarket tank bag

As of 2023, after 27 years, the model is still in production and was the best selling over-500cc bike in New Zealand. The bike is often in the top five sellers of any capacity bikes in New Zealand. The DR650 is also a big seller in Canada and previously in Australia. The DR650 is no longer available in Australia due to the new safety regulations which came into effect on 1 November 2021.

The DR650 has been unavailable in Europe since 2001 due to stringent emission regulations which make it virtually impossible for a non-fuel-injected machine to pass.
