= List of Columbia Pictures films (1970–1979) =

The following is a list of films produced and/or released by Columbia Pictures in 1970–1979. Most films listed here were distributed theatrically in the United States by the company's distribution division, Sony Pictures Releasing (formerly known as Columbia TriStar Film Distributors International) (1991–2005) and Warner-Columbia Films [1971-1987; a joint venture with Warner Bros.). It is one of the Big Five film studios. Columbia Pictures is a subsidiary of Japanese conglomerate Sony.

== 1970 ==
Release date	Title	Notes
January 1970	Land Raiders	Co-Production with Morningside Productions
February 4, 1970	The Looking Glass War	Co-Production with Frankovich Productions
February 5, 1970	The Virgin Soldiers	co-production with High Road Productions and Open Road Films
March 4, 1970	Loving	
March 18, 1970	The Liberation of L.B. Jones	co-production with Liberation Company
April 27, 1970	Riverrun	
May 13, 1970	Getting Straight	
May 27, 1970	Watermelon Man	
June 17, 1970	A Walk in the Spring Rain	
July 24, 1970	You Can't Win 'Em All	co-production with SRO
August 31, 1970	The Things of Life	
August 1970	The Olympics in Mexico	Mexican film
September 11, 1970	Sartana Kills Them All	co-production with Medusa Distribuzione
September 12, 1970	Five Easy Pieces	Nominee for the Academy Award for Best Picture; Nominee of the Golden Globe Award for Best Motion Picture – Drama
September 16, 1970	R.P.M.	
September 16, 1970	The Executioner	co-production with Ameran Films
October 12, 1970	The Mind of Mr. Soames	co-production with Amicus Productions
October 16, 1970	I Never Sang for My Father	Nominee of the Golden Globe Award for Best Motion Picture – Drama
October 23, 1970	Cromwell	co-production with Irving Allen Productions
November 3, 1970	The Owl and the Pussycat	Co-production with Rastar
November 18, 1970	I Walk the Line	
December 8, 1970	Husbands	Co-production with Faces Music
December 15, 1970	There's a Girl in My Soup	
December 16, 1970	Take a Girl Like You	co-production with Albion Film Distributors
December 25, 1970	The Lady in the Car with Glasses and a Gun	French film

== 1971 ==
Release date	Title	Notes
1971	House of Evil	Co-production with Azteca Films and Filmica Vergara S.A.
January 19, 1971	The Reckoning	
February 3, 1971	Doctors' Wives	Co-production with Frankovich Productions
February 21, 1971	Claire's Knee	
February 23, 1971	The Pursuit of Happiness	Co-production with E & R Productions and Belafonte Enterprises
March 12, 1971	The Buttercup Chain	co-production with Columbia British Productions
March 24, 1971	Brother John	
March 28, 1971	A Severed Head	
March 31, 1971	Waterloo	international distribution outside Latin America, Spain and the Soviet Union only; produced by Mosfilm and Dino de Laurentiis Cinematografica, North and Latin American and Spanish distribution by Paramount Pictures
March 1971	Isle of the Snake People	
April 2, 1971	Flight of the Doves	
April 8, 1971	The Professor	Mexican film; co-production with Posa Films
April 1971	The Incredible Invasion	
May 12, 1971	10 Rillington Place	Co-production with Filmways Pictures
June 6, 1971	Summertree	Co-production with The Bryna Company
June 9, 1971	A Man Called Sledge	
June 13, 1971	Drive, He Said	co-production with BBS Productions and Drive Productions Inc.
June 17, 1971	The Anderson Tapes	co-production with Robert M. Weitman Productions
June 23, 1971	Man and Boy	Co-production with J. Cornelius Crean Films Inc. and Jemmin Inc.
July 24, 1971	The Horsemen	
July 29, 1971	The Go-Between	North American, French, Australian, New Zealand and Japanese distribution only; co-co-production with EMI Films
August 18, 1971	Fools' Parade	co-production with Stanmore Productions and Penbar Productions, Inc.
August 27, 1971	The Love Machine	Co-production with Sujac Productions and Frankovich Productions
September 1, 1971	Creatures the World Forgot	Co-production with Hammer Film Productions
September 2, 1971	See No Evil	Co-production with Filmways Pictures
September 24, 1971	The Last Rebel	
September 29, 1971	The Brotherhood of Satan	co-production with Four Star Excelsior and LQ/JAF
September 1971	Fragment of Fear	
September 1971	Dad's Army	co-production with Norcon Film Productions
September 1971	Welcome to the Club	
October 1, 1971	A Safe Place	co-production with BBS Productions
October 13, 1971	Macbeth	
October 22, 1971	The Last Picture Show	Nominee for the Academy Award for Best Picture; Nominee of the Golden Globe Award for Best Motion Picture – Drama
October 28, 1971	Bless the Beasts and Children	
December 9, 1971	Happy Birthday, Wanda June	co-production with Red Lion, Sourdough and The Filmakers Group
December 13, 1971	Nicholas and Alexandra	Nominee for the Academy Award for Best Picture
December 17, 1971	$	Also known as Dollars, co-production with Frankovich Productions, Inc.

== 1972 ==
Release date	Title	Notes
January 1, 1972	J. W. Coop	Co-production with Robertson and Associates
January 14, 1972	Cisco Pike	
January 20, 1972	To Find a Man	Co-production with Rastar
January 21, 1972	X, Y, and Zee	Co-production with Zee Company, Original British title: Zee and Co.
March 21, 1972	Gumshoe	Co-production with Memorial Enterprises
April 28, 1972	Buck and the Preacher	
May 1972	Stand Up and Be Counted	co-production with Frankovich Productions
June 1, 1972	Glass Houses	
June 4, 1972	A Day in the Death of Joe Egg	British film
June 14, 1972	The Burglars	French & Italian film
July 6, 1972	Butterflies Are Free	Nominee of the Golden Globe Award for Best Motion Picture – Musical or Comedy
July 12, 1972	Living Free	British film
July 26, 1972	Fat City	Co-production with Rastar
August 3, 1972	The New Centurions	Co-production with Chartoff-Winkler Productions
August 16, 1972	Pope Joan	
August 22, 1972	And Now for Something Completely Different	Co-production with Playboy Productions
September 29, 1972	Love in the Afternoon	Co-production with Les Films du Losange
October 10, 1972	Young Winston	
October 12, 1972	The King of Marvin Gardens	
November 17, 1972	1776	Nominee of the Golden Globe Award for Best Motion Picture – Musical or Comedy
November 1972	Dirty Little Billy	
December 18, 1972	Images	distribution only; produced by Hemdale Film Corporation (Note: Owned by MGM)
December 19, 1972	Goodbye, Stork, Goodbye	Co-production with Impala, Daga Films and Kalender Films International
December 20, 1972	Black Gunn	

== 1973 ==
Release date	Title	Notes
1973	Andrei Rublev	U.S. and select international distribution only
January 31, 1973	Shamus	
February 4, 1973	Wattstax	co-production with Wolper Productions (Note: Co-owned by Warner Bros. and Teatro della Pace Films) and Stax Records
February 9, 1973	The Creeping Flesh	
February 12, 1973	A Reflection of Fear	
February 22, 1973	Turkish Delight	select international distribution only; produced by Rob Houwer Film Holland
March 17, 1973	Lost Horizon	co-production with Ross Hunter Productions
March 21, 1973	Godspell	
April 19, 1973	Love and Pain and the Whole Damn Thing	
May 25, 1973	Let the Good Times Roll	
June 10, 1973	The Hireling	
June 28, 1973	40 Carats	co-production with Frankovich Productions
July 3, 1973	Oklahoma Crude	co-production with Stanley Kramer Productions
July 18, 1973	Siddhartha	distribution only; produced by Lotus Films
August 1973	White Sister	Italian-Spanish-French film co-production with Compagnia Cinematografica Champion, Les Films Concordia Midega Film and CIPI Cinematografica S.A.
August 8, 1973	The Stone Killer	co-production with De Laurentiis International Manufacturing and Company S.p.A.
October 19, 1973	The Way We Were	co-production with Rastar and Tom Ward Enterprises
October 21, 1973	Summer Wishes, Winter Dreams	co-production with Rastar
December 5, 1973	Serpico	select international distribution only; distributed by Paramount Pictures in the U.S., U.K., France and Japan; produced by Produzion De Laurentiis International Manufacturing Company S.P.A. and Artists Entertainments Complex, Inc.
December 12, 1973	The Last Detail	co-production with Bright-Persky Associates and Acrobat Productions
December 14, 1973	Papillon	international distribution only; co-production with Allied Artists Pictures, Les Films Corona and General Production Company

== 1974 ==
Release date	Title	Notes
February 15, 1974	Crazy Joe	distribution outside Italy only; produced by Warner-Columbia Filmverleih, Dino de Laurentiis Cinematografica, Persky-Bright Productions, Produzione Cinematografiche Inter.Ma.Co and Tom Ward Enterprises
March 13, 1974	Lone Wolf and Cub: Baby Cart to Hades	U.S. distribution only; produced by Toho and Katsu Production Co. Ltd
April 5, 1974	The Golden Voyage of Sinbad	co-production by Morningside Productions and Ameran Films
April 10, 1974	Thomasine & Bushrod	co-production with Harvey Bernhard Enterprises
April 14, 1974	Lovin' Molly	North American distribution only; produced by S.J.F. Productions
May 1, 1974	The Lords of Flatbush	distribution only; produced by Ebbets Field
May 24, 1974	Chosen Survivors (Note: Owned by Disney (via 20th Century Studios))	distribution only; produced by Metromedia Producers Corporation, Alpine Productions Inc. and Churubusco Studios
May 1974	The Take	distribution only; produced by World Film Services
June 16, 1974	The Gravy Train	distribution only; produced by Tomorrow Entertainment
June 16, 1974	For Pete's Sake	co-production with Rastar and Barclay
June 1974	Birds Do It, Bees Do It	distribution only; produced by Romax Productions and Wolper Pictures
July 24, 1974	Death Wish (Note: Co-owned by StudioCanal)	select international distribution only; produced by Dino DeLaurentiis Cinematografica; distributed in the US and the UK by Paramount Pictures
August 7, 1974	California Split	co-production with Spelling-Goldberg and Won World
August 23, 1974	Buster and Billie	distribution only; produced by Black Creek Billie
August 1974	Open Season	North American, U.K., Irish, Australian and New Zealand distribution only; produced by Arpa Productions and Impala
September 25, 1974	The Mutations	distribution only; produced by Cyclone and Getty Pictures Corp.
October 9, 1974	Law and Disorder (Note: Owned by Bristol Myers Squibb)	U.S. distribution only; produced by Palomar Pictures International, Fadsin Cinema Associates, Leroy Street, Memorial Enterprises and Ugo
October 17, 1974	Liberation	U.S. distribution only
October 18, 1974	The Odessa File	co-production with John Woolf Productions, Domino Productions and Oceanic Filmproduktion
November 8, 1974	Confessions of a Window Cleaner	
December 1974	Emmanuelle	French film U.S. distribution only

== 1975 ==
Release date	Title	Notes
February 12, 1975	The Stepford Wives	Theatrical distributor only
March 13, 1975	Shampoo	Nominee of the Golden Globe Award for Best Motion Picture – Musical or Comedy
March 15, 1975	Funny Lady	Nominee of the Golden Globe Award for Best Motion Picture – Musical or Comedy; co-production with Rastar
March 19, 1975	Tommy	North American distribution only; produced by Hemdale Film Corporation; co-production with Robert Stigwood; Nominee of the Golden Globe Award for Best Motion Picture – Musical or Comedy
April 24, 1975	Touch and Go	French & Italian film co-production with Les Films Ariane and Vides Cinematografica
April 29, 1975	Aloha Bobby and Rose	Co-production with Cine Artists International
May 20, 1975	The Fortune	
May 22, 1975	Breakout	
May 22, 1975	The Wind and the Lion	International distribution only; co-production with Metro-Goldwyn-Mayer; US distribution by United Artists
June 20, 1975	Bite the Bullet	
July 16, 1975	White Line Fever	co-production by International Cinemedia Center and White Line Fever Syndicate
September 17, 1975	Swept Away	distribution only; remade in 2002
October 8, 1975	Hard Times	co-production with Lawrence Gordon Productions
October 12, 1975	Lies My Father Told Me	co-production with Canadian Film Development Corporation
December 18, 1975	The Man Who Would Be King	International distribution only; co-production with Allied Artists Pictures
December 25, 1975	Aaron Loves Angela	
December 25, 1975	The Black Bird	Co-production with Rastar

== 1976 ==
Release date	Title	Notes
February 8, 1976	Taxi Driver	Nominee for the Academy Award for Best Picture; co-production with Bill/Philips Productions and Italo/Judeo Productions; Inducted into the National Film Registry in 1994
February 13, 1976	Jack and the Beanstalk	U.S. distribution only; produced by Group TAC, Nippon Herald Films and Film-Rite Inc.
March 11, 1976	Robin and Marian	co-production with Rastar
April 16, 1976	Countdown at Kusini	distribution only; produced by DST Telecommunications, Nigeria Glipp Productions and Tam International Limited
April 1976	The Stranger and the Gunfighter	U.S. distribution only; produced by Champion Films, Compagnia Cinematografica Champion, Harbor Productions, Midega Film and The Shaw Brothers
May 5, 1976	Baby Blue Marine	co-production with Spelling-Goldberg Productions
May 16, 1976	Grizzly	international distribution only
May 26, 1976	Drive-In	distribution only; produced by George Litto Productions
May 1976	Watch Out, We're Mad	U.S. distribution only; produced by Filmayer, Capital Films and Rizzoli Film
June 6, 1976	The Last Woman	U.S. distribution only; produced by Les Productions Jaques Roitfield
June 17, 1976	Harry and Walter Go to New York	co-production with Devlin-Gittes/Tony Bill
June 23, 1976	Murder by Death	co-production with Rastar
July 1, 1976	The Minister and I	Mexican film; co-production with Rioma Films
July 14, 1976	Shadow of the Hawk	distribution only; produced by International Cinemedia Center, Rising Road, The Canadian Film Development Corporation and The Odeon Theatres
August 1, 1976	Obsession	distribution only; produced by Yellowbird Productions
September 17, 1976	The Front	co-production with Devon/Persky-Bright, Persky-Bright Productions and Rollins-Joffe Productions
November 22, 1976	The Savage Bees	UK and Netherlands theatrical distribution only; produced by Alan Landsburg Productions and Don Kirshner Productions. aired on NBC in U.S.
December 21, 1976	Nickelodeon	U.S. distribution only; co-production with British Lion Films and EMI Films

== 1977 ==
Release date	Title	Notes
February 9, 1977	Fun with Dick and Jane	
March 9, 1977	The Farmer	Co-production with Milway Productions
April 2, 1977	The Eagle Has Landed	U.S. distribution only; produced by ITC Entertainment (Note: Owned by ITV Studios) and Associated General Films
May 19, 1977	The Greatest	co-production with EMI Films and John Marshall Production
June 17, 1977	The Deep	co-production with Cascablanca Filmworks and EMI Films
August 5, 1977	March or Die	U.S. distribution only, produced by ITC Entertainment, Sir Lew Grade and Associated General Films
August 12, 1977	Sinbad and the Eye of the Tiger	Co-production with Andor Films
August 31, 1977	You Light Up My Life	Co-production with Mondial International Corporation
September 14, 1977	Spider-Man	International theatrical distribution only; Co-production with Danchuck Productions
September 29, 1977	Bobby Deerfield	U.S. distribution only; co-production with Warner Bros. and First Artists
November 16, 1977	Close Encounters of the Third Kind	co-production with Julia Philips and Michael Philips Productions and EMI Films; Inducted into the National Film Registry in 2007
December 7, 1977	The Incredible Melting Man	International theatrical distribution only; distributed in U.S. by American International Pictures; Co-production with Quartet Productions

== 1978 ==
Release date	Title	Notes
February 2, 1978	The Boys in Company C (Note: Owned by Fortune Star)	
February 1978	Remember My Name	Co-production with Lion's Gate Films
March 3, 1978	The Amsterdam Kill	
March 17, 1978	Casey's Shadow	Co-production with Rastar
April 28, 1978	The Patrolman	Mexican film; co-production with Rioma Films
May 19, 1978	Thank God It's Friday	Co-production with Cascablanca Filmworks and Motown Productions
May 24, 1978	If Ever I See You Again	
June 23, 1978	The Cheap Detective	distribution only; co-production with EMI Films and Rastar Pictures
July 28, 1978	The Buddy Holly Story	co-production with Innovisions and ECA
August 2, 1978	Eyes of Laura Mars	
September 29, 1978	Somebody Killed Her Husband	Co-production with Melvin Simon Productions and Fawcett-Major Productions
October 6, 1978	Midnight Express	Nominee for the Academy Award for Best Picture; Winner of the Golden Globe Award for Best Motion Picture – Drama; Co-production with Cascablanca Filmworks
December 8, 1978	Force 10 from Navarone	International distribution only; co-production with Navarone Productions
December 15, 1978	California Suite	Nominee of the Golden Globe Award for Best Motion Picture – Musical or Comedy; co-production with Rastar
December 21, 1978	Spider-Man Strikes Back	International theatrical distribution only; Co-production with Danchuck Productions
December 31, 1978	Ice Castles	

== 1979 ==
Release date	Title	Notes
February 9, 1979	Hardcore	
February 9, 1979	When You Comin' Back, Red Ryder?	co-production with Melvin Simon Productions
March 2, 1979	Fast Break (Note: Owned by Lionsgate)	distribution only; co-production with Kings Road Entertainment
March 16, 1979	The China Syndrome	co-production with Melvin Simon Productions
April 1979	Ashanti	international distribution only
April 6, 1979	The Fifth Musketeer	
May 18, 1979	Hanover Street	co-production with Hanover Street Productions
May 1979	Ravagers	
June 8, 1979	Game of Death	U.S. theatrical distribution only
June 22, 1979	Nightwing	
July 13, 1979	Just You and Me, Kid	
July 13, 1979	Lost and Found	
July 27, 1979	The Villain	Co-production with Rastar
August 10, 1979	No Sex Please, We're British	
August 10, 1979	The National Health	co-production with Virgin Films
August 10, 1979	Hot Stuff	Co-production with Rastar
September 28, 1979	The American Success Company	North American, U.K. and Irish distribution only
September 28, 1979	The Legacy	U.K. and Irish theatrical distribution only
October 19, 1979	...And Justice for All	
October 26, 1979	When a Stranger Calls (Note: Distribution rights currently owned by Quiver Distribution)	distribution only
October 1979	Skatetown, U.S.A.	Co-production with Rastar
December 14, 1979	1941	television and international theatrical distribution only; co-production with A-Team Productions and Universal Pictures
December 14, 1979	Chapter Two	Co-production with Rastar
December 19, 1979	Kramer vs. Kramer	Winner of the Academy Award for Best Picture; Winner of the Golden Globe Award for Best Motion Picture – Drama
December 20, 1979	All That Jazz	Nominee of the Academy Award for Best Picture; International theatrical distribution only; co-production with 20th Century Fox (International); Inducted into the National Film Registry in 2001
December 21, 1979	The Electric Horseman (Note: Owned by Universal Pictures)	U.S. distribution only; co-production with Universal Pictures, Rastar Productions and Wildwood Productions

== See also ==
- List of film serials by studio § Columbia Pictures
- Columbia Pictures
- List of TriStar Pictures films
- List of Screen Gems films
- Sony Pictures Classics
- Category:Lists of films by studio
