= Jack Knight (actor) =

American film, stage and television actor

- Knight in 1980
- Born: John Francis Knight III; February 26, 1938; Boston, Massachusetts, U.S.
- Died: June 29, 2025 (aged 87)
- Occupations: Film, stage and television actor
- Political party: Democratic
- Spouse: Bonnie Knight

John Francis Knight III (February 26, 1938 – June 29, 2025) was an American film, stage and television actor. He was best known for playing the recurring role of Jack in the first season of the American sitcom television series Cheers.

== Early life and career ==
Knight was born in Boston, Massachusetts. He played college decathlon at the University of Massachusetts, and earned his BA degree in speech in 1960. He also played softball in New York. He began his screen career in 1967, appearing in the ABC crime drama television series N.Y.P.D. In 1968, he appeared in the film Rosemary's Baby.

Knight playing softball in 1974

Later in his career, in 1973, Knight starred as Bummy Pfitzer in the NBC sitcom television series Lotsa Luck, starring along with Dom DeLuise, Kathleen Freeman, Wynn Irwin and Beverly Sanders. After the series ended in 1974, he guest-starred in television programs including James at 16, B. J. and the Bear (and its spin-off The Misadventures of Sheriff Lobo), Don't Trust the B— in Apartment 23, The Jeffersons, Emergency!, The Jeffersons, Charlie's Angels and The Rockford Files, and played the recurring role of Jack in the first season of the NBC sitcom television series Cheers. He also appeared in films such as L.A. Confidential, Wicked, Wicked, Catch Me If You Can and The Long Goodbye. During his screen career, he performed on stage, and he played Ted Kennedy in the stage play Chappaquiddick.

Knight retired from acting in 2016, last appearing in the film Get a Job.

== Personal life and death ==
Knight was married to Bonnie. According to The Record, he was an Irish Catholic, and a member of the Democratic Party.

Knight died on June 29, 2025, at the age of 87.
