= Joan Goodfellow =

American actor

- Occupations: Film, television, stage actress; singer (mezzo-soprano)
- Years active: 1972–present
- Spouse: Daniel T. Faircloth (m. 1974; div. 1979)
- Children: 1

Joan Goodfellow is an American actress and singer who appeared on stage, screen, and television throughout the 1970s and 1980s. Best known for her performance in Buster and Billie (1974), she also appeared in the TV-movies Returning Home (1975) and Amateur Night at the Dixie Bar and Grill (1979). Her final film was Victor Nuñez's A Flash of Green in 1984. On stage, she was part of the original cast of Neil Simon's Biloxi Blues (1985).

Joan Goodfellow attended Brandywine High School, participating in theater arts productions, including The King and I, in which she sang and acted the lead role of Anna. She also performed in Beauty and the Beast just before her graduation in 1968.

Goodfellow attended the University of Delaware, majoring in theater and dramatic arts. While there, she performed supporting roles in various plays, including Georges Feydeau's A Flea in Her Ear and G. B. Shaw's Arms and the Man. In 1970, she joined with other student/actors to present George Tabori's Brecht on Brecht. Later, Goodfellow took the female lead in the school's production of Guys and Dolls. In Fall 1970, Goodfellow transferred to the American Academy of Dramatic Arts in New York. Upon graduating in 1972, she received a call from her agent, who had secured an audition for her in a new MGM motion picture based on Sue Grafton's 1969 novel The Lolly-Madonna War.

== Initial film and television performances (1972–1974) ==
Goodfellow's tryout landed her in the film, later to be re-dubbed Lolly-Madonna XXX. It starred Rod Steiger and Robert Ryan as patriarchs of two rival families in the Tennessee hills. Their feud turns into all-out war when the daughter of one family, Sister E (played by Goodfellow), is assaulted by two sons from the other clan. Of her performance, a Daily Variety reviewer praised Goodfellow for bringing about some of "the finest dramatic moments seen on film." And author/essayist Harlan Ellison, who called Lolly-Madonna "one of the most obstinately compelling films I've ever seen," singled out her performance as "skillful and highly promising of a long and honorable career. The rape scene...is a directorial and acting masterpiece; Ms. Goodfellow manages to convey all the terror and bravery of a bird stalked by ruthless hunters. I commend her to your attention." Regarding her memories of making the film, Goodfellow later recalled, "We had a wonderful time. We boogied and played guitar, and Robert Ryan played the fiddle." She also became close friends with one of her co-stars Season Hubley, who at the time was another newcomer to films. According to Goodfellow, she and Hubley "lived together in a red convertible '65 Galaxie 500 with two dogs. We were pretty wild, two crazy young kids in Hollywood. We were having a hoot."

Goodfellow's next assignment was a small role in a TV-movie western-comedy, The Gun and the Pulpit, which debuted on ABC's Movie of the Week the spring of 1974. The film starred Marjoe Gortner and was helmed by Daniel Petrie, a veteran director who, in his next film, would cast Goodfellow in the most prominent role of her career.

== A hit movie and critical praise (1974) ==
When asked about her character in a new teen romance Buster and Billie, Goodfellow replied, "I play a socially retarded chick." Her character, Billie Jo Truluck, is the proverbial girl from the other side of the tracks with a reputation every boy knows. Craving some form of acknowledgement from her high-school peers, the quiet, introverted Billie accedes to nocturnal liaisons with sex-starved male classmates. Consequently, she increases her own marginalization at school. As Time magazine's reviewer observed, "Billie may not be quite all there." Set in 1948 rural Georgia, this sentimental, ironic story of how the outcast Billie and the popular Buster Lane (Jan-Michael Vincent) fall in love became a surprise box-office hit during the summer of 1974, when it played mostly in small-city venues before making its New York premiere in late August. Critical reaction, however, was mostly tepid, due to an outburst of violence in the film's final scenes.

The performers, however, received favorable notices, especially the two leads. According to the St. Paul Pioneer Press, "Jan-Michael Vincent is a talented and handsome performer who does excellent work here. As Billie, Joan Goodfellow is – to use an overworked adjective – perfect." The members of Goodfellow's hometown press were especially complimentary. One critic wrote that "[s]he has a tough part because she doesn't talk much for a lead character. However, her gestures realistically portray a poor, clumsy girl trying to find something besides sex." And another local scribe asserted:

Joan's work in a difficult role, where meaningful gestures and expressions rather than crisp readings of lines are required, is just plain excellent. Her acting is certainly of a caliber of many of the supporting-actress [Oscar] nominations of past years, and now Columbia Pictures should move into the publicity campaign needed to bring that performance into the public spotlight."

However, when a Philadelphia theater chain asked Columbia to pay Goodfellow's transportation costs for a promotional tour, the studio showed no interest. Additionally, no new film offers came her way. Still, during a time when she was enjoying critical recognition, Goodfellow celebrated a personal milestone with her marriage to country music composer and performer Daniel Faircloth in June 1974. Afterwards, the couple moved to Malibu, California. Upon hearing news of her marriage, Jan-Michael Vincent feared that Goodfellow might give up acting. While promoting his film White Line Fever (1975), he reflected on making Buster and Billie, telling one interviewer:

Joan Goodfellow was so good as the girl [Billie]...and I think she'll act some more. She just doesn't look for work hard enough. I'd love to work with her again. She's such a funky lady, and then you discover these weird things about her, like she's a trained opera singer – and never told anybody!

By 1987, over a decade after the theatrical release of Buster and Billie, the film wound up playing on local and independent television stations in various cities. One such market was Dallas, where local film critic Philip Wuntch wrote a short blurb for the film's TV listing in the Dallas Morning News. It read, "Very sweet, very sad teen romance. Joan Goodfellow makes a poignant impression, and what ever happened to her anyway?" To answer that question would require examining her career after 1974.

== Later work in film and television (1975–1984) ==
This phase of Goodfellow's career began with her third Daniel Petrie film, a TV-movie remake of the Academy Award-winning The Best Years of Our Lives (1946), titled Returning Home (1975). This was a 90-minute pilot for a proposed television series but failed to attract interest. Then later in 1975, Goodfellow performed the minor role of a Brooklyn woman who barely escapes an attempted rape/murder in the TV-movie Death Scream. But there were still no offers for her to perform leading parts in feature-films. Nevertheless, she made a guest appearance in the television series Police Woman in a segment dealing with spousal abuse. In addition, she co-starred alongside Ed Lauter in a two-part episode of Police Story in early 1976. It was at this time, however, that the actress was expecting a child, and some of the offers she did begin receiving from the studios were too physically demanding for one in her condition. According to Goodfellow's father, his daughter had even "tried out for several 'pregnant parts' but found it was nearly impossible for a woman who is actually pregnant to play such roles." Later in 1976, she gave birth to a son, Daniel Steed Faircloth.

In 1978, Goodfellow was reunited with Richard C. Sarafian, the director of Lolly-Madonna, for a minor supporting role in Sunburn. The film was made in Acapulco and featured Farrah Fawcett and Joan Collins, two major stars of that era. In 1979, she appeared in the TV-movie, Amateur Night at the Dixie Bar and Grill, a series of character vignettes, all taking place in a country road house on a rainy evening. According to one critic, the film was a "reasonably innocuous" effort. Yet many notable performers wandered back and forth through various scenes, including Dennis Quaid, Tanya Tucker, Candy Clark, Sheree North, and Henry Gibson. Goodfellow, for once, was allowed a song. She delivers an emotional ballad, the lyrics explaining why her character, a girl-next-door waitress obsessed with soap operas and mood rings, harbors a crush for a short-tempered roustabout, played by Don Johnson. About this time, Goodfellow, living in West Los Angeles with her 3-year-old son, was divorced from her husband, who would later move to Nashville to continue his songwriting and performing career.

In 1981, after completing work in a feminist-themed sports TV-movie, The Oklahoma City Dolls, she played a "blonde bombshell" nurse named BeeBee Darnell in an episode of the Peter Cook situation comedyThe Two of Us. The next year, she made another sitcom appearance, this time in the Erma Bombeck-inspired series Maggie. But one of her more notable appearances occurred when casting director Judy Courtney, who had seen Goodfellow audition for a part in Tootsie (1982), urged her to test for a new movie, A Flash of Green, based on a John D. MacDonald novel about small-town political corruption. This 1984 opus was her final film credit.

== Broadway success and later (1985–present) ==
After living and working in California for a decade, Goodfellow moved back east in order to re-evaluate her career. During an interview with a Wilmington reporter, she recalled her Hollywood experiences:

I thought I would be eaten alive. I wasn't ready for all the responsibility at the time. I'll always want to do film and I'll always love the theater; it depends on what happens first. And I'll always be able to sing; that's what I want to do...I haven't been terribly ambitious. This is a basically immoral business. I'm very lucky I've never done anything that I'm horribly ashamed of. But there's nothing you can do about it if you're starving and you need work...It's a very heart-breaking, very difficult, very scary business that will eat you alive, no questions asked. You really have to know what you're getting into, and I don't know that I have until now. But I have the feeling I'm here for the long pull.

After brief work in the TV soap opera One Life to Live, Goodfellow was cast as understudy for the role of Rowena, a Southern prostitute, in Neil Simon's Biloxi Blues in 1985. Two years later, when the play toured the country, she became a regular part of the cast when it was staged in such venues as Theater On The Square in San Francisco. Later, she appeared as a guest soloist with the Performing Arts Society of Delaware chorus and orchestra and as part of a Wilmington "Best of Broadway" production.

In more recent years, Goodfellow has taught acting at Delaware Technical Community College and has sung in mezzo-soprano roles with OperaDelaware. In late 1993, she obtained a part in a small independent film, appearing as one of two evil stepsisters in Sharon Baker's never-released updating of the Cinderella story, relocated to a karaoke bar. Additionally, she performed in The Student Prince at Wilmington's Grand Opera House in 1997; she was cited as acting "the nonsinging role of a class-conscious duchess." And in 2011, she sang the part of Olga in an OperaDelaware production of Lehár's The Merry Widow. Joan Goodfellow still resides in the Wilmington area, making occasional appearances on stage in local productions.

== Feature films and TV-movies ==
Release year	Title	Role	Director	Co-Performers
1973	Lolly-Madonna XXX	Sister E	Richard C. Sarafian	Rod Steiger, Robert Ryan, Scott Wilson, Ed Lauter
1974	The Gun and the Pulpit (TV-movie)	Dixie	Daniel Petrie	Marjoe Gortner, Estelle Parsons, Pamela Sue Martin
1974	Buster and Billie	Billie Jo Truluck	Daniel Petrie	Jan-Michael Vincent, Pamela Sue Martin, Robert Englund
1975	Returning Home (TV-movie)	Peggy Stephenson	Daniel Petrie	Dabney Coleman, Tom Selleck, Whitney Blake
1975	Death Scream (TV-movie)	Mrs. Daniels	Richard T. Heffron	Raul Julia, John P. Ryan, Les Lannom
1979	Amateur Night at the Dixie Bar and Grill (TV-movie)	Marcy	Joel Schumacher	Victor French, Louise Latham, Candy Clark
1979	Sunburn	Joanna	Richard C. Sarafian	Farrah Fawcett, Charles Grodin, Joan Collins
1980	Trouble in High Timber Country (TV-movie)	Lisa	Vincent Sherman	Eddie Albert, Martin Kove, James Sloyan
1981	The Oklahoma City Dolls (TV-movie)	Michael Ann	E. W. Swackhamer	Susan Blakely, Ronee Blakley, Savannah Smith
1984	A Flash of Green	Mitchie	Victor Nuñez	Ed Harris, Blair Brown, Richard Jordan

== Television episodes ==
Premiere date	Show	Episode	Role	Co-performers
1975-03-07	Police Woman	"Bloody Nose"	Hilary Barry	Angie Dickinson, Earl Holliman, David Birney
1976-01-09/1976-01-16	Police Story	"Odyssey of Death" (Parts 1 & 2)	Bobbie-Lou	Robert Stack, Brock Peters, Ed Lauter
1977-05-13	Quincy, M.E.	"Valleyview"	Miss Gordon	Jack Klugman, Ed Begley, Jr., Christopher Connelly
1977-05-17	McLaren's Riders	(Unsold pilot project)	Wanda	James Best, Brad Davis, George DiCenzo
1980	From Here to Eternity (TV series)	Various episodes	Lt. Rosemary Clark	William Devane, Roy Thinnes, Kim Basinger
1981-04-27	The Two of Us	"Weekend Away"	Bee Bee Darnell	Peter Cook, Richard Schaal, Mimi Kennedy
1982-05-07	Maggie	"Alienation of Affection"	Gloria	Miriam Flynn, James Hampton, Conchata Ferrell
