= Rastar =

American film production company

- Type: Subsidiary
- Founded: 1966; 60 years ago
- Founder: Ray Stark
- Defunct: 2004; 22 years ago
- Fate: Closed
- Products: Motion pictures Television
- Parent: Columbia Pictures (1974–2004)
- Divisions: Rastar Films; Rastar Features; Rastar Television; Rastar Productions; Rastar Animation

Rastar was an American film production company founded in 1966 by Hollywood producer Ray Stark, who was involved in most of its productions. Its first film was 1968's Funny Girl.

The company also produced films in the 1970s and 1980s, such as The Owl and the Pussycat, The Way We Were, Summer Wishes, Winter Dreams, Murder by Death, The Goodbye Girl, Seems Like Old Times, Annie and Blue Thunder. The company's most notable films include Steel Magnolias and the Smokey and the Bandit trio of films. 1996's Harriet the Spy and 2000's Alley Cats Strike, a film made for Disney Channel, were two of its last endeavors.

== History ==
In 1966, Ray Stark grew frustrated, left Seven Arts Productions, due to the hatedom of the 10 of the 11 films he was producing, to form an independent production company, Rastar, to produce feature films, stage plays and television shows in the model Seven Arts Productions had. He set up his business at Columbia Pictures in 1966 to form a nearly 30-year partnership. The company produced films based on Neil Simon's plays, as well as star vehicles for Barbra Streisand. The company begin venturing into television in 1969.

In 1974, Rastar was acquired by Columbia Pictures, which included Rastar Productions, Rastar Pictures, Rastar Features, and Rastar Television. Ray Stark then founded Rastar Films, the reincarnation of Rastar Pictures and it was acquired by Columbia Pictures in 1980. In 1981, Rastar Television bought out the rights to Robert Ripley's collection Believe It or Not! for Columbia Pictures Television, whhich aired in 1982.

In 1984, Rastar started producing movies for Tri-Star Pictures, a joint venture of Columbia, HBO and CBS. The first films to come out were Peggy Sue Got Married and Nothing in Common. In 1985, it partnered with Ted Turner to produce television movies.

Stark grew sour of its relations with Columbia when David Puttnam was appointed head of Columbia in 1986, but his successor Dawn Steel, who joined the studio in 1987, was more lenient than Puttnam and resumed relations with Rastar. In 1986, Rastar agreed to a distribution deal with Universal Pictures in order to help finance more projects. In late 1986, the company was nearly sold to Hal Roach Studios, but the deal failed in early 1987.

In 1989, Stark teamed up with Daniel Melnick of The IndieProd Company, to form a joint venture production company, Rastar/IndieProd, which was part of Carolco Pictures. The venture was dissolved in 1991. In 1993, the company begin making movies with Savoy Pictures.

In 1996, executives Lawrence Turman and John Morrissey left Rastar to form their independent production company The Turman/Morrisey Company, at Columbia Pictures, with Stark's help. The company closed its operations in 2004 when Ray Stark died.

== Productions ==
=== Film ===
==== 1960s ====
Title	Release date	Distributor	Budget	Box office
Funny Girl	September 18, 1968	Columbia Pictures	$14.1 million	$58.7 million

==== 1970s ====
Title	Release date	Distributor	Notes	Budget	Box office
The Owl and the Pussycat	November 3, 1970	Columbia Pictures		N/A	$23.6 million
To Find a Man	January 20, 1972	Columbia Pictures		N/A	N/A
Fat City	July 26, 1972	Columbia Pictures		N/A	N/A
The Way We Were	October 19, 1973	Columbia Pictures		$5 million	$50 million
Summer Wishes, Winter Dreams	October 21, 1973	Columbia Pictures		N/A	N/A
For Pete's Sake	June 26, 1974	Columbia Pictures		$4–5 million	$11 million
Funny Lady	March 12, 1975	Columbia Pictures		$8.5 million	$40.1 million
The Sunshine Boys	November 6, 1975	United Artists	co-production with Metro-Goldwyn-Mayer	N/A	N/A
The Black Bird	December 25, 1975	Columbia Pictures		N/A	N/A
Robin and Marian	March 11, 1976	Columbia Pictures		N/A	N/A
Murder by Death	June 23, 1976	Columbia Pictures		N/A	$32.5 million
Smokey and the Bandit	July 29, 1977	Universal Pictures		$4.3 million	$127 million
The Goodbye Girl	November 30, 1977	Warner Bros.	co-production with Metro-Goldwyn-Mayer	N/A	$102 million
Casey's Shadow	March 17, 1978	Columbia Pictures		N/A	$8 million
The Cheap Detective	June 23, 1978	Columbia Pictures	co-production with EMI Films	$5–6 million	$28.2 million
California Suite	December 22, 1978	Columbia Pictures		N/A	$42.9 million
The Villain	July 27, 1979	Columbia Pictures		$4.5-6 million	$9.8 million
Hot Stuff	August 10, 1979	Columbia Pictures		N/A	N/A
Skatetown, U.S.A.	October 1979	Columbia Pictures		N/A	$2.35 million
Chapter Two	December 14, 1979	Columbia Pictures		$9–10 million	$30 million
The Electric Horseman	December 21, 1979	Columbia Pictures (U.S. theatrical and television); Universal Pictures (International and home video)	co-production with Wildwood Enterprises	$12.5 million	$61.8 million

==== 1980s ====
Title	Release date	Distributor	Notes	Budget	Box office
Touched by Love	April 17, 1980	Columbia Pictures		$2.5 million	N/A
The Hunter	August 1, 1980	Paramount Pictures	co-production with Mort Engelberg Productions	N/A	$16.3 million
Smokey and the Bandit II	August 15, 1980	Universal Pictures	co-production with Mort Engelberg Productions	$17 million	$66.1 million
Somewhere in Time	October 3, 1980	Universal Pictures	co-production with Stephen Deutsch Productions	$4 million	$9.7 million
It's My Turn	October 11, 1980	Columbia Pictures		N/A	$11 million
The Competition	December 3, 1980	Columbia Pictures		$10.1 million	$14.3 million
Seems Like Old Times	December 19, 1980	Columbia Pictures		N/A	$44 million
Nobody's Perfekt	August 14, 1981	Columbia Pictures	co-production with Mort Engelberg Productions	N/A	N/A
Only When I Laugh	September 23, 1981	Columbia Pictures		N/A	$25.5 million
Richard Pryor: Live on the Sunset Strip	March 12, 1982	Columbia Pictures		$4.5 million	$36.2 million
Wrong Is Right	April 14, 1982	Columbia Pictures		$10 million	$3.5 million
Annie	May 21, 1982	Columbia Pictures		$35 million	$57.1 million
The Toy	December 10, 1982	Columbia Pictures		$17 million	$47.1 million
Blue Thunder	May 13, 1983	Columbia Pictures		$22 million	$42.3 million
The Survivors	June 22, 1983	Columbia Pictures		$15 million	$14 million
Sylvester	March 15, 1985	Columbia Pictures		N/A	$385,687
The Slugger's Wife	March 29, 1985	Columbia Pictures		$19 million	$1.3 million
Violets Are Blue	April 25, 1986	Columbia Pictures		$10 million	$4.7 million
Nothing in Common	July 30, 1986	Tri-Star Pictures	co-production with Delphi Films	$12 million	$32.3 million
Peggy Sue Got Married	October 10, 1986	Tri-Star Pictures	co-production with American Zoetrope and Delphi V Productions	$18 million	$41.5 million
Where are The Children?	November 15, 1986	Columbia Pictures	co-production with Braun Entertainment Group and Delphi V Productions	N/A	N/A
Brighton Beach Memoirs	December 25, 1986	Universal Pictures		$18 million	$11.9 million
The Secret of My Success	April 10, 1987	Universal Pictures		$12 million	$111 million
Amazing Grace and Chuck	May 22, 1987	Tri-Star Pictures		N/A	$5.4 million
Biloxi Blues	March 25, 1988	Universal Pictures		$17 million	$57.1 million
Steel Magnolias	November 15, 1989	Tri-Star Pictures		$15 million	$96.8 million

==== 1990s ====
Title	Release date	Distributor	Notes	Budget	Box office
Revenge	February 16, 1990	Columbia Pictures (Select territories and home video); New World Pictures (International and streaming)		$22 million	$26.6 million
White Hunter Black Heart	September 14, 1990	Warner Bros. Pictures		$24 million	$2 million
Lost in Yonkers	May 14, 1993	Columbia Pictures		$15 million	$9 million
Mr. Jones	October 8, 1993	TriStar Pictures		$25 million	$8.3 million
Dr. Jekyll and Ms. Hyde	August 25, 1995	Savoy Pictures (United States); Rank Film Distributors (International)	co-production with Leider-Shapiro Productions and PVM Entertainment	$8 million	$3 million
Harriet the Spy	July 10, 1996	Paramount Pictures	co-production with Nickelodeon Movies	$12 million	$26.6 million
To Gillian on Her 37th Birthday	October 18, 1996	Triumph Films		N/A	$4.1 million
Random Hearts	October 8, 1999	Columbia Pictures	co-production with Mirage Enterprises	$64 million	$74.6 million

=== Television ===
==== Television shows ====
Title	Years	Network	Notes
Ripley's Believe It or Not!	1982–1986	ABC	co-production with Haley-Lyon Productions and Columbia Pictures Television
Blue Thunder	1984	ABC	co-production with Public Arts, Inc. and Columbia Pictures Television
Nothing in Common	1987	NBC	co-production with Tri-Star Television
The Hollywood Game	1992	CBS	co-production with Pasetta Productions and CBS Entertainment Productions

==== Television pilots/movies ====
Title	Release date	Network	Notes
The Cheap Detective	June 3, 1980	NBC	co-production with Columbia Pictures Television
Sixty Years of Seduction	May 4, 1981	ABC	
Lights, Camera, Annie!	March 7, 1982	PBS	co-production with Kaleidoscope Films and Columbia Pictures
Goodbye Doesn't Mean Forever	May 28, 1982	NBC	co-production with MGM Television and Warner Bros. Television
A Reason to Live	January 7, 1985	NBC	co-production with Rick Dawn Enterprises and Robert Papazian Productions
Anna Karenina	March 26, 1985	CBS	co-production with Colgems Productions Limited
Once Upon a Texas Train	January 3, 1988	CBS	co-production with Robert Papazian Productions and Brigade Productions
Baja Oklahoma	February 20, 1988	HBO	co-production with HBO Pictures
Steel Magnolias	August 17, 1990	CBS	co-production with Nikndaph Productions and Columbia Pictures Television
Opposites Attract	October 17, 1990	NBC	co-production with Von Zerneck-Sertner Films and Bar-Gene Productions
Barbarians at the Gate	March 20, 1993	HBO	co-production with HBO Pictures and Columbia Pictures Television
Annie: A Royal Adventure!	November 18, 1995	ABC	co-production with TriStar Television
Earthly Possessions	March 20, 1999	HBO	co-production with HBO Pictures
Alley Cats Strike	March 18, 2000	Disney Channel	co-production with Walt Disney Television
