= The Hunter (1980 film) =

1980 film directed by Buzz Kulik

- Film poster for The Hunter
- Directed by: Buzz Kulik
- Written by: Ted Leighton; Peter Hyams
- Based on: The Hunter (1976 book) by Christopher Keane
- Produced by: Mort Engelberg
- Starring: Steve McQueen; Eli Wallach; Kathryn Harrold; LeVar Burton; Ben Johnson
- Cinematography: Fred J. Koenekamp
- Edited by: Robert L. Wolfe
- Music by: Michel Legrand
- Production company: Rastar; Mort Engelberg Productions
- Distributed by: Paramount Pictures
- Release date: August 1, 1980
- Running time: 97 minutes
- Country: United States
- Language: English
- Box office: $16.3 million

The Hunter is a 1980 American biographical action-thriller film directed by Buzz Kulik and starring Steve McQueen, along with Eli Wallach, Kathryn Harrold, LeVar Burton, Ben Johnson and Richard Venture. It is based on the life and career of bounty hunter Ralph "Papa" Thorson, and is adapted from Christopher Keane's biography of Thorson.

The film was released by Paramount Pictures on August 1, 1980. The Hunter was McQueen's final role before his death in November of that year, as well as the final theatrical film directed by Kulik.

== Plot ==
Ralph "Papa" Thorson arrives in a small town in Illinois where, despite being a terrible driver, he captures bail fugitive Tommy Price. Thorson drives to Houston to bring in a dangerous hooligan named Billie Joe, whose kinfolk include Sheriff Strong, a corrupt redneck lawman who warns Thorson not to get involved. Papa ignores him and ends up in a destructive fight with the enormous fugitive, but succeeds in apprehending him.

Thorson drives Tommy Price and Billie Joe back to Los Angeles, where he collects his reward. However, Thorson vouches for Price. Price soon begins fixing things at Thorson's house and becomes one of the many acquaintances who hang out there.

At home, Thorson is an old-fashioned guy who has a love of antique toys and classical music. His schoolteacher girlfriend Dotty is pregnant and would like "Papa" to be there for her when the baby is born, but his job continually keeps him on the road.

Thorson works for elderly bail bondsman Ritchie Blumenthal, who sends him on dangerous assignments to chase down fugitives in all parts of the U.S. Thorson is stalked by psychotic killer Rocco Mason, who was one of Thorson's previous retrievals.

Thorson is sent to rural Nebraska to bring back two fugitives, the Branch brothers. He flies to Nebraska and rents a car. At the Branch farmhouse, the brothers steal his rental car and try to kill him with dynamite. Thorson commandeers a combine harvester and chases them through a cornfield. A stick of dynamite they dropped earlier blows up the car. They survive, albeit badly injured. Thorson returns to the local airport with the destroyed car on a trailer, and puts the Branch brothers on a plane to Los Angeles.

Meanwhile, Rocco Mason terrorizes Dotty at her workplace. Thorson tries to protect her, but she instead tries to make him give up his bounty hunter way of life and to take her to a Lamaze class. When Thorson grows tired of the demands, he tells Dotty he wishes she would've had an abortion. She threatens to leave him.

Thorson's police friend, Captain Spota, dies by suicide after he is investigated for dealing illegal drugs from the department's evidence rooms. Thorson starts drinking more heavily.

Blumenthal sends Thorson to a Chicago slum to pick up fugitive Anthony Bernardo, a dangerous ex-con. Thorson and Bernardo exchange gunfire at an apartment building. Thorson chases Bernardo on foot through the streets to an elevated train, where Thorson is forced to climb on the roof of the moving train to avoid being shot. The chase climaxes at the Marina City complex, where they steal vehicles and Thorson chases Bernardo to the upper levels of a parking garage. Thorson corners him at a dead end. Bernardo stomps the gas pedal, misses a turn and accidentally plunges off the parking deck to his death in the Chicago River.

Returning to Los Angeles, Thorson learns from a badly beaten Price that Dotty has been kidnapped by Rocco Mason, who is holding her at the high school where she teaches. Thorson rushes there but Mason disarms him, kills a security guard with an assault rifle, and attempts to kill Thorson. Thorson lures Mason into a chemistry classroom that he has flooded with flammable gas. Mason opens fire, igniting the gas and blowing up the room and himself.

Dotty goes into labor and Thorson rushes her to the hospital. He alerts an emergency nurse and collapses in the lobby. When he comes to and walks back outside, Dotty has already given birth. He holds their new baby, who looks like Thorson.

== Cast ==
- Steve McQueen as Ralph "Papa" Thorson
- Eli Wallach as Ritchie Blumenthal
- Kathryn Harrold as Dotty
- LeVar Burton as Tommy Price
- Ben Johnson as Sheriff Strong
- Richard Venture as Police Captain Spota
- Tracey Walter as Rocco Mason
- Thomas Rosales Jr. as Anthony Bernardo
- Theodore Wilson as Winston Blue
- Ray Bickel as Luke Branch
- Bobby Bass as Matthew Branch
- Karl Schueneman as Billie Joe
- Christopher Keane as Mike
- Nathaniel Taylor as Trotter
- Alex Ross as Chief McCurdy
- Taurean Blacque as Hustler
- Tony Burton as Garbageman
- Michael D. Roberts, Kevin Hagen, and Luis Ávalos as Poker Players
- Wynn Irwin as Informer
- Poppy Lagos as Mrs. Bernardo

Uncredited

- Al Ruscio as Mr. Bernardo
- David Spielberg as Sergeant Werblo
- Jophery Brown as Train Passenger

The real Ralph Thorson makes a cameo appearance as a bartender.

== Production ==
=== Development ===
The film was developed by Rastar and set up at Paramount. Producer Mort Engelberg obtained the film rights Ralph "Papa" Thorson's life story in the mid-1970s after reading press coverage of his exploits, and always intended Steve McQueen to star. Initially, Michael Winner was attached to direct, from a screenplay from John Rester Zodrow, but neither was involved in the final film.

Richard Levinson and William Link (under the shared pseudonym 'Ted Leighton') wrote the initial script based on Christopher Keane's biography of the real Ralph "Papa" Thorson. Peter Hyams was hired to re-write and direct, but was fired after doing a draft. McQueen wanted to replace him as director, but the Directors Guild of America would not allow it because McQueen had been on the project before Hyams.

McQueen made the film after making Tom Horn. Around this time, he was also signed for Tai-Pan at the highest fee any actor had received.

=== Shooting ===
Filming began September 1979. McQueen reportedly did a lot of directing on set.

The opening street scene was shot in Joliet, Illinois. The capture of Tommy Price in Herscher, and payphone scenes with Papa Thorson talking to Sheriff Strong, were filmed in Bonfield. The classic riverhouse explosion early in the picture was filmed on the Kankakee River near Aroma Park. The structure was built for the film, then destroyed. The cabin was taken apart (not destroyed), reassembled and sold for a hunting retreat on an island in the Kankakee river basin.

The airport scene in which Papa picks up the Trans Am was filmed at the Greater Kankakee Airport. Historic downtown Lemont was used for the scene in which Steve McQueen performs a burnout in front of the police officer. Also, the current public works building across from the post office was used as the police station and jail. The cornfield chase scenes between the Firebird Trans Am and the combine were filmed in Manteno.

A portion of the film was shot in Old Town, Chicago, on the El. Scenes involving Papa chasing his quarry "Bernardo" in a parking garage were shot at Marina City. The stunt with the fleeing suspect driving off the Marina City garage and plunging into the Chicago River was recreated in 2006 for a TV advertisement for Allstate Insurance.

=== Steve McQueen's illness ===
McQueen was diagnosed with a rare and aggressive form of terminal lung cancer, malignant mesothelioma, on December 22, 1979, the month after filming had ended. He first began to suspect his condition in the autumn of that year, while he was shooting scenes for this film on location in Chicago. The chronic cough he developed a year earlier and shortness of breath became more pronounced, causing some delays in the filming of his performances.

Due to his respiratory problems, his action scenes were entirely performed by several skilled stuntmen. Two notable stuntmen involved were Loren Janes (uncredited) and Thomas Rosales Jr., who played the character Anthony Bernardo.

McQueen would die just three months after the film's release and less than a year after his lung cancer diagnosis, on November 7, 1980.

== Release ==
The film opened August 1, 1980, in 425 theaters in the United States and Canada.

=== Box office ===
The film grossed $7.2 million in its first 12 days of release in the United States and Canada. It went on to gross $16.3 million there.

== Reception ==
=== Critical reception ===
Critical reception to the film was generally negative, marking Steve McQueen's second consecutive critical failure following Tom Horn, released just five months earlier that year.

The Hunter holds a 54% approval rating based on 13 reviews, with an average rating of 5.4/10 on Rotten Tomatoes. In Leonard Maltin's publication, TV Movies, the film is given a BOMB rating, and the entry states, "McQueen's last picture and probably his worst".

Roger Ebert of the Chicago Sun Times wrote: "Because McQueen can be so effective in action pictures, The Hunter is all the more frustrating: Didn’t anybody point out that the script was a mess that made no sense? Didn’t anybody have the guts to? Maybe they thought superstar McQueen would save the day. Pictures like this could finish him off. And I haven’t even mentioned Michel Legrand’s incredibly inappropriate music, which inspires the movie’s best laughs."
