= Torchlight (1985 film) =

- Directed by: Thomas J. Wright
- Written by: Pamela Sue Martin; Eliza Moorman
- Produced by: Joe Douglas; Pamela Sue Martin; Edward L. Montoro; Manuel Rojas; Michael Schroeder
- Starring: Pamela Sue Martin; Steve Railsback; Ian McShane
- Music by: Michael Cannon
- Release date: 1985
- Country: United States
- Language: English

Torchlight is an American 1985 film directed by Thomas J. Wright and starring Pamela Sue Martin.

== Premise ==
A young married couple's relationship comes under fire when the husband becomes addicted to cocaine.
