= Lotsa Luck =

American sitcom (1973–1974)

- Genre: Sitcom
- Created by: Carl Reiner; Bill Persky; Sam Denoff
- Written by: Norman Barasch; Saul Turteltaub; Arnold Kane; Gordon Farr; Ron Friedman; Roy Kammerman; Steve Gordon
- Directed by: Bill Foster
- Starring: Dom DeLuise; Kathleen Freeman; Wynn Irwin; Beverly Sanders; Jack Knight
- Composers: Jack Elliott; Allyn Ferguson
- Country of origin: United States
- Original language: English
- No. of seasons: 1
- No. of episodes: 22

Production
- Producers: Carroll Moore; Don Van Atta
- Editors: Dave Gayden; Armond Poitras; Dick King
- Camera setup: Multi-camera
- Running time: 25 minutes
- Production company: Concept II Productions

Original release
- Network: NBC
- Release: September 10, 1973 – March 15, 1974

Related
- On the Buses

Lotsa Luck is an American sitcom, broadcast on NBC during the 1973–74 television season. The series stars Dom DeLuise as bachelor Stanley Belmont who lives with his bossy mother (Kathleen Freeman), his sister Olive (Beverly Sanders) and her unemployed husband, Arthur (Wynn Irwin). Jack Knight also stars as Stanley's best friend, Bummy.

Lotsa Luck is based on the British ITV London Weekend Television series On the Buses.

== Overview ==
The show centers around Stanley's frustration with his lazy, mooching brother-in-law, Arthur, who refuses to get a job, dresses like a slob (usually unshaven and wearing a bathrobe), is constantly smoking and eats like a horse. Stanley works at the lost-and-found department of the city bus company, supporting his entire family.

The show was ranked 52nd out of 80 shows that season with a 16.9 rating, tying with Music Country USA.

== Episode list ==
| No. | Title | Directed by | Written by | Original release date |
|---|---|---|---|---|
| 0 | "The Family Flu" | Bill Persky | Sam Denoff, Bill Persky | Unaired |
Ma and Olive (Beverly Sanders) come down with the flu, ruining Stan and Bummy's double date plans. Then, Olive shares her flu bug with the family.
| 1 | "Olive's Present" | Bill Persky | Sam Denoff, Bill Persky | September 10, 1973 |
Olive's foot gets stuck in the toilet tank after trying to stand on the broken tank lid. In trying to extricate it, however, Stanley (Dom DeLuise) ends up breaking the whole tank. When Stanley tries to avoid paying the stiff price for a new toilet and plans to use the money earmarked for Olive's birthday present in the process, she insists that he choose an orange toilet with a purple lid.
| 2 | "The Bare Facts" | Alan Rafkin | Saul Turteltaub | September 17, 1973 |
Olive is concerned that Arthur (Wynn Irwin) has visited the free clinic three times in one week, and that this may be a sign that he's seriously ill. Stanley isn't as concerned about Arthur's well-being, but under pressure from his mother Iris (Kathleen Freeman), Stanley calls the clinic, and is informed that Arthur hasn't visited the clinic in weeks. Olive, Stanley, and their mother fear that this can mean only one thing: Arthur has found another woman.
| 3 | "Trial Separation" | Alan Rafkin | Norman Barasch, Carroll Moore | September 24, 1973 |
On their seventh wedding anniversary, Olive and Arthur have a terrible fight when Arthur tries to save money by "recycling" the anniversary card he gave Olive the year before. This leads them to initiate a "trial separation", except that because Arthur is unemployed, the "separation" consists of his sleeping first on the living room couch, and then trying to bunk with Stanley.
| 4 | "Stanley and the Librarian" | Alan Rafkin | Norman Barasch, Carroll Moore | October 1, 1973 |
Stanley's mother invites a librarian over for dinner, thinking she'll be a "nice girl" for Stanley to meet. Initially irritated at his mother's matchmaking, Stanley soon changes his mind when he sees how attractive the woman is. As Stanley starts to woo her on his own, however, she warns him that she's not really the kind of girl he thinks. (Jackie Joseph) guest-stars.
| 5 | "The Suit" | Alan Rafkin | Norman Barasch, Carroll Moore | October 8, 1973 |
Frustrated at the rising cost of living and Arthur's continuing umployement, Stanley gives Arthur an ultimatum: get a job, or he'll get no more food paid for by Stanley. Arthur agrees, but another complication arises: Arthur doesn't have a presentable suit for an interview. Stanley's pal Bummy (Jack Knight) comes up with a solution: Arthur can "borrow" an expensive suit from the bus company's Lost and Found Department long enough for one interview that looks like a good prospect.
| 6 | "Mom's Secret" | Alan Rafkin | Norman Barasch, Carroll Moore | October 15, 1973 |
Stanley and Olive notice that their mother has gone out three nights in a row supposedly to do the laundry at a laundromat. They become even more suspicious when she almost forgets the laundry bag before she leaves. But then Bummy comes by and partially solves the mystery: he saw her the night before going into a bar accompanied by a gentleman. (Harold Gould) guest-stars.
| 7 | "The Winning Purse" | Alan Rafkin | Saul Turteltaub | October 19, 1973 |
Tired of hearing Stanley complain about bills, Arthur offers Stanley an easy way to make money, by following Arthur's horse racing tips. Stanley refuses, but his mother insists upon placing a $2.00 bet on one of Arthur's hot tips. Stanley believes that this is both foolish and immoral, but reconsiders when two of Arthur's recommendations pay off.
| 8 | "The Family Plot" | Bill Persky | Sam Denoff, Bill Persky | October 29, 1973 |
The City of New York sends the Belmonts a letter that in order to expand its airport, it intends to condemn the cemetery plot where Stanley's and Olive's late father (and their mother's late husband) is buried. At first they learn that the City is offering $2,000 for the land. Then Stanley comes to believe that he can finally get his long-desired color television set if they can find a replacement plot for substantially less than the $2,000. (Henry Corden) guest-stars.
| 9 | "The Shrink" | Bill Persky | Roy Kammerman | November 5, 1973 |
Stanley has been suffering from insomnia, and his fatigue affects his job performance. When Bummy advises him that this could lead to a demotion back to driving a bus, Stanley reluctantly decides to visit Dr. Schrager, the company psychiatrist. Dr. Schrager pinpoints the likely cause of his insomnia as Stanley's resentment over Arthur. But the cure he suggests, that Stanley start being nice to Arthur, could be worse than the disease.
| 10 | "The New Stan" | Alan Rafkin | Norman Barasch, Carroll Moore | November 12, 1973 |
Stanley becomes frustrated at his lack of success at getting dates with the women in his little black book, so Bummy suggests a change in his image. First, he helps Stan get a "mod" velvet suit at a contemporary clothing store. Women still seem a bit reluctant to respond to Stanley, so he decides to do something about his biggest problem, his hair.
| 11 | "Arthur's Inheritance" | Alan Rafkin | Bill Manhoff | November 26, 1973 |
A telegram arrives one evening for Arthur, and after some hesitation he opens it to learn that his rich, 93 year-old Uncle Elroy from Montana has died and left him something. Stanley insists that Arthur call the lawyer to learn what he is to inherit. Arthur initially tries to hide that he's supposed to receive $20,000 from his uncle's estate. This gives Stanley visions of being able to recapture some of Arthur's expenses that he's paid over the years, but it turns out that the inheritance comes with a catch. (Alvy Moore) guest-stars.
| 12 | "The Belmont Connection" | Alan Rafkin | John Boni | December 3, 1973 |
Stanley is visited by a police lieutenant who advises him that the Lost and Found Department might be used as a "drop" in a drug deal, though only after a couple of dry runs. Stanley recalls a suspicious incident that very day in which one man brought in a package, and then another man claimed it almost immediately. The lieutenant gives Stanley his telephone number and enlists Stanley and his "inside man" to help catch the drug dealers, although as the possible danger becomes apparent, Stanley begins to have second thoughts about his public-spiritedness.
| 13 | "Will You Marry Me?" | Alan Rafkin | Steve Gordon | December 10, 1973 |
Stanley has been dating a new woman named Marsha and invites her to dinner to meet his family. As the evening progresses, Stanley decides that it's finally time to "pop the question". He learns, however, that as a modern woman, Marsha has other ideas about how a couple should determine their compatibility, before marriage. (Pat Finley) guest-stars.
| 14 | "Do Me a Favor" | Alan Rafkin | Saul Turteltaub | January 11, 1974 |
One of Stanley's old friends from the neighborhood, Nuzio Farentino, is now Rick Ferris, a successful singer who lives in Hollywood. When the Belmonts learn that Nunzio/Rick is putting on a show in New York, they get an idea to call him for free tickets. Stanley decided to take advantage of the tickets to get a date with an attractive woman in the parts department at the bus company, but things don't work out quite as Stanley intends. (Alex Rocco) guest-stars.
| 15 | "Stan and the Wealthy Widow" | Alan Rafkin | Norman Barasch, Carroll Moore | January 18, 1974 |
The Belmonts entertain Stanley's former acquaintance from high school, Wilma Wallachek, who at that time was known as "Two-Ton Wallachek". Wilma is now out of the Marine Corps, slimmed down considerably, and the widow of an elderly man who ran a cat food company. Wilma, still grateful to Stanley because he was the only boy who was kind to her in high school, offers him a job with her company, at a substantial increase in pay over the bus company. Stanley, though put off by some of Wilma's annoying personal quirks, eagerly accepts, but soon learns that Wilma has an ulterior motive for her generosity. (Ruth Buzzi) guest-stars.
| 16 | "The Talent Show" | Alan Rafkin | Arnie Kogen | January 25, 1974 |
The annual bus company talent show has come around again, with the first prize a week's vacation in Miami. Stanley and Bummy Pfitzer initially discuss reviving their routine as a music and comedy duo. But when they have a failing out, Stanley decides to present a magic act (which owes more than a little to Dom DeLuise's alter ego as inept magician "Dominick the Great"). To complete the act, he recruits the voluptuous Reenee Muldoon as his stage assistant, whom he also would like to accompany him on the trip to Miami if he wins. (Johnny Brown), (Louisa Moritz) and (Danny Wells) guest-star.
| 17 | "A Little Order of Law and Order" | Alan Rafkin | Ron Friedman | February 1, 1974 |
The Belmonts household is the victim of a burglary. Not getting much help from the police, Stanley decides to install a burglar alarm, but he finds that it is not particularly effective. So Stanley decides to move on to an alternate plan, getting a killer watchdog.
| 18 | "You Oughta Be in Pictures" | Alan Rafkin | Gordon Farr, Arnold Kane | February 8, 1974 |
Stan decides to compete for the part of "Driver Dan", the bus company's spokesman in a series of local television commercials. His "everyman" looks, such as being chubby and balding, seem to get him the part. But when he's invited to audition on a television set, Stan discovers that there's more to appearing in a television commercial than just smiling and saying a few words for the camera. (Ronnie Schell) guest-stars.
| 19 | "Stan's Assistant" | Alan Rafkin | Roy Kammerman | February 15, 1974 |
Because of the energy crisis, more people are riding the bus, and more items are piling up in the Lost and Found department, creating a different crisis for Stanley. Stanley's boss decides to hire an assistant for Stanley, and Stanley suggests a "guy he knows", his ne'er-do-well brother-in-law Arthur. Stanley soon discovers that not only does this mean working eight hours a day with his detested relative, but that his boss shows signs of preferring Arthur as an employee over Stanley. (Stuart Nisbet) guest-stars.
| 20 | "Arthur Makes His Move" | Bill Foster | Steve Gordon | February 22, 1974 |
Arthur discovers that his old Navy buddy Monroe is being treated at the same clinic that Arthur uses. Arthur invites Monroe over to dinner, and Stanley finds Monroe to be the same kind of freeloader as Arthur. But Monroe helps bring change to the Belmont household when Arthur reacts to an insult from Stanley by moving into Monroe's apartment. (Alan Oppenheimer) guest-stars.
| 21 | "Bummy's Girl" | Alan Rafkin | Steve Gordon | March 8, 1974 |
Bummy has fallen hard for his new girlfriend, Gloria, so much so that he's even thrown away his little black book. While he's off visiting his parents in Boston, Bummy asks Stanley to take Gloria out. Unexpectedly, she begins to prefer his company to the handsome Bummy. (Suzanne Somers) guest-stars.
| 22 | "Get Off My Back" | Alan Rafkin | Saul Turteltaub | March 15, 1974 |
While trying to fix a hole in his kitchen ceiling, Stanley is injured in a fall from a ladder. He finds that the cost of medical treatment and physical therapy will place a serious financial burden on him, enough of a burden, in fact, that he begins to consider Bummy's suggestion that he recreate the injury on the job so that his treatment will be covered by worker's compensation. (Robert Hoy) guest-stars.

== Home media ==
On November 29, 2005, S'More Entertainment released all 22 episodes on DVD in Region 1 in a 4-disc set entitled Lotsa Luck – The Complete Series.

== Reception ==
Lotsa Luck failed to attract an audience, and the series was cancelled after one full season.
