= Beverly Sanders =

American actress, comedian and voice artist

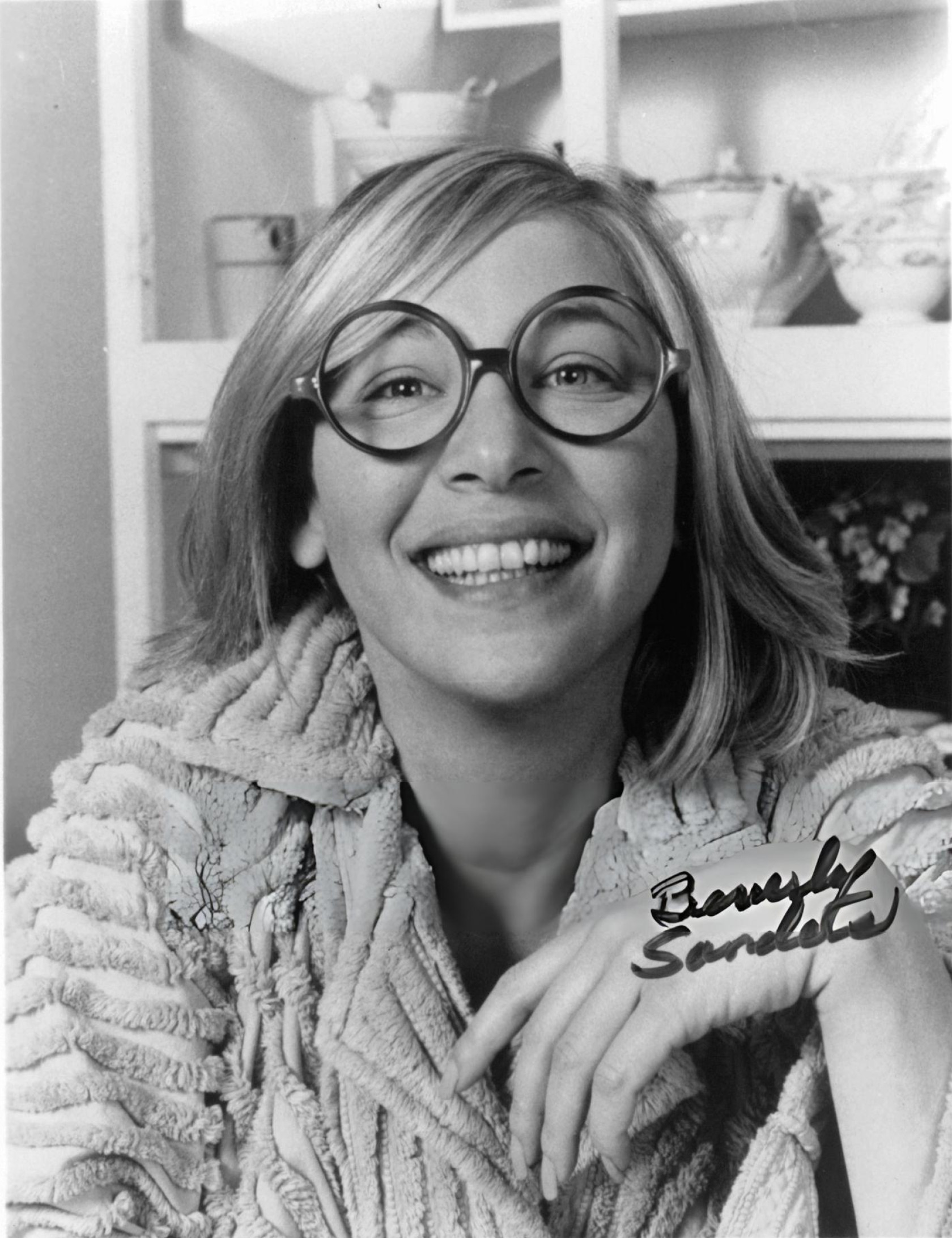
- Sanders in Lotsa Luck (1973)
- Occupations: Comedian, actress, voice artist
- Years active: 1962–present

Beverly Sanders is an American actress, comedian, and voice artist.

== Biography ==
Sanders is married to Harvey Newmark, first bass violist of the Los Angeles Philharmonic Orchestra.

On television, Sanders has appeared in guest roles on several series' including Emergency!, Sanford and Son, Kojak, The Mary Tyler Moore Show, Rhoda, Mary Hartman, Mary Hartman, The Love Boat, Quincy, M.E., Barney Miller and Night Court. Sanders was a regular on the NBC sitcom Lotsa Luck (which starred Dom DeLuise) for one season during 1973–74; she also had a recurring role on the NBC sitcom CPO Sharkey (which starred Don Rickles) as Chief Petty Officer Gypsy Koch (she appeared in 3 episodes). Her feature film credits include Magic (1978) and And Justice for All (1979).

Sanders starred in a one-woman show on stage entitled Yes Sir, That's My Baby in the 1990s. She began writing the play after taking a UCLA writing class. The show details her failure to conceive a baby being more than 40 years old and frustrations of the adoption process.

Sanders has appeared in more than 300 TV commercials. She played the Arm & Hammer Baking Soda spokesperson Louise for nearly a decade.

== Filmography ==
=== Television ===
Year	Title	Role	Notes
1971–1972	The Mary Tyler Moore Show	Rayette, the waitress	3 episodes
1972	Love, American Style	Carol Baxter	"Love and the Unbearable Fiance"
1972	Ironside	Saleslady	Episode: "Who'll Cry for My Baby"
1973	Emergency!	Leslie Noble	Episode: "Honest"
1973–1974	Lotsa Luck	Olive Swann	Series regular, 22 episodes
1974	Sanford and Son	Nora Simpson	Episode: "Matchmaker, Matchmaker"
1974–1977	Rhoda	Susan Alborn	Recurring character, 6 episodes
1974	Paul Sand in Friends and Lovers	Bambi	Episode: "A Date with Robert"
1975	Kojak	Stella	Episode: "Queen of the Gypsies"
1975	The ABC Afternoon Playbreak	Susan Miller	Episode: "The Girl Who Couldn't Lose"
1975	Kate McShane		Episode: "Accounts Receivable"
1975	Queen of the Stardust Ballroom	Diane	TV movie
1976	The Love Boat	Rita Merrit	TV movie pilot for series
1976	Hickey	Netty	Unsold TV pilot, written & directed by Alan Alda
1976	Look What's Happened to Rosemary's Baby	Hollywood columnist	TV movie
1977	The McLean Stevenson Show	Fanny	Episode: "Money Troubles"
1977	Family	Mrs. Gilroy	Episode: "We Love You, Miss Jessup"
1977–1978	C.P.O. Sharkey	Chief Gypsy Koch	3 episodes
1978	Sparrow	Tammy	TV movie
1978	Fantasy Island	Stephanie Marie	Episode: "Bet a Million/Mr. Irresistible"
1978	Barney Miller	Lorraine Siegel	Episode: "The Kidnapping" (hour-long episode)
1979	Quincy, M.E.	Nurse	Episode: "For the Benefit of My Patients"
1980	Hart to Hart	Mrs. Ann Mager	Episode: "A Question of Innocence"
1980–1981	One Day at a Time	Selma	Episodes: "Triple Play"; "Out of Bounds"
1980	Trapper John, M.D.	Meter Maid	Episode: "Hot Line"
1981	It's a Living	Barbara	Episode: "Up on the Roof"
1981	CHiPs	Muriel Higgins	Episode: "Home Fires Burning"
1981	Mork & Mindy	Caroline McConnell	Episode: "Mork and the Family Reunion"
1982	The Fall Guy		Episode: "The Adventures of Ozzie and Harold"
1982	Too Close for Comfort	Nurse Gaynor	Episode: "Seventh Month Blues"
1983	The Other Woman	Linda Gleason	TV movie
1984	Lottery!		Episode: "Miami: Sharing"
1984	St. Elsewhere	Mitzi Clarenden	2 episodes
1985	Cover Up	Dee Dee Peire	Episode: "Who's Trying to Kill Miss Globe?"
1985–1986	Too Close for Comfort	Marsha	3 episodes
1985	The Jetsons	(voice)	Episode: "Elroy in Wonderland"
1985	Amazing Stories	Susan	Episode: "Guilt Trip"
1986	Mary		Episode: "The Death Threat"
1987	Tales from the Hollywood Hills: Pat Hobby Teamed with Genius	Mrs. Robinson	TV movie
1987	CBS Summer Playhouse	Mrs. Schluter	Episode: "Sons of Gunz"
1987	Full House	Mindy Gladstone	Episode: "The Return of Grandma"
1988	Night Court	Mrs. Cooper	Episode: "Hit the Road, Jack"
1988	Annie McGuire	Hillary	Episode: "The Ferry"
1988	Duet	Mrs. McGee	Episode: "One Man Out"
1989	Moonlighting	Adelaide Sapperman	Episode: "When Girls Collide"
1990	A Family for Joe	Doctor Bennett	TV movie
1990	Thanksgiving Day	Rusty Carey	TV movie
1992	Capitol Critters	(voice)	Episode: "Of Thee I Sting"
1992	Delta	Mrs. Shirley Ratigan	Episode: "The Cabin and the Credit Card"
1994	The George Carlin Show	Tammi	Episode: "George Gets Caught in the Middle"
1995	Kirk	Cashier	Episode: "Night at the Movies"
1996	The Faculty	Mrs. Wilson	Episode: "Opportunity Knockers"
1996	Baywatch	Ethel Beeber	Episode: "Buried"
1997	Payback	Barbara	TV movie
1997	Sabrina, the Teenage Witch	Chair (voice)	Episode: "A River of Candy Corn Runs Through It"
2002	Leap of Faith	Employee	Episode: "Pilot"
2002	Providence		Episode: "Things Have Changed"
2004	Grounded for Life	Nun	Episode: "Mystery Dance"
2004	Charmed	Mrs. Mullen	Episode: "Charmed Noir"
2005	Veronica Mars	Elaine Van Lowe	Episode: "Kanes and Abel's"
2007	All I Want for Christmas	Mrs. C	TV movie
2008–2009	Entourage	Eric's Receptionist	3 episodes
2010	Scooby-Doo! Curse of the Lake Monster	Wanda Grubwort	TV movie

=== Films ===
Year	Title	Role	Notes
1979	...And Justice for All	Sherry	
1978	Magic	Laughing Lady	
1986	Just Between Friends	Judy	
1986	The Malibu Bikini Shop	Berta Hilgard	
1996	Shooting Lily	Mary (Lily's Mom)	
2000	The Flintstones in Viva Rock Vegas	Photographer	
2005	Behind the Curtain	Jessica Zielinski	Short film
2012	The Debt Collector	Evelyn Pearl	Short film
