= Thomas Rosales Jr. =

American actor

- Born: February 3, 1948 (age 77); El Paso, Texas, U.S.
- Occupations: Actor; stuntman

Thomas Rosales Jr. (born February 3, 1948) is an American actor and stuntman who has appeared in more than 100 films.

== Career ==
His first known appearance as a stuntman was in Battle for the Planet of the Apes in 1973.

Rosales' filmography includes; Dawn of the Planet of the Apes, RoboCop 2, Scarface, Need for Speed, Tremors 2: Aftershocks, Universal Soldier, Predator 2, L.A. Confidential, U.S. Marshals, Deep Impact, The Running Man, The Hunter, The Lost World: Jurassic Park, Speed, NCIS, The A-Team, Walker, Texas Ranger, Blood In Blood Out and Analyze That.

== Partial filmography ==
- 1978 Every Which Way but Loose as Truck Driver
- 1980 The Hunter as Anthony Bernardo
- 1986 Raw Deal as Jesus
- 1987 The Running Man as Chico
- 1990 RoboCop 2 as Chet
- 1990 Predator 2 as El Scorpio Gang Member
- 1990 Alligator II: The Mutation as Victor
- 1991 One Good Cop as Beniamino Associate #3
- 1991 Ricochet as Gonzalo, Drug Dealer
- 1991 Rush as Wino
- 1992 Universal Soldier as Wagner, Terrorist Leader
- 1993 Man's Best Friend as Mugger
- 1994 CyberTracker as Man with Gun in Club
- 1994 Speed as Vinnie
- 1996 Tremors 2: Aftershocks as Oil Worker
- 1997 The Lost World: Jurassic Park as Carter
- 1997 L.A. Confidential as Mexican Prisoner
- 1997 Con Air as a Cindino Gunman (credited as Tommy Rosales)
- 1997 Face/Off as a Prisoner
- 1999 Judgment Day as Payne's Man (uncredited)
- 2000 Held for Ransom as Swamp Man #2
- 2012 Act of Valor as Christo's RHM
- 2012 Bad Ass as Bartender
- 2014 Need for Speed as Valet
- 2014 Dawn of the Planet of the Apes as Old Man
- 2015 Our Brand Is Crisis as Mini-Vehicle Driver (uncredited)
- 2017 The Beautiful Ones as Tuco
