= The Gun and the Pulpit =

1974 TV film

- DVD cover
- Genre: Western
- Based on: The Fastest Gun in the Pulpit by Jack Ehrlich
- Teleplay by: William Bowers
- Directed by: Daniel Petrie
- Starring: Marjoe Gortner
- Music by: George Tipton
- Country of origin: United States
- Original language: English

Production
- Executive producer: Paul Junger Witt
- Producer: Paul Maslansky
- Production locations: Old Tucson - 201 S. Kinney Road, Tucson, Arizona; Sonoran Desert; Tucson, Arizona; Tucson Mountains; Sierrita Mountains
- Cinematography: Richard C. Glouner
- Editor: Terence Anderson
- Running time: 74 minutes
- Production company: Danny Thomas Productions in association with Cine Television

Original release
- Network: ABC
- Release: April 3, 1974

The Gun and the Pulpit is a 1974 American Western television film starring Marjoe Gortner and Slim Pickens, directed by Daniel Petrie. It was based on Jack Ehrlich's 1972 novel The Fastest Gun in the Pulpit. Filmed at Old Tucson, it was a television pilot for a series to star Gortner, a former evangelist.

== Plot summary ==
Gunfighter Ernie Parsons escapes hanging for the killing of a disreputable character by the false testimony of a woman attracted to him. During his escape, he finds the body of a murdered minister. Searching the corpse, Ernie discovers a letter from a town which has invited the deceased man, sight unseen, to be their town minister. Ernie takes the victim's clothes and belongings to escape his pursuers. He has decided to impersonate the dead man.

Welcomed to town, Ernie's first action is to preside over a funeral of Sam Underwood, a man murdered on the orders of town boss Mr. Ross. Attracted to Underwood's daughter, Ernie decides to stay, using his gunfighter skills to stand up to Ross.

Ernie is disgusted by the cowardice of the townspeople, dismissing Ross's men as mere cowboys wearing pistols rather than professional gunfighters. He shoots dead or scares off the first few men Ross send to get rid of him. With his men cowed by the preacher's shooting skills, Ross hires a professional gunfighter to kill him. The two men already know each other, and hold a duel in the center of town. When both miss each other from close range the gunfighter takes it as a sign and leaves.

Parsons is ambushed by Ross's men and dragged through the desert and left for dead. He is found in the desert and brought back to the Underwood's home and nursed back to health. Parsons arranges for a fake burial and takes to the hills, attacking Ross's men through surprise attacks, and scaring some of them off. Eventually, Parsons is persuaded to head back to town.

Parsons holds a service at church and is interrupted by Ross, claiming to want a truce. Most of the town folk believe him. The next day, Ross and his men come to town to ambush Parsons. Parsons asks for the help of men from the church, but they are too scared to help. When Parsons takes on Ross and his men alone, some of the town men, having reconsidered, come to his aid. Ross is killed by Parsons, ending the battle. Free to marry Underwood's daughter, Parsons instead rides away, feeling his work is done and his continued impersonation of a preacher will only lead to more trouble.

As Parsons rides away he meets a preacher heading to town to investigate the events, but who already knows everything important that went on. The preacher tells Parsons he was justified in protecting the town in his own way, but he doesn't convince Parsons to return. The preacher says, "I'll be seeing you, Ernie" and resumes on his way to town. Ernie rides on for a few more seconds, then stops and half turns his horse on the trail. He is now halfway facing the town, and has a smile on his face.

== Cast ==
- Marjoe Gortner as Ernie Parsons
- Slim Pickens as Billy One-Eye
- David Huddleston as Mr. Ross
- Geoffrey Lewis as Jason McCoy
- Estelle Parsons as Sadie Underwood
- Pamela Sue Martin as Sally Underwood
- Jeff Corey as Head of Posse
- Karl Swenson as Adams
- Jon Lormer as Luther
- Robert Phillips as Tom Underwood
- Larry Ward as Max
- Joan Goodfellow as Dixie

== See also ==
- List of American films of 1974
