= Sunburn (1979 film) =

1979 film by Richard C. Sarafian

- Theatrical release poster
- Directed by: Richard C. Sarafian
- Screenplay by: James Booth; John Daly; Stephen Oliver
- Based on: The Bind by Stanley Ellin
- Produced by: John Daly; Gerald Green
- Starring: Farrah Fawcett-Majors; Charles Grodin; Art Carney; Joan Collins; William Daniels; John Hillerman; Eleanor Parker; Alejandro Rey; Keenan Wynn; Robin Clarke; Joan Goodfellow; Jack Kruschen
- Cinematography: Alex Phillips Jr.
- Edited by: Geoffrey Foot
- Music by: John Cameron
- Production companies: Fawcett-Majors Productions; Tuesday Films; Hemdale Film Corporation; Bind Films
- Distributed by: Paramount Pictures
- Release date: August 10, 1979
- Running time: 99 minutes
- Countries: United States; United Kingdom
- Language: English
- Box office: $2.4 million

Sunburn is a 1979 British-American comedy detective film directed by Richard C. Sarafian and written by James Booth, John Daly and Stephen Oliver. It is based on the novel The Bind by Stanley Ellin. The film stars Farrah Fawcett, Charles Grodin, Art Carney, Joan Collins, William Daniels and John Hillerman. The film was released on August 10, 1979, by Paramount Pictures.

== Plot ==
Jake Dekker is a private eye who is hired by an insurance company to travel to Acapulco and investigate the death of a rich industrialist named Theron. In an effort to cloak his intentions, Dekker adopts the persona of an independently wealthy jet-setter and hires the beautiful Ellie Morgan to pose as his wife. After the two arrive, they are invited to a party, where they become acquainted with Theron's offspring—a grown daughter and son, named Joanna and Karl. Of the two, only Joanna appears to be genuinely in grief, while Karl takes his father's death in stride, all the while attempting to seduce Ellie, unsuccessfully.

After Dekker's real purpose for being in Acapulco is discovered, the dead man's reclusive widow, Mrs. Theron, declines offering Dekker any assistance in his search for the truth behind her husband's demise. However, Dekker's old friend and colleague, Marcus, researches Theron's past and discovers the unfortunate man was actually an escaped Nazi who found refuge in Mexico some thirty years earlier. This information, concealed by others for purposes of blackmail, proves the key to the mystery of just who killed Theron and why.

== Cast ==
- Farrah Fawcett-Majors as Ellie Morgan
- Charles Grodin as Jake Dekker
- Art Carney as Marcus
- Joan Collins as Nera
- William Daniels as Crawford
- John Hillerman as Webb
- Eleanor Parker as Mrs. Theron
- Keenan Wynn as Mark Elmes
- Robin Clarke as Karl
- Joan Goodfellow as Joanna
- Jack Kruschen as Gela
- Alejandro Rey as Fons
- Jorge Luke as Vasquez
- Seymour Cassel as Dobbs
- Joanna Rush as Mamie
- Alex Sharp as Kunz
- Bob Orrison as Milan
- Delroy White as Dr. Kellogg
- Christa Walter as Mrs. Kellogg

== Production ==
=== Original novel ===
The film was based on the novel, The Bind by Stanley Ellin, which was published in 1970. The Chicago Tribune called it a "well plotted puzzle". The New York Times said it was "brimful of incident, smoothly effective and has the pace of a frightened whippet."

Film rights were bought prior to publication, in November 1969, by producer Phil Waxman, who wanted Robert Redford in the lead.

The rights transferred to John Daly at Hemdale.

=== Development ===
The film became the second starring vehicle for Farrah Fawcett-Majors after she left Charlie's Angels. As with her first film, she was paid $750,000.

Harrison Ford was originally announced as her leading man. Eventually Charles Grodin was cast off the back of his success in Heaven Can Wait. Grodin admitted "I was sixth choice for the role."

The film was financed by the cinema chain United Artists Theatres, and British company Hemdale. Paramount bought the film for American distribution.

=== Shooting ===
Filming took place in Acapulco in September 1978.

=== Soundtrack ===
The Original Soundtrack Album From... Sunburn

Soundtrack album by Various Artists
- Released: 1979
- Recorded: 1979
- Label: Arrival

Singles from The Original Soundtrack Album From... Sunburn
- 1. "Sunburn" Released: 1979

A soundtrack album, The Original Soundtrack Album From... Sunburn for the film was released in 1979 featuring John Cameron's score and songs from the film including the original title composition "Sunburn", written and recorded by Graham Gouldman of 10cc. "Sunburn" was also released as a single with the non-album B-side "Think About It", also performed by Gouldman.

A repackaged version of the soundtrack mixed with additional songs titled Sunburn: 22 'Blazing' Disco Hits Including the Original Soundtrack was released in 1980.

== Release ==
The film was sold to television for $3.5 million, as was Fawcett's first film. Her third was sold to NBC for $4.2 million. It was thought Hemdale presold the film enough to make a profit of $1 million.

== Reception ==
Janet Maslin of The New York Times called the film "one of those romantic-comedy-adventure mystery stories that fall into no particular genre save that of the breezy mish-mash. The romantic angle seems almost extraneous, since the camera is so evidently in love with Miss Fawcett that Mr. Grodin doesn't need to be; in any case, her overriding sweetness turns every would-be clinch into a sisterly hug." Todd McCarthy of Variety wrote that the film "exists for no other reason than to provide a vehicle for Farrah Fawcett. She's great to look at, natch, but that's the case on tv and in photos as well, so until someone can dream up a way to use her in plausible dramatic or comedic context, her screen career will remain in the starting gate." Gene Siskel of the Chicago Tribune gave the film 2 stars out of 4 and wrote, "The problem with 'Sunburn' is that Farrah Fawcett's striking looks get in the way of a confusing story that has been mangled by three screenwriters trying to lighten up a tough mystery novel. The result is a two-hour 'Charlie's Angels' episode that seems unnecessarily complicated." Charles Champlin of the Los Angeles Times declared, "It is sloppy, banal, witless, characterless, forced, uninteresting, unsuspenseful, indifferently photographed, wretchedly edited and wasteful of if not actively insulting to a number of interesting and talented performers." Lynn Darling wrote in The Washington Post: "'Sunburn' may not be the suspense-and-action-packed comedy it was intended to be, but it is a chance to see Farrah Fawcett-Majors, her hair, and about a million different costumes, or portions thereof. And to some movie-goers, that's enough." David Ansen of Newsweek called the film "a 'Charlie's Angels' in Acapulco" which "has a thriller plot so perfunctory you never bother to ask whodunit, much less why ... It is entirely forgettable except for Grodin, who once again compensates for having the most anonymous face in movies with his sly, expertly timed comic delivery."

The film was a flop at the box office, with a studio employee claiming that its earnings "will hardly keep us in paperclips", returning under $1 million. A planned second film between Hemdale and Fawcett, Strictly Business, was not made, despite an advertisement featuring Farrah and Roger Moore appearing in the 24 May 1979 issue of Screen International (the ad also mentions Art Carney).

Fawcett later sacked her manager, Jay Bernstein, who said her first two movies had been put together with "hustle and bubble gum."
