= Death Scream =

1975 American made-for-television film

- Genre: Crime; Drama
- Written by: Stirling Silliphant
- Directed by: Richard T. Heffron
- Starring: Lucie Arnaz; Edward Asner; Eric Braeden; Art Carney; Diahann Carroll; Kate Jackson; Cloris Leachman; Tina Louise; Nancy Walker; Raul Julia; John P. Ryan; Phillip Clark
- Theme music composer: Gil Melle
- Country of origin: United States
- Original language: English

Production
- Executive producer: Ron Bernstein
- Producers: Deanne Barkley; Howard Rosenman; Donald March
- Cinematography: Gene Polito
- Editor: David Newhouse
- Running time: 96 minutes
- Production company: Robert Stigwood Organization

Original release
- Network: ABC
- Release: September 26, 1975

Death Scream is a 1975 American made-for-television crime drama film loosely based on an actual event concerning the real-life account of Kitty Genovese, "a young woman whose murder was witnessed by fifteen of her neighbors who did nothing to help and refused to cooperate with the police." It originally aired on ABC on September 26, 1975.

The film had the working title of Homicide, and its rerun title was The Woman Who Cried Murder.

== Premise ==
On March 13, 1964, Catherine "Kitty" Genovese was attacked and viciously stabbed several times by a psychopath while nearby residents watched but did nothing to help.

== Cast ==
- Raul Julia as Detective Nick Rodriguez
- John P. Ryan as Detective Dave Lambert
- Phillip Clark as Detective Johnny Bellon
- Lucie Arnaz as Judy
- Ed Asner as Peter Singleton
- Cloris Leachman as Mrs. Singleton
- Art Carney as Mr. Jacobs
- Diahann Carroll as Betty May
- Kate Jackson as Carol
- Tina Louise as Hilda Murray
- Nancy Walker as Mrs. Jacobs
- Eric Braeden as Kosinsky
- Allyn Ann McLerie as Alice Whitmore
- Dimitra Arliss as Mrs. Kosinsky
- William Bryant as Harry Whitmore
- Joan Goodfellow as Mrs. Daniels
- Les Lannom as Mr. Daniels
- Thelma Houston as Lady Wing Ding
- Bert Freed as Detective Ross
- Don Pedro Colley as Detective Hughes
- Tony Dow as Joey
- Sally Kirkland as Mary
- Todd Susman as Jimmy Crescent
- Belinda Balaski as Jenny Storm
- George Loros as Sergeant Lloyd
- Joe E. Tata as Detective Linsky
- Robert Ito as Hospital Intern
- Helen Hunt as Teila Rodriguez
