= Ralph "Papa" Thorson =

American bounty hunter (1926–1991)

- Born: Ralph Edgar Thorson Jr. July 11, 1926; Anaconda, Montana, U.S.
- Died: November 17, 1991 (aged 65)
- Occupation: Bounty hunter

Ralph Edgar "Papa" Thorson Jr. (July 11, 1926 – November 17, 1991) was an American bounty hunter. In 1976, he was the subject of a biography by Christopher Keane. In that biography, Sue Lyon states, "He's the only man I know who can do a bastard's job with taste and come off looking like a nice guy." The 1980 movie The Hunter starring Steve McQueen was based on Christopher Keane's book.

At 310 pounds (140 kg) and six-foot-two (188 cm), Keane states, there is a "different Papa than the modern day bounty hunter. Papa is also a church bishop; Master bridge champion; renowned astrologer; criminology alumnus of the University of California, Berkeley; child nutritionist, aficionado of classical music."

Papa was born on 11 July 1926 in Anaconda, Montana. His mother, the former Margaret Hayford, had married his father, Ralph Edgar Thorson, Sr., in 1923. The Thorson family had immigrated from Norway in 1886, while the Hayford family had immigrated from England in 1635.

Papa served in the U.S. Navy during World War II, first in flight training and then on board the USS Ingersoll. Following the war, he returned home to Anaconda, but moved to San Rafael, California with his mother, after his father died. At 22, he had a short duration marriage to a "rich girl" named Samantha while simultaneously attending Berkeley, working as a Juvenile Counselor and building a house.

In June 1948, Papa was a pre-med major at Berkeley, while working the summer vacations bartending at Hoberg's Resort Hotel in Lake County, California. There Papa met a San Francisco bail bondsman named A. Boyd "Pooch" Puccinelli, whom he started working for in early September. Papa changed majors to criminology, learned how to scuba dive and play bridge, then moved to Los Angeles in 1958. There he started working for bail bondsman Richie Blumenthal. In 1968 Papa bought a two bedroom North Hollywood home across from James Doohan.

In 1965, Papa's girlfriend, Dotty Barras, and her son Kenny, moved in. It was Kenny who gave him the name Papa. From 1969 to 1976, over a hundred people lived in Papa's house at various times. "They consisted mostly of men Papa had picked up and sent to jail. Not only did he house them and find them jobs where he could, he counseled them, loaned them money, sometimes bailed them out, and only rarely kicked them out when they took extreme advantage." During that time, Papa also served the Temple of Inspired Living as a bishop, which enabled him to perform marriages, and negotiate civil and religious matters on behalf of the Temple. By 1976, Papa had logged 5,000 cases, including Squeaky Fromme plus another Manson Family member picked up at Spahn Ranch.

Papa's fee was 20 percent of the bail. However, when on a weekly retainer to Blumenthal, his fee dropped to 10 percent. A financial disagreement in June 1969 put a three-year hiatus to their bondsman/bounty hunter business arrangement.

Papa's habits included taping most of his phone conversations, "and instead of writing letters he tapes his voice and mails off the cassettes." His view on astrology was that it discovered "what we are and not how we'd like to see ourselves." His attributed his luck in a dangerous profession to "picking the right astrological moment to hunt the man down." Papa states, "I relied on...a condition...which happens when I confront a situation I'm not exactly sure of, a dream-like state where everything moves in slow motion. Fear is not permitted because the territory around me is my own. I control it. I expect to succeed. I'm sure of it. Not cocky, but convinced. It's almost as if some secret force jacks up my perceptions. It's a twilight zone. I enter it just moments before the confrontation. It might be the reason I'm still alive."

Dotty had assisted Papa in bringing in cases from the beginning of their relationship. Their daughter Brandi was born in 1973. Mother and daughter took over the business after Papa died (allegedly due to a car bomb).

== Filmography ==
- 1980 The Hunter as The Bartender

== See also ==
- Taylor v. Taintor
- The Hunter
- The Huntress
