= To Find a Man =

1972 film by Buzz Kulik

- Theatrical release poster
- Directed by: Buzz Kulik
- Screenplay by: Arnold Schulman
- Based on: To Find a Man (novel) by S. J. Wilson
- Produced by: Mort Abrahams; Irving Pincus; Peter L. Skolnik
- Starring: Pamela Sue Martin; Darren O'Connor; Lloyd Bridges
- Cinematography: Andrew Laszlo
- Edited by: Rita Roland
- Music by: David Shire
- Production company: Rastar
- Distributed by: Columbia Pictures
- Release date: January 20, 1972 (New York City)
- Running time: 90 minutes
- Country: United States
- Language: English

To Find a Man is a 1972 American comedy-drama film directed by Buzz Kulik adapted from the S.J. Wilson novel of the same name, and starring Pamela Sue Martin, Darren O'Connor, and Lloyd Bridges. It centers on the platonic friendship between two teenagers as one attempts to help the other get an abortion. The film premiered in New York City on January 20, 1972 and was entered into competition at the 1972 Cannes Film Festival.

Kulik had difficulties in marketing the film due to its controversial subject; newspaper advertisements forbid the use of the word "abortion" in promotions. The film received praise from some critics for its frank, matter-of-fact approach to abortion.

== Plot ==
Rosalind McCarthy is a spoiled 16-year-old who returns home to New York City from boarding school for the holidays. She confides to a friend, Andy, that she might be pregnant.

They seek out the advice of Dr. Katchaturian, a pharmacist. Rosalind naively tries to induce a miscarriage using old wives' tales such as drinking castor oil and even douching with soda pop. Resigned to an abortion before a family vacation in Mexico, she needs money.

Andy tries to get some from the baby's father, Rick, a gigolo with whom Rosalind had a one-night stand. He fails, so he pawns a chemistry set, only to be mugged and robbed on the way home.

In desperation, Andy goes to Rosalind's father, pretending he needs to borrow money for someone he has impregnated. Frank McCarthy obliges, but when he concludes that Rosalind is the one who needs the abortion, he orders Andy never to return to their house. Dr. Hargrave performs the abortion, after which Rosalind thanks him.

== Cast ==
- Pamela Sue Martin as Rosalind McCarthy (credited as Pamela Martin)
- Darren O'Connor as Andy Elliott Morrison
- Lloyd Bridges as Frank McCarthy
- Phyllis Newman as Betty McCarthy
- Tom Ewell as Dr. Hargrave
- Tom Bosley as Dr. Katchaturian
- Miles Chapin as Pete
- Schell Rasten as Rick
- Antonia Rey as Modesta
- Vicki Sue Robinson

== Production ==
Arnold Schulman later said "I got seduced into To Find a Man. [Executive producer] Ray Stark is the most seductive, irresistible louse in the world...There were all kinds of carrots that he dangled in front of me to get me to do that script—including directing—things which are too complicated to go into. I won't even go into the disaster aspects of that film, but we parted with me saying, "Go fuck yourself, you prick! I never want to see you again"."

== Critical reception ==
A.H. Weiler of The New York Times said the film "makes for a hip, sometimes funny and occasionally poignant view of kids under momentary stress." He complimented the "with-it dialogue and natural performances" that make the characters' "efforts…starkly realistic and comic." Though he praised the veteran actors in the supporting roles, he wrote To Find a Man "really belongs to its young newcomers, principally through the extremely sensitive portrayal of Andy by a 16-year-old New Rochelle student, Darren O'Connor, and the persuasive characterization of the selfish and superficial Rosalind by 17-year-old Pamela Martin of Westport". Jay Cocks of Time also praised the cast and said that what distinguishes the film from previous films dealing with similar issues is that "Rosalind is not a weepy, fragile hysteric but a thoroughly selfish adolescent".

In the St. Petersburg Times, J. Oliver Prescott wrote, "Good films about teenagers are infrequently made, and sensitive, tasteful films about subjects of sex are even less common, making 'To Find a Man' a rare experience." He detailed, "Had this film been made in the sexually silent 50s...we would have been subjected to an hour and a half of temptations and 10 minutes of happy ending, leaving one to believe that abortions were evil necessities easily acquired." With this film, Prescott wrote "we are not led to believe that abortion is either a simple topic or that it is simply attained. Instead, we follow the comic, often poignant search for a legally, medically approved answer to a young girl's pregnancy".

The film was met with opposition from conservative audiences due to its lighter approach on the subject of abortion. Buzz Kulik was surprised at the criticisms, saying, "The issue of abortion is no longer valid because there is no issue any more. Legal abortion is a fact of life with thousands of them being done every year." (Note: Abortion was legalized in New York state in 1970, prior to the 1973 Roe v. Wade ruling that made abortion legal in the United States.) He added, "The movie doesn't take a stand for a or against legal abortion. We show that young people don't have the traumantic [sic] aftershocks of abortion that my generation has. It's just a fact of life for them."

Edward L. Blank of The Pittsburgh Press criticized the film's approach on abortion, describing it as too safe and "strictly routine Hollywood cotton candy". He explained, "The movie determinedly avoids comment on abortion as a moral or social issue. Apart from the line--'go to any hospital: it's legal now'--'Man' sticks to a story about boy-going-out-of-his-way-to-help-girl."

== Bibliography ==
- McGilligan, Patrick (1997). "Arnold Schulman: Nothing but Regrets". Backstory 3 : interviews with screenwriters of the 1960s. Berkeley: University of California Press. p. 298-327.
