= Buster and Billie =

1974 film by Daniel Petrie

- Theatrical release poster
- Directed by: Daniel Petrie
- Screenplay by: Ron Turbeville
- Story by: Ron Turbeville; Ron Bartron
- Produced by: Ron Silverman
- Starring: Jan-Michael Vincent; Pamela Sue Martin; Clifton James; Robert Englund; Joan Goodfellow
- Cinematography: Mario Tosi
- Edited by: Michael Kahn
- Music by: Al De Lory
- Production company: Black Creek Billie
- Distributed by: Columbia Pictures
- Release date: August 23, 1974
- Running time: 100 minutes
- Country: United States
- Language: English

Buster and Billie is a 1974 American neo noir crime film motion picture released by Columbia Pictures. The film was of the tragic romance/revenge film genres. It was directed by Daniel Petrie, whose credits include films such as Fort Apache, The Bronx (1981).

In the title roles were future Airwolf star Jan-Michael Vincent as Buster, and Joan Goodfellow as Billie. In supporting roles, Buster and Billie also featured Pamela Sue Martin as Buster's girlfriend Margie, and Robert Englund, in his film debut, in a small role as Buster's friend, Whitey.

This film is also notable as one of the earliest American mainstream movies to have male frontal nudity. Much of the movie was filmed in the towns of Metter and Register, Georgia, as well as in surrounding rural areas. Townspeople were excited the movie was being filmed and were unaware of the movie's risque plot or nudity.

== Plot ==
In a small Georgia town in 1948, Buster Lane is a popular high-school senior, who is engaged to be married to his popular high-school sweetheart Margie Hooks. He is the 'big man on campus' and the leader of his group of friends.

Buster's friends often visit a girl from an underprivileged background named Billie-Jo Truluck, who dourly gives them the sexual favors they want. Meanwhile, Buster becomes disenchanted with Margie's refusal to have sex with him, and begins seeing Billie in secret.

At first he sees Billie just for sex but eventually finds himself falling in love with her. He becomes, in fact, so taken with Billie that he breaks off his engagement with Margie and starts appearing in public with Billie, who finds a new lease on life with Buster. They are happy for the first time in their lives. Happiness for them, though, is short-lived.

Buster's friends are extremely jealous that they cannot have Billie for their own use anymore and corner her one day when they are drunk and find her out walking. When she refuses to submit to them, they rape and kill her in the heat of the moment. Buster eventually finds her dead, and is hysterical. He then goes to the pool hall where his friends are, with the guilt evident on the faces of the main perpetrators of the crime.

Enraged, Buster kills two of them, while injuring the other two. He is put into jail for this, but is released on bail the day after her funeral, which no one attends except his parents. He rips up a truckload of flowers from garden beds in the town, and takes these flowers to Billie's graveside.

== Cast ==
- Jan-Michael Vincent as Buster Lane
- Pamela Sue Martin as Margie Hooks
- Clifton James as Jake
- Robert Englund as Whitey
- Joan Goodfellow as Billie
- Jessie Lee Fulton as Mrs. Lane
- J.B. Joiner as Mr. Lane
- Dell C. Payne as Warren
- Mark Pendergraft as Mole
- David Paul Dean as Phil
- David Little as Smitty
- Vernon Beatty as Arland
- Doris Pearce as Mrs. Hooks
- Carl Reddick as Mr. Hooks
- Dale Pearce as Sally
- Lewell Akins as Photographer
- Mentoria Sills as Hat Lady
- Bruce Atkins as Sheriff
- John Chappell as Deputy
- Bob Hannah as Bus Driver (as Robert E. Hannah)
- Aaron Swain as Principal
- Quincy O. Waters as Minister
- Joyce Woodrum as Mrs. Trulove
- Jim Shirah as Mr. Trulove
- Slim Mims as himself
- Claude Casey as himself
- The Sagedusters as Themselves

== Critical reception ==
Roger Ebert, in his three (out of four) star review, wrote, "The movie’s no masterpiece, but it’s an affecting story well told, it observes its teen-age characters with a fine insight, and it almost earns its tragic ending." Lawrence Van Gelder of The New York Times stated that the film "is at once an alluring and fiercely disappointing movie that leaves one full of regret for what might have been," its chief flaw being that the characters were "types, observed keenly but unexplained, remote rather than real, remembered, but not revealed." Gene Siskel of the Chicago Tribune gave the film two stars out of four and wrote that it "crudely imitates 'The Last Picture Show'," adding, "Worse than having an implausible story line, 'Buster and Billie' makes no attempt to justify it. I can understand why Buster might leave his steady girl — she's a clothes-conscious drip — but the matchup with the emotionally troubled Billie is never justified, except as a vehicle for wringing our hearts. Contributing to the film's failure, and leaving a bad taste in our mouths, is yet another cataclysmic movie conclusion in which various acts of cruelty are performed and people die. After wallowing in forced kindness, 'Buster and Billie' concludes with forced horror." Variety criticized the ending as "hysterical, synthetic and implausible melodrama which skirts meaningful resolution. Even so, Turbeville and Petrie nicely etch social behavior in post-World War II rural America. The largely unknown cast performs with beguiling authenticity, and there are many incidental observations that transcend facile nostalgia." Charles Champlin of the Los Angeles Times called it "an assemblage of ingredients previously identified as crowd-pleasers" with "little life of its own—almost nothing of that feeling, which for all its craft 'American Graffiti' certainly had, that its creators were looking back at someplace they'd been." Gary Arnold of The Washington Post wrote that the film started out as "a pungent and authentic story," but once it turns dark "takes a rather precipitous header, going the way of gratuitously violent exploitation. The change in direction is extremely unattractive and ill-advised, and it may ruin the film's initially strong chances of popularity."

Leonard Maltin gave the film a *1/2 out of **** rating, and said it was a "blubbery account of high school romance in 1948 rural Georgia...[and that it] can't overcome [its] cliched premise." Steven Scheuer said, in his three star (out of four) review, that it was "an uneven but perceptive film" and that, in the lead roles, Vincent played his role "with strength and charm" while Goodfellow was "touching as the acquiescent town tramp."

== Music ==
The film's title song "Billie's Theme" is sung over the opening and closing credits by Hoyt Axton. A re-recorded version appeared on Axton's Life Machine album the same year of the film's release.

== See also ==
- List of American films of 1974
