= Christopher Keane =

American physicist and astronomer

Christopher J. Keane is an American physicist and astronomer currently at Washington State University and an Elected Fellow of the American Association for the Advancement of Science.
