= Casey's Shadow =

1978 drama film by Martin Ritt

- Directed by: Martin Ritt
- Screenplay by: Carol Sobieski
- Based on: "Ruidoso" by John McPhee
- Produced by: Ray Stark
- Starring: Walter Matthau; Alexis Smith; Robert Webber; Murray Hamilton
- Cinematography: John A. Alonzo
- Edited by: Sidney Levin
- Music by: Patrick Williams
- Production company: Rastar
- Distributed by: Columbia Pictures
- Release date: March 17, 1978
- Running time: 117 minutes
- Country: United States
- Language: English
- Box office: $8 million

Casey's Shadow is a 1978 Metrocolor sports drama film directed by Martin Ritt and starring Walter Matthau. The film is based on an article in The New Yorker by John McPhee ("Ruidoso", published April 29, 1974). Much of the exterior shooting was done in the city of Carencro, Louisiana, 20 miles north of Lafayette.

== Plot ==
Down-on-his-luck Louisiana horse trainer Lloyd Bourdelle dreams of winning the All American Futurity at Ruidoso Downs, New Mexico. He has three sons: Buddy, Randy and young Casey. Buddy helps his father train horses, and Randy is a jockey. Lloyd takes Casey and Randy to a small bush track to try to make some money by racing Casey's pony, Gypsy. They find a match race with Mr. Marsh and his daughter Kelly but play a trick on Marsh by tying a live chicken to Gypsy's saddle. Gypsy wins the race but Marsh does not pay, complaining that Lloyd cheated by not having a rider on Gypsy.

Lloyd had sent Buddy to buy a racing Quarter Horse for Calvin LaBec (the man for whom Lloyd trains racehorses), but Buddy returns with an old broodmare. Calvin is angry and threatens to take his horses out of Lloyd's barn until it is revealed that the mare is in foal to a stallion called Sure Hit. Calvin is placated by this information.

The mare gives birth to a colt, then dies. Casey suggests letting Gypsy nurse the colt. She has just weaned her own foal and accepts the colt, who grows into a strong two-year-old. Lloyd names the horse Casey's Shadow after his son.

A woman named Sarah Blue offers Lloyd a large sum of money for the colt. They tell her that they will not sell until after the All American, so Sarah agrees to pay $5,000 for an option contract, against a future negotiated purchase price, if she exercises the option. The option money gives the Bourdelles the funds to enter the colt in the race, so they take the horse to the local track to gallop him. While they are there, Casey runs into Mr. Marsh's daughter, who goads him into having a match race. During the race, Shadow is spooked and runs onto asphalt, hurting his legs. The vet tells Lloyd and Buddy to rest the horse for six weeks. Calvin finds out that the horse is injured but allows Lloyd to enter him in the All American.

Shadow runs in a qualifying race for the All American in which he gets the fastest time. Mr. Marsh realizes that Shadow can beat his horse and puts poison in the food bucket. However, he has poisoned the wrong horse, and Gypsy dies. Lloyd, realizing that Marsh was responsible for the pony's death, beats him up. The next day, Shadow wins the All American but comes up lame. Sarah Blue wanted to buy the colt in sound condition and is no longer interested. Calvin LaBec initially agrees with the vet that the horse should be destroyed, but Lloyd says that he will give up his share of the winnings to treat the horse. Reluctantly, the vet agrees to try to mend Shadow's legs. The operation is a success, and Lloyd and his sons take Shadow home.

== Cast ==
- Walter Matthau as Lloyd Bourdelle
- Alexis Smith as Sarah Blue
- Robert Webber as Mike Marsh
- Murray Hamilton as Tom Patterson
- Andrew Rubin as Buddy
- Stephan Gerard Burns as Randy Bourdelle
- Susan Myers as Kelly Marsh
- Michael Hershewe as Casey Bourdelle
- Harry Caesar as Calvin Lebec
- Joel Fluellen as Jimmy Judson
- Whit Bissell as Dr. Williamson
- James M. Halty as Donovan
- William Pitt as Dr. Pitt
- Dean Turpitt as Dean
- Sanders Delhomme as Old Cajun

== Reception ==
The movie was received generally well. Casey's Shadow holds an 80% rating on Rotten Tomatoes, based on 10 reviews.

== See also ==
- List of films about horses
- List of films about horse racing
