= Daniel Petrie =

Canadian film, television, and stage director (1920–2004)

- Born: Daniel Mannix Petrie; November 26, 1920; Glace Bay, Nova Scotia, Canada
- Died: August 22, 2004 (aged 83); Los Angeles, California, U.S.
- Education: St. Francis Xavier University; Columbia University
- Occupations: Director, educator, writer
- Years active: 1949–2001
- Spouse: Dorothea Grundy Petrie (m. 1946–2004)
- Children: Daniel, Donald, June, Mary

Daniel Mannix Petrie (November 26, 1920 – August 22, 2004) was a Canadian film, television, and stage director who worked in Canada, Hollywood, and the United Kingdom; known for directing grounded human dramas often dealing with taboo subject matter. He was one of several Canadian-born expatriate filmmakers, including Norman Jewison and Sidney J. Furie, to find critical and commercial success overseas in the 1960s due to the limited opportunities in the Canadian film industry at the time. He was the patriarch of the Petrie filmmaking family, with four of his children working in the film industry.

Beginning his career in television, he made his critical and popular breakthrough directing the 1961 film version of the Lorraine Hansberry play A Raisin in the Sun, which won the Gary Cooper Award at the Cannes Film Festival. He directed over 90 films and television programs until his retirement in 2001, winning several accolades (including three Primetime Emmy Awards) in the process. His semi-autobiographical 1984 film The Bay Boy won the Genie Award for Best Motion Picture.

Throughout his life, Petrie maintained strong ties to the academic world, serving as the deputy chairman of the American Film Institute from 1986 to 1987.

== Early life and education ==
Petrie was born in Glace Bay, Nova Scotia, Canada, the son of Mary Anne (née Campbell) and William Mark Petrie, a soft-drink manufacturer. He achieved a Bachelor of Arts in Communications at St. Francis Xavier University before completing a Masters in adult education at Columbia University. Petrie also served in the Canadian Army during World War II.

He moved to the United States in 1945, and began his career teaching at Northwestern University and Creighton University, where he was head of the theatre department until 1950. Although Petrie stopped teaching, he maintained a strong relationship with the academic world throughout his career, holding a faculty position at the American Film Institute, where he also acted as deputy chairman from 1986 to 1987.

== Career ==
Petrie started working as a television director in 1950 in Chicago. His early programs there included Hawkins Falls and Studs' Place. After he went to New York he worked on programs that included Circle Theatre, Elgin Hour, Justice, and Treasury Men in Action. He was chosen to be the chief director for The United States Steel Hour effective with its move to CBS in 1955.

His signature film A Raisin in the Sun (1961) was assigned to him after it was refused to its original director on Broadway, future National Medal of Arts honoree Lloyd Richards, because Richards was black. The movie maintained the award-winning cast and performances it had had on Broadway during its two-year successful run under Richards' direction, and the film version was nominated for the Palme d'Or award at the Cannes Film Festival. Petrie went on to have a fulfilling movie directing career because of the success of this movie; Richards did not get an opportunity to direct a movie again until 1995.

Petrie directed Buster and Billie (1974); the Academy Award-nominated Resurrection (1980); Fort Apache, The Bronx (1981); and Cocoon: The Return (1988).

Petrie also directed television movies, such as Sybil, Eleanor and Franklin, Eleanor and Franklin: The White House Years, The Dollmaker, My Name Is Bill W., Mark Twain and Me, Kissinger and Nixon, Inherit the Wind, and Wild Iris.

Petrie's theatrical films were rarely box-office successes, but they often featured large, well-known casts, such as The Betsy (1978), starring Laurence Olivier, Tommy Lee Jones and Robert Duvall. His films feature the earliest starring screen appearances by such stars as Winona Ryder (Square Dance - she first appeared in a supporting role in Lucas) and Kiefer Sutherland (The Bay Boy). As a television director he won multiple Emmy and Directors Guild of America Awards.

== Death ==
Petrie died of cancer in 2004 in Los Angeles, California, at the age of 83.

== Filmography ==
=== Film ===
Year	Title	Notes
1960	The Bramble Bush	Feature directorial debut
1961	A Raisin in the Sun	
1962	The Main Attraction	
1963	Stolen Hours	
1966	The Idol	
1966	The Spy with a Cold Nose	
1972	Moon of the Wolf	ABC movie of the week
1973	The Neptune Factor	First Canadian film
1974	Buster and Billie	
1976	Lifeguard	
1978	The Betsy	
1980	Resurrection	
1981	Fort Apache the Bronx	
1982	Six Pack	
1984	The Bay Boy	Also screenwriter
1987	Square Dance	
1988	Rocket Gibraltar	
1988	Cocoon: The Return	
1994	Lassie	
1997	The Assistant	Also screenwriter and producer

=== Television ===
Year	Title	Notes
1950	Studs' Place	3 episodes
1950–51	The Billy Rose Show	9 episodes
1952	Short Short Dramas	Episode: "Success Story"
1952–53	Treasury Men in Action	2 episodes
1953	The Revlon Mirror Theater	2 episodes
1954	The Motorola Television Hour	Episode: "Nightmare in Algiers"
1954	Justice	21 episodes
1954–55	Armstrong Circle Theatre	3 episodes
1954–55	The Elgin Hour	8 episodes
1954–56	Omnibus	3 episodes
1955	Studio One	Episode: "Julius Caesar"
1955–56	Joe and Mabel	6 episodes
1955–56	Goodyear Playhouse	2 episodes
1955–59	The United States Steel Hour	6 episodes
1956	Air Power	Episode: "The Early Days"
1956	The Alcoa Hour	Episode: "The Stingiest Man in Town"
1957–61	DuPont Show of the Month	6 episodes
1958	Shirley Temple's Storybook	Episode: "Rumpelstilskin"
1958	Playhouse 90	Episode: "Turn Left at Mount Everest"
1958	Kraft Television Theatre	Episode: "The Last of the Belles"
1958	Pursuit	Episode: "Epitaph for a Golden Girl"
1959	The Play of the Week	Episode: "The Cherry Orchard"
1960	The Art Carney Special	Episode: "Victory"
1960	The David Susskind Show	Episode: "6 December 1960"
1961	'Way Out	Episode: "I Heard You Calling Me"
1961	Great Ghost Tales	Episode: "William Wilson"
1962–65	The Defenders	5 episodes
1963	Bob Hope Presents the Chrysler Theatre	Episode: "One Day in the Life of Ivan Denisovich"
1963–64	East Side/West Side	3 episodes
1965	Profiles in Courage	Episode: "John Peter Altgeld"
1965	For the People	Episode: "Guilt Shall Not Escape Nor Innocence Suffer"
1965	The Doctors and The Nurses	2 episodes
1965	Seaway	2 episodes
1967	N.Y.P.D.	4 episodes
1969	Insight	Episode: "A Thousand Red Flowers"
1969	The Bold Ones: The New Doctors	Episode: "The Rebellion of the Body"
1969	Strange Report	2 episodes
1969–71	Marcus Welby, M.D.	6 episodes
1969–71	Medical Center	7 episodes
1970	The Interns	Episode: "An Afternoon in the Fall"
1970	San Francisco International Airport	Episode: "The High Cost of Nightmares"
1970–72	Ironside	2 episodes
1971	The Bold Ones: The Lawyers	Episode: "The Hyland Confession"
1971	The Man and the City	Episode: "Hands of Love"
1971	The Name of the Game	Episode: "The Showdown"
1971–73	McMillan & Wife	2 episodes
1972	Hec Ramsey	Episode: "The Century Turns"
1972–73	Banyon	2 episodes

=== Telefilms and limited series ===
Year	Title	Notes
1969	Silent Night, Lonely Night	
1971	Big Fish, Little Fish	
1971	The City	
1971	A Howling in the Woods	
1971	Young Marrieds at Play	
1972	Moon of the Wolf	
1973	Trouble Comes to Town	
1974	Mousey	
1974	The Gun and the Pulpit	
1975	Returning Home	
1976	Eleanor and Franklin	
1976	Harry S. Truman: Plain Speaking	
1976	Sybil	
1977	Eleanor and Franklin: The White House Years	
1977	The Quinns	
1984	The Dollmaker	
1985	The Execution of Raymond Graham	
1986	Half a Lifetime	
1989	My Name Is Bill W.	
1991	Mark Twain and Me	
1992	A Town Torn Apart	
1995	Kissinger and Nixon	
1996	Calm at Sunset	
1998	Monday After the Miracle	
1999	Inherit the Wind	
1999	Seasons of Love	
2001	Walter and Henry	
2001	Wild Iris	

== Awards and nominations ==
Year	Award	Category	Work	Result
1962	Directors Guild of America Award	Outstanding Directing – Feature Film	A Raisin in the Sun	Nominated
1963	Directors Guild of America Award	Outstanding Directorial Achievement in Television	The Defenders (Episode: "The Benefactor")	Nominated
1970	Directors Guild of America Award	Outstanding Directorial Achievement in Television	Silent Night, Lonely Night	Nominated
1972	Primetime Emmy Awards	Outstanding Directing for a Drama Series	The Man and the City (Episode: "Hands of Love")	Nominated
1972	Directors Guild of America Award	Outstanding Directorial Achievement in Dramatic Series - Night	The Man and the City (Episode: "Hands of Love")	Won
1977	Primetime Emmy Awards	Outstanding Directing in a Special Program - Drama or Comedy	Eleanor and Franklin	Won
1978	Primetime Emmy Awards	Outstanding Directing in a Special Program - Drama or Comedy	Eleanor and Franklin: The White House Years	Won
1985	Genie Awards	Best Screenplay	The Bay Boy	Won
1986	Primetime Emmy Awards	Outstanding Directing for a Limited Series, Movie, or Dramatic Special	The Execution of Raymond Graham	Nominated
1989	Primetime Emmy Awards	Outstanding Directing for a Limited Series, Movie, or Dramatic Special	My Name Is Bill W.	Nominated
1989	Primetime Emmy Awards	Outstanding Television Movie	My Name Is Bill W.	Nominated
1992	Primetime Emmy Awards	Outstanding Directing for a Limited Series, Movie, or Dramatic Special	Mark Twain and Me	Nominated
1992	Primetime Emmy Awards	Outstanding Children's Program	Mark Twain and Me	Won
1993	Primetime Emmy Awards	Outstanding Directing for a Miniseries or a Special	A Town Torn Apart	Nominated
2005	Directors Guild of Canada	Lifetime Achievement Award	—N/a	Won

=== Film festivals ===
Year	Festival	Category	Work	Result
1961	Cannes Film Festival	Gary Cooper Award	A Raisin in the Sun	Won
1961	Cannes Film Festival	Palme d'Or	A Raisin in the Sun	Nominated
1981	Avoriaz Fantastic Film Festival	Special Jury Award	Resurrection	Won
1997	Verona Love Screens Film Festival	Best Film	The Assistant	Nominated

== The Petrie family ==
Petrie was married for 57 years to Dorothea Grundy Petrie, an Emmy-winning film and television producer. Their sons were Daniel Jr. and Donald, both successful directors and screenwriters. Their twin daughters were former MGM executive June and actor/writer Mary. In 2002, the family was awarded the American Film Institute's Platinum Circle Award to recognise their collective creative contributions.
