= Nobody's Perfekt =

1981 film by Peter Bonerz

- Directed by: Peter Bonerz
- Written by: Tony Kenrick
- Produced by: Mort Engelberg
- Starring: Gabe Kaplan; Alex Karras; Robert Klein; Susan Clark; Arthur Rosenberg; Paul Stewart
- Cinematography: James Pergola
- Edited by: Neil Travis
- Music by: David McHugh
- Distributed by: Columbia Pictures
- Release date: August 14, 1981
- Running time: 96 minutes
- Country: United States
- Language: English
- Box office: $995

Nobody's Perfekt [sic] is a 1981 comedy film, adapted from Tony Kenrick's novel Two for the Price of One; Kenrick wrote the screenplay for this film.

== Plot ==
Three therapy patients — Dibley (Gabe Kaplan), whose memory often fails him; Swaboda (Alex Karras), who believes that his late mother is still alive and living with him; and Walter (Robert Klein), who has three personalities — want the city to buy them a new car after theirs is totaled by a pothole. Legal means prove to be insufficient, so the three of them hatch a plan to extort the money from the mayor (Arthur Rosenberg).

== Cast ==
- Gabe Kaplan as Dibley
- Alex Karras as Swaboda
- Robert Klein as Walter
- Susan Clark as Carol
- Paul Stewart as Dr. Segal
- James Cromwell as Dr. Carson
- Peter Bonerz as Randall Kendall
- John DiSanti as "Knuckles"
- Alex Rocco as The Boss
- Arthur Rosenberg as The Mayor
- Alden McKay as Mr. Freeman
- Roz Simmons as Mrs. Freeman
- Barbara Wherry as Miss West
- Al Kiggins as Colonel Brogan
- Harold Bergman as Captain
- Ken Rahger as Corporal
- Julio Mechoso as Gang Member
- Jose Fong as Gang Member
- Jorge Gil as Gang Member

== Release ==
Nobody's Perfekt made a total box office of $995.

== Reception ==
A New York Times article on the 1981 box office mentioned the film as one that "sank in a weekend without a trace".
