= Pamela Sue Martin =

American actress (born 1953)

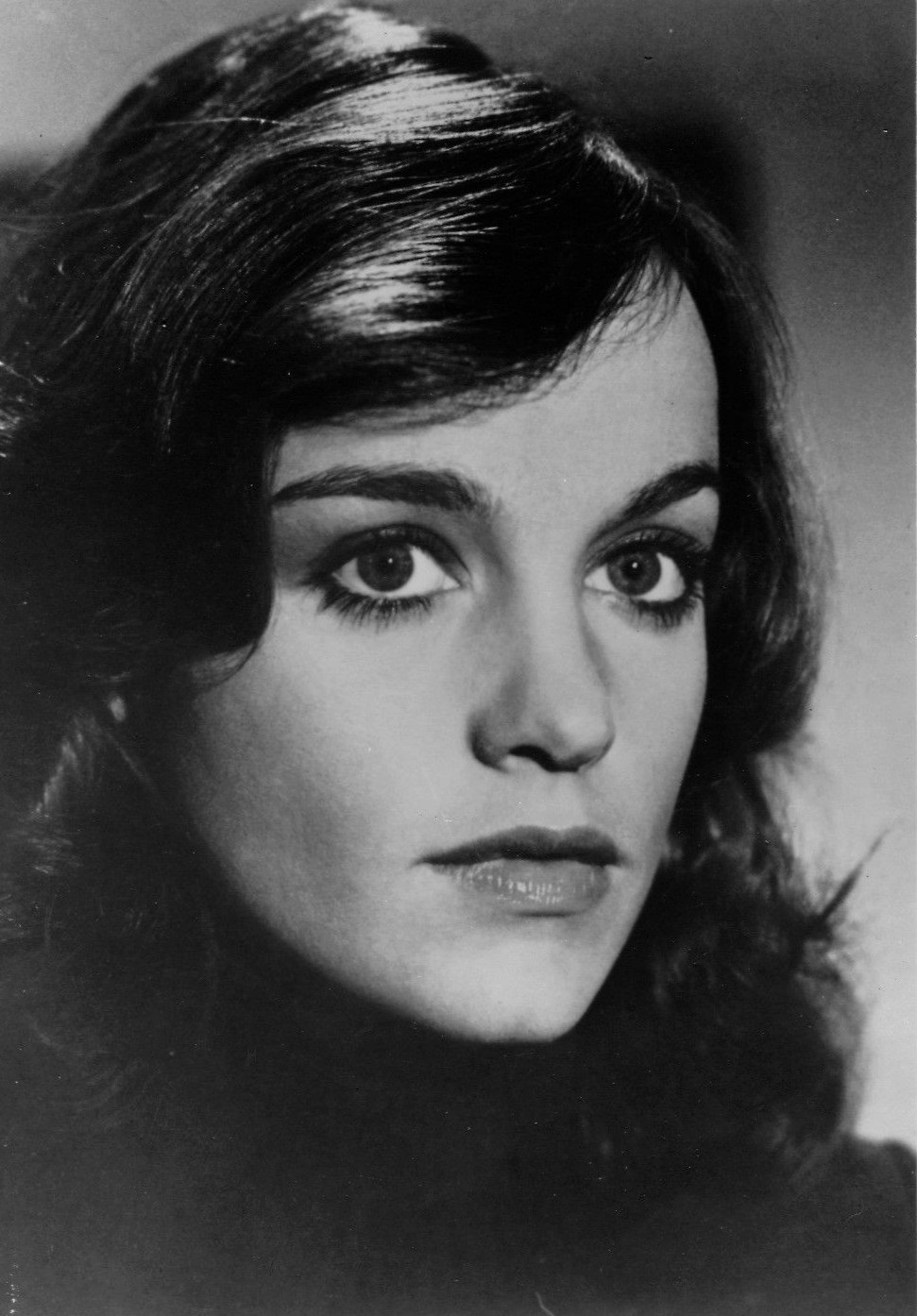
- Pamela Sue Martin as Nancy Drew, 1977
- Born: January 5, 1953 (age 73); Westport, Connecticut, U.S.
- Education: Staples High School
- Occupations: Actress; author; model
- Years active: 1968–2019
- Known for: The Poseidon Adventure; The Hardy Boys/Nancy Drew Mysteries; Dynasty; To Find a Man; Our Time
- Spouses: Charles Gates (m. 1975; div. 1979) Jorge Brusch (m. 1979; div. 1980) Manuel Rojas (m. 1982; div. 1987) Bruce Allen (m. 1990; div. 1998)
- Children: 1

Pamela Sue Martin (born January 5, 1953) is an American actress who is notable for starring as Nancy Drew on the television series The Hardy Boys/Nancy Drew Mysteries (1977–1979) and as socialite Fallon Carrington on ABC soap opera Dynasty (1981–1984), winning a Bambi Award for the latter in 1984. Her last appearance was in the 2019 pilot episode of the Nancy Drew reboot, as a character named Harriet Grosset.

== Early life, family and education ==
Martin was born in Westport, Connecticut. She graduated in 1971 from Staples High School located in Westport, Connecticut. Martin was working in a hamburger stand for $1.45 an hour before she graduated when a friend of hers told her that she was earning $60 an hour modeling in New York. Martin decided to follow in her friend's footsteps as a teen model for print ads and television commercials.

== Career ==
Martin began modeling at age 16. When she heard that Columbia Pictures was looking for girls to audition for a film called To Find a Man (1972), she decided to audition, despite the fact that she had absolutely no prior training, experience, or even ambitions in the dramatic arts. After a full three months, the producers concluded that she should be cast in the role of the lead female character. She was chosen by producer Irwin Allen to appear in The Poseidon Adventure in 1972, at age 19 based on her work in To Find a Man. More films followed, including Our Time (1974), co-starring Parker Stevenson, and Buster and Billie (1974).

At her manager's insistence, she began working in television. Later, her work as ABC-TV's Nancy Drew made her something of a teen idol. Initially, the ABC program alternated each week between The Nancy Drew Mysteries and The Hardy Boys Mysteries. In season 2, the shows were merged and renamed The Hardy Boys/Nancy Drew Mysteries, which led to Nancy's role being reduced. This frustrated Martin, who left the series as a result. Her final appearance as Nancy aired on January 1, 1978. Martin appeared in a cover pictorial in the July 1978 issue of Playboy magazine, with the headline "TV's Nancy Drew Undraped". In the magazine, she cited the merger of the two shows as her reason for quitting the series.

Martin portrayed feisty and spoiled heiress Fallon Carrington Colby on the ABC nighttime soap opera Dynasty from its debut in 1981 through to the end of the fourth season in 1984. After Martin left (of her own accord), the character was initially portrayed as "missing and presumed dead". The series recast the role with actress Emma Samms at the end of the fifth season in 1985.

Martin hosted Saturday Night Live on February 16, 1985. In the 2000s, she was artistic director of the Interplanetary Theater Group, in Idaho. After that, she has worked sporadically in film and television, with her last appearance being the 2019 pilot episode of the Nancy Drew reboot, as a character named Harriet Grosset.

== Other activities ==
In the early 1980s, Martin enjoyed scuba diving, tennis and skiing. In 1984, Martin, who has long been involved in environmental causes, appeared in a public service announcement to help save pink dolphins in the Amazon River. The ad was directed by Clyde Lucas, who appeared on The Hardy Boys/Nancy Drew Mysteries.

== Personal life ==
Martin has spoken about her struggle with interstitial cystitis.

=== Relationships and family ===
Martin has been married four times. Her first husband was Charles Gates, whom she married in 1975; they divorced in 1979. Her second marriage was to Jorge Brusch in 1979; the marriage lasted two years. After the divorce, she married Manuel Rojas; their marriage lasted for five years. Martin married Bruce Allen in 1990. This marriage lasted until 1998 and produced a son.

== Filmography ==
=== Film ===
Year	Title	Role	Notes
1972	To Find a Man	Rosalind McCarthy	Credited as Pamela Martin
1972	The Poseidon Adventure	Susan Shelby	
1974	Our Time	Abigail "Abby" Reed	
1974	Buster and Billie	Margie Hooks	
1979	The Lady in Red	Polly Franklin	
1983	Flicks	Liz Stone	
1985	Torchlight	Lillian Weller	
1990	A Cry in the Wild	June Robeson	
2010	Soupernatural	Rod	
2014	McTaggart's Fortune	Sergeant Jeanine Bowman	

=== Television ===
Year	Title	Role	Notes
1973	The Girls of Huntington House	Gail Dorn	ABC Movie of the Week
1974	The Gun and the Pulpit	Sally Underwood	ABC Movie of the Week
1976	The Hemingway Play	Dana	Movie
1976	The Quest	Ginger	Episode: "Day of Outrage"
1977–78	The Hardy Boys/Nancy Drew Mysteries	Nancy Drew	24 episodes
1978	Human Feelings	Verna Gold	Movie
1980	Fantasy Island	Velda Ferini	Episode: "The Invisible Woman/The Snow Bird"
1980	The Love Boat	Donna Dayton	Episode: "Boomerang/Captain's Triangle/Out of This World"
1981–84	Dynasty	Fallon Carrington Colby	88 episodes
1985	Saturday Night Live	Host	Episode: "Pamela Sue Martin/The Power Station"
1986	Strong Medicine	Celia Grey	Movie
1987	Alfred Hitchcock Presents	Melinda Jensen	Episode: "Anniversary Gift"
1987	J.J. Starbuck	Anchorwoman	Episode: "A Killing in the Market"
1987	Bay Cove	Linda Lebon	Movie
1990	The Saint: The Software Murders	Irina	Movie
1991	Sky Trackers	Doctor Spencer Jenkins	Movie
2002	That '70s Show	Wizard	Episode: "Tornado Prom"
2006	The L Word	Linda Kennard	Episode: "Lifeline"
2017	My Christmas Prince	Sandra Logan	Movie
2019	Nancy Drew	Harriet Grosset	Episode "Pilot"

== Awards and nominations ==
Year	Award	Work	Result	Ref.
1984	Bambi Award	Dynasty	Won	
