= Rickles =

Rickles is a surname. Notable people with the surname include:

- Dean Rickles (born 1977), English academic
- Don Rickles (1926–2017), American stand-up comedian and actor
- Donald Rickles (1927–1985), American radio and television announcer, news anchor, and actor
- Larry Rickles (1970–2011), American screenwriter, film, and television producer
- Nick Rickles (born 1990), American-Israeli baseball player
