= Wynn Irwin =

Actor and a Film Actor

Wynn Irwin (December 11, 1932 – February 15, 2018) was an American film and TV actor. He was known for his roles in From Here to Eternity (1979) and Lotsa Luck (1973).

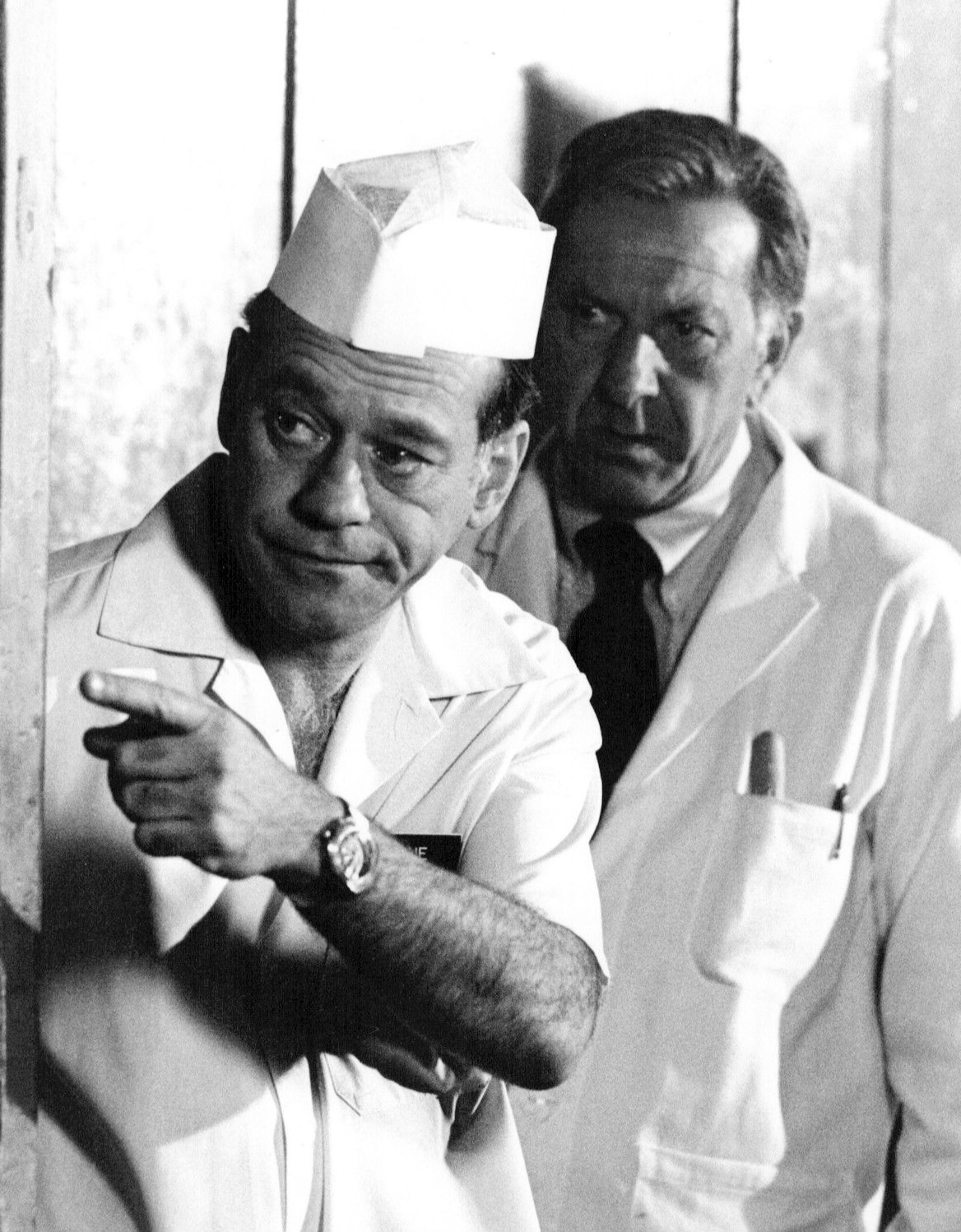
From Quincy, M.E. (1977). L-R: Wynn Irwin, Jack Klugman

Irwin was from New York City. Irwin was in and out of performing since high school, when he was in a comedy act at Catskills resorts. Then he bought and sold a small greeting cards and gift store, then returned to performing. He served in the Army and attended New York University for a few years.

Irwin played Arthur Swann from Lotsa Luck with Dom DeLuise from 1973 to 1974. Irwin has made numerous appearances in television shows like All in the Family, Barney Miller, Laverne & Shirley, The Mary Tyler Moore Show, and Hart to Hart.

He co-starred with Fannie Flagg in the television film Home Cookin' (1975)

He was reviewed for his performance in the play Marvin and Mel as coming off "like a ragpicker playing Lear".

Irwin had an ex-wife and a son, Andy. He died on February 15, 2018.

== Filmography ==
=== Film ===
Year	Title	Role	Notes
1970	Dirtymouth	Lou Hamilton	
1974	Willie Dynamite	Bailiff #1	
1975	Journey from Darkness	Danny	TV movie
1975	Winner Take All	Arnie	TV movie
1975	Home Cookin'	Ernie	TV movie
1977	Whatever Happened to Dobie Gillis?	Henshaw	TV movie
1977	Corey: For the People	Detective Phil Gilman	TV movie
1977	A Love Affair: The Eleanor and Lou Gehrig Story	Ed Barrow	TV movie
1979	Fyre	Doug	
1979	The Glove	George Morgan	
1980	Little Miss Marker	Mr. Adams	
1980	The Hunter	Informer	
1983	Hobson's Choice	A.D. Hallem	TV movie
1984	It Came Upon the Midnight Clear	Santini	TV movie
1985	Hollywood Harry	Pizza Man	
1990	Die Hard 2	Engineer	
1991	Voyager	Dick	
1994	Hart to Heart: Crimes of the Hart	Nate Gold	TV movie
1995	Bloodfist VI: Ground Zero	General Carmichael	Video
1997	Back in Business	Charlie	
1998	Dead Man on Campus	Sonny	
2004	Memron	Teddy Preston	TV movie
2004	Surviving Christmas	Costumer	Final film role
2019	Capital in the Twenty-First Century		Unknown

=== Television ===
Year	Title	Role	Notes
1971	McMillan & Wife	Lumbeyard Attendant	Episode: Husband's, Wives, and Killers (uncredited)
1972	The Super	Herbie	Episode: The Super's Apprentice
1972	Room 222	Charlie Hall	Episode: Walt Whitman Goes Bananas
1972	Emergency!	George Robinson	Episode: Trainee
1972	Ironside	Landlord	Episode: Who'll Cry for My Baby (uncredited)
1973–1974	Lotsa Luck	Arthur Swann	All Episodes
1975–1982	Barney Miller	Earl Schmidt & Mr. Felch	Episode: Ms. Cop (Earl Schmidt) & Old Love (Mr. Felch)
1975	Phyllis	Ernie	Episode: Phyllis and the Little People
1975	The Mary Tyler Moore Show	Jesse	Episode: The Happy Homemaker Takes Lou Home
1976	Starsky and Hutch	Al Taft	Episode: The Omaha Tiger
1976	Bert D'Angelo/Superstar	Juicy	Episode: Murder in Velvet
1976	Doc	Broderick	Episode: Carry On Nurse, Please
1976	Sirota's Court	Baltic	Episode: The Election
1976	Delvecchio	Pawnshop Owner	Episode: A.P.B.: Santa Claus
1977	All in the Family	Howard	Episode: Mike, the Pacifist
1977–1979	Charlie's Angels	Sam Punch & Barney	Episode: I Will Be Remembered (Sam Punch) & Counterfeit Angels (Barney)
1977	Quincy, M.E.	David Levine	Episode: The Hot Dog Murder
1977–1978	Sugar Time!	Al Marks	(12 episodes)
1978	Flying High	Bill	Episode: The Great Escape
1979	From Here to Eternity	Cpl. Leva	All Episodes
1981–1982	Hart to Hart	Lt. Grey	(10 episodes)
1982	Laverne & Shirley	Helmut	Episode: Helmut Weekend
1983	Manimal	Simmons	Episode: Manimal (Pilot)
1983	Hardcastle and McCormick	Sparky	Episode: The Boxer
1987	Fame	Dippy Dave	Episode: Best Buddies
1987	Max Headroom		Episode: Rakers
1988	It's Garry Shandling's Show	Eddie	Episode: Our Town
1989	The New Dragnet	Ken Spaford	Episode: Where's Sadie
1990	Parker Lewis Can't Lose		Episode: Close But No Guitar (uncredited)
1991	Father Dowling Mysteries	Old Cabbie	Episode: The Priest Killer Mystery
1991	The New Adam-12		Episode: Drive-By
1995	Sisters	Marv Satter	Episode: A House Divided
2001	For Your Love	Victor	Episode: The Wedding
