= The Villain (1979 film) =

1979 American Western comedy film

- Theatrical release poster
- Directed by: Hal Needham
- Written by: Robert G. Kane
- Produced by: Mort Engelberg
- Starring: Kirk Douglas; Ann-Margret; Arnold Schwarzenegger; Foster Brooks; Ruth Buzzi; Jack Elam; Strother Martin; Robert Tessier; Mel Tillis; Paul Lynde
- Cinematography: Bobby Byrne
- Edited by: Walter Hannemann
- Music by: Bill Justis
- Color process: Metrocolor
- Production company: Rastar
- Distributed by: Columbia Pictures
- Release date: July 27, 1979
- Running time: 89 minutes
- Country: United States
- Language: English
- Budget: $4.5 - 6 million
- Box office: $9.8 million

The Villain (released as Cactus Jack in the UK and Australia) is a 1979 American metrocolor Western comedy film directed by Hal Needham, with an ensemble cast including Kirk Douglas, Arnold Schwarzenegger, Ann-Margret, Paul Lynde (in his final film appearance), Foster Brooks, Strother Martin, Ruth Buzzi, Jack Elam, and Mel Tillis. It is a parody of Western films, blended with an homage to the Warner Bros. cartoon Wile E. Coyote and the Road Runner.

== Plot ==
A beautiful woman, Charming Jones, is being escorted across the west by the heroic, if naïve and slow-witted, cowboy Handsome Stranger, after claiming a large sum of money given to her by her father, Parody Jones. However, town boss Avery Simpson, who unwillingly handed the money over to Charming, conscripts an aging and inept outlaw, "Cactus Jack" Slade, to rob the duo.

Throughout the trip, Charming makes advances toward Handsome, all of which are met with indifference. Meanwhile, Cactus Jack (with the assistance of his far more intelligent and capable horse Whiskey), proceeds to lay trap after trap for the two, all of which backfire. Jack's attempt to enlist the assistance of Nervous Elk, the chief of a local American Indian tribe, also fails.

Finally, Jack confronts the couple openly, at which point Charming gives up on romancing Handsome and instead kisses Jack, who proceeds to bounce around in red-hot elation (in a manner reminiscent of Daffy Duck's classic "woo-hoo! Woo-hoo!" bounces).

== Cast ==
- Kirk Douglas as Cactus Jack Slade
- Ann-Margret as Charming Jones
- Arnold Schwarzenegger as "Handsome Stranger"
- Paul Lynde as Nervous Elk
- Strother Martin as Parody Jones
- Jack Elam as Avery Simpson
- Mel Tillis as Telegraph Agent
- Ruth Buzzi as Damsel in Distress
- Foster Brooks as Bank Clerk
- Robert Tessier as Mashing Finger

== Production ==
The film marked Hal Needham's third feature film as director and reunited him with actor Kirk Douglas. Prior to focusing on directing, Needham was one of Hollywood's top stuntmen and stunt coordinators, and although he did not receive onscreen credit, Needham worked as a stunt double for Douglas on In Harm's Way (1965), The War Wagon (1967), and The Way West (1967). Needham described The Villain as a "Road Runner cartoon done with live characters"; several of the gags are direct homages to iconic ones from the Chuck Jones cartoons, such as the sequence where Cactus Jack Slade (Douglas) paints a hole in the side of a mountain, only for the wagon to drive right through it; another is Jack being crushed by his own boulder trap.

The film was financed independently by producer Mort Engelberg and Rastar Films, a production company founded by producer Ray Stark. Engelberg and Rastar had previously produced Needham's Smokey and the Bandit in 1977.

=== Filming ===
Principal photography began 16 Oct 1978 on location in Monument Valley in Utah. Other filming sites in the state included Magma Mine, Benson, Rio Rico, the Flying V Ranch, and the Western set of Old Tucson Studios, outside Tucson, Arizona.

== Release ==
=== Lawsuit ===
In 1982, Needham sued the producers, claiming his company, Stuntman Inc., "received different treatment" in matters of equal profit participation among the parties of Rastar, Mort Engelberg, and Stuntman, Inc. In addition to asking for $250,000 in damages, Needham requested an audit of the picture's finances.

== Reception ==
=== Critical response ===
The film received generally negative reviews, criticizing the execution of the slapstick and the satire. Gene Siskel of the Chicago Tribune gave the film one star, as did Walter J. Addiego of the San Francisco Examiner; Siskel described the film as "a direct ripoff of Tex Avery's marvelous Road Runner cartoons", (Note: Although Tex Avery was involved with the earlier Looney Tunes shorts, he had no involvement in the Road Runner and Wile E. Coyote cartoons. At the time of The Villain's release, all of the shorts were created and directed by Chuck Jones.) while Addiego wrote that it contained "the sorriest collection of jokes in recent memory […] put together by a group who probably wouldn't make the grade in the Mel Brooks school of infantile humor."

Also giving the film one star was Kathleen Carroll, who in the New York Daily News, summarized it as "a hopelessly stupid Western spoof about a hopelessly stupid gunfighter who learns his bad-guy tactics from studying a pulp novel titled Badmen of the West and who invariably ends up being outsmarted by his horse." After the film premiered in Los Angeles, Los Angeles Times reviewer Linda Gross wrote:

The attitude of the entire movie is like one condescending dirty joke with lines like "What do you do when you capture a white woman?" or "I want to molest your lady friend." Robert G. Kane, who worked for several years as a writer for Dean Martin's Celebrity Roast, wrote the slim screenplay, which is full of such innuendoes. The humor has a smirky quality. Ann-Margret spends the entire movie trying to seduce Schwarzenegger, who keeps running off to gather firewood. It gets embarrassing. "The Villain is directed by former stuntman Hal Needham (Smokey and the Bandit and Hooper). Needless to say, the stunts, coordinated by Gary Combs, are pretty good, but the characters are like cartoons and the broad, burlesque humor is too simple to spoof."
