= Mort Engelberg =

American film producer (1937–2023)

- Born: August 20, 1937; Memphis, Tennessee, U.S.
- Died: December 9, 2023 (aged 86); Los Angeles, California
- Occupation: Film producer
- Notable work: Smokey and the Bandit

Mort Engelberg (August 20, 1937 – December 9, 2023) was an American film producer and later advance man for three presidential campaigns. He produced Smokey and the Bandit, The Big Easy, and The Hunter.

== Early life and career ==
Engelberg was born and raised in Memphis, Tennessee, graduated from the University of Illinois and obtained his master's degree from the University of Missouri. He worked as a journalist for several years before moving to Washington in 1961 to work for Sargent Shriver, the director of Peace Corps and later the director of the Office of Economic Opportunity, the agency responsible for administering most of the War on Poverty programs created as part of United States President Lyndon B. Johnson's Great Society program.

Engelberg left the political sphere during the Vietnam War and moved to New York City to work for Metro-Goldwyn-Mayer in 1967. He moved on to United Artists, where he worked as assistant to the president of production.

Engelberg returned to politics by working as the advance man for the presidential campaigns of Walter Mondale in 1984, for Michael Dukakis in 1988 and for Bill Clinton in 1992.

== Personal life and death ==
In 2016, he married Helaine Blatt, after a 26-year relationship.

Mort Engelberg died at a Los Angeles hospital on December 9, 2023, at the age of 86. His brother Steven stated that the cause was lung cancer.

== Filmography ==
Year	Film	Producer	Executive producer
1977	Smokey and the Bandit	Yes	
1979	Hot Stuff	Yes	
1979	The Villain	Yes	
1980	The Hunter	Yes	
1981	Nobody's Perfekt	Yes	
1983	Smokey and the Bandit Part 3	Yes	
1985	The Heavenly Kid	Yes	
1986	The Big Easy		Yes
1987	Three for the Road	Yes	
1987	Maid to Order	Yes	
1987	Dudes		Yes
1987	Pass the Ammo	Yes	
1987	Russkies		Yes
1988	Remote Control		Yes
1988	Fright Night Part 2	Yes	
1992	There Goes the Neighborhood		Yes
