= Bandit (film series) =

- Genre: Action; Comedy
- Based on: Characters created by Hal Needham
- Written by: Chris Abbott; Brock Yates; David Chisholm; Jay Huguely
- Directed by: Hal Needham
- Starring: Brian Bloom; Brian Krause
- Composers: Steve Dorff; Velton Ray Bunch
- Country of origin: United States
- Original language: English
- No. of episodes: 4

Production
- Cinematography: Michael Shea
- Editor: Stephen Lovejoy
- Running time: 91–94 minutes
- Production company: Universal Television

Original release
- Network: Syndication
- Release: January 30 – April 10, 1994

Bandit is a 1994 American action comedy television series directed by Hal Needham and produced by Universal Television for the Action Pack programming block, starring Brian Bloom as the son of Bo "Bandit" Darville, and Brian Krause as Lynn. It is the fourth installment in the Smokey and the Bandit franchise. The show premiered on January 30, and its last episode aired on April 10, 1994.

The series serves as a standalone sequel to Smokey and the Bandit Part 3 (1983) and a reboot set in 1994. Instead using the then newly released fourth generation Pontiac Trans Am at the time, the car featured as "Bandit One" in this series is a Dodge Stealth, while the original Smokey and the Bandit trilogy introduced two generations of the Pontiac Trans Am, the first two films both featured a second-generation Trans Am, while the third film featured a third-generation Trans Am.

The show's hit theme song "Another Dream Away" was performed by country music singer Dawn Sears. Sears is also featured in the opening title sequence performing the song while playing her guitar.

== Episodes ==
No.	Title	Directed by	Written by	Original release date
1	"Bandit Goes Country"	Hal Needham	Chris Abbott	January 30, 1994
Bo Darville's son (Brian Bloom) goes home for a family reunion and along the way, he meets music star Mel Tillis, who is forced to make an emergency landing when his plane malfunctions. Bo Darville's son helps Mel, but soon finds himself in hot water when his cousin Johnny (Christopher Atkins) gets into the music bootlegging business.
2	"Bandit Bandit"	Hal Needham	Brock Yates	March 13, 1994
The impostor (Gerard Christopher) lands Bo Darville's son (Bloom) in jail, he is arrested by Sheriff Enright (John Schneider of Dukes of Hazzard Fame) but he needs to break out so he can deliver a futuristic car safely to Governor Denton (Gary Collins).
3	"Beauty and the Bandit"	Hal Needham	David Chisholm	April 3, 1994
Bo Darville's son (Bloom) is on the run with Crystal "the Beauty" (Kathy Ireland), a young woman being pursued by a mobster (Tony Curtis), a bounty hunter (Joseph Cortese) and the FBI.
4	"Bandit's Silver Angel"	Hal Needham	Jay Huguely	April 10, 1994
Bo Darville's son (Bloom) gets an unexpected visit from his Uncle Cyrus (Donald O'Connor) who later dies of a heart attack, leaving his carnival to his widow Angel (Traci Lords). Bo Darville's son helps Angel face off against some shady characters smuggling stolen silver ingots hidden in the carnival.

== Home media ==
After many years of being an extremely hard-to-find series, on October 12, 2010, Universal Pictures Home Entertainment released all four episodes on DVD, along with the original Smokey and the Bandit trilogy as part of Smokey and the Bandit: The 7-Movie Outlaw Collection.

== See also ==
- Smokey and the Bandit
- Smokey and the Bandit II
- Smokey and the Bandit Part 3
