= Stroker Ace (disambiguation) =

Stroker Ace may refer to:

- Stroker Ace, the pseudonym used by William Neely for the book Stand on It, co-written with Bob Ottum

- Stroker Ace, a 1983 action/comedy movie about a NASCAR driver played by Burt Reynolds, loosely based on the book Stand on It

- "Stroker Ace," a song by Ween from their 2000 album White Pepper
- "Stroker Ace," a song by Lovage from their 2001 album Music to Make Love to Your Old Lady By
- Mike Cooley (musician), guitarist, singer and songwriter in the Drive-By Truckers, jokingly nicknamed "The Stroker Ace" by his bandmates
