= Donn Cambern =

American film editor (1929–2023)

- Born: October 9, 1929; Los Angeles, California, U.S.
- Died: January 18, 2023 (aged 93); Burbank, California, U.S.
- Occupation: Film editor

Donn Cambern (October 9, 1929 – January 18, 2023) was an American film editor with more than three dozen feature film credits. His editing of Romancing the Stone (1984) was nominated for an Academy Award for Best Film Editing along with fellow editor Frank Morriss, and his editing of Easy Rider (1969) has been noted as particularly innovative and influential. He was awarded the American Cinema Editors Career Achievement Award in 2004.

Cambern was born in Los Angeles, California, and obtained a B.A. in music from UCLA. Cambern began his career as a music editor for The Andy Griffith Show before moving into film editing. In 1970, he was hired by National General Pictures to direct a state-sponsored documentary about the rock band Blood, Sweat & Tears, but this project was canceled by the US State Department after principal photography was complete. The footage was not aired until the 2023 documentary What the Hell Happened to Blood, Sweat & Tears? which included interviews with Cambern.

Officially credited with editing The Last Picture Show (1971), Cambern's involvement was called into question in the 1999 documentary, The Last Picture Show: A Look Back. In the documentary, Peter Bogdanovich said that after shooting the film, he went back to Los Angeles to edit it on a Moviola. When finished editing the entire picture, he refused to credit himself as editor, reasoning that credits beyond that of director and co-writer would look 'ridiculous'. After being informed that the Motion Picture Editors Guild required crediting an editor, he suggested Donn Cambern who had been editing another film in the next office over and had helped Bogdanovich with some purchasing paperwork. In the documentary, Cybill Shepherd said that when she went to stay with Bogdanovich during that time, it was disappointing because he was too busy editing the film. Cambern disputes this, stating that Bogdanovich did do an edit of the film, which he screened for a selection of guests, including Jack Nicholson, Bob Rafelson and himself. The consensus was the film was going to be great, but needed further editing to achieve its full potential. Bogdanovich invited Cambern to edit the film further and Cambern made significant contributions to the film's final form.

One of Cambern's favorite stories and something for which he is often remembered is the editing of the final sequence of the Robert Wise film The Hindenburg (1975), in which Cambern manages to keep the Hindenburg blowing up for almost 10 minutes when the actual event lasted little more than 37 seconds.

In 2007, Cambern was senior filmmaker-in-residence at the American Film Institute Conservatory. Cambern had been elected as a member of the American Cinema Editors. Cambern had served twice (1990–94, 1997–99) as Vice-President of the Board of Governors for the Academy of Motion Picture Arts and Sciences. From 1991-2002, he was President of the Motion Picture Editors Guild.

Cambern was the inaugural recipient of the Guild's Fellowship and Service Award in 2007.

Cambern died of complications from a fall on January 18, 2023, at the Providence Saint Joseph Medical Center in Burbank, California. He was 93.

== Selected filmography ==
Editor
Year	Film	Director	Notes
1969	2000 Years Later	Bert Tenzer	
1969	Easy Rider	Dennis Hopper	
1971	Drive, He Said	Jack Nicholson	
1971	The Last Picture Show	Peter Bogdanovich	
1973	Blume in Love	Paul Mazursky	First collaboration with Paul Mazursky
1975	The Hindenburg	Robert Wise	
1976	Alex & the Gypsy	John Korty	
1977	The Other Side of Midnight	Charles Jarrott	
1978	The End	Burt Reynolds	
1978	Hooper	Hal Needham	First collaboration with Hal Needham
1979	Time After Time	Nicholas Meyer	
1980	Willie & Phil	Paul Mazursky	Second collaboration with Paul Mazursky
1980	Smokey and the Bandit II	Hal Needham	Second collaboration with Hal Needham
1981	Excalibur	John Boorman	Uncredited
1981	The Cannonball Run	Hal Needham	Third collaboration with Hal Needham
1981	Paternity	David Steinberg	First collaboration with David Steinberg
1982	Tempest	Paul Mazursky	Third collaboration with Paul Mazursky
1983	Going Berserk	David Steinberg	Second collaboration with David Steinberg
1984	Romancing the Stone	Robert Zemeckis	
1986	Jo Jo Dancer, Your Life Is Calling	Richard Pryor	
1986	Big Trouble	John Cassavetes	
1987	Harry and the Hendersons	William Dear	
1988	Casual Sex?	Geneviève Robert	
1988	Feds	Daniel Goldberg	
1988	Twins	Ivan Reitman	First collaboration with Ivan Reitman
1989	Ghostbusters II	Ivan Reitman	Second collaboration with Ivan Reitman
1991	Eyes of an Angel	Robert Harmon	
1991	The Butcher's Wife	Terry Hughes	
1992	The Bodyguard	Mick Jackson	
1993	Rookie of the Year	Daniel Stern	
1994	Major League II	David S. Ward	
1994	Little Giants	Duwayne Dunham	
1996	The Glimmer Man	John Gray	

Editorial department
Year	Film	Director	Role
1973	Steelyard Blues	Alan Myerson	Supervising film editor
1973	Cinderella Liberty	Mark Rydell	Supervising film editor
1993	Blood In Blood Out	Taylor Hackford	Additional film editor
1997	A Thousand Acres	Jocelyn Moorhouse	Additional editor

Producer
Year	Film	Director	Credit
1991	Eyes of an Angel	Robert Harmon	Co-producer

Second unit director or assistant director
Year	Film	Director	Role
1977	The Other Side of Midnight	Charles Jarrott	Second unit director
1982	Tempest	Paul Mazursky	Second unit director: Greece

Thanks
Year	Film	Director	Role
1998	Relax... It's Just Sex	P. J. Castellaneta	Thanks
2007	The Jinn	Iris Green	Special thanks
2009	Hurt	Barbara Stepansky	Special thanks

Documentaries

Editor
Year	Film	Director
1969	Follow Me	Gene McCabe
1969	A Session with the Committee	Del Jack

TV movies

Editor
Year	Film	Director
1969	Debbie Reynolds and the Sound of Children	Marc Breaux

Music department
Year	Film	Director	Role
1999	Boys Will Be Boys	Dom DeLuise	Composer: Additional music Music editor

TV series

Music department
Year	Title	Role	Notes
1961	Margie	Music editor	1 episode
1965	I Spy	Music editor	1 episode
1965	That Girl	Music editor	1 episode
1963−66	The Andy Griffith Show	Music editor	70 episodes
1964−66	Gomer Pyle, U.S.M.C.	Music editor	60 episodes
1968	The Ghost & Mrs. Muir	Music editor	2 episodes

TV specials

Editor
Year	Film	Director
1968	The Bob Hope Christmas Special	Morton Lachman

Thanks
Year	Title	Role
2023	96th Academy Awards	In memoriam
