= Stunts Unlimited =

- Print ad
- Genre: Action
- Written by: Laurence Heath
- Directed by: Hal Needham
- Starring: Chip Mayer
- Music by: Barry De Vorzon
- Country of origin: United States
- Original language: English

Production
- Executive producer: Lawrence Gordon
- Producer: Lionel E. Siegel
- Cinematography: Michael Shea
- Editor: Robert Phillips
- Running time: 70 minutes
- Production company: Paramount Television

Original release
- Network: ABC
- Release: January 4, 1980

Stunts Unlimited is a 1980 American action television film about stunt performers directed by Hal Needham.

== Plot ==
The ML-74 laser rifle, a rifle with a hyper-accurate laser scope that can fire 1,500 rounds between blanks and is known as "the most sophisticated weapon known to man", is stolen along with its original mold by the dangerous arms dealer Fernando Castilla, a man who has been granted diplomatic immunity for naming his associates to the government years earlier. A former U.S. Intelligence agent known as Hal hires a group of professional stunt performers to infiltrate Castilla's Cove, Castilla's pleasure palace located near Monterey, California, and retrieve the rifle as well as its mold before it is sold to its prospective buyer Axel Kalb.

== Cast ==
- Chip Mayer as Matt Lewis
- Susanna Dalton as C.C. Brandt
- Sam J. Jones as Bo Carlson
- Glenn Corbett as Dirk MacAuley
- Linda Grovenor as Jody Webber
- Alejandro Rey as Fernando Castilla
- Stefan Gierasch as Axel Kalb
- Victor Mohica as Joe Tallia
- Lina Raymond as Cora
- Alfie Wise as Tom
- Hal Needham as H.N. / "Hal"
- Arthur Weiss as Fall Director
- Richard Ziker as The Star
- John Larroquette as Leading Man
- Linda McClure as 1st Assistant Director
- Victoria Peters as Rhea
- Peaches Pook as Waitress
- Sandy Lang as 2nd Assistant Director
- Graydon Gould as Western Director
- Joe Montana as Production Assistant
- Nicholas David as Fred
- Danny Rogers as Fire Stuntman
- Alan Gibbs as Rider #1
- Monty Laird as Pistol Stuntman
- Mickey Gilbert as Horse Rider
- Walter Wyatt as Rider #2
- Stan Barrett as Tower Stuntman
- Charles Picerni as Air Stuntman
- Stefan Gudju as Gate Guard
- Maureen Cavaretta as Trapeze Lady #1
- Vicki Mathaway as Trapeze Lady #2
- Charles A. Tamburro as Bunker Guard
- Jophery C. Brown as Roving Guard
- Richard Lapp as Minor Role

== Production ==
The title of the film is an homage to the real company Stunts Unlimited, a stunt group formed by Hal Needham, Glenn Wilder, and Ronnie Rondell in 1970.

== Broadcast and reception ==
The TV movie was broadcast on ABC at 9:30 p.m. Eastern Time on January 4, 1980, as the pilot for a proposed series, but the series was not picked up.
Upon the film's broadcast, the staff of People wrote that "the idea is ingenious" and "it ought to be a series". The pilot had a Nielsen TV rating of 12.3 and was viewed in 9,380,000 homes.
