= Going Berserk =

1983 film by David Steinberg

- Theatrical release poster
- Directed by: David Steinberg
- Written by: Dana Olsen; David Steinberg
- Produced by: Claude Héroux
- Starring: John Candy; Joe Flaherty; Eugene Levy
- Cinematography: Bobby Byrne
- Edited by: Donn Cambern
- Music by: Tom Scott
- Distributed by: Universal Pictures
- Release date: October 28, 1983
- Running time: 84 minutes
- Countries: United States; Canada
- Language: English
- Budget: $6 million
- Box office: $234,950

Going Berserk is a 1983 comedy film starring John Candy, Joe Flaherty, and Eugene Levy and directed by David Steinberg. The film was released on October 28, 1983, received generally negative reviews from critics, and was a box office bomb.

== Plot ==
John Bourgignon is an amiable chauffeur and would-be drummer who is engaged to Nancy, the daughter of the disapproving United States congressman Ed Reese. As the wedding date approaches, John's sleazy film-director friend, Sal DiPasquale, blackmails the congressman into allowing him to record the ceremony. John has assorted misadventures, including being handcuffed to a dead man, running afoul of a motorcycle gang, and getting brainwashed by an aerobics cult that wants him to assassinate the congressman. The conditioning goes awry, causing John to behave like "a schmuck" and nearly ruin his engagement, but a second attempt appears to have the desired effect. At the wedding ceremony, John reveals he resisted the conditioning; the cultists are arrested, and John more or less saves the day and lives happily ever after.

== Cast ==
- John Candy as John Bourgignon
- Joe Flaherty as Chick Leff, John's friend and limo company partner
- Eugene Levy as Sal DiPasquale, a sleazy wanna-be filmmaker
- Alley Mills as Nancy Reese, John's fiancee
- Pat Hingle as Congressman Ed Reese, Nancy's father
- Ann Bronston as Patti Reese, the youngest daughter, who is also brainwashed by the aerobics cult
- Eve Brent Ashe as Mrs. Reese, Nancy's mother
- Elizabeth Kerr as Grandmother Reese
- Richard Libertini as Reverend Sun Yi Day
- Dixie Carter as Angela, Sun Yi Day's assistant
- Kurtwood Smith as Clarence, one of Sun Yi Day's associates
- Ronald E. House as Bruno, one of Sun Yi Day's associates
- Ernie Hudson as Muhammed Jerome Willy
- Frantz Turner as Wallace Jefferson, a friend of Muhammed Jerome Willy
- Gloria Gifford as Francine, Muhammed Jerome Willy's girlfriend
- Brenda Currin as Sal's Secretary
- Paul Dooley as Dr. Ted, a psychologist that Chick knows
- Julius Harris as The Judge
- Murphy Dunne as Public Defender
- Bill Saluga as Skipper / Kung Fu Leader
- Kathy Bendett as Shirley, the news reporter
- Dan Barrows as Minister
- Elinor Donahue as Margaret Anderson
- Larry Poindexter as Claudell

== Production ==
The film was announced in March 1982, with filming beginning that July. Catherine O'Hara was originally reported to be part of the cast, though did not end up appearing in the finished film. Director David Steinberg had reservations about making the film given its modest $6 million budget, short shooting schedule, and lack of a finished screenplay. Production began with two partial scripts by John Candy, Joe Flaherty, Paul Flaherty and Dick Blasucci, and much of the diakogue was later improvised by the cast. No one was satisfied with the finished product, with Candy, Flaherty, and Levy asking not to be credited as screenwriters. Candy performed all of his own stunts.

== Reception ==
Janet Maslin of The New York Times review stated, "John Candy is easily the funniest thing in Going Berserk, an affably stupid comedy that's saddled with too much plot and that hasn't nearly enough energy to go with it." Vulture Hound wrote, "Going Berserk co-written by Dana Olsen misses the mark with its bare minimum of plot to get us from scene to scene that reference films/tv shows you’d rather being watching than this movie."
