= Bobby Byrne (cinematographer) =

American cinematographer (1932–2017)

- Born: 1932; Jamaica, Queens
- Died: March 9, 2017 (aged 84–85)
- Occupation: cinematographer

Bobby Byrne (1932 – March 9, 2017) was an American cinematographer.

Born in Jamaica, Queens, Byrne initially worked as an animation cameraman prior to moving into live action cinematography. He worked in the camera department for Conrad L. Hall and William A. Fraker. Fraker assigned Byrne to work as the camera operator on his directorial debut Monte Walsh. Other credits as camera operator include Paper Moon and New York, New York.

Byrne debuted as director of photography on the 1977 comedy Smokey and the Bandit for Hal Needham. He'd work with Needham again on Hooper, as well as for The End for Burt Reynolds.

Other credits include Sixteen Candles, Bull Durham, Stealing Home, both movies with baseball themes released in 1988, and 92 episodes of the NBC sitcom Mad About You. He retired from cinematography in 2006.

Byrne joined the American Society of Cinematographers in 1994. He died on March 9, 2017.

== Early career ==
Byrne worked as a first assistant cameraman for several of the leading cinematographers of the 1960s. He was part of the camera crew on the Western The Professionals 1966), as first assistant to operator William A. Fraker and cinematographer Conrad L. Hall,and on location in Oregon in 1968 he was first assistant on the musical Paint Your Wagon, which Fraker shot. Several of his colleagues from these productions, including Fraker and Jordan Cronenweth, later became ASC members themselves.

== Feature films ==
As director of photography, Byrne's credits include Smokey and the Bandit (1977), Blue Collar, The End, Paternity, Going Berserk, Sixteen Candles (1984), The Lemon Sisters, This Is My Life, Bull Durham and Stealing Home (the latter two in 1988).

== Television ==
Byrne's television work included the series A.U.S.A., Titus, The Fighting Fitzgeralds and Happy Family, but he was best known for the sitcom Mad About You, for which he shot 92 episodes.

== American Society of Cinematographers ==
Byrne was invited to join the American Society of Cinematographers in 1994, after more than thirty years of working experience in the industry.
