= Hank Moonjean =

American film director

- Born: January 7, 1930; Evanston, Illinois, U.S.
- Died: October 7, 2012 (aged 82); Hollywood Hills, California, U.S.
- Education: University of Southern California
- Occupations: Film producer, executive producer, associate producer

Hank Moonjean (January 7, 1930 – October 7, 2012) was an American film producer, executive producer, and associate producer. His production credits included Dangerous Liaisons, Child's Play, and The Great Gatsby and several movies featuring Burt Reynolds. Moonjean and film producer Norma Heyman jointly received an Academy Award for Best Picture nomination for the 1988 dramatic film, Dangerous Liaisons.

== Life and career ==
Moonjean, who was Armenian American, was born in Evanston, Illinois. He graduated from the University of Southern California (USC). Soon after graduation from USC, he answered an employment ad for an interpreter at MGM Studios, and later became an uncredited assistant director for the 1954 film, Bhowani Junction, directed by George Cukor. He worked for MGM for eight years. He became a second director for numerous MGM films while at the studio: Blackboard Jungle, The Prodigal, It's Always Fair Weather, Love Me or Leave Me, The Tender Trap, I'll Cry Tomorrow, A Catered Affair, Kismet, Tea and Sympathy and Raintree County.

Moonjean collaborated to produce or co-produce many films starring Burt Reynolds, including The End in 1978, Hooper in 1978, Smokey and the Bandit II in 1980, Paternity in 1981, Sharky's Machine in 1981, and Stroker Ace in 1983. In 1975, Moonjean was announced as producer of The Bryna Company film Something Wicked This Way Comes, when it was set to be distributed through Paramount Pictures, but he eventually left the project.

In 2008, Moonjean released his memoir, Bring In The Peacocks: Memoirs Of A Hollywood Producer. He also donated an extensive collection of film advertisements to the Academy of Motion Picture Arts and Sciences.

Hank Moonjean died from pancreatic cancer at his Hollywood Hills residence on October 7, 2012, at the age of 82. He was survived by his partner of 51 years, Bradley Bennett.

== Filmography ==
=== Film ===
Year	Film	Credit	Notes
1966	The Singing Nun	Associate producer	
1966	Spinout	Associate producer	
1967	Welcome to Hard Times	Associate producer	
1968	The Secret Life of an American Wife	Associate producer	
1970	WUSA	Associate producer	
1972	Child's Play	Associate producer	
1974	The Great Gatsby	Associate producer	
1975	The Fortune	Executive producer	
1978	The End	Executive producer	
1978	Hooper	Producer	
1980	Smokey and the Bandit II	Producer	
1981	The Incredible Shrinking Woman	Producer	
1981	Paternity	Producer	
1981	Sharky's Machine	Producer	
1983	Stroker Ace	Producer	
1988	Stealing Home	Producer	
1988	Dangerous Liaisons	Producer	Final film as a producer

Assistant director

Year	Film	Role	Notes
1955	Blackboard Jungle	Assistant director	Uncredited
1955	Love Me or Leave Me	Assistant director	Uncredited
1955	Kismet	Assistant director	Uncredited
1956	Somebody Up There Likes Me	Assistant director	Uncredited
1956	High Society	Assistant director	Uncredited
1956	Lust for Life	Second assistant director	Uncredited
1956	The Teahouse of the August Moon	Assistant director	Uncredited
1957	Raintree County	Assistant director	Uncredited
1957	Until They Sail	Assistant director	Uncredited
1957	Jailhouse Rock	Assistant director	Uncredited
1958	Gigi	Assistant director: France	Uncredited
1958	Cat on a Hot Tin Roof	Assistant director	Uncredited
1959	The Diary of Anne Frank	Assistant director: Netherlands	Uncredited
1959	Never So Few	Assistant director	Uncredited
1960	Tall Story	Assistant director	
1960	BUtterfield 8	Assistant director	
1961	Fanny	Assistant director	Uncredited
1962	Sweet Bird of Youth	Assistant director	
1963	Drums of Africa	Assistant director	
1963	The Prize	Assistant director	
1964	The Unsinkable Molly Brown	Assistant director	
1965	The Money Trap	Assistant director	
1965	A Patch of Blue	Assistant director	
1967	Cool Hand Luke	Assistant director	
1968	The Odd Couple	Assistant director	
1968	The Secret Life of an American Wife	Assistant director	
1969	The April Fools	Assistant director	
1970	Move	Assistant director	
1970	WUSA	Assistant director	
1972	Child's Play	Assistant director	

Miscellaneous crew

Year	Film	Notes
1970	Move	Assistant to the producer
1972	Pocket Money	Production representative

Production manager

Year	Film	Notes
1970	Move	Unit production manager

=== Television ===
Year	Title	Credit	Notes
1966	The Dangerous Days of Kiowa Jones	Associate producer	Television film
1976	Beauty and the Beast		Television film

As writer

Year	Title
1959	The David Niven Show
