= Smokey and the Bandit =

1977 film by Hal Needham

- Theatrical release poster by John Solie
- Directed by: Hal Needham
- Screenplay by: James Lee Barrett; Charles Shyer; Alan Mandel
- Story by: Hal Needham; Robert L. Levy
- Produced by: Mort Engelberg; Robert L. Levy
- Starring: Burt Reynolds; Sally Field; Jerry Reed; Jackie Gleason
- Cinematography: Bobby Byrne
- Edited by: Walter Hannemann; Angelo Ross
- Music by: Bill Justis; Jerry Reed
- Production company: Rastar
- Distributed by: Universal Pictures
- Release dates: May 19, 1977 (Radio City Music Hall); July 29, 1977 (Los Angeles)
- Running time: 96 minutes
- Country: United States
- Language: English
- Budget: $4.3 million
- Box office: $300 million

Smokey and the Bandit is a 1977 American action comedy road film starring Burt Reynolds, Sally Field, Jackie Gleason, Jerry Reed, Pat McCormick, Paul Williams, and Mike Henry. The film marks the directorial debut of stuntman Hal Needham.

The film follows Bo "Bandit" Darville (Reynolds) and Cledus "Snowman" Snow (Reed), two truck-driving bootleggers attempting to illegally transport 400 cases of Coors beer from Texarkana to Atlanta. During their run, they are pursued by Sheriff Buford T. Justice (Gleason), of Montague County, Texas, after his son's runaway bride Carrie (Field) joins The Bandit and Snowman in their rum-run.

Smokey and the Bandit was a box office success following initial screenings at drive-in theaters across the Southern United States that prompted Universal to reopen the film nationwide, grossing $127 million ($526 million in 2025) against a $4.3 million ($17.8 million in 2025) budget, becoming the second-highest-grossing domestic film of 1977 in the United States, behind Star Wars.

The film became the first installment in the Smokey and the Bandit franchise and the first film of the Smokey and the Bandit trilogy.

== Plot ==
Wealthy Texan capitalist Big Enos Burdette and his son, Little Enos, frequently bet notable truckers in Atlanta to bootleg 400 cases of Coors beer from Texarkana, Texas, to Atlanta in 28 hours, but all have failed with many being arrested. They find local legend Bo "Bandit" Darville at a truck rodeo at Lakewood Fairgrounds and offer him $80,000 (equivalent to $440,860 in 2026) to take the bet. The Bandit accepts and recruits his friend Cledus "Snowman" Snow and Fred, Cledus' Basset Hound, to drive the truck, while Bandit drives a black 1977 Pontiac Trans Am (Trigger) as a "blocker" to divert attention away from the truck and its illegal cargo.

The pair arrives in Texarkana an hour early and load the truck, but as they begin their return journey, Bandit is intercepted by Carrie, a runaway bride who suddenly jumps into his car. Unbeknownst to him, this makes Bandit an indirect target of Sheriff Buford T. Justice, a seasoned Texas law enforcement officer whose dimwitted son, Junior, was supposed to marry Carrie. The Justice father and son engage in a high-speed hot pursuit, doggedly chasing Bandit all the way to Georgia to retrieve Carrie and arrest the Bandit. Successive comical mishaps cause Justice's cruiser to experience increasing damage along the way.

Bandit attracts more police attention across Dixie as Cledus barrels toward Atlanta with the contraband beer. They are helped en route by many colorful characters via CB radio. Neither Buford nor any other lawmen are aware of Cledus's illegal manifest, while Bandit is likewise unaware that Buford is chasing him because of Carrie.

Just after re-entering Georgia, Cledus is rescued by Bandit after being pulled over by a Georgia State Patrol motorcycle trooper, as state and local police intensely pursue Bandit with roadblocks and a helicopter to track his movement. With 4 mi (6.4 km) remaining, Bandit, discouraged by the unexpected mounting attention, is ready to relent, but Cledus, who initially thought they would fail, takes the lead and smashes through the roadblock at the fairgrounds' main entrance. They reach their destination with ten minutes to spare. However, instead of taking the winnings, Carrie and Bandit accept a double-or-nothing offer from Little Enos: a challenge to run up to Boston and bring back a shipment of clam chowder in 18 hours. They quickly escape in Big Enos's 1974 Cadillac Eldorado convertible as police flood the racetrack.

Buford arrives at the fairgrounds, his cruiser now a barely functioning wreck. When Bandit passes him, he uses his CB to contact Buford, and the pair briefly exchange some mutual respect before Buford demands to understand Bandit's whereabouts. Bandit initially directs him to the Burdettes, but he then respectfully gives his real location right behind Buford, who continues his chase, leaving Junior behind, and with more parts falling off his cruiser as he limps off after Bandit.

== Cast ==
- Burt Reynolds as Bo "The Bandit" Darville
- Sally Field as Carrie "Frog"
- Jerry Reed as Cledus "The Snowman" Snow
- Jackie Gleason as Sheriff Buford T. Justice / "Smokey Bear"
- Mike Henry as Junior Justice
- Pat McCormick as Enos "Big Enos" Burdette
- Paul Williams as Enos "Little Enos" Burdette
- Macon McCalman as Mr. B
- Susan McIver as "Hot Pants" Hillyard
- George Reynolds as Sheriff George Branford
- Laura Lizer Sommers as "Little Beaver"
- Michael Mann as Branford's Deputy
- Lamar Jackson as "Sugar Bear"
- Ronnie Gay as Georgia Trooper
- Quinnon Sheffield as Alabama Trooper
- Alfie Wise as Alabama Patrolman
- Pat Hustis as Tow Truck Driver
- Ingeborg Kjeldsen as Foxy Lady
- Michael McManus as Trucker "Silver Tongued Devil"
- Gene Witham as Leader of The Gang
- Susan Sindelar as Motorcycle Gang Member
- Ben Jones as Trucker #1
- Joe Klecko as Trucker #2
- Hank Worden as Trucker #3
- Sonny Shroyer as Motorcycle Cop (uncredited)

== Production ==
=== Development ===
Hal Needham originally planned the film as a low-budget B movie with a production cost of $1 million, with Jerry Reed as Bo "The Bandit" Darville. Needham had great difficulty getting any studios or producers to take his project seriously, being better known in the film industry as a stuntman. He obtained the attention of studios and aimed the film at a more mainstream release after his friend Burt Reynolds read the script and agreed to portray the Bandit, with Reed now portraying the Bandit's friend Cledus "The Snowman" Snow. Reed would eventually play the Bandit in Smokey and the Bandit Part 3, in which Reynolds only appeared in a cameo near the end. At the time, Reynolds was the top box office star in the world.

In the original script, Carrie was called Kate while Big Enos and Little Enos Burdette were called Kyle and Dickey. The Bandit's car was a second-generation Trans Am and the prize for completing the run was a new truck rather than $80,000. Reynolds revealed in his autobiography that Needham had written the first draft script on legal pads. Upon showing it to his friend, Reynolds told Needham that it was the worst script he had ever read, but that he would still make the movie. Most of the dialogue was improvised on set.

Universal Studios bankrolled Smokey and the Bandit for $5.3 million, figuring it was a good risk. Just two days before production was to begin, Universal sent a "hatchet man" to Atlanta to inform Needham that the budget was being trimmed by $1 million. With Reynolds' salary at $1 million, Needham was left with only $3.3 million to make the film. Needham and assistant director David Hamburger spent 30 hours revising the shooting schedule.

Buford T. Justice was the name of a real Florida Highway Patrolman known to Reynolds's father Burt Sr., who was once police chief of Riviera Beach, Florida. His father was also the inspiration for the word "sumbitch" used in the film, a variation of the phrase "son-of-a-bitch" that, according to Reynolds, he uttered quite often. Jackie Gleason was given free rein to ad-lib dialogue and make suggestions. It was his idea to have Junior (Mike Henry) alongside him throughout the film. In particular, the scene where Sheriff Justice unknowingly encounters the Bandit in a roadside diner (a "choke and puke" in CB lingo) was not in the original story but was rather Gleason's idea.

The film's theme song, "East Bound and Down", was written virtually overnight by Reed. He gave Needham a preview of the song and, getting no reaction, offered to rewrite it. In response, Needham told Reed that he liked the song so much that if Reed changed even a word or a note, Needham would "choke him". It became one of Reed's biggest hits and his signature song.

The film features the custom clothing and costuming of Niver Western Wear of Fort Worth, Texas. Niver provided much of the western attire worn in the film, as well as the custom-made sheriff's uniforms Gleason wore throughout the film.

While made to take advantage of the ongoing 1970s CB radio fad, the film added to the craze. Though the film Moonrunners (1975) is the precursor to the television series The Dukes of Hazzard (1979–1985), from the same creator and with many identical settings and concepts, the popularity of Smokey and the Bandit and similar films helped get the Dukes series on the air. Three actors from the main cast of The Dukes of Hazzard appear in small uncredited roles in Smokey and the Bandit: Ben Jones, John Schneider, and Sonny Shroyer (who played a police officer in both). In return, Reynolds portrayed Boss Hogg (originally portrayed by Sorrell Booke) in the film adaptation The Dukes of Hazzard (2005). Reynolds is referenced by name in several early episodes of the series.

=== Casting ===
Before Gleason was cast in the film, Richard Boone was originally considered for the role of Buford T. Justice. Sally Field only accepted the part after her agent advised her that she needed a big movie role on her résumé. Universal executives initially resisted casting Field, claiming she was not attractive enough, but Reynolds insisted on her involvement. Field enjoyed making the film, but remembers that virtually the entire project was improvised.

=== Filming ===
Principal photography of the film began on August 30, 1976. The movie was primarily filmed in Georgia, in the cities of McDonough, Jonesboro and Lithonia. The scenes set in Texarkana were filmed in Jonesboro and the surrounding area and many of the chase scenes were filmed in the surrounding areas on Highway 54 between Fayetteville and Jonesboro for a majority of the driving scenes, Mundy's Mill Road, Main Street in Jonesboro, Georgia State Route 400, I-85 (Pleasant Hill exit) and in McDonough. However, the scene where they drive through the Shell gas station was filmed in Ojai, California, on the corner of Ojai Avenue and El Paseo Road. Much of the surrounding scene comes from that immediate vicinity. The scene featuring the racetrack was filmed at Lakewood Speedway at the old Lakewood Fairgrounds on Atlanta's south side. The roller coaster in the movie was the Greyhound. It had not been used for some time and was repainted for the film. It was destroyed in Smokey and the Bandit II and in a flashback scene in Part 3. The area around Helen, Georgia, was used for some locations. The scene where Sheriff Justice's car has the door knocked off by a passing semi-truck was shot on Georgia State Route 75, 3 miles (4.8 km) north of Helen. The tow truck driver was a local garage owner, Berlin Wike. Reynolds and Field began dating during the filming.

According to an interview with Susie McIver Ewing on The RetroZest Podcast, she was picked to play the role of Hot Pants Hilliard after the dailies footage (shot in the Atlanta area) of the original actress playing the role was inadvertently destroyed on its way from Atlanta to Los Angeles. The new Hot Pants scene had to quickly be refilmed as a part of a second unit in the San Fernando Valley and was shot at a drive-in restaurant near Hansen Dam named Baby Beef Burgers, which has since been demolished. This same restaurant was used for a scene in the 1983 Stephen King Movie Christine, which was ultimately cut in the final film (it can be viewed as a deleted scene on the DVD release of the film).

=== Vehicles ===
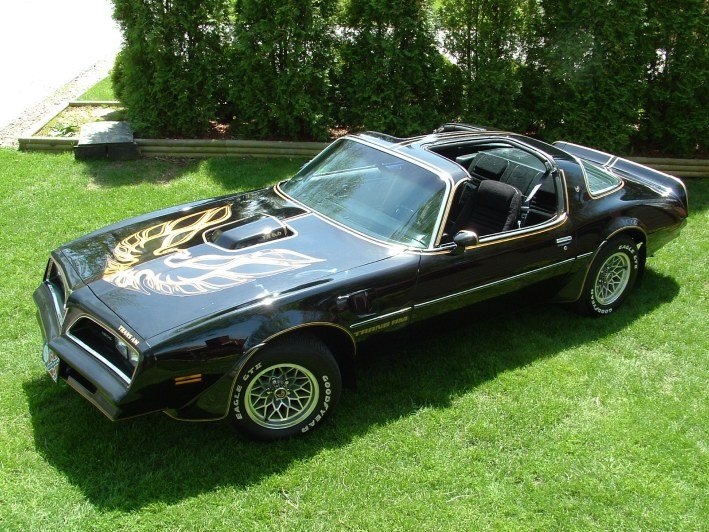
A 1978 Pontiac Firebird Trans Am in a similar specification to the car used in the movie

Hal Needham saw an advertisement for the soon-to-be-released 1977 Pontiac Trans Am and knew right away that it would be the Bandit's car, or, as Needham referred to it, a character in the movie. He contacted Pontiac and an agreement was made that four 1977 Trans Ams and two Pontiac LeMans four-door sedans would be provided for the movie. The Trans Ams were actually 1976-model cars with 1977 front ends (from 1970 to 1976, both the Firebird/Trans Am and Chevrolet Camaro have two round headlights and in 1977, the Firebird/Trans Am was changed to four rectangular headlights, and the Camaro remained unchanged). The decals were changed to 1977-style units, as evidenced by the engine size callouts on the hood scoop being in liters rather than cubic inches, as had been the case in 1976. The hood scoop on these cars says "6.6 LITRE", which, in 1977, would have denoted an Oldsmobile 403-equipped car or a non-W-72, 180 hp version of the 400 Pontiac engine.

The cars were 1976 models, the engines fitted to them were 455 cu in (7.5 L) power plants, the last year these engines were offered for sale before withdrawal. All four of the cars were badly damaged during production, one of which was all but destroyed during the jump over the dismantled Mulberry bridge. Needham served as the driver for the stunt (in place of Reynolds), while Lada St. Edmund was in the same car (in place of Field). By the film's ending, the final surviving Trans Am and LeMans were both barely running and the other cars had become parts donors to keep them running. This gives rise to various continuity errors with Justice's police cruiser, which during some chase sequences is shown with a black rear fender, which then reverts to the car's bronze color again in later scenes. The car also sustains visible damage in various collisions which then disappears in later scenes.

The Burdettes' car is a 1974 Cadillac Eldorado convertible painted in a "Candy Red" color scheme and is seen briefly at the beginning of the movie and in the final scene as the Bandit, the Snowman, Fred the dog, and Frog use it to make their escape. Three Kenworth W900 A short-frame semi trucks, driven by Reed, were each equipped with 38-inch sleepers. Two units were 1974 models, as evidenced by standard silver Kenworth emblems on the truck grille, and one unit was a 1973 model, as evidenced by the gold-painted Kenworth emblem on the truck's grille, signifying Kenworth's 50 years in business. The paint code for each truck was coffee brown with gold trims and the 48-foot (15 m) mural trailer used was manufactured by Hobbs Trailers in Texas with a non-operational Thermo King Refrigeration unit. This is obvious, because there is no fuel tank on the underside of the trailer to power the refrigeration unit, and the unit is never heard running.

=== Legal status of Coors beer ===
In 1977, Coors was unavailable for sale east of Texas. Its lack of additives and preservatives meant that Coors could spoil in one week without refrigeration, explaining the film's 28-hour deadline. A 1974 Time magazine article explains that Coors was so coveted for its lack of stabilizers and preservatives, and Coors Banquet Beer had a brief renaissance. Future President Gerald Ford, after a trip to Colorado, hid it in his luggage to take it back to Washington, D.C. President Dwight D. Eisenhower had a steady supply airlifted by the Air Force to Washington. Carl Yastrzemski of the Boston Red Sox would bring home several cases, after playing on the West Coast, by stashing them in the equipment trunks on the team's plane. Frederick Amon smuggled it once a week from Colorado to North Carolina and sold it for four times the retail price.

Coors, now owned jointly by the Coors and Molson families and based in Montréal, Quebec, is still brewed just outside Denver, Colorado. It is now sold in all states, as Molson ships it in refrigerated train cars and bottled locally and sold in different parts of the country, including the eastern United States.

== Soundtrack ==
Smokey and the Bandit: Music from the Original Motion Picture Soundtrack

Soundtrack album by Jerry Reed and Bill Justis
- Released: 1977
- Genres: Truck-driving country; country; bluegrass
- Length: 41:11
- Label: MCA
- Producer: Sonny Burke

Singles from Smokey and the Bandit: Music from the Original Motion Picture Soundtrack
- 1. "East Bound and Down" Released: August 1, 1977

The theme music "East Bound and Down" was sung and co-written by Reed (credited under his birth name, Jerry Hubbard) and Dick Feller. It became Reed's signature song and is on multiple albums, including Country Legends and his live album Jerry Reed "Live!" (Still). In 1991, it was arranged for orchestra by Crafton Beck and recorded by Erich Kunzel and the Cincinnati Pops Orchestra for their album Down on the Farm. Several other groups, such as the U.S. rock band Tonic and U.K.-based country cover band We Be Ploughin' have also covered it. Reed also penned and performed the song for the opening credits, titled "The Legend", which tells of some of the Bandit's escapades before the events of the film, and the ballad "The Bandit", which is in several versions in the movie and on the soundtrack. Bill Justis is the first name on the credits for the soundtrack, as he composed and arranged original music throughout the film. Musicians such as Beegie Adair and George Tidwell played on the soundtrack. Five-string banjo player Bobby Thompson is prominent toward the end of "East Bound and Down". The soundtrack album was released in 1977 on vinyl, cassette, and 8-track through MCA Records.

Track listing
No.	Title	Writer(s)	Length
1.	"The Legend"	Jerry R. Hubbard	2:09
2.	"Incidental CB Dialogue" (Voice ["Bandit"] – Burt Reynolds, Voice ["Snowman"] – Jerry Reed)		0:28
3.	"West Bound And Down"	Jerry R. Hubbard, Dick Feller	2:45
4.	"Foxy Lady"	Bill Justis	2:51
5.	"Incidental CB Dialogue" (Voice ["Bandit"] – Burt Reynolds, Voice ["Smokey"] – Jackie Gleason, Voice ["Snowman"] – Jerry Reed)		0:56
6.	"Orange Blossom Special"	Ervin T. Rouse	2:40
7.	"The Bandit"	Dick Feller	3:00
8.	"March Of The Rednecks"	Bill Justis	2:22
9.	"If You Leave Me Tonight I'll Cry,"	Gerald Sanford, Hal Mooney	2:47
10.	"East Bound and Down (Incidental CB Dialogue Included)" (Voice ["Bandit"] – Burt Reynolds, Voice ["Snowman"] – Jerry Reed)	Jerry R. Hubbard, Dick Feller	4:42
11.	"The Bandit"	Dick Feller	2:48
12.	"And The Fight Played On!"	Bill Justis	2:22
13.	"Ma Cousin Plays Steel"	Bill Justis	3:11
14.	"Hot Pants Fuzz Parade"	Bill Justis	4:48
15.	"Incidental CB Dialogue" (Voice ["Bandit"] – Burt Reynolds, Voice ["Smokey"] – Jackie Gleason)		1:05
16.	"The Bandit (Reprise)"	Dick Feller	2:17
Total length:			41:11

== Reception ==
=== Box office ===
Smokey and the Bandit was a sleeper hit. It premiered at Radio City Music Hall in New York City, where it performed poorly. It then opened in just the South of the United States over the Memorial Day weekend and grossed $2,689,851 in 386 theaters. By the end of June, it had played in major Southern markets, including Charlotte, Atlanta, Jacksonville, New Orleans, Memphis, Dallas, and Oklahoma City, grossing $11.9 million. It opened in other Northern states at the end of July. With an original budget of $5.3 million (cut to $4.3 million two days before initial production), the film eventually grossed $126,737,428 in North America, making it the second-highest-grossing movie of 1977 (only Star Wars earned more, with $221.3 million). The worldwide gross is estimated at over $300 million. Reynolds said in 2015 that he most enjoyed this film, and had the most fun making it, of his career.

=== Critical response ===
On the review aggregation website Rotten Tomatoes, the film has an approval rating of 71% based on 38 reviews. The site's critics consensus states: "Not much in the head but plenty beneath the hood, Smokey and the Bandit is infectious fun with plenty of car wrecks to keep your eyes glued". Metacritic, which uses a weighted average, assigned the film a score of 50 out of 100, based on six critics, indicating "mixed or average" reviews.

Film critic Leonard Maltin gave the film a good rating (3 stars out of a possible 4) and characterized it as "about as subtle as The Three Stooges, but a classic compared to the sequels and countless rip-offs which followed". In his review in the Chicago Tribune, Gene Siskel gave the film two stars and complained that the film failed to tell the audience when the clock started on the beer run, thus reducing suspense. He claimed that the Bandit is never made aware of Frog (Field)'s leaving Junior at the altar, which is why the Bandit continually asks why a Texas sheriff is chasing him. The film's editors, Walter Hannemann and Angelo Ross, were nominated for the Academy Award for Best Film Editing at the 50th Academy Awards.

Alfred Hitchcock claimed that the film was one of his favorites. Upon meeting Reynolds, Billy Bob Thornton told him that Americans from the region where the film is set consider the film to be less cinema and more documentary. Smokey and the Bandit was released in the United Kingdom on August 28 and was a success there, garnering positive reviews.

In 2025, The Hollywood Reporter listed Smokey and the Bandit as having the best stunts of 1977.

- American Film Institute Lists
  - AFI's 100 Years...100 Laughs – Nominated
  - AFI's 100 Years...100 Thrills – Nominated
  - AFI's 100 Years...100 Heroes and Villains:
    - Bandit (Bo Darville) – Nominated Hero
    - Buford T. Justice - Nominated Villain

== Cultural influence ==
=== Pontiac Trans Am ===
After the debut of the film, the Pontiac Trans Am became wildly popular, with sales almost doubling within two years of the film's release. It outsold its Chevrolet Camaro counterpart for the first time. Reynolds was given the 1977 vehicle used during promotion of the film as a gift, though the car itself never actually appeared in the film. Because of the popularity of the film and the sales success of the Trans Am, the president of Pontiac Alex Mair promised to supply Reynolds with a Trans Am each year. Due to his financial difficulties in 2014, Reynolds put his vast collection of artwork and memorabilia up for auction, including the Trans Am. High estimates for the car were up to $80,000, but the actual sale price was $450,000. Also up for auction was a go-kart replica of the car, which sold for nearly $14,000. In 2015, a Florida-based automobile customization company built 77 Trans Ams modeled after the car that Reynolds drove in the film. These new models were built off the same Camaro platform, came with the Pontiac arrowhead, flaming bird, and Bandit logos, and the instrument panels, center consoles, and hood scoops emulating their 1977 counterparts, and were signed by Reynolds. Some differences included the use of a supercharged 454 cu in (7.4 L) Chevrolet-sourced engine that put out 840 HP, and four round headlights, which appeared on the 1967–69 Firebirds/Trans Ams only; the actual 1977–81 models had rectangular headlights.

=== The Dukes of Hazzard ===
A TV series, titled The Dukes of Hazzard, was produced by Warner Bros. Television and created by Gy Waldron. It was aired on CBS from January 26, 1979 to February 8, 1985, which was inspired by the movie's success. Elements from the movie influenced the show, such as Sally Field's character in the movie, whose costuming was notably similar to Daisy Duke and featured small shorts.

=== Diablo sandwich ===
The "diablo sandwich" ordered by Sheriff Justice in the Arkansas barbecue restaurant scene has entered popular culture as a minor reference to the film. Though no authoritative source identifies the composition of the sandwich, there are several possibilities. A segment of the CMT program Reel Eats used a sloppy joe-style recipe consisting of seasoned ground beef, corn, and sour cream. Other sources in East Texas (whence Sheriff Justice hails) are familiar with the popular regional delicacy known as the Diablo Sandwich. It consists of any of the various Louisiana-style hot sauces on Texas toast-style bread alongside the fourth most famous product of Pittsburg, Texas (behind Pilgrim's Pride, Cavender's, and Carroll Shelby)—Pittsburg Hot Links.

=== The Bandit Run ===
The first run in 2007 to celebrate the 30th anniversary of the movie, The Bandit Run was the brainchild of Dave Hall, owner of Restore A Muscle Car. A group of Trans Am owners and fans of the movie take part in an annual road trip from Texarkana to Jonesboro, recreating the route taken by the characters in the film. The Bandit Run quickly became a fixture, celebrating the 40th anniversary of the movie with a special 2017 screening of the film attended by Reynolds and a recreation of the jump undertaken by the Bandit and Frog across a river.

=== Mobil 1 commercial ===
In 2014, petroleum company Mobil 1 produced television commercials, featuring then-NASCAR driver Tony Stewart, closely based on the film. Called Smoke is the Bandit and playing on Stewart's nickname, the commercials featured him as the Bandit opposite commentators Darrell Waltrip as the Snowman and Jeff Hammond as Buford T. Justice. The story replaced the Coors beer with Mobil 1 products. The advertisements lampoon the film and feature a Pontiac Trans Am and a cover version of the song East Bound and Down. The commercials were produced after Stewart mentioned that the movie was one of his favorites.

== Television censorship and alternative versions ==
When Smokey and the Bandit first aired on American network television in early 1979, censors were faced with the challenge of toning down the raw language of the original film. For this purpose, they overdubbed dialogue deemed offensive, which was common practice. The most noted change made for network broadcast was the replacing of Buford's often-spoken phrase "sumbitch" (a contraction of "son of a bitch"; usually in reference to the Bandit) with the phrase "scum bum". This phrase achieved a level of popularity with children and the 2007 Hot Wheels release of the 1970 Firebird Trans Am has "scum bum" emblazoned on its ducktail.

Except for Gleason, the original actors mostly redubbed their lines for the television version. Actor Henry Corden, who voiced Fred Flintstone after original performer Alan Reed died the same year the film was released, was used to replace a considerable amount of Sheriff Justice's dialogue. In the U.K., the heavily dubbed version was shown for several years, particularly by the BBC. However, in more recent years, the original version has been shown (on ITV, a commercial channel), usually with the stronger language edited out, often quite awkwardly. The theatrical release has a few lines deleted, including an edit in which Sheriff Justice tells a state trooper to "fuck off" after the sheriff called his vehicle "a piece of crap". His expletive is obscured when a passing big rig sounds its horn. At the time, using "fuck" would immediately require an R rating and this self-censorship allowed the film to avoid this rating and reach a much larger audience, however the scene and the obscured expletive were played for comedy value and written as such, with the passing truck being the gag of the scene more than a way to avoid the censors.

In 2006, a DVD re-release was issued of Smokey and the Bandit featuring a digitally remastered audio track with 5.1 Dolby-compatible surround sound. Many of the film's original sounds were replaced. For instance, the diesel engine start and run-up sequence in the opening sequence of the film were completely dubbed over with a new sound. A few other examples of sound effect replacement occur when the Bandit takes off after getting the reluctant Cledus involved in the bet, the Bandit comes to a screeching halt on a roadway moments before picking up Carrie, and when Buford's car top comes off. Some of the original sound effects (such as Cledus's dog Fred barking) and music (such as the final chase to the Southern Classic) were removed and not replaced. Earlier DVD releases and the 40th Anniversary Blu-ray of the film have the original soundtrack intact. Major portions of the audio background have been modified with different engine sounds or tire squeals from the original film. The updated version of the film features sound inaccurate for what would be produced by the Trans Am or the numerous other Pontiac vehicles in the film. The original film had correct sounds that were usually recorded live as the action took place.

== Sequels ==
The film was followed by two theatrical sequels: Smokey and the Bandit II (1980) and Smokey and the Bandit Part 3 (1983). The second film was a modest box office success, earning $66.1 million against a $17 million budget.

The third film – which had no involvement from either Hal Needham or Sally Field and contained only a short cameo appearance by Burt Reynolds – revolved entirely around Jackie Gleason's character, was panned by critics, and was a box office bomb, earning only $7 million against a $9 million budget.

== Television ==
=== Bandit (1994) ===
A Smokey and the Bandit standalone sequel and reboot TV series was produced and aired in 1994 for Universal Television's Action Pack with actor Brian Bloom playing as the son of Bo "Bandit" Darville. The three original films introduced two generations of the Pontiac Trans Am and the Dodge Stealth in the TV series.

=== Smokey and the Bandit (TV series) ===
In October 2020, a Smokey and the Bandit TV series was revealed to be in development, with a pilot written by David Gordon Green and Brian Sides and also executive produced with his Rough House Pictures confederates Jody Hill, Danny McBride and Brandon James, as well as Seth MacFarlane and Erica Huggins of Fuzzy Door.

=== Sheriff Justice ===
Universal and Netflix partnered with two Missouri natives for a Smokey and the Bandit prequel TV series, and filming began on July 5, 2026. Starring Sean Bailey as Sheriff Buford T. Justice (originally played by Jackie Gleason), and Jason Bobbitt as Junior (originally played by Mike Henry).

== Documentary ==
The Bandit (2016) is a documentary film about the making of Smokey and the Bandit and working with director and stuntman Hal Needham. Featuring interviews with Burt Reynolds and the crew, the film explores the unique relationship between Reynolds and Needham. The film was directed by Jesse Moss.

== See also ==
- The Cannonball Run
- Hooper
