= The Story of Wish You Were Here =

- Directed by: John Edginton
- Produced by: Joss Crowley; Alan Ravenscroft; Greg Swanborough; Andrew Winter
- Starring: Pink Floyd
- Cinematography: Graham Day
- Edited by: Merril Stern
- Music by: Pink Floyd
- Distributed by: Eagle Rock Entertainment
- Release date: 26 June 2012
- Running time: 85 min approx.
- Country: United Kingdom
- Language: English

The Story of Wish You Were Here is a television documentary about the making of Pink Floyd's 1975 album Wish You Were Here. After being shown on a few television channels, such as BBC Four, it was released on 26 June 2012, on DVD and Blu-ray.

The film gives an extensive insight of concept, recording the songs and designing the album cover. It includes exclusive interviews with almost every key person, who participated in producing the album. It is the second Pink Floyd documentary by Eagle Rock, the previous being The Making of the Dark Side of the Moon (2003).

The band is represented by all three surviving members – David Gilmour, Nick Mason, and Roger Waters. Other participating people include: Joe Boyd, Venetta Fields, Jill Furmanovsky, Roy Harper (who sang vocals on Have a Cigar), Brian Humphries, Peter Jenner, Nick Kent, Aubrey Powell, Ronnie Rondell Jr. (who depicted the "burning man" on the original cover), Gerald Scarfe, and Storm Thorgerson.

The film is about 59 minutes long, with 25 minutes of additional interviews on the DVD/BD release. These also include footage of Roger Waters and David Gilmour performing some excerpts from the original songs; while Brian Humphries, the album's sound engineer, plays back the original sound tapes from Abbey Road Studios archives.

== Certifications ==
Certifications for Wish You Were Here
| Region | Certification | Certified units/sales |
|---|---|---|
| Australia (ARIA) | Gold | 7,500^{^} |
^{^} Shipments figures based on certification alone.
