= The End (1978 film) =

1978 black comedy-buddy film directed by Burt Reynolds

- Theatrical release poster
- Directed by: Burt Reynolds
- Written by: Jerry Belson
- Produced by: Lawrence Gordon
- Starring: Burt Reynolds; Dom DeLuise; Sally Field; Strother Martin; David Steinberg; Joanne Woodward; Norman Fell; Myrna Loy; Kristy McNichol; Pat O'Brien; Robby Benson; Carl Reiner
- Cinematography: Bobby Byrne
- Edited by: Donn Cambern
- Music by: Paul Williams
- Production company: Gordon-Reynolds Productions
- Distributed by: United Artists
- Release dates: May 7, 1978 (Premiere); May 10, 1978 (New York/LA)
- Running time: 100 minutes
- Country: United States
- Language: English
- Budget: $3 million
- Box office: $44.9 million

The End is a 1978 American black comedy film directed by and starring Burt Reynolds, written by Jerry Belson, and with music composed by Paul Williams. The film also stars Dom DeLuise along with Sally Field, Strother Martin, David Steinberg, Joanne Woodward, Norman Fell, Myrna Loy, Kristy McNichol, Pat O'Brien, Robby Benson and Carl Reiner.

Reynolds was quoted saying he "loved" the film. "Nobody wanted to do it. They allowed me to do The End if I did Hooper, which made a fortune for Warner Brothers. But The End eventually made $40 million."

== Plot ==
Wendell "Sonny" Lawson, an unscrupulous Los Angeles real estate promoter, learns that he has a fatal blood disease and has between three months and a year to live. After visiting a hospital ICU, he decides to die by suicide rather than endure the slow, painful death his doctor describes. He takes the time to meet with several friends and family members for the last time, including his daughter Julie and ex-wife Jessica, hiding his prognosis and his intentions from most of them. However, he does reveal his plan to Marty, his best friend and lawyer.

Sonny takes an overdose of sleeping pills but wakes up in a mental institution, in which he has been committed by Marty and Jessica. He befriends fellow patient, Marlon Borunki, a paranoid schizophrenic with dissociative identity disorder who has been committed for murdering his father in a fit of rage. Marlon is sympathetic to Sonny's continuing desire to die, and so helps him in various unsuccessful attempts, including jumping from a tower, crushing his head in the hospital bed, and being hanged. Sonny meets Dr. Maneet, a psychiatrist with a fatal diagnosis himself, who briefly reawakens Sonny's desire to live and find meaning in the time he has left; unfortunately, immediately after this breakthrough, Dr. Maneet dies in Sonny's arms.

Sonny and Marlon break out of the institution, and Sonny retrieves a gun from his girlfriend's house, intending to shoot himself. This too fails when the gun jams, so he drives to the coast and swims into the sea to drown. He "hears" Jessica and Julie talking about him at his funeral and realises he doesn't want to die, and miraculously swims back to land, promising God a share of his future profits if he lives; first 50%, then 30%, and finally, when it is clear he will make it back to shore, 10%.

Marlon, having found Sonny's gun, fires at him repeatedly, trying to fulfil his wish to die; he misses every time, and Sonny tries to convince him that he now wants to live. Marlon seems to understand, but then pulls a knife and chases Sonny down the beach, and Sonny renews his higher offer to God if he can escape.

== Cast ==
- Burt Reynolds as Wendell Sonny Lawson
- Dom DeLuise as Marlon Borunki
- Sally Field as Mary Ellen
- Strother Martin as Dr. Waldo Kling
- David Steinberg as Marty Lieberman
- Joanne Woodward as Jessica Lawson
- Norman Fell as Dr. Samuel Krugman
- Myrna Loy as Maureen Lawson
- Kristy McNichol as Julie Lawson
- Pat O'Brien as Ben Lawson
- Robby Benson as Father Dave Benson
- Carl Reiner as Dr. James Maneet
- Louise LeTourneau as Receptionist
- Bill Ewing as Hearse Driver
- Robert Rothwell as Limousine Driver
- James Best as Pacemaker Patient
- Frank McRae as Male Nurse
- Harry Caesar as Hospital Orderly
- Queenie Smith as Old Lady in Car
- Jock Mahoney as Old Man

== Production ==
Belson wrote the script in 1971 and it was under development at Columbia Pictures before producer Lawrence Gordon took it on. He sat on the script for five years until Burt Reynolds became attached and the film went into development at United Artists. Reynolds said he wanted to do the film because "I'd read an awful lot of comedies and none struck me as especially funny, according to my strange sense of comedy. There are a lot of minefields in this topic, death, and that's why everybody turned it down over the last five years."

He elaborated: "You can deal with death on a totally Mel Brooks level, but when you try to make a film with parts that are really real amidst the comedy, that's a big risk. What's really funny is what's real. When I was very sick, if I told you what I did, it was funny."

The studio was reluctant to finance The End. They were unhappy with Reynolds wearing a beard and wanted his profession to be a stock car racer. But Reynolds insisted.

Reynolds said "Some people think the guy in The End is as far away from me as anybody could be, but people who really know me realize that it's very close to what I am. The guy crying in the doctor's office, that's me. This guy is totally nude."

The original ending had Marlon kill Sonny. Reynolds said he changed it "because I thought it had to have some hope."

Reynolds said, "If I do anything similar to other directors, it's very much like European directors in the sense that in The End I crowd the actors with the camera. I do that because he's suffocating, so I used an inordinate number of close-ups, using close-ups the way others would use masters. Wertmüller did it a lot in Seven Beauties. Mr. Klein had a lot of tight close-ups."

== Songs ==
- "Another Fine Mess"
  - Music and lyrics by Paul Williams
  - Sung by Glen Campbell

== Release and reception ==
The End had its world premiere as the closing night film at Filmex in Los Angeles on May 7, 1978, and was released in New York City and Los Angeles on May 10.

The mixture of comedy with the controversial topic of suicide was not what critics were expecting from a Burt Reynolds film, and was poorly received. New York Times critic Vincent Canby gave the film a negative review, placing most of the blame on Burt Reynolds. He felt the film was disjointed, writing, "this is half-heartedly satiric material that's been directed by Mr. Reynolds as if it were broad, knock-about comedy sometimes and, at other times, as if it were meant to evoke pathos, which it never does." Art Murphy at Variety magazine was even more critical of the film, calling it "a tasteless and overripe comedy that disintegrates very early into hysterical, undisciplined hamming." The magazine's review was highly critical towards the supporting cast, calling Dom DeLuise "absolutely dreadful," Sally Field "phoning in a kooky-pretty role," and Joanne Woodward, "poorly utilized."

As of April 2025, The End held a 56% rating on Rotten Tomatoes based on 18 reviews. Metacritic, which uses a weighted average, assigned the film a score of 46 out of 100, based on 8 critics, indicating "mixed or average" reviews.

It was, however, well enough received by audiences and was a huge box office success. After two weeks in New York and L.A., it expanded to 466 theaters in the U.S. and Canada and grossed $4,571,980 in its first six days of nationwide release and went on to make nearly $45,000,000 in the U.S. and Canada alone.
