= Renegades (1989 film) =

1989 film by Jack Sholder

- Theatrical release poster
- Directed by: Jack Sholder
- Written by: David Rich
- Produced by: David Madden
- Starring: Kiefer Sutherland; Lou Diamond Phillips; Rob Knepper; Bill Smitrovich; Jami Gertz
- Cinematography: Phil Méheux
- Edited by: Caroline Biggerstaff
- Music by: Michael Kamen
- Production companies: Morgan Creek Productions; Interscope Communications
- Distributed by: Universal Pictures (United States); J&M Entertainment (international)
- Release date: June 2, 1989
- Running time: 106 minutes
- Language: English
- Budget: $16 million
- Box office: $20 million

Renegades is a 1989 American action crime film directed by Jack Sholder and starring Kiefer Sutherland, Lou Diamond Phillips and Jami Gertz. It was released on June 2, 1989, by Universal Pictures.

== Plot ==
Buster McHenry works as an undercover agent for the Philadelphia Police Department. He is attempting to flush out a corrupt officer, but his investigation hits two complications. The first occurs when he is arrested while trying to stop a carjacking; after having distracted the suspect with a beer bottle, he assaults an officer. The second occurs when he participates in a robbery of a jewelry store to retrieve $6 million in diamonds. During the course of fleeing the crime scene, an ancient Indian spear is stolen from an auction house and Buster is wounded.

Marino, a crime boss who led the robbery, thinks that the spear might be worth something to his associates. Hank Storm, a young Indian, is now after the spear and Buster is after his criminal cohorts. Hank rescues Buster and nurses him back to health. Hank blames Buster for what happened at the auction house, but Buster tells him that he was doing his job. Marino discovers where Buster has been hiding out. With Hank's help, both of them escape.

Both of them are outsiders in their own way, but now they have the same target. They despise each other at first, but learn to set aside their differences and work together. Meanwhile, Marino and his men visit Hank's father, whom they shoot and kill when he refuses to cooperate in locating his son.

After interrogating some of Marino's associates, they now realize that some of Buster's partners want him dead because he knows too much, and that there is corruption in the police force. Buster comes to conclude that his partners sold him out to Marino. Buster and Hank infiltrate and destroy Marino's hideout. They start killing many of Marino's men, as well as the corrupt policemen. Buster kills Marino by throwing a spear into his chest as he was about to kill Hank. A month later, Hank takes a job as a tour guide in Texas, while Buster visits him and tells him that he is again a policeman, hoping it will turn his life around.

Buster thanks Hank for showing him the error of his ways. They shake hands as both men realize that they have better futures. Hank promises Buster that he will visit him sometime soon. Buster drives off as Hank waves goodbye.

== Cast ==
- Kiefer Sutherland as Detective Buster McHenry
- Lou Diamond Phillips as Hank Storm
- Robert Knepper as Bobby Marino
- Bill Smitrovich as Detective Michael Finch
- Jami Gertz as Barbara
- Clark Johnson as J.J.
- Jack Blum as Keith Weinstock
- Peter MacNeill as Detective Denny Ransom
- Tom Butler as Detective Geddles
- Paul Butler as Captain Blaloch
- Floyd 'Red Crow' Westerman as Red Crow Storm, Hank Storm's Father
- Gary Farmer as George Storm, Hank's Brother
- Janelle Hutchinson as Annette
- John Di Benedetto as Corso
- Joseph Griffin as Matt
- Kyra Harper as Nema
- Paul Hill as Nema's Oldest Son
- Kyle Anderson as Nema's Youngest Son
- Big Yank as Dealer
- Robert LaSardo as Skinhead
- Joseph Hieu as Gang Leader
- Von Flores as Gangbanger #1
- Jacqueline Samuda as Woman Cop
- Real Andrews as Man Cop
- Grandfather Semu Haute as Lakota Chief (uncredited)

== Production ==
Director Jack Sholder wanted to eclipse the car chase from his previous film The Hidden. He asked stunt coordinator Mickey Gilbert what could be shown in a car chase that he had not been previously done. Gilbert devised with two stunts: the car driving straight through the office and obliterating it, and the car driving up a ramp into a semi truck and exiting through the other end. The car chase originally lasted nine minutes, but Sholder felt it was too long, so he trimmed it to seven minutes in length.

== Reception ==
The film received negative reviews from critics. It currently has a 33% rating on Rotten Tomatoes based on six reviews, with an average rating of 4.1/10. Audiences polled by CinemaScore gave the film an average grade of "B" on an A+ to F scale. The film grossed $3,075,030 on its first weekend, peaking at #5 at the American box office, behind Indiana Jones and the Last Crusade and the newcomer No Holds Barred. The film grossed a total of $9 million in the U.S. and Canada and $20 million worldwide.
