= Robert K. Ottum =

American novelist (1925–1986)

- Born: 9 June 1925; Duluth, Minnesota, U.S.
- Died: 11 June 1986 (aged 61); Salt Lake City, Utah, U.S.
- Occupations: Journalist, author
- Spouse: Joyce M. Ottum
- Writing career
- Language: English
- Genres: Sports journalism, science fiction, thrillers

Robert Keith Ottum, known as Robert K. Ottum and Bob Ottum (June 9, 1925 – June 11, 1986) was an American sports journalist specializing in motorsport and writer of science fiction and thrillers. He was editor in chief of Sports Illustrated.

== Sports writing ==
Ottum was born in Duluth, Minnesota, to Charles Reynolds and Lee R. Lafay. He joined the Navy in his teens and served on an attack transport in the Pacific during World War II. Shortly after the war, he lived in San Francisco. He joined Utah newspaper The Salt Lake Tribune in 1946 despite a lack of journalistic experience and rose to executive news editor. In 1964, Ottum quit the Tribune and joined Sports Illustrated, a job for which he moved to New York City. While he wrote about motorsport in particular, he reported on a wide range of sports and covered five Winter Olympics and Summer Olympics.

With surfer Phil Edwards, Ottum wrote You Should Have Been Here an Hour Ago: The Stoked Side of Surfing or How to Hang Ten Through Life and Stay Happy (1967). This biography of Edwards is noted by the Encyclopedia of Surfing (2005) to be "surfing's first full-length biography".

In July 1968, and again a few months later, auto racer Mickey Thompson and his crew took three recently built 1969 Ford Mustang Mach 1s to the Bonneville Salt Flats in Utah and broke a total of 295 FIA speed and endurance records. Ottum was one of the drivers; his article about the experience was published in the August 19, 1968, issue of Sports Illustrated under the title "Old Marshmallow Foot" (a reference to the fact that Ottum had "never driven a car in anger").

Ottum retired from the magazine's staff of senior writers at the end of 1985. He wrote a Sunday column on a miscellany of subjects for The Salt Lake Tribune after 1984. Through his column he set up a campaign to help the homeless that raised thousands of dollars.

== Fiction writing ==
Ottum wrote five novels and two works of non-fiction. Short fiction of his appeared in magazines including Science Fiction Quarterly, Future Science Fiction, The Magazine of Fantasy & Science Fiction and Fantastic Universe. His first such offering was the story "She called me Frankie", published in Science Fiction Quarterly in May 1953.

Ottum's 1972 comic novel All Right, Everybody Off the Planet! is a story of aliens who send a spy to earth and try to stage-manage an impressive first contact although they are ignorant of human relationships. It was published in France as Pardon, vous n'avez pas vu ma planète ? (1973) and was adapted twice for French television under the title Bing: as a television film in 1986 and as a television series in 1991.

Stand on It (1973), written jointly with auto racer, writer and actor William Neely, is a fictional autobiography of hard-living, hard-driving racer "Stroker Ace", based loosely on stock car racer Curtis Turner. The novel was adapted as the action comedy Stroker Ace (1983) starring Burt Reynolds.

The novels The Tuesday Blade (1976) and See the Kid Run (1978) are noir slashers set in crime-infested New York City. The latter novel inspired the British band Break Down to write a song by the same name, released as a single in 1982.

Ottum died of cancer at his home in Salt Lake City at the age of 61.

== Assessment ==
Ottum's sports writing was and continues to be highly regarded. Donald J. Barr, writing in Sports Illustrated in 1985, opined that "No SI writer has spoken with a more distinctive—or entertaining—voice over the past 21 years than Bob Ottum". In its entry on You Should Have Been Here an Hour Ago, the 1967 biography of surfer Phil Edwards co-written by Edwards and Ottum, the Encyclopedia of Surfing (2005) states that it is "thought by many to be the finest book written on surfing".

Commenting on Ottum's 1968 Sports Illustrated article "Old Marshmallow Foot" about racing on the Salt Flats in Utah, Brian Lohnes—writing on BangShift.com in 2019—observed: "The humor, humility, and fun displayed here along with the legit reporting of events is something that goes into different realms than today's automotive journalism does."

Ottum's works of fiction were variously received. Reviewing the comic novel All Right, Everybody Off the Planet! (1972) in the University of Scranton publication Best Sellers: The Semi-Monthly Book Review, Charles J. Keffer wrote: "The entire enterprise is very ingeniously developed and written and would be well worth while as an evening's entertainment." Kirkus Reviews concluded that "A lot of the very funny potential goes up in marsh gas, but then this alien world comes from the Time-Life building."

Discussing See the Kid Run (1978), Kirkus Reviews denounced a "phony sentimental streak running, incongruously through this latest formless festival of pillage and gore from the author of The Tuesday Blade".

== Published works ==
- You Should Have Been Here an Hour Ago, The Stoked Side of Surfing or How to Hang Ten Through Life and Stay Happy (1967), by Phil Edwards with Bob Ottum.
- All Right, Everybody Off the Planet! (1972). ISBN 0394469143.
- Ace, Stroker (1973). Stand on It (1973). ISBN 0316668702.
- Ottum, Bob (1976). The Tuesday Blade (1976). ISBN 067122400X.
- Ottum, Bob (1978). See the Kid Run (1978). ISBN 0-671-23095-6.
