= Smokey and the Bandit Part 3 =

1983 film by Dick Lowry

- Theatrical release poster
- Directed by: Dick Lowry
- Written by: Stuart Birnbaum; David Dashev
- Based on: Characters by: Hal Needham; Robert L. Levy
- Produced by: Mort Engelberg
- Starring: Jackie Gleason; Paul Williams; Pat McCormick; Jerry Reed
- Cinematography: James Pergola
- Edited by: David E. Blewitt; Byron "Buzz" Brandt; Christopher Greenbury
- Music by: Larry Cansler
- Distributed by: Universal Pictures
- Release date: August 12, 1983
- Running time: 85 minutes (Theatrical Cut); 96 minutes (Lowry Cut)
- Language: English
- Budget: $9 million
- Box office: $7 million

Smokey and the Bandit Part 3 (also known as Smokey and the Bandit III) is a 1983 American action comedy film and serves as a sequel to Smokey and the Bandit II (1980). The film is the third installment in the Smokey and the Bandit franchise and the final film of the Smokey and the Bandit trilogy, starring Jackie Gleason, Jerry Reed, Paul Williams, Pat McCormick, Mike Henry and Colleen Camp. The film also includes a cameo near the end by the original Bandit, Burt Reynolds.

With one of the main titular characters missing, the plot of the film revolves instead around Sheriff Buford T. Justice ("Smokey"), with the presence of the Bandit merely being suggested through him being impersonated by Cledus Snow ("Snowman"). Smokey and the Bandit Part 3 was panned by critics and was a financial failure, grossing only $7 million against a $9 million budget.

== Plot ==
Three years after the events of the second film, Big and Little Enos Burdette offer retiring Sheriff Buford T. Justice a wager, betting $250,000 against his badge on his ability to transport a large statue shark from Miami to Austin, Texas. Buford rejects the wager and retires, but after realizing retirement is not all it is cracked up to be, he reconsiders and accepts the Burdettes' wager. Buford picks up the shark and starts driving with his son, Junior.

Big and Little Enos set many traps, but after Buford dodges all of them, they decide to hire Cledus Snow, to disguise as the Bandit to intercept Buford. Cledus parks his semi truck at his house, puts on a disguise, leaves Fred with Freida for company, travels to Bo Darville's garage to get in the new black and gold Pontiac Trans Am (Grandson of Trigger), and sets off to get the shark.

Cledus picks up Dusty Trails, who quits her job at a used car dealership at the town's Autorama (similar to how Bo picks up Carrie from the first movie). Cledus catches up with Buford, steals the shark with his rope and Dusty greets Buford, causing him to think that the Bandit is back, thus beginning another hot pursuit. Another local officer, attempts to take charge of the situation. Both police cars are disabled in the chase.

Cledus and Dusty make their stop at the Gator Kicks Longneck Saloon where he tries to get a cheeseburger and gets into a fight with some bikers that kick him out, but eventually gains the upper hand and their respect. This allows Buford to catch up and another chase creates mass chaos in a local town. Cledus escapes when an 18-wheeler blocks the alleyway where he sped through. While trying to get the truck out, Buford's car (a Pontiac Bonneville) is towed as the police woman gave Buford a ticket, but he reverses the car and escapes. The police woman and the tow truck driver chases him, while Junior is spinning on the hook. As Buford keeps on going with the chase, he makes the tow truck ram the cars and tip over, throwing Junior into the ground, and quickly climbed up a palm tree as other cars crash into the pile-up.

Buford chases Cledus in the Mississippi Fairgrounds. Buford's car is thrown up on two side wheels by an incline, but he continues the pursuit on two wheels. That night, Cledus and Dusty stop at the hotel called the Come On Inn, where people are involved in an orgy. Buford sees the Trans Am parked there and searches for the shark, which he finds. Buford also thinks he finds Cledus in the sauna, but it turns out to be a muscular woman named Tina, who becomes infatuated with him.

The next day, one of Buford's tires is blown by the "Enos Devil Darts". Cledus retakes the shark. Buford pursues on the remaining two tires, first through a herd of cattle, then through parked boats, then a nudist camp, then through a field where the Burdettes set off explosions, one of which destroys the car except the engine, seat, and lights, the latter of which Junior is holding above his head.

Cledus deliberately slows down so Junior can retrieve the shark from the Trans Am, allowing Buford to successfully complete the bet. As Buford collects his money from Little Enos, he sees Cledus. Thinking he has been dealing with the real Bandit all along, he approaches him to arrest him. In doing so, he imagines Cledus as the real Bandit, who attempts to talk him out of arresting him before Junior reminds him of his retirement. Buford and the Bandit both separately come to the same conclusion that they need one other in order for their lives to have meaning, and Buford gives him a five-minute head start and, with Tina joining him, and mirroring the finale of the first film - he once again chases after Bandit in futility with Junior running behind as the end credits roll.

== Cast ==
- Jackie Gleason as Sheriff Buford T. Justice of Texas
- Jerry Reed as Cledus "The Snowman" Snow / "The Bandit"
- Paul Williams as Enos "Little Enos" Burdette
- Pat McCormick as Enos "Big Enos" Burdette
- Mike Henry as Junior Justice
- Colleen Camp as Dusty Trails
- Faith Minton as Tina
- Burt Reynolds as Bo "The Bandit" Darville
- Sharon Anderson as Police Woman
- Silvia Arana as Latin Woman
- Alan Berger as Hippie
- Ray Bouchard as Purvis R. Beethoven
- Connie Brighton as Girl #1
- Earl Houston Bullock as Flagman
- Ava Cadell as The Blonde
- Cathy Cahill as Mother Trucker
- David S. Cass Sr. as Local Tough Guy
- Leon Cheatom as Guide
- Candace Collins as French Maid
- Peter Conrad as Midget
- Janis Cummins as Nudist Female
- Jackie Davis as Blackman #1
- Dee Dee Deering as Mrs. Fernbush
- Al De Luca as Flower Vendor
- Raymond Forchion as Tar Worker
- Dick Lowry as Sand Dumper
- Sandy Mielke as Driving Instructor

== Production ==
The film was originally entitled Smokey IS the Bandit, and did not include Jerry Reed in the cast. Contemporary newspapers refer to original plans to feature Jackie Gleason as both "Smokey" and "the Bandit", and Reed's name does not appear in early promotional materials or newspaper accounts during the film's production. According to some accounts, Gleason was to play two roles: Sheriff Buford T. Justice and a different "Bandit". The original version was shot from October 1982 to January 1983. Reportedly test audiences reacted poorly, finding Gleason's two roles confusing, so the studio opted to do re-shoots in April 1983. The Bandit scenes were re-shot with Jerry Reed playing the role. Other accounts indicate that the title was more literal: that Gleason was to play only Sheriff Justice, but the character would also fill the role of "the Bandit", by taking the Burdette family's challenge (as Burt Reynolds' character Bo "The Bandit" Darville had done in the previous two films). In a teaser trailer for the film (billed as Smokey IS the Bandit), Gleason appears in character as Justice, explaining to the audience that to defeat the Bandit he would adopt the attributes of his prey, "becoming [my] own worst enemy". A publicity still of Gleason apparently shows him in costume as the Bandit.

For the first (and only) time in the franchise, the black Trans Am driven by Cledus/Bandit is the third generation version which would go onto greater fame in the TV series Knight Rider, and the model used is near identical to the base vehicle used for KITT. As in the previous films, Justice drives a Pontiac police car, in this case an '83 Bonneville.

== Soundtrack ==
Smokey and the Bandit Part 3: Music from the Original Motion Picture Soundtrack

Soundtrack album by various artists
- Released: 1983
- Genre: Soundtrack
- Length: 17:57
- Label: MCA Records
- Producers: John Stewart; Jerry Crutchfield; Larry Cansler

Smokey and the Bandit Part 3: Music from the Original Motion Picture Soundtrack was released on vinyl and cassette tape by MCA Records in 1983.

No.	Title	Writer(s)	Length
1.	"Ticket for the Wind" (John Stewart)	John Stewart	4:03
2.	"The Bandit Express" (Lee Greenwood)	Dick Feller, Don Schlitz	3:42
3.	"Buford T. Justice" (Ed Bruce)	Dick Feller, Don Schlitz	2:53
4.	"The Legend of the Bandit" (Lee Greenwood)	Sam Weedman	2:59
5.	"Dixie" (Larry Cansler)	Larry Cansler	2:25
6.	"Buford in Pursuit" (Larry Cansler)	Larry Cansler	1:55
Total length:			17:57

== Reception ==
Smokey and the Bandit Part 3 received uniformly negative reviews by critics and the film was regarded as the weakest of the three Smokey and the Bandit films in terms of both storyline and revenue. On Rotten Tomatoes, the film has an approval rating of 14% based on reviews from seven critics. On Metacritic, it has a score of 4/100 based on 5 critics, indicating "overwhelming dislike".

Janet Maslin of The New York Times gave the film a negative review, saying, "The already skimpy running time of Smokey and the Bandit, Part 3 is padded by an opening montage of earlier Smokey scenes, including shots of Burt Reynolds lounging in a zebra-print hammock. He is grinning, as well he might, because he has been able to sit out Part 3 altogether. What has he missed? An interminable car chase punctuated by dumb stunts and even dumber dialogue, plus the well-worth-missing sight of Paul Williams in a dress". Variety magazine staff wrote, "The sense of fun in that original is missing and the countless smashups and near-misses are orchestrated randomly".

Despite the enormous financial success of the original film (grossing over $300 million on a budget of less than $5 million), coupled with respectable (though significantly lower) numbers generated by the sequel, the third film grossed only about $7 million against the film's $9 million production budget.

== Standalone sequel series ==
The film was followed by a television series simply titled Bandit (1994), which stars Brian Bloom as the son of Bo Darville, and Brian Krause as Lynn.

The series – which had the involvement from Hal Needham, the director of the first two Smokey and the Bandit films – was produced by Universal Television for the Action Pack programming block.
