= Walter Hannemann =

American film editor (1912–2001)

- Born: Walter Adolph Hannemann; May 2, 1912; Atlanta, Georgia, U.S.
- Died: April 29, 2001 (aged 88); San Marcos, California, U.S.
- Occupation: Film editor
- Children: 2

Walter Adolph Hannemann (May 2, 1912 – April 29, 2001) was an American film editor. He was nominated for two Academy Awards in the category Best Film Editing for the films Two-Minute Warning and Smokey and the Bandit.

Hannemann died on April 29, 2001, of natural causes at his home in San Marcos, California, at the age of 88.

== Selected filmography ==
- Two-Minute Warning (1976; co-nominated with Eve Newman)
- Smokey and the Bandit (1977; co-nominated with Angelo Ross)
