= Smokey and the Bandit (franchise) =

- Directed by: Hal Needham (1–2); Dick Lowry (3)
- Based on: Characters by: Hal Needham; Robert L. Levy
- Produced by: Mort Engelberg (1 & 3); Robert L. Levy (1); Hank Moonjean (2)
- Starring: Burt Reynolds; Jerry Reed; Sally Field (1–2); Dom DeLuise (2); Colleen Camp (3); Jackie Gleason; Mike Henry; Paul Williams; Pat McCormick
- Production companies: Universal Pictures; Rastar (1-2)
- Distributed by: Universal Pictures
- Country: United States
- Language: English

Smokey and the Bandit is an action comedy franchise following the exploits of bootleggers Bo "Bandit" Darville (Burt Reynolds), Cledus "Snowman" Snow (Jerry Reed), and Texas county sheriff Buford T. Justice (Jackie Gleason). The franchise consists of three theatrical films and the 1994 television series.

Created by stuntman and director Hal Needham, the first film of the trilogy, Smokey and the Bandit, was the second-highest-grossing domestic film of 1977 in the United States and had significant cultural impact including adding to the 1970s CB radio fad and igniting the popularity of the Pontiac Trans Am car driven by the Bandit.

== Films ==
Film	U.S. release date	Director(s)	Producer(s)
Smokey and the Bandit	May 27, 1977	Hal Needham	Mort Engelberg and Robert L. Levy
Smokey and the Bandit II	August 15, 1980	Hal Needham	Hank Moonjean
Smokey and the Bandit Part 3	August 12, 1983	Dick Lowry	Mort Engelberg

=== Smokey and the Bandit (1977) ===
Smokey and the Bandit (1977) is an American action comedy film and stars Burt Reynolds, Sally Field, Jackie Gleason, Jerry Reed, Pat McCormick, Paul Williams and Mike Henry and was the directorial debut of stuntman Hal Needham.

The film follows Bo "Bandit" Darville (Reynolds) and Cledus "Snowman" Snow (Reed), two bootleggers attempting to illegally transport 400 cases of Coors beer from Texarkana to Atlanta. While the Snowman drives the truck carrying the beer, the Bandit drives a 1977 Pontiac Trans Am to distract law enforcement (called blocking) and keep the attention off the Snowman. During their run, they are pursued by Texas county sheriff Buford T. Justice (Gleason).

Smokey and the Bandit was the second-highest-grossing domestic film of 1977 in the United States.

=== Smokey and the Bandit II (1980) ===
Smokey and the Bandit II (1980) is an American action comedy film directed by Hal Needham, and starring Burt Reynolds, Sally Field, Jerry Reed, Jackie Gleason and Dom DeLuise. The film is the sequel to the 1977 film Smokey and the Bandit.

The plot centers on Bo "Bandit" Darville (Burt Reynolds) and Cledus "Snowman" Snow (Jerry Reed), transporting an elephant to the GOP National Convention, with Sheriff Buford T. Justice (Jackie Gleason) once again in hot pursuit.

Smokey and the Bandit II was the eighth-highest-grossing domestic film of 1980 in the United States.

=== Smokey and the Bandit Part 3 (1983) ===
Smokey and the Bandit Part 3 (1983) is an American action comedy film starring Jackie Gleason, Jerry Reed, Paul Williams, Pat McCormick, Mike Henry and Colleen Camp. The plot of the film revolves around Sheriff Buford T. Justice ("Smokey"), with the presence of the Bandit merely being suggested through him being impersonated by Cledus ("Snowman").

The third film – which had no involvement from either Hal Needham or Sally Field and contained only a short cameo appearance by Burt Reynolds – revolved entirely around Jackie Gleason's character, was panned by critics, and was a box office bomb, earning only $7 million against a $9 million budget.

== Television series ==
=== Bandit (1994) ===
A Smokey and the Bandit standalone sequel and reboot TV series aired in 1994 for Universal Television's Action Pack with actor Brian Bloom playing as the son of Bo "Bandit" Darville. The three original films introduced two generations of the Pontiac Trans Am and the Dodge Stealth in the TV series.

=== Smokey and the Bandit (TV series) ===
In October 2020, a Smokey and the Bandit TV series was revealed to be in development, with a pilot written by David Gordon Green and Brian Sides and also executive produced with his Rough House confederates Jody Hill, Danny McBride and Brandon James, as well as Seth MacFarlane and Erica Huggins of Fuzzy Door.

=== Sheriff Justice ===
Universal and Netflix partnered with two Missouri natives for a Smokey and the Bandit prequel TV series, and filming began on July 5, 2026. Starring Sean Bailey as Sheriff Buford T. Justice (originally played by Jackie Gleason), and Jason Bobbitt as Junior (originally played by Mike Henry).

== Documentary ==
The Bandit (2016) is a documentary film about the making of "Smokey and the Bandit" and working with director and stuntman Hal Needham. Featuring interviews with Burt Reynolds and the crew, the film explores the unique relationship between Reynolds and Needham. The film was directed by Jesse Moss.
