= Hooper (film) =

1978 film by Hal Needham

- Theatrical release poster
- Directed by: Hal Needham
- Screenplay by: Thomas Rickman; Bill Kerby
- Story by: Walt Green; Walter S. Herndon
- Produced by: Hank Moonjean
- Starring: Burt Reynolds; Jan-Michael Vincent; Sally Field; Brian Keith; Robert Klein
- Cinematography: Bobby Byrne
- Edited by: Donn Cambern
- Music by: Bill Justis
- Distributed by: Warner Bros. Pictures
- Release date: July 14, 1978
- Running time: 99 minutes
- Country: United States
- Language: English
- Budget: $6 million
- Box office: $78 million

Hooper is a 1978 American action comedy film directed by Hal Needham and starring Burt Reynolds, Sally Field, Jan-Michael Vincent, Brian Keith, Robert Klein, James Best and Adam West. The film serves as a tribute to stuntmen and stuntwomen in what was at one time an underrecognized profession. At the time of filming, Field and Reynolds were in a relationship, having met on the set of Smokey and the Bandit the previous year.

== Plot ==
Sonny Hooper is the stunt coordinator on the action film The Spy Who Laughed at Danger, directed by Roger Deal and starring Adam West. Sonny's antics and wisecracks are a trial for the egotistical director and his officious but cowardly assistant, Tony. Years of numerous "gags" and his use of alcohol and painkillers are beginning to take their toll. Sonny lives with his girlfriend Gwen Doyle, whose father Jocko is a retired stuntman.

Sonny is coerced by a friend into performing at a charity show, where he meets Delmore "Ski" Shidski, a newcomer who makes a spectacular entrance. They become friends after a barroom brawl, and Sonny invites Ski to work with him on the film. They begin a friendly rivalry in which the dangerous stunts escalate. After a freefall from a record 224 ft (68 m), Sonny quietly consults with his doctor, who warns him that one more bad fall could render him quadriplegic.

Roger decides to add a climactic earthquake with many explosions, fires and car crashes to the film's ending. One scene calls for Sonny and Ski to race through the carnage to a gorge, where the bridge explodes before they can cross it. Roger suggests they rappel down one side of the gorge and up the other to safety, but Ski proposes jumping a car over the gorge, and Hooper notes a rocket car could easily make the 325-foot (99 m) jump. Roger loves the idea, ignoring the warnings that Sonny and Ski might not survive the landing even if the car lands on its wheels. Max Berns, the movie's producer and a longtime friend of Sonny's, warns Roger that the film is already over budget and they can't afford the $100,000 Hooper wants to perform the rocket car jump. Roger tells Max he wants the rocket car ending and to make cuts elsewhere. Tony fails to talk Hooper's price down.

Jocko suffers a stroke, but denies the gravity of his condition. Seeing Jocko in the hospital motivates Sonny to promise Gwen he will quit the business after the film wraps. Sonny's assistant and best friend Cully reveals the rocket car stunt and Sonny's secret visit to his doctor to a horrified Gwen. Sonny tells Roger he is backing out of the gag, but Max convinces him to reconsider, as no qualified stuntman is available, or willing, to replace him and Ski can't do it alone. Even after Gwen threatens to leave him, Sonny feels obligated to do the stunt.

Sonny and Ski perform the first part of the gag perfectly. As they approach the demolished bridge, the rocket pressure is below the minimum needed to make the jump but they attempt it anyway. The rocket car clears the gorge, overshoots the prepared landing area and lands hard on the far side. Ski emerges from the car and Gwen tearfully pushes her way through the gathering crowd as the chief engineer extracts Sonny from the car. Sonny slowly comes out of a daze and takes Gwen in his arms.

As the crowd looks at the bridge lying in the river and the gorge the rocket car had jumped, Roger tries to apologize for all the grief he gave everyone during filming. Thinking his apology insincere, Sonny knocks Roger out with a single punch, and triumphantly walks off the set with Gwen, Ski, Cully and Jocko.

== Cast ==
- Burt Reynolds as Sonny Hooper
- Sally Field as Gwen Doyle
- Jan-Michael Vincent as Delmore "Ski" Shidski
- Brian Keith as Jocko Doyle
- Robert Klein as Roger Deal
- John Marley as Max Berns
- James Best as Cully
- Alfie Wise as Tony
- Adam West as Himself
- Terry Bradshaw as Brawler
- Christa Linder as Actress

== Production ==
The film was initially called The Stuntman and Burt Reynolds committed to the film early and inexpensively. Lamont Johnson was originally due to direct in 1975. However, the project was shelved in 1976 after the Motion Picture Association of America ruled in an arbitration suit filed by director Richard Rush that its title was too similar to his planned film The Stunt Man (1980). Reynolds also quit the project in order to focus on his next films Smokey and the Bandit (1977) and Semi-Tough (1977).

The project was reactivated in 1977 under the title Hollywood Stuntman with Hal Needham as director and with Lawrence Gordon joining later as executive producer. Reynolds, who had been interested in the film because he started his acting career as a stuntman, also rejoined the film in order to fulfill his contract with Warner Bros. Pictures. Principal photography on the film began on January 31, 1978, in Tuscaloosa, Alabama. However, in March 1978 Rush filed another MPAA appeal forcing Warner Bros. to change the title of the film to Hooper.

It was rumored that the Roger Deal character played in the film by Robert Klein was a send-up of Peter Bogdanovich, who had made At Long Last Love and Nickelodeon with Reynolds.

The "destruction of Los Angeles" sequence that concludes both The Spy Who Laughed at Danger and Hooper was filmed in the Tuscaloosa, Alabama area, with all but the final rocket car jump staged at the by-that-time-disused Northington General Hospital, a World War II military hospital near the University of Alabama. The huge stunt sequence was referred to by the crew as "Damnation Alley."

The rocket car jump took place on US Highway 78E between Sumiton, Alabama. and Graysville, Alabama over the Locust Fork River (Lat.33°42'17.84"N Long. 86°59'33.74"W). The bridge was in the process of being demolished due to damage from a traffic accident involving a fuel truck.

== "Blooper reel" credits ==
Hooper was also one of the first films to make use of the blooper reel credit roll. The technique showed a smaller screen of outtakes from the film to one side while the film's credits roll slowly up the other side. Needham refined this technique for later films such as Smokey and the Bandit II, Stroker Ace and the Cannonball Run films. In Hooper, the credit reel was mostly a montage of many of the stunts performed in the film itself, owing to the film's tribute to the stunt industry. This technique was later used in other films, including the animated A Bug's Life, and Toy Story 2, for which the bloopers were intentionally created, and in TV series including The Fresh Prince of Bel-Air and Home Improvement. Most of Jackie Chan's films also feature blooper reel credit rolls, due to his experience in The Cannonball Run.

== Reception ==
Hooper enjoyed success at the box office being one of the top ten films of 1978, but ultimately the film was deemed a letdown in comparison to Reynolds's Smokey and the Bandit, second only to Star Wars in box office gross the year before. Hooper opened in 97 theaters and grossed $1,049,831 in its opening week. It expanded to 454 theaters and grossed $4,614,456 the following week before expanding again to 849 theaters and grossing $9,437,484. After 70 days of release, Hooper had grossed $55 million. It was withdrawn from release by year end having earned Warners' rentals of $31.5 million. The film was reissued in May 1979 and earned Warners a further $3.4 million bringing its rental to $34.9 million and its gross to $78 million in the United States and Canada, nearly 40% less than the gross of Smokey in 1977 ($126 million). The film has a score of 57% on review aggregator Rotten Tomatoes based on 21 reviews.

Janet Maslin wrote in The New York Times, "Mr. Reynolds is one of the most effortlessly appealing movie stars around, but consolidating his following has always been a problem: There are fans who like to watch him tearing up the highway, and there are fans who enjoy his delightfully flippant self-mockery, with all the covert thoughtfulness it implies. This time, Mr. Reynolds has made a movie to please fans of all persuasions, and to please them a great deal." Variety wrote that the work of the four lead performers was "a delight" that "boosts an otherwise pedestrian story with lots of crashes and daredevil antics into a touching and likeable piece." Gene Siskel of the Chicago Tribune gave the film three stars out of four and wrote, "None of this makes very much sense. But sense is not the point in Reynolds-Needham films. Just thrills, spills, and Reynolds' leer. That's proving to be one of the most potent combinations in today's film industry."

Kevin Thomas of the Los Angeles Times praised the "excellent" script, "inspired " casting, and direction by Needham that "brings such affection and amiability to the film that its people seem real even when what they're doing is patently fake—not in their awesome stunts but rather in their off-hours shenanigans." David Ansen wrote in Newsweek, "'Hooper' doesn't dig very deep into its Hollywood subject, but it's a good example of decent, no-frills filmmaking that lets a surprising amount of feeling seep through the cracks of its all-action formula." Gary Arnold of The Washington Post called it "a rousing and sweet-tempered sentimental comedy" that "should finally secure Reynolds a preeminent position in the affections of contemporary moviegoers." Penelope Gilliatt of The New Yorker was less enthused, calling the film "trite" and containing "frolicsome humor that is not contagious."

Critics of the film included Pauline Kael who wrote that it was "half-cocked" and a "neo John-Wayneism" that from Reynolds "often seems like a tired reflex."

The film was nominated for the Academy Award for Best Sound (Robert Knudson, Robert Glass, Don MacDougall and Jack Solomon) at the 51st Academy Awards.
