= Angelo Ross =

American film editor and sound engineer (1911–1989)

- Born: March 12, 1911
- Died: September 23, 1989 (aged 78); Hollywood, Florida, U.S.
- Occupation(s): Film editor, sound engineer
- Spouse: Isabella Ross
- Children: 1

Angelo Ross (March 12, 1911 – September 23, 1989) was an American film editor and sound engineer. He was nominated for an Academy Award in the category Best Film Editing for the film Smokey and the Bandit.

Ross died on September 23, 1989, in Hollywood, Florida, at the age of 78.

== Selected filmography ==
- Smokey and the Bandit (1977; co-nominated with Walter Hannemann)
