= Pecos Promenade =

Single by Tanya Tucker

from the album Smokey and the Bandit II (Original Soundtrack)
- B-side: "The King of Country Music"
- Released: August 1980
- Recorded: May 1980
- Genre: Country pop
- Length: 2:27
- Label: MCA
- Songwriter(s): Larry Collins; Snuff Garrett; Sandy Pinkard
- Producer(s): Snuff Garrett

Tanya Tucker singles chronology
"Better Late Than Never" (1980)	"Pecos Promenade" (1980)	"Dream Lover" (1980)

"Pecos Promenade" is a song written by Larry Collins, Snuff Garrett and Sandy Pinkard, and recorded by American country music artist Tanya Tucker, featuring an uncredited guest vocal from Glen Campbell. It was released in August 1980 as the first single from the soundtrack of the original film Smokey and the Bandit II.

== Background and recording ==
Tanya Tucker first reached country music stardom in 1972 at age 13 with the top ten single "Delta Dawn". She followed it with a string of number one singles through the decade, including "What's Your Mama's Name", "Blood Red and Goin' Down". She also had a series of top ten singles, which continued after switching to MCA Records in the mid seventies. After crossing over into country rock with 1978's TNT, her commercial appear began to wane. She only had two hit singles in 1980. One of these recordings was the track "Pecos Promenade", which Tucker had cut for the soundtrack of the film, Smokey and the Bandit II. The song was written by Larry Collins, Snuff Garrett and Sandy Pinkard. The song was recorded in March 1980 in Nashville, Tennessee in sessions produced by Snuff Garrett.

== Release and chart performance ==
"Pecos Promenade" appeared on the soundtrack of Smokey and the Bandit II in 1980. The song appeared as a single release by MCA in August 1980. It spent a total of 14 weeks on the American Billboard Hot Country Songs, climbing to the number ten position by November 1980. It was even more commercially-successful on the Canadian RPM Country chart, peaking at number seven around the same time.

== Track listing ==
7" vinyl single

- "Pecos Promenade" – 2:27
- "The King of Country Music" – 2:31

== Chart performance ==
Chart (1980)	Peak position
Canada Country Singles (RPM)	7
US Hot Country Songs (Billboard)	10
