= Mickey Gilbert =

American stuntman (1936–2024)

- Born: Roderick Michael Gilbert; April 17, 1936; Los Angeles, California, U.S.
- Died: February 5, 2024 (aged 87); Camarillo, California, U.S.
- Occupations: Actor, stuntman, rodeo performer
- Spouse: Yvonne Yrigoyen (m. 1962)
- Children: 3

Roderick Michael Gilbert (April 17, 1936 – February 5, 2024) was an American actor, stuntman and rodeo performer.

== Early life and career ==
Roderick Michael Gilbert was born in Los Angeles, California on April 17, 1936.

Gilbert was Robert Redford's stuntman in films, from Butch Cassidy and the Sundance Kid (1969) through The Old Man & the Gun (2018). In the trailer for The Old Man & the Gun, Redford says that he and Gilbert "were in the same class in the same high school in the San Fernando Valley, and then many, many years later, he showed up in my life again as the stunt double in Butch Cassidy, so from that point on he's been in all my films since."

Some of Gilbert's best known stunt roles are the leap off a cliff into water as Redford's Sundance Kid in Butch Cassidy and the Sundance Kid; jumping from a moving train to a signal for Gene Wilder in Silver Streak; rolling down a hill while mounted on a horse in The Return of a Man Called Horse; and leaping on horseback off a cliff into water in The Frisco Kid. Gilbert also appeared as a horse rider stunt performer in the 1980 TV movie Stunts Unlimited.

Later in his career he worked as a stunt coordinator and second unit director.

Gilbert portrayed the Ripper in the first episode of Kolchak: The Night Stalker.

== Personal life and death ==
Gilbert married Yvonne Yrigoyen, whose father was also a stunt performer, in 1962. They had three sons, all of whom are also stunt performers, as are their five grandsons. He died at his home in Camarillo, California, on February 5, 2024, at the age of 87.

== Filmography ==
=== Second unit director/stunts ===
Year	Title	Stunts	Second unit director	Director
1969	The Wild Bunch	Yes	No	Sam Peckinpah
1969	Butch Cassidy and the Sundance Kid	Yes	No	George Roy Hill
1970	Beneath the Planet of the Apes	Yes	No	Ted Post
1971	Sometimes a Great Notion	Yes	No	Paul Newman
1972	Joe Kidd	Yes	No	John Sturges
1974	Blazing Saddles	Yes	No	Mel Brooks
1976	The Return of a Man Called Horse	Yes	No	Irvin Kershner
1978	Every Which Way But Loose	Yes	No	James Fargo
1979	The Frisco Kid	Yes	No	Robert Aldrich
1980	The Blues Brothers	Yes	No	John Landis
1981	Honky Tonk Freeway	Yes	No	John Schlesinger
1983	Fast Times at Ridgemont High	Yes	No	Amy Heckerling
1986	Eye of the Tiger	Yes	No	Richard C. Sarafian
1986	The Golden Child	Yes	No	Michael Ritchie
1987	Big Shots	Yes	No	Robert Mandel
1988	Above the Law	Yes	Yes	Andrew Davis
1989	Renegades	Yes	Yes	Jack Sholder
1990	Problem Child	Yes	Yes	Dennis Dugan
1990	Young Guns II	Yes	Yes	Geoff Murphy
1991	City Slickers	Yes	Yes	Ron Underwood
1992	The Last of the Mohicans	Yes	Yes	Michael Mann
1992	Freejack	Yes	Yes	Geoff Murphy
1993	Ghost in the Machine	Yes	Yes	Rachel Talalay
1994	Monkey Trouble	Yes	No	Franco Amurri
1994	When a Man Loves a Woman	Yes	Yes	Luis Mandoki
1994	City Slickers II: The Legend of Curly's Gold	Yes	Yes	Paul Weiland
1994	Wes Craven's New Nightmare	Yes	Yes	Wes Craven
1995	Forget Paris	Yes	Yes	Billy Crystal
1995	Apollo 13	Yes	No	Ron Howard
1995	Waterworld	No	Yes	Kevin Reynolds
1995	The Amazing Panda Adventure	Yes	Yes	Christopher Cain
1996	Spy Hard	Yes	No	Rick Friedberg
1996	A Time to Kill	Yes	No	Joel Schumacher
1996	The Nutty Professor	Yes	No	Tom Shadyac
1997	Liar Liar	Yes	Yes	Tom Shadyac
1997	Metro	Yes	Yes	Thomas Carter
1997	Gone Fishin'	Yes	Yes	Christopher Cain
1998	Simon Birch	No	Yes	Mark Steven Johnson
1998	The Horse Whisperer	Yes	Yes	Robert Redford
1998	Meet the Deedles	No	Yes	Steve Boyum
1999	Mystery Men	Yes	No	Kinka Usher
2000	Nutty Professor II: The Klumps	Yes	Yes	Peter Segal
2001	Rat Race	No	Yes	Jerry Zucker
2002	Dragonfly	Yes	Yes	Tom Shadyac
2003	National Security	Yes	Yes	Dennis Dugan
2003	Bruce Almighty	Yes	Yes	Tom Shadyac
2003	Elf	No	Yes	Jon Favreau
2007	Evan Almighty	No	Yes	Tom Shadyac
2008	Terminator: The Sarah Connor Chronicles	Yes	Yes	Various; television series
2014	Need for Speed	Yes	No	Scott Waugh

=== As stunt double ===
Year	Title	Actor
1969	Butch Cassidy and the Sundance Kid	Robert Redford
1969	Tell Them Willie Boy Is Here	Robert Redford
1974	Blazing Saddles	Gene Wilder
1976	Silver Streak	Gene Wilder
1979	The Electric Horseman	Robert Redford
2018	The Old Man & the Gun	Robert Redford
