= Ronnie Rondell Jr. =

American actor and stuntman (1937–2025)

- Rondell (right) on the cover of Pink Floyd's 1975 album Wish You Were Here, shaking hands with Danny Rogers
- Born: Ronald Reid Rondell Jr. February 10, 1937; Hollywood, California, U.S.
- Died: August 12, 2025 (aged 88); Osage Beach, Missouri, U.S.
- Education: North Hollywood High School
- Occupations: Actor; director; stuntman; stunt coordinator
- Spouse: Mary Rondell
- Children: 2 (Note: One deceased)

Ronald Reid Rondell Jr. (February 10, 1937 – August 12, 2025) was an American actor, director, stuntman, and stunt coordinator known for his work in numerous television shows and more than 100 feature films, including How the West Was Won (1962), Blazing Saddles (1974), Lethal Weapon (1987), and The Crow (1994), as well as appearing on the cover of the Pink Floyd album Wish You Were Here.

In 2004, Rondell was honored for lifetime achievement at the Taurus World Stunt Awards. He was also inducted into the Hollywood Stuntmen's Hall of Fame.

== Early life ==
Born in Hollywood, California, on February 10, 1937, Ronald Reid Rondell Jr. was the son of Ronald Salvatore “Ronnie” Rondell and Ruth Durham Rondell. His father, born in Naples, Italy, acted in silent films and later served as an assistant film director for TV and film. His mother was employed as a motion picture secretary when she married Rondell Sr. in 1937. As a boy, Rondell Jr. often accompanied his father to movie sets, where he was eventually cast in Ma and Pa Kettle at the Fair in 1952. As a teenager, he attended North Hollywood High School, where he participated in gymnastics and diving, before enlisting in the Navy.

== Career ==
After serving as a Navy diver in the late 1950s, Rondell dabbled as a film extra before branching out into stunt work, eventually serving as a stunt double for several TV actors, including David Janssen, Robert Horton and Doug McClure. He specialized in aerial stunts, including falling from a 100-foot pole in the 1963 film Kings of the Sun and fiery vehicle crashes, including driving an exploding car in Ice Station Zebra. In 1970, Rondell co-founded Stunts Unlimited, an organization of top-rated stunt performers, with fellow daredevils Hal Needham and Glenn Wilder.

Rondell was photographed by Aubrey Powell of the design studio Hipgnosis for the cover of the Pink Floyd 1975 album Wish You Were Here, for which he was set on fire while shaking hands with fellow stuntman Danny Rogers. According to Powell, Rondell refused to do the stunt at first, saying that it was more dangerous standing still than in an action scene. He was dressed in a fireproof suit covered by a business suit. His head was protected by a hood, underneath a similarly fireproof wig, and fire-resistant gel was applied to him. The photograph was taken at Warner Bros. Studios in California, known at the time as The Burbank Studios. While the first fourteen takes were successful, Rondell suffered minor burns when the wind changed direction on the fifteenth, singeing his moustache and losing an eyebrow. The two stuntmen changed positions, and the image was later reversed. He recounted the event in the 2012 documentary The Story of Wish You Were Here.

In 1985, Rondell's 22-year-old son, Reid Rondell, was killed in a helicopter crash near Los Angeles while working as a stunt double for actor Jan-Michael Vincent on the TV series Airwolf.

Rondell performed stunts for some of the top action films of the late 1980s and early 1990s, including Lethal Weapon, Thelma & Louise and Speed. During that period, he also directed his first and only action film, No Safe Haven, starring Wings Hauser, and served as a second unit director on such films as The Two Jakes, The Mighty Ducks and Captain Ron. In 2003, he came out of retirement to appear in a complex car chase scene in The Matrix Reloaded, teaming up with his son, Ronald A. Rondell, the film's stunt coordinator.

== Death ==
Rondell died on August 12, 2025, at the age of 88, at Arrowhead Senior Living, an assisted living facility, in Osage Beach, Missouri. He was survived by his wife Mary and son Ronald.
