= Paul Flaherty =

Paul Flaherty may refer to:

- Paul Flaherty (computer scientist) (1964–2006), American computer scientist
- Paul Flaherty (musician) (born 1948), American jazz saxophonist
