= Danny Rogers (stuntman) =

American actor and stuntman (1943–2021)

- Rogers (left) shaking hands with Ronnie Rondell Jr. who was set on fire for the cover of Pink Floyd's 1975 album Wish You Were Here.
- Born: 1943
- Died: March 2, 2021 (aged 78)
- Occupations: Actor, stuntman

Danny Rogers (1943 – March 2, 2021) was an American actor and stuntman. He was known for his stunt-performing work in the films Beverly Hills Cop (1984), RoboCop (1987), Die Hard 2 (1990), Star Trek: First Contact (1996), Titanic (1997) and Pearl Harbor (2001), as well as for appearing on the cover of the Pink Floyd 1975 album Wish You Were Here, shaking hands with Ronnie Rondell Jr. who was set on fire.

As a stuntman, Rogers stunt doubled for actor Erik Estrada in the NBC crime drama television series CHiPs. He performed stunts in the Lethal Weapon franchise, and was a member of Stunts Unlimited, an organization of stunt performers.

Rogers died on March 2, 2021, at the age of 78.
