= Pat McCormick (actor) =

American actor (1927–2005)

- Born: June 30, 1927; Lakewood, Ohio, U.S.
- Died: July 29, 2005 (aged 78); Los Angeles, California, U.S.
- Education: Harvard University
- Occupations: Actor, comedy writer
- Years active: 1957–1997
- Height: 6 ft 7 in (2.01 m)
- Children: Ben McCormick

Pat McCormick (June 30, 1927 – July 29, 2005) was an American actor and comedy writer known for playing Big Enos Burdette in Smokey and the Bandit and its two sequels. He wrote for a number of performers such as Red Skelton, Phyllis Diller and Johnny Carson as well as for shows including Get Smart. McCormick had a distinctive appearance being 6'7" tall, weighing 250 lbs and having a walrus mustache.

== Early life ==
McCormick was born in Lakewood, Ohio, on June 30, 1927. He was a 1945 graduate of Rocky River High School.

== Career ==
McCormick was a high school athlete and served in the United States Army during World War II. He then enrolled at Harvard University as a freshman in the autumn of 1947 where he played basketball that year. He later dropped basketball to concentrate on track (hurdles). He dropped out of Harvard Law School for a career in advertising, but abandoned that career as well when he started writing jokes for television and standup comedians, including Jonathan Winters. Eventually, he became a writer for The Jack Paar Show. He wrote for Get Smart, The Danny Kaye Show and wrote and appeared on Candid Camera. He was also a member of the I've Got a Secret production staff in the early 1960s.

McCormick was both the announcer and straight man for Don Rickles on The Don Rickles Show in 1968. He was a regular on The New Bill Cosby Show in 1972. Behind the scenes, he was one of the lead writers on The Tonight Show writing many of its most well-known lines. He wrote the line "Due to today's earthquake, the God is Dead rally has been canceled." As part of a skit on a Jonathan Winters special McCormick, as a court jester, quipped to the regally-attired Winters "Is that a scepter in your pocket, or are you just happy to see me?" a quite risque line for early 1970s television.

His first screen performance was in The Shaggy D.A. in 1976. He played President Grover Cleveland in Robert Altman's Buffalo Bill and the Indians, or Sitting Bull's History Lesson in the same year. In 1977, he appeared in Smokey and the Bandit and appeared in the sequels in both 1980 and 1983, alongside Paul Williams as wealthy con men Big and Little Enos Burdette respectively. Pat appeared in the 1982 TV movie Rooster, which also starred Williams. In 1984, he co-starred in the George Carlin HBO TV show Apt. 2C of which only the pilot episode was ever made. He appeared as the Ghost of Christmas Present in a TV production in the Bill Murray comedy Scrooged in 1988, with his final appearance being in Ted & Venus.

On March 26, 1974, Johnny Carson's Tonight Show monologue was interrupted by McCormick streaking across the stage, done on a bet with the rest of the writing staff.

== Retirement and death ==
Living in Palm Springs, California, in 1996, McCormick retired in 1998 after being left partly paralyzed by a stroke. According to fellow writer Mark Evanier, McCormick was driving to the Beverly Hilton Hotel when he suffered a stroke and crashed his car into a concrete wall. The vehicle caught fire, but a woman named Danielle Villegas pulled him out and dragged him to safety before the car exploded. McCormick was admitted to the Motion Picture and Television Country House and Hospital in Woodland Hills, California, where he spent the remainder of his life. He died there seven years later, aged 78.

He was interred in Forest Lawn Memorial Park in Hollywood Hills. He was survived by a son, Ben, and two grandsons.

== Filmography ==
Year	Title	Role	Notes
1970	The Phynx	Father O'Hoolihan	
1975	If You Don't Stop It... You'll Go Blind	Himself - Awards Emcee	
1976	Buffalo Bill and the Indians, or Sitting Bull's History Lesson	Grover Cleveland	
1976	The Shaggy D.A.	Bartender	
1977	Smokey and the Bandit	Big Enos	
1977	Can I Do It... 'Til I Need Glasses?	Himself	
1978	A Wedding	Mackenzie Goddard	
1979	Hot Stuff	Man with Cigars	
1979	Scavenger Hunt	Carnival Barker	
1979	Mr. Horn	John Noble	
1980	Smokey and the Bandit II	Big Enos	
1980	The Gong Show Movie	Himself	
1981	History of the World, Part I	Plumbing Salesman - The Roman Empire	
1981	Under the Rainbow	Tiny	
1983	Smokey and the Bandit Part 3	Big Enos Burdette	
1983	Likely Stories, Vol. 3	Doctor	
1984	E. Nick: A Legend in His Own Mind	Sonny Patterson	
1985	Doin' Time	Fallis	
1985	Bombs Away	The Dispatcher	
1988	Rented Lips	Winky	
1988	Scrooged	Ghost of Christmas Present (TV)	
1988	Beverly Hills Vamp	Prof. Sommerset	
1990	Nerds of a Feather	Professor	
1990	Chinatown Connection	Flynn	
1991	Ted & Venus	Marcia's Elderly Boyfriend	
1992	Broadway Bound	Announcer	Voice
1992	Take It Back	Judge	
