= William Neely =

American writer

- Born: August 18, 1930; Jane Lew, West Virginia, U.S.
- Died: March 25, 2008 (aged 77); Wilmington, North Carolina, U.S.
- Education: West Virginia Wesleyan College (BA)

William Neely (August 18, 1930 – March 25, 2008) was an American writer, most famous for his book Stand on It by Stroker Ace.

== Early life and education ==
He was born in Jane Lew, West Virginia, the son of Walter and Madge Neely. After high school, Neely graduated West Virginia Wesleyan College, completing a Bachelor of Arts degree in English. He spent a year (1952–1953) pursuing graduate work at West Virginia University.

== Career ==
He served as sports editor of the Clarksburg Exponent and editor of the Hinton Daily News before returning to his alma mater as director of public relations. Neely went to work for the Goodyear Tire & Rubber Company, serving as manager of racing public relations from 1961 to 1966. In 1966, he left Goodyear to work as public relations manager of the central region for Humble Oil Company, a position he held until 1970. Neely retired in 1970 to concentrate on writing full-time. His first book, Spirit of America, was published in 1971.

Neely's best-known work was published in 1973, Stand on It by Stroker Ace, co-written by Bob Ottum. The novel, based in part on Neely's own experiences as a professional auto racer and on his experiences in the racing world with Goodyear and in part on NASCAR legend Curtis Turner, became quite popular for its gritty humor and its pull-no-punches depictions of the world of professional stock car racing. The novel was adapted into a 1983 film, Stroker Ace, starring Burt Reynolds and Loni Anderson. It also inspired a song, "Stroker's Theme", by Charlie Daniels.

Neely continued to write, particularly about the world of American stock car racing. Notable works include biographies of two of the sport's founding pioneers — Cale: The Hazardous Life and Times of America's Greatest Stock Car Driver (Cale Yarborough) and King Richard I (Richard Petty). He has also served as a contributor to both Playboy and Sports Illustrated. Neely was the first recipient of the West Virginia Writers Association "Summit Award", for a "lifetime of excellence as a professional writer."

He also starred in I Know What You Did Last Summer, Matlock, and The Night Flier.

== Personal life ==
He died on March 25, 2008, at the age of 77, in Wilmington, North Carolina following complications from heart surgery.

== Works ==
- Spirit of America
- Grand National
- A Closer Walk
- Country Gentleman
- Drag Racing
- Stand On It (with Bob Ottum)
- Cars to Remember
- Playboy Book of Racing, Driving and Rallying
- Daytona U.S.A.
- Official Chili Cookbook
- Roy Acuff's Nashville
- A.J.: The A. J. Foyt Story
- 505 Automobile Questions (You Were Afraid to Ask)
- Cale: The Hazardous Life and Times of America's Greatest Stock Car Driver
- King Richard I
- Alone in the Crowd
- Pilots
