= Stroker Ace =

1983 film by Hal Needham

- Theatrical release poster by Drew Struzan
- Directed by: Hal Needham
- Screenplay by: Hugh Wilson; Hal Needham
- Based on: Stand on It by: William Neely; Robert K. Ottum
- Produced by: Hank Moonjean
- Starring: Burt Reynolds; Ned Beatty; Jim Nabors; Parker Stevenson; Loni Anderson
- Cinematography: Nick McLean
- Edited by: William D. Gordean; Carl Kress
- Music by: Al Capps
- Production company: Yahi Productions
- Distributed by: Universal Pictures (North America theatrical and international home video); Warner Bros. (International theatrical and North American home video)
- Release date: July 1, 1983
- Running time: 94 minutes
- Country: United States
- Language: English
- Budget: $14 million
- Box office: $11.4 million

Stroker Ace is a 1983 American action comedy sport film directed by Hal Needham and starring Burt Reynolds as the eponymous Stroker Ace, a race car driver on the NASCAR circuit.

== Plot ==
Stroker Ace is a popular race car driver from Waycross, Georgia. A three-time champion in the NASCAR Winston Cup Series, he drives the #7 Ford Thunderbird. An all-or-nothing man, he wins if he does not crash. He is arrogant and pompous, with no regard for the business side of his racing team. He also has an on-track, season-long rivalry with ambitious young driver Aubrey James, who drives the #10 Four-Star Whiskey Buick Regal.

Angry with his racing sponsor, Jim Catty of Zenon Oil, Stroker dumps a load of wet concrete on him. Needing a new sponsor, he connects with fried chicken fast food chain mogul Clyde Torkle. Torkle, his chauffeur Arnold, and his newly appointed director of marketing and public relations Pembrook Feeny convince Stroker and Stroker's chief mechanic Lugs Harvey to sign with him.

Overlooking his contract by not reading its specifics, Stroker is obligated to be the commercial face for Torkle's Chicken Pit restaurants. (The slogan on Stroker's car reads: "The Fastest Chicken in the South.") The contract requires Stroker to make personal appearances while wearing a chicken costume—feet included. Realizing that he is locked into a bad deal, Stroker devises a plan with Lugs to escape it. Torkle realizes Stroker is scheming, and he allows Stroker's antics because he believes the sponsorship will make the Chicken Pit chain successful and famous.

A ladies' man, Stroker tries to seduce the beautiful Pembrook, who is a Sunday School teacher, does not drink, and is a virgin. She spurns his advances until he learns to respect her views. One night, after she gets drunk on champagne, he is able to remove her clothing, but nothing further happens.

Stroker wins races and is in the running for the season-ending championship. At the beginning of the final race, Torkle is offered a deal to sell his franchise for a huge profit—on the condition that he drops Stroker Ace as his driver. Torkle informs Stroker that if he wins the championship, Torkle won't take the offer, and Stroker has to sell chicken for the next two years. However, if Stroker loses, he is released from the contract.

During the race, Stroker feels conflicted. He drops back in the race in an effort to lose, but his ego prevents him. He quickly begins moving through the pack near the lead. A jack malfunction drops Stroker to 6th place as the race is nearing its end. Torkle concludes that Stroker has no chance to win. Eyeing the offer to sell as the deadline approaches, Torkle publicly announces that he is releasing Stroker immediately. He is unaware that Stroker is moving up through the field with a chance to win.

With the news that he is free from the contract, Stroker spectacularly wins the championship by flipping his car over as he crosses the finish line. Torkle then learns that the lucrative offer for his chicken franchise is a fake, cooked up by Stroker and his friends.

== Cast ==
- Burt Reynolds as Stroker Ace
- Ned Beatty as Clyde Torkle
- Jim Nabors as "Lugs" Harvey
- Parker Stevenson as Aubrey James
- Loni Anderson as Pembrook Feeny
- John Byner as "Doc" Seegle
- Frank O. Hill as "Dad" Seegle
- Cassandra Peterson as Elvira
- Bubba Smith as Arnold
- Warren Stevens as Jim Catty
- Alfie Wise as Charlie
- Cary Guffey as "Little Doc"
- Hunter Bruce as “Little Ace”
- Neil Bonnett as Himself
- Dale Earnhardt as Himself
- Harry Gant as Himself
- David Hobbs as Himself
- Terry Labonte as Himself
- Benny Parsons as Himself
- Kyle Petty as Himself
- Jerry Reed as Himself
- Tim Richmond as Himself
- Ricky Rudd as Himself
- Cale Yarborough as Himself
- Debbie Casperson as “Miss Leopard Fuel”
- Valerie Mitchell as “Miss Winston”
- Linda Vaughn as Herself
- Ken Squier as Himself
- Chris Economaki as Himself
- Bill Dollar as Himself
- Bill Connell as Himself
- Bill D. Brown as Radio Announcer

== Development ==
=== Novel ===
The film was adapted from the 1973 novel Stand on It, an autobiography of fictional driver Stroker Ace. The novel's joint authors, William Neely and Robert K. Ottum, based the book on actual events from the racing world but with their protagonist as the subject.

Robert Markus, a critic from the Chicago Tribune thought it "would do for stock car racing what... Semi-Tough did for football." "How this one found its way between hard covers is a mystery," wrote The New York Times.

=== Development ===
In 1977, Philip K. Feldman of First Artists Productions announced the company had bought the film rights to the novel to make a vehicle for Paul Newman. The following year, Mort Sahl was reportedly writing a script. Producer Walter Wood read the novel in 1978 and decided it would make a film. "I see it as an innocent, unpretentious comedy," said Wood. "I just wanted it to be a slice of fun." "It was never my intention to make a 'racing film'," he added. "I wanted a light comedy and that's what I got. I also wanted Hal Needham to direct and Burt Reynolds to star, and that's who I got. I knew that they'd know about the milieu and that they'd teach me. Those guys know the film's characters. Stroker is a composite."

Wood hired Hal Needham, who owned the NASCAR team Mach 1 Racing with Reynolds, to direct. Needham convinced Burt Reynolds to star. "I didn't actually ask Burt if he'd like to do it," said Needham, "but when I was in New York, I looked him up and told him how funny the script was. Two days later, he called and said, 'Needham, I want to do that film.' I hadn't been laying a trap for him. With his other commitments, I just didn't see how he could do it, but he pushed everything back to fit this one in."

Reynolds declined the role of astronaut Garrett Breedlove in Terms of Endearment to do this film. The role went to Jack Nicholson, who went on to win an Academy Award for Best Supporting Actor. Reynolds said he made this decision because "I felt I owed Hal more than I owed Jim" but that it was a turning point in his career from which he never recovered. Although car-themed films starring Reynolds had all previously been successes – including four made with Needham – Stroker Ace flopped. "That's where I lost them," he later said of his fans. The actor's fee was reportedly $5 million. Finance came from Warner Bros. and Universal, which both owed Reynolds a film – Universal got domestic theatrical, Warners other domestic and foreign.

The co-stars were Jim Nabors, Loni Anderson, Ned Beatty, Parker Stevenson, and Bubba Smith, with appearances by many NASCAR drivers, such as: Neil Bonnett, Dale Earnhardt, Harry Gant (whose car was part-owned by Hal Needham), Terry Labonte, Benny Parsons, Kyle Petty, Richard Petty, Tim Richmond, Ricky Rudd, Cale Yarborough, and announcers Ken Squier, David Hobbs, and Chris Economaki. The film was Anderson's starring feature debut (she had a small role in Vigilante Force in 1975), although she was already well known through her appearances in WKRP in Cincinnati and in TV movies.

== Production ==
Stroker Ace was filmed in North Carolina Georgia, and Alabama at Charlotte Motor Speedway, Talladega Superspeedway and the Atlanta Motor Speedway in Hampton, Georgia.

"We wanted to make a very broad comedy and I was worried that the drivers might resent it when they saw it," Wood said. "But they loved the simplicity of it, so I'm off the hook as far as the racing is concerned." "If you like Burt Reynolds, you'll like this movie," the producer added. "It was made for his fans which, for a producer, is not a bad reason to make a movie. I've never been involved in so commercial a movie. I'm not really that financially-oriented. I always go for the subject. I've lost a couple of fortunes doing that. Making Stroker Ace was like being a kid and running away with the circus. But that's not my lifestyle."

== Music ==
The music score was originally written by Ry Cooder, who said the film "when you're scoring a film about race cars, you're either playing Deep South funk or rockabilly" and that the movie "had enough racing action to make the rockabilly tempo work. I got this incredible rockabilly ensemble together, and the director just hated our music! He fired all of us right after he heard the tape." However, Cooder says he later used the music in his score for Streets of Fire.

The theme song "Stroker's Theme" was performed by Charlie Daniels.

== Reception ==
The film was a critical failure. It received five Golden Raspberry Award nominations, including Worst Picture, Worst Director, Worst Actress (Anderson), and Worst New Star (also for Anderson), winning one for Nabors as Worst Supporting Actor at the 4th Golden Raspberry Awards.

Vincent Canby of The New York Times called it "the must-miss movie of the summer. It's a witless retread of the earlier, far funnier road-movie collaborations of Mr. Needham and Mr. Reynolds, especially of their two Smokey and the Bandit movies." Roger Ebert gave the film 1.5 stars out of four, and wrote: "To call the movie a lightweight, bubble-headed summer entertainment is not criticism but simply description." Gene Siskel gave the film zero stars out of four, writing, "Reynolds' reputation as a serious actor is virtually destroyed with this miserable picture. He's sending only one message here: Fans, I'm in it for the money. What other explanation is possible?" Variety wrote that the Reynolds-Needham team were "just coasting in circles, trying to pick up whatever prize money might be attracted by their track record." Sheila Benson of the Los Angeles Times described Reynolds as "ambling through the movie as though it were a colossal in-joke, which, of course, it must be, since it isn't perceptibly funny to anyone outside Reynolds and Needham's immediate circle." Gary Arnold was somewhat more positive, calling it "a knuckleheaded but amiable summer trifle."

Wood wrote, "For the past five years, Burt has been No. 1 at the box office, and during that period, there has seldom been a good review of anything he's done." However the film was a major commercial disappointment.

On Rotten Tomatoes, the film has an 18% approval rating based on 17 reviews. On Metacritic, the film has a score of 30% based on reviews from five critics, indicating "generally unfavorable reviews".

== Legacy ==
The album White Pepper by Ween has a track called Stroker Ace, inspired by the movie.

The 2001 collaboration album by Mike Patton/Dan the Automater Music To Make Love To your Old Lady By by Lovage has a song called Stroker Acevideo.

For the 2019 Bojangles' Southern 500, Rick Ware Racing used Stroker Ace's No. 7 car as the basis for their No. 51 car's throwback paint scheme for driver B. J. McLeod.

Spire Motorsports used a Stroker Ace scheme for their No. 7 car driven by Corey LaJoie for the 2021 Hollywood Casino 400 as well as Justin Haley driving a replica throwback scheme honoring Aubrey James (Parker Stevenson)'s paint scheme.
