= Smokey and the Bandit II =

1980 film by Hal Needham

- Theatrical poster by Dan Gouzee
- Directed by: Hal Needham
- Screenplay by: Jerry Belson; Brock Yates
- Story by: Michael Kane
- Based on: Characters by: Hal Needham; Robert L. Levy
- Produced by: Hank Moonjean
- Starring: Burt Reynolds; Jackie Gleason; Jerry Reed; Dom DeLuise; Sally Field; Paul Williams; Pat McCormick
- Cinematography: Michael Butler
- Edited by: Donn Cambern; William D. Gordean
- Music by: Snuff Garrett
- Production company: Rastar
- Distributed by: Universal Pictures
- Release date: August 15, 1980
- Running time: 101 minutes
- Country: United States
- Language: English
- Budget: $17 million
- Box office: $66.1 million

Smokey and the Bandit II is a 1980 American action comedy film directed by Hal Needham, and starring Burt Reynolds, Jackie Gleason, Jerry Reed, Dom DeLuise, Sally Field, Mike Henry, Paul Williams and Pat McCormick. The film is the second installment in the Smokey and the Bandit franchise, the second film of the Smokey and the Bandit trilogy, and a sequel to Smokey and the Bandit (1977).

The film was originally released in the United Kingdom, New Zealand, Australia and several other, mainly Commonwealth, countries as Smokey and the Bandit Ride Again.

The plot centers on Bo "Bandit" Darville (Reynolds) and Cledus "Snowman" Snow (Reed), transporting an elephant to the GOP National Convention, with Sheriff Buford T. Justice (Gleason) once again in hot pursuit.

Smokey and the Bandit II received generally negative reviews from critics, but was a box office success, grossing $66.1 million on a $17 million budget, becoming the eighth-highest-grossing domestic film of 1980 in the United States.

== Plot ==
Three years after the events of the first film, Big Enos Burdette is in a mudslinging campaign against John Conn for Governor of Texas. After failing to get the outgoing governor's endorsement, Big Enos overhears him on the phone ordering a crate in Miami to be delivered in nine days to the Republican National Convention in Dallas. Burdette schemes to earn the governor's endorsement and have the crate delivered to the convention in his name and tracks down Cledus "Snowman" Snow and offers him and Bo "Bandit" Darville $200,000 to do the run. Cledus takes Big Enos and his son Little Enos to Bandit to make the offer in person, but Bandit has become a heavy drinker since breaking up with Carrie ("Frog") and is drunk when the Burdettes arrive and double the payoff to $400,000. Cledus accepts on Bandit's behalf, but adds that Big Enos should give them half in advance, to which they agree. Cledus is ecstatic, but Bandit begins to miss Carrie.

Cledus calls Carrie, who is back in Texarkana and again about to marry Junior Justice when Cledus calls offering her $50,000 to help out. She agrees and again becomes a runaway bride. Though she still has feelings for Bandit, when Carrie arrives, she initially intones she is only in it for the money, and she and Cledus work on getting Bandit off the booze and back into shape. She then trades in Junior's car for a new Trans Am (Son of Trigger). The group arrive at the pier in Miami only to find out that the manifest is quarantined for three weeks. They return later that night to steal it, only to find that the "package" is a live elephant (the G.O.P. mascot) which Cledus names Charlotte after his aunt. When Bandit removes a splinter from Charlotte's foot, she takes a liking to him.

Soon after the trio start off for Dallas, they are accosted for the first of several times by Sheriff Buford T. Justice, but Bandit outwits him and they escape. En route, they stop at a remote fuel station and notice something wrong with Charlotte. Moments later, an ambulance pulls in with Italian gynecologist Dr. Federico "Doc" Carlucci in the back. Doc is initially reluctant to help, but when his driver speeds off and unknowingly leaves him stranded, he asks to hitch a ride with them, agreeing to watch Charlotte.

Doc later finds that Charlotte is pregnant and due to give birth any time, but Bandit is determined to stay on schedule. Cledus and Carrie, on the other hand, would much rather help Charlotte prepare for her eventual birthing, but Bandit did not care, he stubbornly wanted to get Charlotte to Dallas on time with no exceptions. Entering Louisiana, Doc says that Charlotte is almost in labor and needs to be off her feet, but Bandit wants to get Charlotte to Dallas and get the job done with. Doc refuses and Cledus tries to explain that Charlotte cannot bounce around the truck while she's going to have a baby, but Bandit scolds him and reminds him that this is the last chance to get $400,000. Cledus decides that they all need a break and they go to a nearby nightclub where Don Williams is headlining. When Carrie sees Bandit scribbling on a napkin a picture of Charlotte cradled by suspended netting to keep her off her feet, she angrily leaves, but not before telling Bandit that she will come back only when he likes himself again. Carrie knew that Bandit was just being selfish towards her, Charlotte, Doc and Cledus, and had no interest in others, except receiving the $400,000 and taking Charlotte to Dallas. Later that night, a drunken Bandit makes his drawing a reality, and Doc agrees that his idea will work.

Buford intends to call for help from his brothers Reggie Van Justice, a Mountie Sergeant in Quebec, and Gaylord, an effeminate Texas State Patrolman. Later, as Bandit and Cledus enter Texas, Buford lures Bandit into a trap, a mass of forty Texas Patrol and Mountie cruisers pursuing him across the desert basin. Bandit orders Cledus to get to Dallas, but he enlists a large convoy of his trucker pals and comes to Bandit's rescue instead, wrecking nearly all of the cruisers in a giant demolition derby while Doc and Charlotte watch from the sidelines. The two escape by crossing a makeshift trailer bridge with Buford and his brothers in pursuit. Two of the trucks pull away, resulting in Gaylord and Reggie's cruisers crashing in the ensuing gap before they can cross, but Buford is still in pursuit, though his cruiser is barely functioning.

Cledus begs Bandit to stop at a safari reserve, Bandit agrees to it, where Charlotte finally gives birth to her baby. Bandit is ready to load them both back up in the truck and get them both to Dallas to the Governor of Texas, but Cledus and Doc refuse to, causing Cledus to knock him down when he insults him and because he was irritated with Bandit's selfishness towards him, Doc and Charlotte and her new born baby. Bandit was frustrated because he thinks that Carrie, Cledus and Doc were treating Charlotte like she is a human, but when he sees her in tears, Bandit finally comes to his senses and apologizes, realizing that taking care of Charlotte and caring for others is more important than getting $400,000.

Bandit later finds Carrie and starts acting more positive to her and tells her that he likes himself now, and that he does not want to be without her. He then tells her that he has not yet taken Charlotte to Dallas, and blew the money, but they can still make it. Carrie has forgiven Bandit and kisses him, and is overjoyed when she sees Charlotte's baby. Bandit asks Charlotte's permission for him and Carrie to get hitched, to which Charlotte trumpets her approval. Carrie is happy that Bandit is back to his old self again and was acting positive and selfless now. Doc, now riding in the cab with Cledus and Fred, also voices his approval, and they forgive Bandit as well and they all drive away with Charlotte and her baby in tow in circus carts on their way to Dallas, with Buford still in pursuit, now driving a Greyhound bus determined to catch him.

== Cast ==
- Burt Reynolds as Bo "The Bandit" Darville
- Jackie Gleason as Sheriff Buford T. Justice / Gaylord Justice (credited as Ms. Jackie Gleason) / Reginald Van Justice
- Jerry Reed as Cledus "The Snowman" Snow
- Dom DeLuise as Dr. Frederico "Doc" Carlucci
- Sally Field as Carrie "Frog"
- Pat McCormick as Enos "Big Enos" Burdette
- Paul Williams as Enos "Little Enos" Burdette
- David Huddleston as John Conn
- Mike Henry as Junior Justice
- John Anderson as The Governor
- Brenda Lee as Nice Lady
- The Statler Brothers as Themselves:
  - Phil Balsley
  - Lew DeWitt
  - Don Reid
  - Harold Reid
- "Mean Joe" Greene as himself
- Mel Tillis as Fairground Owner
- Joe Klecko as himself
- Don Williams as himself
- Terry Bradshaw as himself
- Nancy Lenehan as Ramona
- John Megna as P.T.
- Chuck Yeager as Party Guest
- John Robert Nicholson as The Patient

== Production ==
Smokey and the Bandit II was filmed simultaneously with The Cannonball Run, in which Burt Reynolds and Dom DeLuise also starred. Football players Joe Klecko and Terry Bradshaw also appear in both films. It is the first film to feature director Hal Needham's "Blooper Reel Credit Crawl" at the end, in that a collection of bloopers and outtakes from the film showed on one side of the screen while the closing credits slowly scrolled up the other side. The Cannonball Run, also directed by Needham, used this same technique. Buford T. Justice and his brothers Reggie and Gaylord were all portrayed by Jackie Gleason; Reggie was a Canadian version of Reginald Van Gleason III, a popular character from Gleason's television show.

The film was written and produced before it was announced that the 1980 Republican National Convention would be held in Detroit rather than Dallas. Many of the movie's scenes take place in northern Palm Beach County, especially at Burt Reynolds's ranch in Jupiter, Florida. Although Bo "Bandit" Darville (Reynolds) again sticks to a Pontiac Trans Am, this time a 1980 Turbo model with five color decals unlike 1981's single color decals, Cletus "Snowman" Snow (Jerry Reed) switches to a 1980 GMC General, silver with blue trim with the same mural on the trailer as in the original film. Bandit sold off the original car when he was down and out with the booze. They got the new car when Carrie "Frog" (Sally Field) traded in Junior Justice (Mike Henry)'s car when she left him.

A world-record automobile jump was captured on film during the "roundup sequence", when stuntman Gary Davis jumped a 1974 Dodge Monaco over 150 feet. Davis suffered compressed vertebrae as a result of a hard landing. The roundup sequence in the desert shows many new Pontiac LeMans sedans decorated as police cars being destroyed. The cars were originally ordered by a car rental agency which refused to accept the delivery as they were not equipped with air conditioning. Pontiac took the cars back and eventually gave them to the producers to be used in the film.

== Soundtrack ==
Smokey and the Bandit 2: Original Soundtrack

Soundtrack album by various artists
- Released: 1980
- Genre: Soundtrack
- Length: 31:59
- Label: MCA Records
- Producers: Jerry Kennedy; Snuff Garrett

Smokey and the Bandit 2: Original Soundtrack was released on vinyl, cassette tape and 8-track tape by MCA Records in 1980.

=== Track listing ===
No.	Title	Writer(s)	Length
1.	"Texas Bound and Flyin'" (Jerry Reed)	Jerry R. Hubbard	2:18
2.	"Charlotte's Web" (The Statler Brothers)	Cliff Crossord, John Durrill, Snuff Garrett	2:55
3.	"To Be Your Man" (Don Williams)	Danny Flowers, Don Williams	3:53
4.	"Ride Concrete Cowboy, Ride" (Roy Rogers and The Sons of the Pioneers)	Cliff Crossord, John Durrill, Snuff Garrett	2:55
5.	"Deliverance of the Wildwood Flower" (The Bandit Band)	Al Capps, Hank Moonjean, Hal Needham	1:54
6.	"Pecos Promenade" (Tanya Tucker)	Larry Collins, Sandy Pinkard, Snuff Garrett	2:27
7.	"Here's Lookin' at You" (Mel Tillis)	Sandy Pinkard, John Durrill, Sam Atchley	3:14
8.	"Do You Know You Are My Sunshine" (The Statler Brothers)	Don Reid, Harold Reid	2:12
9.	"Again and Again" (Brenda Lee)	Ben Peters	2:39
10.	"Let's Do Something Cheap and Superficial" (Burt Reynolds)	Richard Levinson	2:20
11.	"Tulsa Time" (Don Williams)	Danny Flowers	3:10
12.	"Pickin' Lone Star Style" (The Bandit Band)	Jerry Kennedy, Snuff Garrett	2:02
Total length:			31:59

== Reception ==
=== Box office ===
Smokey and the Bandit II grossed $10,883,835 in its opening weekend, the second highest ever at the time, behind Star Trek: The Motion Picture. It also set a record for an opening week, with a gross of $18,108,031. It was the eighth-most-popular 1980 film at the United States and Canada box office earning $66,132,626. This box office income inspired a third film.

=== Critical response ===
The film received almost completely negative reviews from critics who felt that it suffered badly in comparison to the original. On Rotten Tomatoes, it has an approval rating of 25% based on reviews from eight critics. Roger Ebert gave it a one out of four stars and stated that there was "[in 1980] no need for this movie. That's true of most sequels, but it's especially true of Smokey and the Bandit II, which is basically just the original movie done again, not as well ... how can I say it's lazy when it has 50 trucks doing stunts in it? Because it takes a lot less thought to fill up a movie with stunts than to create a comedy that's genuinely funny".

Burt Reynolds later said that he did not enjoy working on the film at all, feeling that it was an unnecessary sequel put together by Universal purely for money-making reasons rather than to try making a good picture.

== Sequel ==
The film was followed by another sequel three years later, Smokey and the Bandit Part 3 (1983), in which Reynolds only made a brief cameo appearance, and Sally Field did not appear.
