= Hal Needham =

American stunt performer and film director (1931–2013)

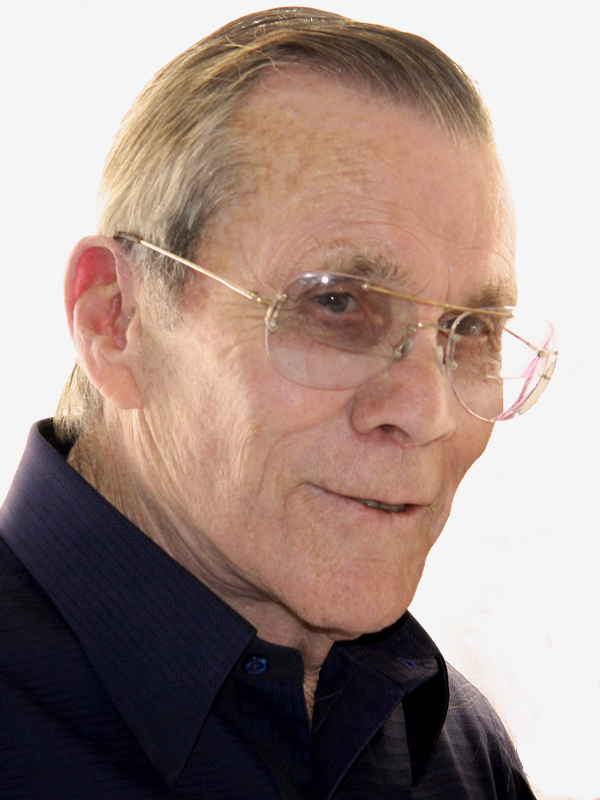
- Needham in 2011
- Born: Hal Brett Needham; March 6, 1931; Memphis, Tennessee, U.S.
- Died: October 25, 2013 (aged 82); Los Angeles, California, U.S.
- Occupations: Stuntman; film director; actor; writer; NASCAR team owner
- Years active: 1956–1996
- Spouses: Arlene R. Wheeler (m. 1960; div. 1977) Dani Crayne (m. 1981; div. 1987) Ellyn Wynne Williams (m. 1996)

Hal Brett Needham (March 6, 1931 – October 25, 2013) was an American stuntman, film director, actor, writer, and NASCAR team owner. He is best known for his frequent collaborations with actor Burt Reynolds, usually in films involving fast cars, such as Smokey and the Bandit (1977), Hooper (1978), The Cannonball Run (1981) and Stroker Ace (1983).

In his later years, Needham moved out of stunt work, and focused his energy on the world land speed record project. In 2001, Needham received a Lifetime Achievement Award from the Taurus World Stunt Awards, and in 2012, he was awarded a Governors Award by the Academy of Motion Picture Arts and Sciences.

== Early years ==
Needham was born in Memphis, Tennessee, a son of Edith May (née Robinson) and Howard Needham. He was the youngest of three children. Raised in Arkansas and Missouri, Needham served in the United States Army as a paratrooper during the Korean War, worked as a treetopper (an arborist who performs tree topping services), and was a billboard model for Viceroy Cigarettes while beginning a career in Hollywood as a motion picture stuntman.

== Career ==
Needham's first break was as the stunt double for actor Richard Boone on the popular TV western Have Gun – Will Travel. Needham trained under John Wayne's stunt double Chuck Roberson and quickly became one of the top stuntmen of the 1960s on such films as How the West Was Won, The Bridge at Remagen, McLintock!, The War Lord, and Little Big Man. He doubled regularly for Clint Walker and Burt Reynolds (he met Reynolds during production of Riverboat). He played a cowboy in an episode of the TV Western Gunsmoke (S8E36 - “The Odyssey of Jubal Tanner”). Needham moved into stunt coordinating and directing second unit action, while designing and introducing air bags and other innovative equipment to the industry. Needham at one time lived in Reynolds' guesthouse for the better part of 12 years.

In 1971, he and fellow stuntmen Glenn Wilder and Ronnie Rondell Jr. formed Stunts Unlimited. Needham had written a screenplay titled Smokey and the Bandit and his friend Reynolds offered him the chance to direct. The film was a huge hit, and the two followed it with Hooper, Smokey and the Bandit II, The Cannonball Run, Stroker Ace, and Cannonball Run II. Needham also directed the TV pilots Stunts Unlimited (1980) and The Stockers (1981), neither of which was picked up as a series. His final theatrical release as director was the 1986 BMX film Rad.

In 1977, Gabriel Toys introduced the "Hal Needham Western Movie Stunt Set" complete with a cardboard old west saloon movie set, lights and props, a toy movie camera and a spring-launched Hal Needham action figure that would break through a balcony railing, land on breakaway table and chairs and crash through a window. They were only manufactured for a short time and have since become highly collectible.

Needham moved out of stunt work, focusing his energy on the World Land Speed Record project that eventually became the Budweiser Rocket, driven by stuntman Stan Barrett. The team failed to set an officially sanctioned World land speed record with the vehicle, and their claims to have broken the sound barrier in 1979 have been heavily disputed.

In the 1980s, he and Reynolds co-owned the Mach 1 Racing team, which fielded the Skoal Bandit No. 33 Pontiac in the NASCAR Winston Cup Series, with Barrett as the driver. Stan was later replaced by Harry Gant, and the team eventually switched to Buicks. The Skoal Bandit became a championship contender, and Gant's 18 victories resulted in his Nascar Hall of Fame nomination.

In 1986, Needham, alongside William L. Fredrick, was awarded a Scientific and Engineering Award for his efforts in developing the Shotmaker Elite camera car and crane.

In 2001, Needham received a Lifetime Achievement Award from the Taurus World Stunt Awards. In 2012, he was awarded a Governors Award by the Academy of Motion Pictures Arts and Sciences, where he was introduced by Quentin Tarantino.

Needham and his relationship with Reynolds inspired the Cliff Booth/Rick Dalton friendship in Tarantino's 2019 film Once Upon a Time in Hollywood.

== Rocket car ==
Needham was the owner of the Budweiser Rocket car, a vehicle intended to break the speed of sound on land.

== Death ==
Needham died on October 25, 2013, in Los Angeles, aged 82, shortly after being diagnosed with cancer.

== Bibliography ==
- Needham, Hal (2011). Stuntman!: My Car-Crashing, Plane-Jumping, Bone-Breaking, Death-Defying Hollywood Life. New York: Little, Brown and Company. ISBN 978-0-316-07899-3. OCLC 548642135.

== Filmography as actor ==
- The Fiend Who Walked the West (1958) – Courtroom Spectator (uncredited)
- Shoot Out at Big Sag (1962) – Saloon Brawler (uncredited)
- McLintock! (1963) – Carter (uncredited)
- Advance to the Rear (1964) – Rebel Soldier (uncredited)
- In Harm's Way (1965) – Airman in the Blue Lagoon (uncredited)
- The Great Race (1965) – Saloon Brawler (uncredited)
- The War Wagon (1967) – Hite
- The Devil's Brigade (1968) – The Sergeant
- The Undefeated (1969) – Yankee Corporal at River Crossing (uncredited)
- One More Train to Rob (1971) – Bert Gant
- Sometimes a Great Notion (1971) – Man at Racetrack
- The Culpepper Cattle Co. (1972) – Burgess
- McQ (1974) – Santiago Henchman (uncredited)
- Blazing Saddles (1974) – Outlaw (uncredited)
- French Connection II (1975) – Doyle Kidnapper (uncredited)
- W.W. and the Dixie Dancekings (1975) – Trooper Carson
- Take a Hard Ride (1975) – Garmes (uncredited)
- Jackson County Jail (1976) – Chief of Fallsburg Police
- Death Car on the Freeway (1979) – Mr. Blanchard
- Stunts Unlimited (1980) – H.N.
- The Cannonball Run (1981) – Ambulance EMT (uncredited)
- Megaforce (1982) – Technician (uncredited)
- Stroker Ace (1983) – Man Punching Stroker Into Ladies Room (uncredited)
- Cannonball Run II (1984) – Porsche 928 Driver with Cowboy Hat (uncredited)

== Filmography as director ==
- White Lightning (1973) (2nd unit director)
- The Longest Yard (1974) (2nd unit director, car chase)
- Gator (1976) (2nd unit director)
- Smokey and the Bandit (1977)
- Hooper (1978)
- The Villain (1979)
- Death Car on the Freeway (1979, TV)
- Stunts Unlimited (1980, TV)
- Smokey and the Bandit II (1980)
- The Stockers (1981)
- The Cannonball Run (1981)
- Megaforce (1982)
- Stroker Ace (1983)
- Cannonball Run II (1983)
- Rad (1986)
- Body Slam (1987)
- Bandit Goes Country (1994, TV)
- Bandit Bandit (1994, TV)
- Beauty and the Bandit (1994, TV)
- Bandit's Silver Angel (1994, TV)
- Hard Time: Hostage Hotel (1999, TV)
