= Earl Holliman filmography =

Filmography

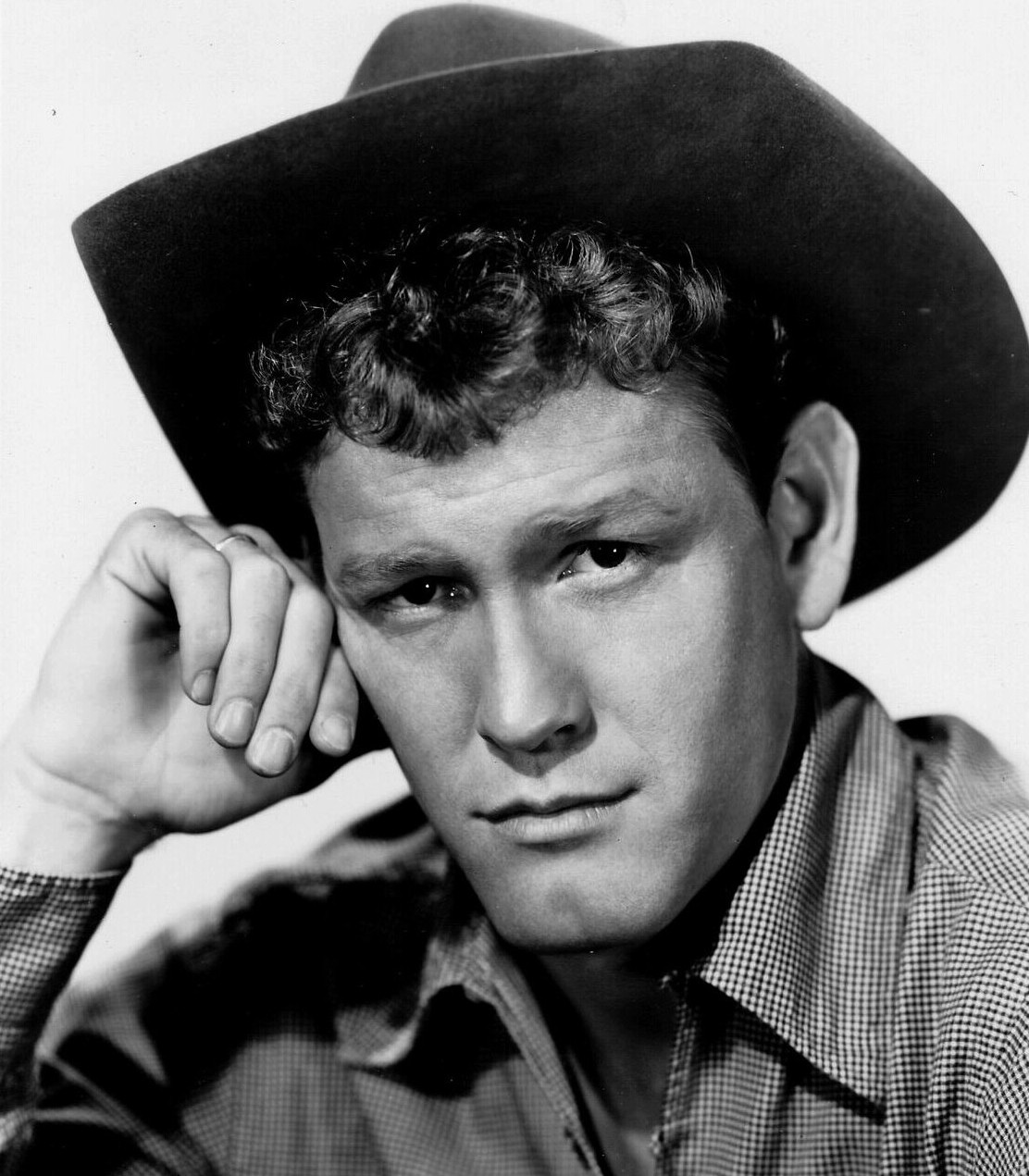
Holliman in a publicity portrait for The Rainmaker (1956)

Earl Holliman (September 11, 1928 – November 25, 2024) was an American film and TV actor who appeared in 97 features between 1952 and 2000, including recurring roles on the television series Hotel de Paree, Wide Country, Police Woman, The Thorn Birds, P.S. I Luv U, Delta, Caroline in the City, and Night Man (along with various guest spots on several game and talk shows). He won a Golden Globe Award in 1957 for Best Supporting Actor in a Motion Picture for his work in The Rainmaker (1956). This is his complete filmography, as well as his awards, nominations, and personal appearances.

== Films ==
Year	Title	Role	Notes	Ref.
1952	Pony Soldier	Undetermined secondary role	Uncredited	
1953	Destination Gobi	Frank Swenson	Uncredited	
1953	The Girls of Pleasure Island	Marine	Uncredited	
1953	Scared Stiff	Elevator boy	Uncredited	
1953	Devil's Canyon	Joe	Also known as Arizona Outpost	
1953	East of Sumatra	Cupid	Credited as Henry Earl Holliman (His full name)	
1954	Tennessee Champ	Happy Jackfield		
1954	Broken Lance	Denny Devereaux		
1954	The Bridges at Toko-Ri	Nestor Gamidge		
1955	The Big Combo	Mingo		
1955	I Died a Thousand Times	Red		
1956	Forbidden Planet	Cook		
1956	The Burning Hills	Mort Bayliss		
1956	Giant	Bob Dace		
1956	The Rainmaker	Jim Curry	Golden Globe Award for Best Supporting Actor – Motion Picture	
1957	Gunfight at the O.K. Corral	Charles Bassett		
1957	Trooper Hook	Jeff Bennett		
1957	Don't Go Near the Water	Adam Garrett		
1958	Hot Spell	John Henry "Buddy" Duval Jr.		
1959	The Trap	Tippy Anderson		
1959	Last Train from Gun Hill	Rick Belden		
1960	Visit to a Small Planet	Conrad		
1961	Armored Command	Sergeant Mike		
1961	Summer and Smoke	Archie Kramer		
1965	The Sons of Katie Elder	Matt Elder		
1967	A Covenant with Death	Brian Talbot		
1968	The Power	Talbot Scott		
1968	Anzio	Sergeant Stimler		
1969	The Desperate Mission	Shad Clay	Television film	
1970	Smoke	Cal Finch	Television film	
1970	Tribes	DePayster	Television film	
1971	Montserrat	Luhan	Television film	
1971	Cannon	Magruder	Television film	
1972	The Biscuit Eater	Harve McNeil		
1973	The Six Million Dollar Man: Wine, Women and War	Harry Donner	Television film	
1973	Trapped	David Moore	Television film	
1974	Cry Panic	Sheriff Ross Cabot	Television film	
1974	I Love You... Good-bye	Tom Chandler		
1977	Alexander: The Other Side of Dawn	Ray Church	Television film	
1979	Good Luck, Miss Wyckoff	Ed Eckles		
1979	The Solitary Man	Dave Keyes	Television film	
1980	Where the Ladies Go	Buck	Television film	
1981	Sharky's Machine	Donald Hotchkins		
1982	Country Gold	Wade Purcell	Television film (Remake of the 1950 motion picture All About Eve)	
1986	Shattered... If Your Kid's on Drugs	Kim's Father	Television film	
1987	American Harvest	Krab Hogan	Television film (also known as Race Against the Harvest and Golden Harvest)	
1987	Gunsmoke: Return to Dodge	Jake Flagg	Television film	
1997	Night Man	Frank Domino	Television film	
1999	Bad City Blues	Joe Gags		
2000	The Perfect Tenant	Arthur Michaels	Final film role	

== Episodic television ==
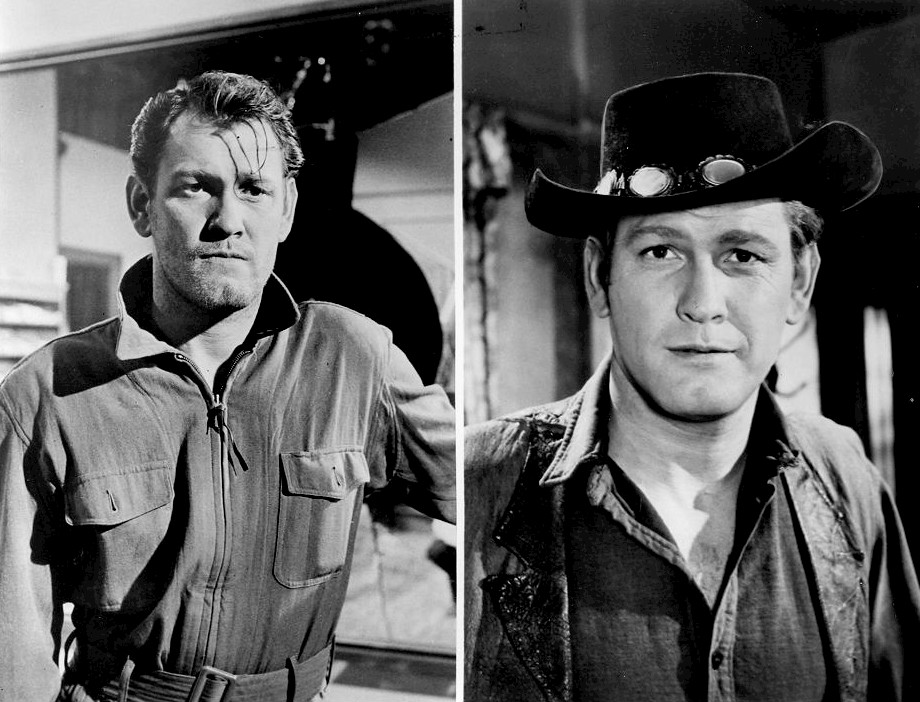
On October 2, 1959, CBS showcased Earl Holliman in two starring TV roles on the same night: in the debut episode of The Twilight Zone, and as the Sundance Kid in his own series, Hotel de Paree (1959–60).

Year	Title	Role	Notes	Ref.
1957	Matinee Theater	Tom Cotterell	"The Man with the Pointed Toes"	
1957	Playhouse 90	Capt. Volodney	"The Dark Side of the Earth"	
1958	Playhouse 90	Robin Tripp	"The Return of Ansel Gibbs"	
1958	Kraft Television Theatre	Singer	"The Battle for Wednesday Night"	
1958	Kraft Television Theatre	American airman	"The Sea Is Boiling Hot"	
1958	Westinghouse Desilu Playhouse	Les Tranier	"Silent Thunder"	
1958	Studio One	Wayne Pilgrim	"The Lady Died at Midnight"	
1959	The Twilight Zone	Mike Ferris	"Where Is Everybody?" (series premiere)	
1959–60	Hotel de Paree	Sundance Kid	Starring role, 33 episodes	
1961	The Dick Powell Show	Paul Williams	"Killer in the House"	
1961	Westinghouse Presents	Webster	"The Dispossessed"	
1962	Bus Stop	Allan Stumbo	"The Stubborn Stumbos"	
1962	Checkmate	Jack Quentin	"The Bold and the Tough"	
1962	General Electric Theater	David Seymour	"The Troubled Heart"	
1962–63	Wide Country	Mitch Guthrie	Starring role (28 episodes)	
1964	The Great Adventure	Will Cross	"Teeth of the Lion"	
1965	Bonanza	Sherman Clegg	"The Flannel-Mouth Gun"	
1965	Dr. Kildare	Capt. Bob Hill	"Wings of Hope"	
1965	Slattery's People	Major Roger Dyne	"The Hero"	
1965	The Fugitive	Charley Judd	"The Good Guys and the Bad Guys"	
1965	The Virginian	Wiley	"Ring of Silence"	
1965	12 O'Clock High	Lt. Paul Stiger	"The Ticket"	
1966	The F.B.I.	Robert Charles Porter	"Special Delivery"	
1967	Custer	Dan Samuels	"Pursued"	
1968	Judd, for the Defense	Sheriff Lonny Querido	"No Law Against Murder"	
1969	Marcus Welby, M.D.	Father Hugh	"Neither Punch nor Judy"	
1969	Gunsmoke	Will Smith	"A Man Called Smith"	
1970	The F.B.I.	Walter Carr	"The Quest"	
1970	Gunsmoke	Will Hackett	"Hackett"	
1970	It Takes a Thief	Major Arlin McCoy	"Situation Red"	
1970–73	The Wonderful World of Disney	Cal Finch; Cal Winslow	"Smoke" "The Boy and the Bronc Buster"	
1971	Alias Smith and Jones	Wheat	"Alias Smith and Jones" (S01, E01) "The Day They Hanged Kid Curry" (S02, E01)	
1971	The F.B.I.	Drake Faron	"Dynasty of Hate"	
1971	Ironside	Gordy Brokaw	"The Target"	
1971	Medical Center	Dr. Ian Hayton	"Suspected"	
1972	The Rookies	Easy Wyatt	"A Very Special Piece of Ground"	
1973	The Streets of San Francisco	Chris	"The Stamp of Death"	
1973	Medical Center	Brent	"Impact"	
1973	The F.B.I.	Frank	"The Payoff"	
1973	Gunsmoke	Boone Shadler	"Shadler"	
1974	Police Story	Sgt. Charlie Ryan	"Fingerprint"	
1974–78	Police Woman	Sgt. Bill Crowley	Main cast (91 episodes)	
1977	The Dean Martin Celebrity Roast	Himself	"Angie Dickinson"	
1979	CHiPs	Himself	"Roller Disco: Part 2"	Uncredited
1980	The American Sportsman	Himself	"Mountain Gorilla"	
1983	The Thorn Birds	Luddie Mueller	Television miniseries	
1986	Hotel	Owen McDermott	"Separations"	
1990	Empty Nest	Mike Bradovitch	"Harry's Excellent Adventure"	
1991-92	P.S. I Luv U	Matthew Durning	Main Cast (13 episodes)	
1991	Murder, She Wrote	Sheriff J.T. Tanner	"Who Killed J. B. Fletcher?"	
1992	In the Heat of the Night	Dr. Lambert	"Last Rights"	
1992	The Larry Sanders Show	Himself	"The Hey Now Episode"	
1992–93	Delta	Darden Towe	Main cast (17 episodes)	
1994	Murder, She Wrote	Wayne Platte	"Roadkill"	
1995	American Masters	Himself	"Rod Serling: Submitted for Your Approval"	
1996	Captain Planet and the Planeteers	Milton (voice)	"Never the Twain Shall Meet"	
1996–99	Caroline in the City	Fred Duffy	"Caroline and the Twenty-Eight-Pound Walleye" "Caroline and the Ancestral Home" "Caroline and the Big Move"	
1997–99	Night Man	Frank Dominus	Main cast (25 episodes)	
2000	Chicken Soup for the Soul	Gramps	"Summer School"	
2015	Voces	Himself	"Children of Giant"	

== Non-acting appearances ==
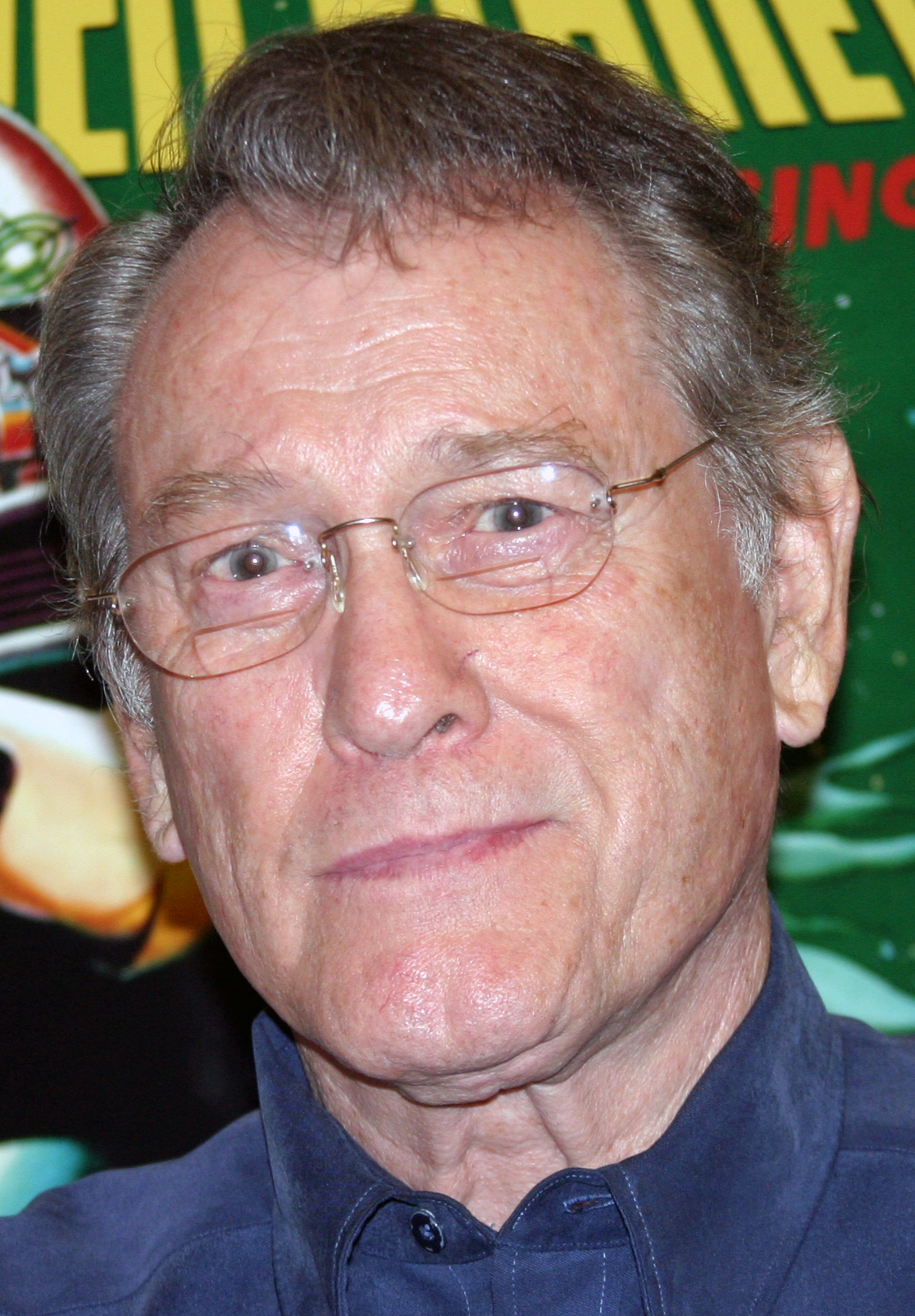
Earl Holliman at the 2006 San Diego Comic-Con, promoting the 50th anniversary remastered DVD release of Forbidden Planet

Year	Title	Role	Notes	Ref.
1956	The Jukebox Jury	Himself		
1958	The Lux Show	Himself		
1958	The 33rd Annual Academy Awards	Himself	Audience Attendee	
1961-62	Here’s Hollywood	Himself		
1963	The Mike Douglas Show	Himself		
1963-79	The Tonight Show with Johnny Carson	Himself	14 guest spots (recurring appearances include 3 in 1972, 5 in 1975, and 2 in 1977)	
1965	You Don't Say	Himself		
1966	The 38th Annual Academy Awards	Himself	Audience Attendee	
1971	The Movie Game	Himself		
1974	Celebrity Bowling	Himself	Holliman and Robert Culp vs. James Farentino and Stephen Young	
1975	The Bob Braun Show	Himself		
1975	The Mike Douglas Show	Himself		
1975-80	The Hollywood Squares	Himself	33 episodes	
1976	The 2nd Annual People's Choice Awards	Himself	Presenter	
1976	The John Davidson Show	Himself	He also guest performed singing 2 songs	
1975-76	The Magnificent Marble Machine	Himself		
1975-76	The Dinah Shore Show	Himself		
1977	The 3rd Annual People's Choice Awards	Himself	Presenter	
1977	AFI Life Achievement Award: A Tribute to Bette Davis	Himself		
1977	The 29th Annual Primetime Emmy Awards	Himself	Presenter	
1977	To Say the Least	Himself		
1977	Circus of the Stars	Himself	Performer	
1980	Fossey's War	Himself	Documentary	
1980	CHiPs	Himself	"The Great 5K Star Race" and "Boulder Wrap Party: Part 2"	
1983	All-Star Party for Frank Sinatra	Himself		
1983 – 91	The $10,000 Pyramid	Himself	95 episodes	
1984	The 10th Annual People's Choice Awards	Himself	Accepting Award for Favorite TV Mini Series	
1985	Doris Day’s Best Friends	Himself		
1986	Wildside	Himself	Documentary in which he both hosted and narrated	
1986	All-Star Party for Clint Eastwood	Himself		
1987	AFI Lifetime Achievement Award: A Tribute to Barbara Stanwyck	Himself		
1987	The 44th Annual Golden Globe Awards	Himself		
1988	The 57th Annual Hollywood Christmas Parade	Himself	Seasonal Television Special	
1989	Safe House	Himself	Video documentary	
1989	The 58th Annual Hollywood Christmas Parade	Himself	Seasonal Television Special	
1990	The 7th Annual Television Academy Hall of Fame Awards	Himself	Television Special	
1991	The $25,000 Pyramid	Himself		
1991	The Chuck Woolery Show	Himself		
1991	AFI Lifetime Achievement Award: A Tribute to Kirk Douglas	Himself		
1992	One on One with John Tesh	Himself		
1992	The 61st Annual Hollywood Christmas Parade	Himself	Seasonal Television Special	
1993	The 7th Annual Genesis Awards	Himself	Host	
1994	Golden Globes 50th Anniversary Celebration	Himself		
1995	The 9th Annual Genesis Awards	Himself	Presenter	
1996	Biography: Burt Lancaster – Daring to Reach	Himself		
1997	The 69th Annual Academy Awards	Himself	Audience Attendee	
1998	Memories of Giant	Himself		
1998	The 70th Annual Academy Awards	Himself	Audience Attendee	
1999	The 13th Annual Genesis Awards	Himself	Presenter	
1999	Biography: Angie Dickinson - Tinseltown's Classiest Broad	Himself		
2000	E! True Hollywood Story: Rod Serling - Beyond The Twilight Zone	Himself		
2000	The 14th Annual Genesis Awards	Himself	Presenter	
2001	Intimate Portrait: Lisa Hartman-Black	Himself		
2003	Intimate Portrait: Angie Dickinson	Himself		
2003	Return to Giant	Himself	Video documentary	
2005	Madman Muntz: American Maverick	Himself	Documentary (also notes him with a special thanks)	
2006	Robby the Robot: Engineering a Sci-Fi Icon	Himself	Video documentary short	
2006	Amazing! Exploring the Far Reaches of Forbidden Planet	Himself	Video documentary short	
2007	John Wayne Behind The Scenes	Himself	Video documentary	
2008	Stanley Rubin: A Work in Progress	Himself		
2009	The Rules of Film Noir	Himself	Television Movie Documentary (also features archive footage of him as Mingo in The Big Combo)	
2015	Tab Hunter Confidential	Himself	Documentary	
2021	Journey to Royal	Himself	Documentary	

== Unmade films ==
Year	Film	Role and fate of film or role	Ref.
1956	Bus Stop	Beauregard Decker (part given to Don Murray)	
1958	Cat on a Hot Tin Roof	Brick Pollitt (part given to Paul Newman)	
1958	Lonelyhearts	Adam White (part given to Montgomery Clift)	
1959	Operation Petticoat	Lieutenant, Junior Grade (later Commander) Nicholas "Nick" Holden, USNR (part given to Tony Curtis)	
1960	The Apartment	Calvin Clifford (C. C.) "Bud" Baxter (part given to Jack Lemmon)	
1960	Gentleman's Club	Christopher Allen (Was to be filmed at Metro-Goldwyn-Mayer Studios and would have been an all-male remake of 1939's The Women with Holliman portraying a gold-digging womanizer, basically a masculine spoof of Joan Crawford's character of Crystal Allen in the original all-female version, but the film was never made.)	
1960	Peking to Paris	While residing in France, he was signed by director Dino Delaurentiss to appear in the leading role of a racer who is participating in the historic Peking to Paris automobile race in 1905. It was never made.	
1960	The Last Holiday	A romantic film to be done by an unnamed French producer to be filmed in both Paris, France, and New York City, New York. Although, the title and plot had been generated, it was never made.	
1961	The Roman Spring of Mrs. Stone	Paolo di Leo (part given to Warren Beatty)	
1963	Love with the Proper Stranger	Rocky Papasano (part given to Steve McQueen)	
1968	Charly	Charly Gordon (part given to Cliff Robertson)	
1972	The Burtons Ahead	William Burton (Was to be filmed by Paramount Pictures, he would have played an American businessman who takes his family on an extended vacation in Europe, the film was never made. The only thing that exists of this are promotional stills.)	
1975	Nashville	Haven Hamilton (part given to Henry Gibson)	
1983	A Christmas Story	The Old Man Parker (part given to Darren McGavin)	
1994	Our Anniversary	Toby Griffins (Was to be a made-for-TV movie for the Lifetime channel and would have paired him alongside Rue McClanahan as his wife playing a couple nearing their 40th wedding anniversary who not only look back on the years of their marriage but also ponder as too whether how many more they'll have when the misses discovers she has contracted a health condition that might be fatal, which later proves to be a negative prognosis ensuring they'll have many more happy years ahead due to her rediscovered perfect health. It was never made.)	
1997	12 Angry Men	Juror No. 8 (part given to Jack Lemmon)	
1998	Joshua's Wish	Joshua Hunsinger (Was to be a made for TV Christmas special for Hallmark Hall of Fame and would have told the story of a man whose family wants to gift him with a holiday season to remember by reuniting him with a childhood friend whom he hadn't seen in years having been separated from one another during the final years of the Great Depression. It was never made.)	
1999	Doctor's Order	Dr. Dennis Albertan (Was to be a made for TV comedy film about a family of doctors trying to push the patriarch of the family into retiring following several years of serving his community in the medical field and the antics they use to elevate him towards it. It was never made but if it had the rest of the cast would've included Joel Higgins, Morgan Brittany, and Barry Williams as his children, also doctors, and Marion Ross as the wife.)	
