= 14th Golden Globe Awards =

Film award ceremony in 1957

- Date: February 28, 1957

Highlights
- Best Picture: Around the World in 80 Days

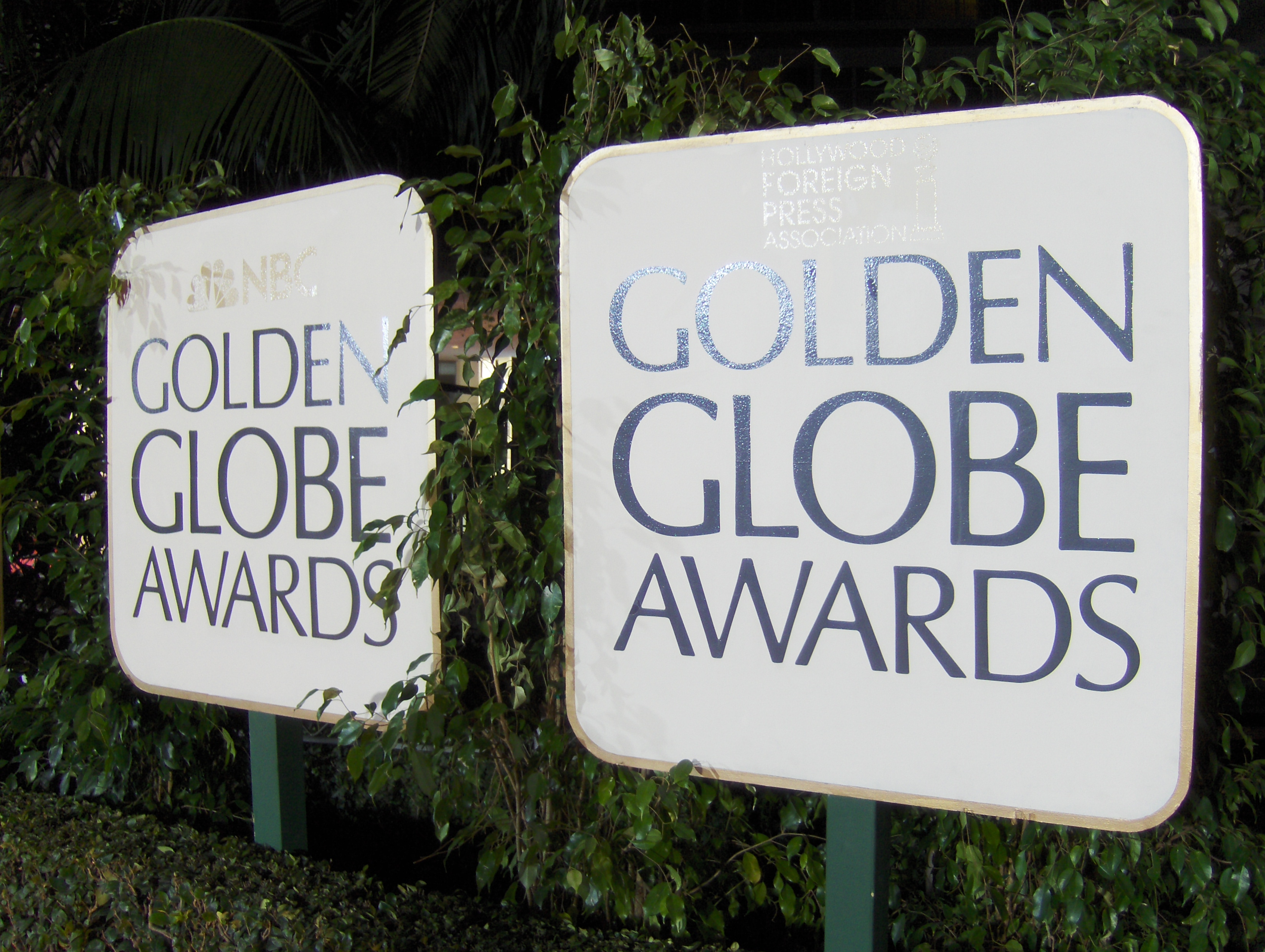
Signs for the Golden Globe Awards.

The 14th Golden Globe Awards, honoring the best in film for 1956 films, were held on February 28, 1957, at the Cocoanut Grove, Ambassador Hotel (Los Angeles).

== Winners and Nominees ==
=== Best Motion Picture - Drama ===
Around the World in 80 Days directed by Michael Anderson

- Giant directed by George Stevens
- Lust for Life directed by Vincente Minnelli
- The Rainmaker directed by Joseph Anthony
- War and Peace directed by King Vidor

=== Best Motion Picture - Comedy or Musical ===
The King and I directed by Walter Lang

- Bus Stop directed by Joshua Logan
- The Opposite Sex directed by David Miller
- The Solid Gold Cadillac directed by Richard Quine
- The Teahouse of the August Moon directed by Daniel Mann

=== Best Performance by an Actor in a Leading Role - Drama ===
Kirk Douglas - Lust for Life

- Gary Cooper - Friendly Persuasion
- Charlton Heston - The Ten Commandments
- Burt Lancaster - The Rainmaker
- Karl Malden - Baby Doll

=== Best Performance by an Actress in a Leading Role - Drama ===
Ingrid Bergman - Anastasia

- Carroll Baker - Baby Doll
- Helen Hayes - Anastasia
- Katharine Hepburn - The Rainmaker
- Audrey Hepburn - War and Peace

=== Best Performance by an Actor in a Leading Role - Comedy or Musical ===
Cantinflas - Around the World in 80 Days

- Marlon Brando - The Teahouse of the August Moon
- Yul Brynner - The King and I
- Glenn Ford - The Teahouse of the August Moon
- Danny Kaye - The Court Jester

=== Best Performance by an Actress in a Leading Role - Comedy or Musical ===
Deborah Kerr - The King and I

- Judy Holliday - The Solid Gold Cadillac
- Machiko Kyō - The Teahouse of the August Moon
- Marilyn Monroe - Bus Stop
- Debbie Reynolds - Bundle of Joy

=== Best Performance by an Actor in a Supporting Role in a Motion Picture ===
Earl Holliman - The Rainmaker

- Eddie Albert - The Teahouse of the August Moon
- Oscar Homolka - War and Peace
- Anthony Quinn - Lust for Life
- Eli Wallach - Baby Doll

=== Best Performance by an Actress in a Supporting Role in a Motion Picture ===
Eileen Heckart - The Bad Seed

- Mildred Dunnock - Baby Doll
- Marjorie Main - Friendly Persuasion
- Dorothy Malone - Written on the Wind
- Patty McCormack - The Bad Seed

=== Best Director-Motion Picture ===
Elia Kazan - Baby Doll

- Michael Anderson - Around the World in 80 Days
- Vincente Minnelli - Lust for Life
- George Stevens - Giant
- King Vidor - War and Peace

=== Most Promising Newcomer - Male ===
Three way tie

- John Kerr
- Paul Newman
- Anthony Perkins

=== Most Promising Newcomer - Female ===
Three way tie

- Carroll Baker
- Jayne Mansfield
- Natalie Wood

=== New Foreign Star of the year - Actor ===
Jacques Bergerac

=== New Foreign star of the year - Actress ===
Taina Elg

=== Best Film Promoting International Understanding ===
Battle Hymn directed by Douglas Sirk

- Friendly Persuasion directed by William Wyler
- The King and I directed by Walter Lang
- The Teahouse of the August Moon directed by Daniel Mann

=== Television Achievement - Best TV Show ===
- Playhouse 90
- This Is Your Life
- Matinee Theater
- The Mickey Mouse Club
- Cheyenne

=== Cecil B. DeMille Award ===
Mervyn LeRoy

=== Hollywood Citizenship Award ===
Ronald Reagan

=== Special Achievement Awards ===
- Dimitri Tiomkin for recognition in film music
- Edwin Schallert for advancing the film industry
- Elizabeth Taylor for consistent performance

=== Henrietta Award (World Film Favorites) ===
James Dean and Kim Novak
