= Alex & the Gypsy =

1976 film by John Korty

- Theatrical release poster
- Directed by: John Korty
- Screenplay by: Lawrence B. Marcus
- Story by: Stanley Elkin
- Produced by: Richard Shepherd
- Starring: Jack Lemmon; Geneviève Bujold; James Woods; Gino Ardito; Robert Emhardt; Titos Vandis
- Cinematography: Bill Butler
- Edited by: Donn Cambern
- Music by: Henry Mancini
- Production company: 20th Century Fox
- Distributed by: 20th Century Fox
- Release date: October 3, 1976
- Running time: 100 minutes
- Country: United States
- Language: English

Alex & the Gypsy is a 1976 American comedy film directed by John Korty and written by Lawrence B. Marcus. The film stars Jack Lemmon, Geneviève Bujold, James Woods, Gino Ardito, Robert Emhardt and Titos Vandis. The film was released on October 3, 1976, by 20th Century Fox.

== Cast ==
- Jack Lemmon as Alexander Main
- Geneviève Bujold as Maritza
- James Woods as Crainpool
- Gino Ardito as The Golfer
- Robert Emhardt as Judge Ehrlinger
- Titos Vandis as Treska
- William Cort as Public Defender
- Todd Martin as Roy Blake
- Frank Doubleday as Prisoner
- Joseph X. Flaherty as Morgan
- Robert Miano as Young Shepherd
- Al Checco as Nat
- Harold Sylvester as First Goon
- Clyde Kusatsu as X-Ray Technician
- Alan DeWitt as Attendant
- Eddra Gale as Telephone Lady
- Victor Pinheiro as Mr. Chandler

== Reception ==
Roger Ebert gave the film two and a half stars out of four, saying "Alex and the Gypsy takes a strange, disjointed story and tells it with enough style that the movie sometimes works in spite of itself. It's so uncertain of its own intentions that we never do discover quite what its two central characters feel about each other, but in the midst of this mess there are five or six scenes that are really fine. And there's some spirited acting, too, by Jack Lemmon as a rumpled bailbondsman, and Genevieve Bujold as, of all things, a gypsy."
