= Eddra Gale =

American actress and singer (1921–2001)

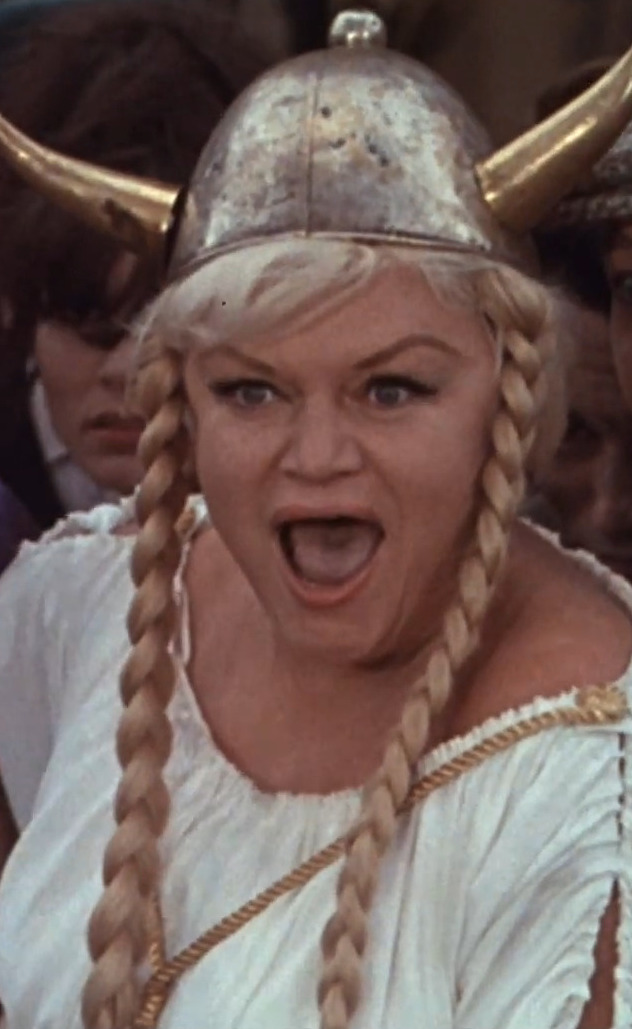
- Gale in 1965
- Born: July 16, 1921; Chicago, Illinois, U.S.
- Died: May 13, 2001 (aged 79); Deming, New Mexico, U.S.
- Occupations: Actress; singer

Eddra Gale (July 16, 1921 – May 13, 2001) was an American actress and singer of Czech descent.

== Early years ==
Born in Chicago, Illinois, Gale was the daughter of an executive with a men's clothing company. Both of her parents were musically oriented. Gale began performing when she was three years old. She spoke French, German, Italian, and Spanish.

== Career ==
Originally an opera singer, Gale later performed as a concert singer in Rome. Film director Federico Fellini spotted her in Milan, and cast her for the role of Saraghina, the "devil woman", in Fellini's 8½ (1963), who is used in a flashback representing the male lead's first erotic experience as a young boy. She appeared around the same time in Tutto e Musica and Gidget Goes to Rome (also 1963).

Following her role in 8½,, she appeared in the role of Peter Sellers' wife, Anna Fassbender, in What's New Pussycat? (1965), as a guest in Hotel Paradiso (1966), and in small roles in films such as Three Bites of the Apple (1967), The Graduate (1967), A Man Called Gannon (1968), I Love You, Alice B. Toklas (1968), The Maltese Bippy (1969), The Desperate Mission (1969), and Alex & the Gypsy (1976). Her last film appearance was as "Genevieve" in Somewhere in Time (1980).

== Death ==
Gale died aged 79 in Deming, New Mexico, from complications following a stroke.

== Filmography ==
Year	Title	Role	Notes
1963	8½	La Saraghina	
1963	Gidget Goes to Rome	Fat Party Guest	Uncredited
1963	Tutto è musica		
1964	La donna è una cosa meravigliosa		
1965	What's New Pussycat?	Anna Fassbender	
1966	Hotel Paradiso	Hotel Guest	
1967	Three Bites of the Apple	The Yodeler	
1967	Matchless		
1967	Games	Party Guest #6	
1967	The Graduate	Woman on Bus	
1968	A Man Called Gannon	Louisa	
1968	I Love You, Alice B. Toklas	Love Lady	
1969	The Maltese Bippy	Helga	
1969	The Desperate Mission	Delores the Bartender	TV movie
1970	The Strawberry Statement	Dean's Secretary	
1975	Farewell, My Lovely	Singer	
1976	Revenge of the Cheerleaders	Nurse Beam	
1976	Alex & the Gypsy	Telephone Lady	
1980	Somewhere in Time	Genevieve	(final film role)
