= Beulah Land (miniseries) =

- Based on: Beulah Land; Look Away, Beulah Land by Lonnie Coleman
- Teleplay by: JP Miller (under pseudonym Jacques Meunier)
- Directed by: Virgil W. Vogel (3 episodes); Harry Falk (2 episodes)
- Starring: Lesley Ann Warren; Michael Sarrazin; Jenny Agutter
- Music by: Allyn Ferguson
- Country of origin: United States
- Original language: English
- No. of episodes: 3

Production
- Executive producer: David Gerber
- Production companies: David Ferber Productions; Columbia Pictures Television

Original release
- Network: NBC
- Release: October 7 – October 9, 1980

Beulah Land is a 1980 three-part television miniseries which aired on NBC. The series was based on the novels Beulah Land and Look Away, Beulah Land by Lonnie Coleman.

The Civil War-themed series received heavy criticism as being racially offensive as it was being made. This caused the series' release date to be pushed back from May 1980 to October, and some changes to be made to the script, including one scene where slaves freed in a will instead seemed to want to remain slaves.

The review of the final product were mixed, with the Associated Press calling it successful as a soap opera, "not uplifting, but nicely diverting"; the New York Times review was titled "Pure Corn Pone"; and The Washington Post review was decidedly negative, calling it an "idiotic, inept, cynically exploitative travesty."

The story is set in Georgia, and the production was filmed in Natchez, Mississippi including at the Melrose mansion. It centers on the Kendrick family, owners of Beulah Land, and those connected to the plantation by history and fate. The sweeping drama links the Kendricks with the Davises, owners of a neighboring plantation. The story covers the 45-year period from 1827 to 1872 from the heights of Beulah Land's splendor through its destruction during the American Civil War and to its rebuilding in the Reconstruction era.

All three parts were among the top 10 American prime time television shows for the week of October 6–12, 1980, when they first aired. Part III was the third-most watched program of the week with a 24.4 rating (19 million homes). Part II was sixth with a 23.2 rating (18 million homes), and Part I was seventh with a 22 rating (17.1 million homes).

== Premise ==
When two young sisters, Sarah (Lesley Ann Warren) and Lauretta (Meredith Baxter Birney), first visit Beulah Land with their guardian, Penelope (Martha Scott), the plantation is run by the stern hand of Deborah Kendrick (Hope Lange), a widow with a son, Leon (Paul Ryan Rudd), and a daughter, Selma (Madeline Stowe).

Sarah later marries Leon, while Lauretta – a flirt with an eye for adventure – elopes with an actor for a life upon the stage.

From the beginning, Sarah's real love and Leon's rival is the land itself. Upon Deborah's death, Sarah, a strong-willed woman, takes over the management of Beulah Land.

Early in her administration of the plantation, Sarah locks horns with the cruel, ambitious overseer, Roscoe Corlay (Paul Shenar). She will not have her slaves whipped, and is determined to run Beulah Land in an intelligent, humane manner.

As the years pass, Leon seeks affection from other women, and Sarah becomes ever more obsessed by the land. Only one man tempts her to forget her obsession – artist Casey Troy (Michael Sarazin). The start of the American Civil War and the arrival of General Sherman's troops shatter life at Beulah Land, but Sarah vows to rebuild the plantation from its own ashes.
