= Three Bites of the Apple =

1967 film

- Theatrical release poster by Ron Lesser
- Directed by: Alvin Ganzer
- Written by: George Wells
- Produced by: Alvin Ganzer
- Starring: David McCallum; Sylva Koscina; Tammy Grimes; Harvey Korman; Domenico Modugno; Avril Angers; Claude Aliotti; Freda Bamford; Arthur Hewlett; Alison Frazer; Cardew Robinson; Ann Lancaster; John Sharp; Maureen Pryor; Eddra Gale; Mirella Maravidi; Riccardo Garrone; Aldo Fabrizi
- Cinematography: Gábor Pogány
- Edited by: Norman Savage
- Music by: Eddy Lawrence Manson
- Distributed by: Metro-Goldwyn-Mayer
- Release date: May 24, 1967 (USA)
- Running time: 98 minutes
- Language: English

Three Bites of the Apple is a 1967 American romantic comedy film directed by Alvin Ganzer.

== Plot ==
Stanley Thrumm is a British tour guide. An unlikely night of successful casino gambling on the Italian Riviera leaves him wealthy but in a quandary. Carla Moretti, a beautiful bystander at the casino, tells him that he will have to declare taxes on the money. Carla recommends him to smuggle the money to Switzerland and establish a bank account there, but she intends to fleece Thrumm with the help of her ex-husband, a thief. She follows Stanley to Rome and joins his guided tour to seduce him.

After successfully obtaining the money, she has a crisis of conscience and decides to return it. Stanley takes the money and appears to leave on a train, but as the train leaves he is seen on the opposite platform. The couple reunite, and the film ends.

== Reception ==
As summarized by Michael Betzold, the "lightweight comedy" turns into a "long car chase with many comic diversions and a lot of Alpine scenery".

There also is a soundtrack album where David McCallum sings the theme song over the opening credits.

== Cast ==
- David McCallum as Stanley Thrumm
- Sylva Koscina as Carla Moretti
- Tammy Grimes as Angela Sparrow
- Harvey Korman as Harvey Tomlinson
- Domenico Modugno as Remo Romano
- Avril Angers as Gladys Tomlinson
- Claude Aliotti as Teddy Farnum
- Freda Bamford as Gussie Hagstrom
- Arthur Hewlett as Alfred Guffy
- Alison Frazer as Peg Farnum
- Cardew Robinson as Bernhard Hagstrom
- Ann Lancaster as Winifred Batterly
- John Sharp as Joe Batterly
- Maureen Pryor as Birdie Guffy
- Edra Gale as The Yodeler
- Mirella Maravidi as Francesca Bianchini
- Riccardo Garrone as Croupier
- Aldo Fabrizi as Dr. Manzoni

== See also ==
- List of American films of 1967
