= Suzee Pai =

American actress and model

- Born: Sue Francis Pai; August 8, 1962 (age 64); Toledo, Ohio, U.S.
- Occupations: Model, actress
- Years active: 1981–1993

Suzee Pai (born August 8, 1962) is an American actress and model who was the Penthouse Pet of the Month in January 1981.

== Early and personal life ==
Pai is of French-Chinese descent. She was a cheerleader for the Philadelphia Eagles.

== Career ==
=== Modeling ===
Born in Toledo, Ohio, Pai was a Penthouse Pet of the Month in 1981 and also appeared in a follow-up pictorial in June 1982. She was also featured in the annual Sex in the Cinema pictorial in Playboy magazine in November 1982 for the scene shot, but not used, in the movie First Blood. She also competed in the spokesmodel category of the 1980s Ed McMahon entertainment competition show Star Search in its second season.

=== Acting ===
Pai went on to appear in several feature films and television shows including the Burt Reynolds action film Sharky's Machine (1981), the Sylvester Stallone action film First Blood (1982), (Note: The scene with Pai was deleted, but is a bonus feature on the "Ultimate Edition" DVD) John Carpenter's Big Trouble in Little China (1986), Jakarta (1988), (Note: She is credited as Sue Francis Pai; the film had an Indonesian release, Jakarta (1988 film)) and The Cosby Show (1984). She had a reoccurring role in the NBC comedy-drama Tattingers (1988–1989).
