= Nancy Giles =

American actress and commentator

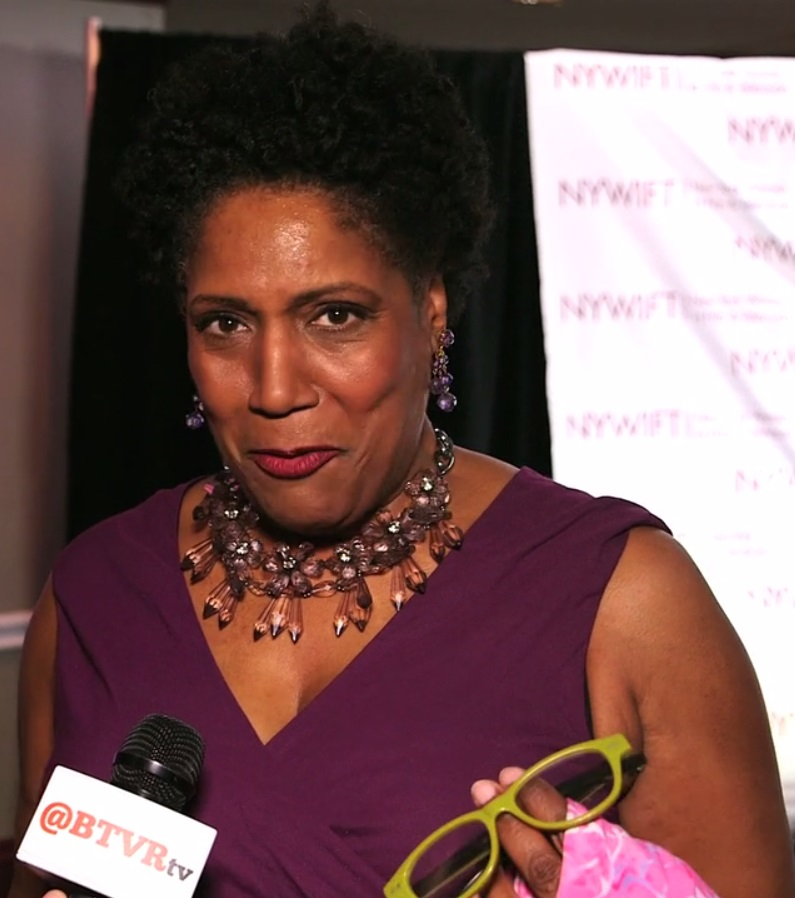
- Giles in 2015
- Education: Oberlin College
- Occupations: Commentator, actress
- Years active: 1986–present

Nancy Giles is an American actress and commentator, perhaps best known for her appearances in the series China Beach and on CBS News Sunday Morning.

== Early life ==
Nancy Giles is a 1981 graduate of Oberlin College.

== Career ==
Giles was a member of the Second City Touring Company in 1984. She is a writer and contributor to CBS News Sunday Morning. She was the announcer and co-host of Fox After Breakfast.

She starred in two ABC television series, playing Private Frankie Bunsen for three seasons on China Beach and hostile waitress Connie Morris on the sitcom Delta. She had guest roles on shows including The Jury, L.A. Law, Spin City, Law & Order, Dream On, and The Fresh Prince of Bel Air. She appeared in the 1985 Broadway production of the musical Mayor.

Giles and her CBS colleague, correspondent Erin Moriarty, have collaborated on two public-affairs radio series under the Giles and Moriarty banner, one for WPHT in Philadelphia and another for Greenstone Media. Both shows were produced at the facilities of the CBS Radio Network.

Giles gave the commencement address for the Ramapo College's graduating class of 2007 and Grinnell College's graduating class of 2014.

In 2017, Giles, along with CBS News colleague Nancy Wyatt, launched the popular podcast The Giles Files.

== Personal life ==
As of March 2020, Giles lives in Weehawken, New Jersey. During the COVID-19 pandemic in the United States, she self-isolated to avoid infection, and produced and starred in "A brisk walk with Nancy Giles", which documented her walk around the town, in particular up the inclined block on which Weehawken High School is located, and up Boulevard East, across from which the view of the Manhattan skyline prompted her to reflect on her parents' emigration to the area 70 years earlier.

== Partial filmography ==
=== Film ===
Year	Title	Role	Notes
1986	Off Beat	Celestine	
1988	Working Girl	Petty Marsh Secretary	
1997	States of Control	Volker	
2007	Joshua	Betsy Polschek	

=== Television ===
Year	Title	Role	Notes
1987	The Equalizer	Bailiff	Episode: "Suspicion of Innocence"
1988–1991	China Beach	Private Franklin "Frankie" Bunsen	53 episodes
1992–1993	Delta	Connie Morris	17 episodes
2000	PB&J Otter	Anna "Aunt Nanner" Otter (voice)	2 episodes
2003	Hey Joel	Z (voice)	4 episodes
2004	The Wrong Coast	Wife, Casting Director (voices)	Episode: "The Broken Teleprompter"
2004	Law & Order	Claudia Gaines	Episode: "Gov Love"

=== Videogames ===
Year	Title	Role
2000	Star Wars Episode I: Jedi Power Battles	Adi Gallia
2001	Smuggler's Run 2: Hostile Territory	Robot
2001	Grand Theft Auto III	Pedestrian
