= Hotel de Paree =

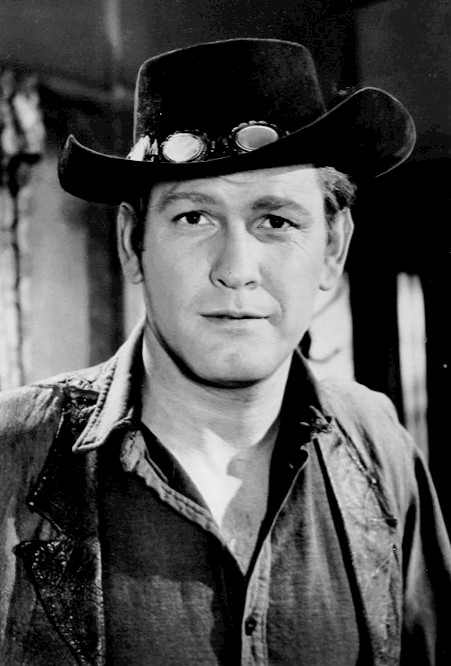
- Earl Holliman as Sundance.
- Starring: Earl Holliman; Jeanette Nolan; Judi Meredith; Strother Martin
- Theme music composer: Dimitri Tiomkin; Paul Francis Webster
- Composers: Dimitri Tiomkin (1.1); Rene Garriguenc (1.1, 1.15, 1.22); Leith Stevens (1.4); Lucien Moraweck (1.1, 1.7, 1.13); Alexander Courage (1.7); Wilbur Hatch (1.17); Fred Steiner (1.24); William Lava (one episode)
- Country of origin: United States
- No. of seasons: 1
- No. of episodes: 33

Production
- Producers: Stanley Rubin; Sam Rolfe
- Running time: 30 minutes
- Production company: CBS Productions

Original release
- Network: CBS
- Release: October 2, 1959 – June 3, 1960

Hotel de Paree is a Western television series starring Earl Holliman that aired thirty-three episodes on the CBS Friday evening from October 2, 1959, until September 23, 1960, under the alternate sponsorship of the Liggett & Myers company (L&M cigarettes) and Kellogg's.

== Format ==
Set in the 1870s, the show starred Holliman as Sundance, a gunfighter just released after 17 years in prison. In the first episode, he is in Georgetown, Colorado, where he kills the town villain and is then urged by the citizens to become the marshal. He accepts the job and also becomes a part owner of the Hotel de Paree, owned by two French women, Annette Deveraux, played by Jeanette Nolan, and her niece, Monique (Judi Meredith), relatives of the man whom he had earlier killed. Sundance wore a string of polished silver dollars in the band of his black Stetson, which often blinded his adversaries.

During the run of the series, Sundance dealt with assorted antagonists and maintained flirtations with both of the Deveraux women. Sundance also befriended a local shopkeeper, Aaron Donoger, played by veteran Western performer Strother Martin.

Guest stars included Warren Oates.

== Related publications ==
=== Paperback novel ===
In 1959, Gold Medal Books published Sundance by Richard Telfair, an original novel based on the series. An article in The New York Times said, "The book is cobbled together in much the same lackadaisical fashion as other Telfair Westerns."

=== Comic book ===
A single issue featuring an original story written by Gaylord Du Bois appeared in Dell's Four Color series (#1126).

== Episodes ==
No.	Title	Directed by	Written by	Original release date
1	"Sundance Returns"	Robert Aldrich	Sam Rolfe	October 2, 1959
2	"Juggernaut"	John Brahm	Ellis Kadison	October 9, 1959
3	"Vein of Ore"	Unknown	Unknown	October 16, 1959
4	"The High Cost of Justice"	Don Taylor	Jack Laird	October 23, 1959
5	"The Return of Monique"	Walter Grauman	Doris Gilbert	October 30, 1959
6	"A Rope Is For Hanging"	Unknown	Unknown	November 6, 1959
7	"A Fool and His Gold"	Unknown	Unknown	November 13, 1959
8	"The Only Wheel In Town"	Unknown	Unknown	November 20, 1959
9	"The Man Who Believed In Law"	Ida Lupino	Francis M. Cockrell	November 27, 1959
10	"Sundance and the Hostiles"	Unknown	Unknown	December 11, 1959
11	"Sundance and the Violent Siege"	Unknown	Unknown	December 18, 1959
12	"The Louis XIV Table"	Unknown	Unknown	December 25, 1959
13	"Sundance and the Blood Money"	Andrew V. McLaglen	Paul Savage	January 1, 1960
14	"Sundance and the Bare-Knuckled Fighters"	Unknown	Jack Jacobs	January 8, 1960
15	"Sundance and the Kid From Nowhere"	Unknown	Unknown	January 15, 1960
16	"Sundance Goes To Kill"	Alvin Ganzer	Herman Groves	January 22, 1960
17	"Sundance and the Boat Soldier"	Ida Lupino	Unknown	February 5, 1960
18	"Sundance and the Man In Room Seven"	Unknown	Unknown	February 12, 1960
19	"Hard Luck For Sundance"	Buzz Kulik	Jack Laird	February 19, 1960
20	"Sundance and the Greenhorn Trader"	Andrew V. McLaglen	Story by : William Gulick; Teleplay by : Jack Laird	February 26, 1960
21	"Sundance and Useless"	Unknown	Jack Jacobs	March 4, 1960
22	"Sundance and the Hero of Bloody Blue Creek"	Unknown	Unknown	March 11, 1960
23	"Sundance and the Marshal of Water's End"	Unknown	Unknown	March 18, 1960
24	"Sundance and the Black Widow"	John Rich	Gene Roddenberry	April 1, 1960
25	"Vengeance For Sundance"	Arthur Hiller	Robert Lees	April 8, 1960
26	"Sundance and the Man in the Shadows"	Unknown	Unknown	April 15, 1960
27	"Sundance and the Long Trek"	Andrew V. McLaglen	Jack Jacobs	April 22, 1960
28	"Bounty For Sundance"	Unknown	Unknown	April 29, 1960
29	"Sundance and the Good-Luck Coat"	Unknown	Unknown	May 6, 1960
30	"Sundance and the Cattlemen"	Unknown	Unknown	May 13, 1960
31	"Sundance and the Barren Soil"	Unknown	Unknown	May 20, 1960
32	"Sundance and the Fallen Sparrow"	Buzz Kulik	Jack Morton	May 27, 1960
33	"Sundance and the Delayed Gun"	Unknown	Unknown	June 3, 1960

== Production ==
Milton Krims, Stanley Rubin, and Sam Rolfe were the producers. The program was filmed at CBS Studio Center. On the evening of the series debut broadcast, October 2, 1959, star Earl Holliman also appeared an hour later in the premiere episode of The Twilight Zone, "Where Is Everybody?", which also aired on CBS. Its competition included The Man from Blackhawk on ABC and The Bell Telephone Hour on NBC. The program was broadcast in black-and-white on Fridays from 8:30 to 9 p.m. Eastern Time. It replaced Trackdown, and it was replaced by Dick Powell's Zane Grey Theatre.
