= Lonnie Coleman =

American novelist

William Lawrence "Lonnie" Coleman (1920–1982) was an American novelist and playwright best known for writing the Beulah Land trilogy. He was born on August 2, 1920, in Bartow, Georgia. He attended grade and high schools in various cities in Georgia, Florida, and Alabama and graduated from the University of Alabama in 1942 with a B.A. degree. From 1942 to 1946 he was in the U.S. Navy, spending most of his time at sea as gunnery officer and then as first lieutenant on a troop transport which took part in the invasions of North Africa, Sicily, Italy, France, and Okinawa and landed the first occupation troops in Kyushu, Japan.

He died from cancer in Candler General Hospital on August 13, 1982, in Savannah, Georgia, at age 62. His first novel was published in 1944. Coleman was an associate editor at Ladies' Home Journal 1947–50 and Collier's, 1951–55.

Coleman's 1959 novel Sam is considered a groundbreaking novel in American literature in its depiction of homosexuality and metropolitan gay life.

Coleman's book Beulah Land was a New York Times Best Seller in 1974 and earned a record-breaking $800,000 paperback rights contract. His novels Beulah Land and Look Away, Beulah Land were filmed in 1980 as the NBC miniseries Beulah Land starring Lesley Ann Warren, Michael Sarrazin. Meredith Baxter, and Don Johnson.

Coleman had three plays produced on Broadway, but none were successful. Jolly's Progress starred Eartha Kitt and Wendell Corey and ran for a week in December 1959. His other two plays closed after opening night. An unproduced play, Next of Kin, was adapted as the 1958 film Hot Spell which starred Shirley Booth and Anthony Quinn.

== Works ==
=== Novels ===
- Escape the Thunder (1944)
- Time Moving West (1947)
- The Sea is a Woman (1947)
- The Sound of Spanish Voices (1951)
- Clara (1952)
- Adam's Way (1953)
- Ship's Company (1955)
- The Southern Lady (1958)
- Sam (1959)
- King (1967)
- Beulah Land (1973)
- Orphan Jim (1975)
- Look Away, Beulah Land (1977)
- Legacy of Beulah Land (1981)
- Mark (1981)

=== Plays ===
- Jolly's Progress (1959)
- A Warm Body (1967)
- A Place For Polly (1970)
