= Hot Spell (film) =

1958 film by George Cukor, Daniel Mann

- Theatrical release poster
- Directed by: Daniel Mann; George Cukor (uncredited)
- Screenplay by: James Poe
- Based on: Next of Kin play by Lonnie Coleman (unproduced, based upon his novel of the same title)
- Produced by: Hal B. Wallis
- Starring: Shirley Booth; Anthony Quinn; Shirley MacLaine; Earl Holliman; Eileen Heckart
- Cinematography: Loyal Griggs
- Edited by: Warren Low
- Music by: Alex North
- Distributed by: Paramount Pictures
- Release date: June 1958
- Running time: 86 minutes
- Country: United States
- Language: English

Hot Spell is a 1958 American drama film directed by Daniel Mann, starring Shirley Booth and Anthony Quinn, and released by Paramount Pictures.

== Plot ==
Alma Duval is a Louisiana housewife planning a 45th birthday celebration for her husband John Henry, known to all as Jack, who is carrying on with a much younger woman named Ruby behind her back. Her adult children try to tell her this but she refuses to face reality and denies their claims.

During the birthday dinner, Jack picks an argument with eldest son, Buddy, mocking him about his business ideas and daring him to show some backbone. No one touches the birthday cake Alma made. After the dinner breaks up, he takes teenaged son Billy out to play pool and drink beer, trying to demonstrate to him how a man ought to behave. Jack confides in Billy that he is not content with his life and makes Billy cry. Jack tells Billy to stop crying and to act like a man.

Later in the evening, Alma shares some of the cake with her neighbor, Fan, while Fan tries to convince her to take up smoking and casual drinking to impress Jack.

While her father dallies with Ruby, his 19-year-old mistress, his daughter Virginia is told by her boyfriend Wyatt, (a medical student) on a passionate date that he cannot marry her because he needs to be with someone of greater position and wealth.

Throughout the movie Alma has been holding on to a belief that if she can just move the family back to New Paris, where she and Jack started out, everything will be all right, but Jack always prevaricates when the subject is raised, his unsentimental nature allowing him to remember it as it really was.

Alma slaps Jack after discovering his affair. He decides to leave her and move to Florida. While enroute Ruby forces him to drive the car too quickly. Just before it crashes into construction ' Detour ' signs, Jack yells Alma's pet name, " Mumma ", and he and Ruby are instantly killed.

Alma and her children return to New Paris to bury Jack. She realizes that people and places have changed and there is no happiness to be found there anymore.

The family goes home, with Alma still denying reality by deciding not to go on holiday as her children suggest because there'd be nobody to look after the children. A moment's pause, however, with the children looking on, makes her realise that that too, now, like New Paris, is more a part of the past than the truth.

== Cast ==
- Shirley Booth as Alma Duval
- Anthony Quinn as John Henry "Jack" Duval
- Shirley MacLaine as Virginia Duval
- Earl Holliman as John Henry "Buddy" Duval Jr.
- Eileen Heckart as Alma's friend Fan
- Clint Kimbrough as Billy Duval
- Warren Albert Stevens as Virginia's boyfriend Wyatt
- Jody Lawrance as Dora May
- Harlan Warde as Harry
- Valerie Allen as Ruby

== Production ==
The screenplay for Hot Spell was developed from an unproduced play by Lonnie Coleman, Next of Kin, purchased by producer Hal Wallis in June 1956. Production occurred from January 23 to early March 1957, with filming in Pasadena and Chatsworth, California.

== Release ==
Hot Spell had its premiere in New Orleans on May 21, 1958, and went into wide release in June.

Bosley Crowther of The New York Times gave it a moderately good review, singling out Booth, Quinn, and MacLaine for their portrayals.

== In pop culture ==
During the 2010 film Valentine's Day, Estelle and Edgar Paddington (played by MacLaine and Héctor Elizondo) reunite at a showing of Hot Spell at the Hollywood Forever Cemetery. Edgar points to MacLaine on the screen and tells Jason Morris (played by Topher Grace), "that's my trifecta".

== See also ==
- List of American films of 1958
