= The Desperate Mission (1969 film) =

1969 television film by Earl Bellamy

- Genre: Western
- Written by: Jack Guss; Richard Collins
- Directed by: Earl Bellamy
- Starring: Ricardo Montalbán
- Music by: Robert Drasnin; Lionel Newman
- Country of origin: United States
- Original language: English

Production
- Producers: David Silver; Aaron Rosenberg; Joseph Silver
- Cinematography: Jorge Stahl Jr.
- Editor: Russell F. Schoengarth
- Running time: 97 minutes
- Production companies: 20th Century Fox; Montalban Enterprises Production; 20th Century Fox Television

Original release
- Network: NBC
- Release: November 20, 1969

The Desperate Mission is a 1969 American made-for-television western film directed by Earl Bellamy. The production was a joint project of 20th Century Fox Television, Montalban Enterprises Production, and Twentieth Century Fox Film Corporation.

== Plot summary ==
The story is a fictionalization of the life of Joaquin Murrieta.

== Cast ==
- Ricardo Montalbán as Joaquin Murrieta (as Ricardo Montalban)
- Slim Pickens as Three-Finger Jack
- Roosevelt Grier as Morgan
- Jim McMullan as Arkansaw
- Earl Holliman as Shad Clay
- Ina Balin as Otilia Ruiz
- Robert J. Wilke as Gant
- Miriam Colon as Claudina, Otilia's Servant
- Anthony Caruso as Don Miguel Ruiz
- Eddra Gale as Dolores the Bartender
- Armando Silvestre as Diego Campos, Don Miguel's Man
- José Chávez as First Monk
- Ben Archibek as Frankie Gant
- Pancho Córdova as Father Augustine (as Francisco de Córdova)
- Charles Horvath as Yuma
- Allen Pinson as Corncracker
- Eldon Burke as Galvez
- Barbara Turner as The Farmer's Wife
