= The Biscuit Eater (1972 film) =

1972 film by Vincent McEveety

- Theatrical release poster
- Directed by: Vincent McEveety
- Screenplay by: Lawrence Edward Watkin
- Story by: James Street
- Produced by: Bill Anderson
- Starring: Earl Holliman; Pat Crowley; Lew Ayres; Godfrey Cambridge
- Cinematography: Richard A. Kelley
- Edited by: Ray de Leuw
- Music by: Robert F. Brunner
- Production company: Walt Disney Productions
- Distributed by: Buena Vista Distribution
- Release date: March 22, 1972 (US)
- Running time: 92 minutes
- Country: United States
- Language: English

The Biscuit Eater is a 1972 American drama film directed by Vincent McEveety and starring Earl Holliman, Pat Crowley, Lew Ayres, and Godfrey Cambridge. Based on a short story of the same name by James Street, it was released by Buena Vista Distribution. It is the last 'One Boy and his Animal' themed film made by Disney, as this subgenre eventually grew out of fashion. The 1972 film is a remake of a 1940 film starring Billy Lee as Lonnie.

== Plot ==
The story revolves around a German Wirehaired Pointer named Moreover who has a strong relationship with a boy named Lonnie (Johnny Whitaker). Moreover is given away to Willie Dorsey (Godfrey Cambridge), a gas station clerk, but Lonnie and his best friend Text gain possession of the dog through somewhat deceitful bargaining, securing the reluctant respect of Willie. The boys train Moreover to be a prize-winning bird dog, entering him in a field trial.

The dog was initially raised by Lonnie's father, Harvey McNeil, who is an award-winning dog-trainer. Although Lonnie viewed Moreover as a personal pet and a close friend, his father considered the dog to be untrainable and a lackluster hunting dog due to his predilection to eat chicken eggs and biscuits instead of learning to train to be a bird dog. As he did not wish for Moreover to negatively influence the other hunting dogs on the farm, Harvey gifts the dog to Willie, who had previously asked Harvey for a dog to keep as a companion. Lonnie, distraught over the loss of his pet, conspires with his best friend, Text, to trick Willie, who infamously loves to engage in various trades with local individuals, to regain possession of the dog by having Willie trade them the dog for assistance with manual labor. Text, who lives on a farm, takes several eggs from his family's chicken coop to Willie's gas station and gives them to Moreover. Willie, who had initially been hesitant to take possession of the dog due to its reputation of eating eggs, finds Moreover eating the eggs, which he believes to be from his personal stash of eggs, and becomes irate at the dog's behavior. Lonnie and Text are overjoyed that their plan to deceive Willie worked and quickly offer to trade the dog in return for helping Willie carry firewood to his home. Willie agrees to the trade, and the boys decide to secretly train the dog together to become a prize-winning bird dog. Much to the chagrin of Lonnie's father, Lonnie and Text decide to enter Moreover in the state championship field trial. Moreover does well and an incident makes the boys think that Lonnie's father (Earl Holliman) will lose his dog training job if his dog, last year's champion SilverBelle, loses to their dark horse entry.

== Cast ==
- Earl Holliman as Harve McNeil
- Pat Crowley as Mary Lee McNeil
- Lew Ayres as Mr. Ames
- Godfrey Cambridge as Mr. Dorsey
- Beah Richards as Charity Tomlin
- Clifton James as Mr. Eben
- Johnny Whitaker as Lonnie McNeil
- George Spell as Text Tomlin
- Mantan Moreland as Waiter
- Rolph Van Wolfgang as Moreover

== Music ==
The film's score was written by Robert F. Brunner. The film features one original song, "Moreover and Me," written and sung by Shane Tatum. The song plays during the film's opening credits and is reprised at the film's conclusion.

== Home media ==
The Biscuit Eater was released on DVD in the United States by Walt Disney Home Video on May 21, 2002. On November 12, 2019, Disney made The Biscuit Eater available for streaming as part of the launch line-up of its Disney+ service.

== Reception ==
A review in Variety faulted a "weak screenplay" but found that Whitaker and Spell "display confidence and surety, and delineate clear characterizations that make almost plausible the sugary events." Kevin Thomas of the Los Angeles Times called it "a fine Disney family film" with "a first-rate cast." Gene Siskel of the Chicago Tribune gave the film one star out of four and asked, "What we want to know is, where in the world of space and time is 'The Biscuit Eater' supposed to take place? My preliminary guess is just outside of Never-Never Land sometime between 1850 and 1950 ... I acknowledge that the Disney people prefer to keep their films timeless to permit their perpetual release without being dated. But this time the temporal confusion is downright insulting."

== See also ==
- List of American films of 1972
