= The Rainmaker (1956 film) =

1956 film by Joseph Anthony

- Film poster
- Directed by: Joseph Anthony
- Screenplay by: N. Richard Nash
- Based on: The Rainmaker (1954 play) by N. Richard Nash
- Produced by: Hal B. Wallis
- Starring: Burt Lancaster; Katharine Hepburn; Wendell Corey; Lloyd Bridges; Earl Holliman; Cameron Prud'Homme
- Cinematography: Charles Lang
- Edited by: Warren Low
- Music by: Alex North
- Production company: Hal Wallis Productions
- Distributed by: Paramount Pictures
- Release date: December 13, 1956
- Running time: 121 minutes
- Country: United States
- Language: English
- Box office: $2.1 million (US)

The Rainmaker is a 1956 American romantic Western film directed by Joseph Anthony, and adapted by N. Richard Nash from his 1954 play. It stars Burt Lancaster, Katharine Hepburn, Wendell Corey, Lloyd Bridges and Earl Holliman. The film tells the story of a middle-aged woman (Hepburn), suffering from unrequited love for the local town sheriff; however, she falls for a con man (Lancaster) who comes to town with the promise that he can make it rain. The play and film are inspired by the life of Charles Hatfield.

The film was released by Paramount Pictures on December 13, 1956, and was a critical success. Hepburn received Academy Award, BAFTA Award, and Golden Globe nominations for her performance; Alex North's score also received an Oscar nomination. Earl Holliman won a Golden Globe Award for Best Supporting Actor for his role.

== Plot ==
During the Depression era in the Midwest, con man Bill Starbuck acts as a rainmaker, but is chased out of town after town. One day, he arrives in a drought-ridden rural town in Kansas and shows up at the door of spinsterish Lizzie Curry and the rest of the Curry clan. Lizzie keeps house for her father, H.C., and two brothers on the family cattle ranch. As their farm languishes under the devastating drought, Lizzie's family worries about her marriage prospects more than about their dying cattle. Prior to Starbuck's arrival, Lizzie was expecting Sheriff File, for whom she harbors a secret yen, though he declined the family's invitation to dinner. Starbuck promises to bring rain in exchange for money. Against Lizzie's protests, H.C. goes for the deal out of desperation for rain even though he thinks Starbuck is a con. Starbuck is exposed, but the Curry clan stands up for him, leading to both Starbuck and File finally declaring for Lizzie. In the end, Lizzie gets her man, and it rains.

== Cast ==
- Burt Lancaster as Bill Starbuck
- Katharine Hepburn as Lizzie Curry
- Wendell Corey as Deputy Sheriff J. S. File
- Lloyd Bridges as Noah Curry
- Earl Holliman as Jim Curry
- Cameron Prud'Homme as H. C. Curry
- Wallace Ford as Sheriff Howard Thomas
- Yvonne Lime as Snookie Maguire

== Background ==
The original Broadway production of The Rainmaker opened at the Cort Theatre on October 28, 1954, running for 125 performances. It was also directed by Joseph Anthony, and starred Darren McGavin as Starbuck, Geraldine Page as Lizzie, and Albert Salmi as Jim. The only actor to appear in both the stage and film version was Cameron Prud'Homme (as Lizzie's father H.C.).

=== Casting ===
Elvis Presley screen-tested for the role of Jim Curry. Had he been cast, The Rainmaker would've been his film debut. Reportedly, his casting was vetoed by his manager Colonel Tom Parker.

William Holden was originally cast as Bill Starbuck, but backed out before filming started. Burt Lancaster lobbied producer Hal B. Wallis for the role, agreeing to star in Gunfight at the O.K. Corral if he was cast. Katharine Hepburn further vouched for Lancaster, after being impressed by his performance in The Rose Tattoo.

=== Filming ===
Shooting took place at the Paramount studio backlot in Los Angeles, with some exterior location filming in Kanab, Utah.

== Reception ==
=== Critical response ===
The review aggregator website Rotten Tomatoes gives the film an approval rating of 80% based on 5 reviews.

=== Awards and nominations ===
Award	Category	Nominee(s)	Result	Ref.
Academy Awards	Best Actress	Katharine Hepburn	Nominated	
Academy Awards	Best Music Score of a Dramatic or Comedy Picture	Alex North	Nominated	
British Academy Film Awards	Best Foreign Actress	Katharine Hepburn	Nominated	
Golden Globe Awards	Best Motion Picture – Drama		Nominated	
Golden Globe Awards	Best Actor in a Motion Picture – Drama	Burt Lancaster	Nominated	
Golden Globe Awards	Best Actress in a Motion Picture – Drama	Katharine Hepburn	Nominated	
Golden Globe Awards	Best Supporting Actor – Motion Picture	Earl Holliman	Won	
Writers Guild of America Awards	Best Written American Drama	N. Richard Nash	Nominated	

== Remakes ==
The Rainmaker has been remade twice: the first time as a television film of the same name in 1982 directed by John Frankenheimer; the second time in Hindi as Thodasa Roomani Ho Jayen in 1990.

== See also ==
- List of American films of 1956
