= Sharky's Machine =

1981 film by Burt Reynolds

- Theatrical release poster
- Directed by: Burt Reynolds
- Screenplay by: Gerald Di Pego
- Based on: Sharky's Machine (1978 novel) by William Diehl
- Produced by: Hank Moonjean
- Starring: Burt Reynolds; Vittorio Gassman; Brian Keith; Charles Durning; Earl Holliman; Bernie Casey; Henry Silva; Darryl Hickman; Richard Libertini; Rachel Ward
- Cinematography: William A. Fraker
- Edited by: William D. Gordean; Dennis Virkler
- Music by: Doc Severinsen; Al Capps
- Production company: Deliverance Productions
- Distributed by: Orion Pictures (U.S.); Warner Bros. (worldwide)
- Release date: December 18, 1981
- Running time: 122 minutes
- Country: United States
- Language: English
- Budget: $17.5 million
- Box office: $35.6 million

Sharky's Machine is a 1981 American neo-noir action thriller film directed by Burt Reynolds, who stars in the title role, along with Rachel Ward, Vittorio Gassman, Brian Keith, Charles Durning, Earl Holliman, Bernie Casey and Henry Silva. It is based on the 1978 novel by William Diehl, with a screenplay by Gerald Di Pego. In the film, Atlanta police Sergeant Tom Sharky (Reynolds) is reassigned to the vice squad, where he investigates a high-priced prostitute (Ward) with ties to political and mob figures.

The film was released by Warner Bros. on December 18, 1981. It received mostly positive reviews from critics, and was a moderate commercial success. Rachel Ward's performance earned her a Golden Globe nomination for New Star of the Year – Actress.

== Plot ==
Tom Sharky, a narcotics sergeant for the Atlanta Police Department, is working on a transaction with drug dealer Highball. Smiley, another member of the force, shows up unexpectedly during the sting, causing the drug dealer to run and Sharky to give chase, ultimately shooting the suspect on a MARTA bus, after wounding of the bus driver and a passenger. In the aftermath, Sharky is demoted to the vice squad, which is considered the least desirable assignment in the police department.

In the depths of the vice-squad division, led by Friscoe, the arrest of small-time hooker Mabel results in the accidental discovery of a high-class prostitution ring that includes a beautiful escort named Dominoe, who charges $1,000 a night. Sharky and his new partners begin a surveillance of her apartment and discover that Dominoe is having a relationship with Donald Hotchkins, a leading gubernatorial candidate.

With a team of downtrodden fellow investigators that includes veteran Papa, Arch, and surveillance man Nosh, referred to by Friscoe sarcastically as Sharky's "machine", he sets out to find where the trail leads. During one stakeout Dominoe is seen having a romantic rendezvous with Hotchkins, who promises her a house to live in after he gets elected. During one of the other stakeouts, a mysterious crime kingpin known as Victor comes to the apartment. He has been controlling her life since she was a young girl, but now with lasting happiness in her future, she wants out. Victor seemingly agrees, but forces her to have sex with him one last time.

Sharky watches the affair from the rented apartment and is disgusted with what he sees, as he has privately been developing feelings for her while viewing her and listening to the bugged conversations. He begins to dream of a fantasy relationship with her. The next day, Sharky witnesses Dominoe being killed by a shotgun blast through her front door, disfiguring her face beyond recognition. The assassin, known as Billy Score, is a drug addict and Victor's younger brother. He answers to Victor, as does Hotchkins, who himself is a powerless political stooge under Victor's rule.

When Sharky walks around Dominoe's apartment, to his surprise she suddenly turns up there alive, and when asked where her friend Tiffany is, who Dominoe would lend her apartment from time to time, Sharky comes to the realization that Billy has shot the wrong woman. Meanwhile, Nosh telephones Sharky telling him that most of the surveillance tapes have disappeared from the police station, leaving the pair wondering if the investigation has been compromised. Realizing it is a matter of time before they both end up dead, Sharky takes a reluctant Dominoe to his childhood home in the West End neighborhood. Sharky attempts to obtain information about Victor from Dominoe, even going as far as assaulting her in frustration when she resists, but he becomes disgusted with himself and lets her be as before.

Still in hiding, Dominoe finds photos of herself from the stakeouts and confronts Sharky about it. His obsession now exposed, the two begin to talk and learn about each other, from Sharky buying his family home several years prior and fixing it up, to Dominoe finally giving Sharky the story about her background, how she was "discovered" by Victor when she was 12 and has been a sexual pawn of his ever since. Sharky confronts Victor at his penthouse apartment in the Westin Peachtree Plaza and vows to bring him to justice. Victor smugly tells him that Dominoe is dead and cannot testify against him and is stunned to be told by Sharky that she is still alive.

While attempting to find Nosh at his home, two men spring an attack on Sharky, and he is knocked out cold. He awakens on a boat, and is shocked to see Detective Smiley, who is determined to find out about Dominoe's location. Smiley, it turns out, is working for Victor. He tells Sharky how he ordered the murders of his old narcotics division superior Joe "JoJo" Tipps and Nosh. Billy Score's henchmen killed Tipps when he threatened to give the district attorney certain facts about Sharky's latest moves. When Sharky still refuses to squeal, Smiley orders the hitmen from the earlier ambush to cut off two of his fingers. Sharky then manages to escape after killing Smiley and the hitmen. Later Hotchkins, at a political rally celebrating his electoral win, catches glimpses of both Dominoe and Sharky, to the candidate's considerable shock. Hotchkins is arrested and taken into custody, and Victor finds out about it on the evening newscasts.

Billy Score, in a drugged and agitated state, shoots and kills Victor after the two bicker. Almost immediately Sharky and other police officers arrive at the penthouse apartment in an attempt to catch Billy. He is pursued through the upper floors of the Westin, where like a ghostly apparition he appears and disappears, killing Papa and seriously wounding Arch in a dual shootout in which Billy is seriously wounded but is able to get back up again. Billy flees to a section of the building that is under construction where Sharky ultimately finds him. Vowing to kill himself rather than give the police the satisfaction Billy is ultimately gunned down by Sharky, crashes through a window and plummets to his death on the street.

In the end, Sharky is seen pushing Dominoe on a tire swing at his childhood home, where the two look very happy together.

== Cast ==
- Burt Reynolds as Det. Sergeant Tom Sharky
- Charles Durning as Lt. Friscoe
- Vittorio Gassman as Albert Scorelli / Victor D'Anton
- Brian Keith as Det. "Papa" Marindo
- Bernie Casey as Det. Arch Driscoll
- Rachel Ward as Dominoe
- Darryl Hickman as Det. Smiley
- Earl Holliman as Donald Hotchkins
- Henry Silva as Carlo "Billy Score" Scorelli
- Richard Libertini as Nosh
- John Fiedler as Barrett
- Hari Rhodes as "Highball"
- Joseph Mascolo as Det. Joe "Jo-Jo" Tipps
- Carol Locatell as Mabel
- Tony King as "Kitten" Holmes
- James O'Connell as "Twigs"
- Suzee Pai as Siakwan
- Dan Inosanto as Paco, 1st Chin
- Weaver Levy as 2nd Chin
- Aarika Wells as Tiffany
- May Keller as May
- Sheryl Kilby as Lisa
- Val Avery as Manny
- William Diehl as Percy Sinclair
- El Mongol as Mongol
- J. Don Ferguson as Rally Emcee
- Bill Nunn as Kitten's Bouncer (uncredited)

== Original novel ==
The film was based on a novel by William Diehl, a former journalist and producer, which was published in 1978. It was Diehl's first novel, written when Diehl was 53 years old and financially destitute. It sold to Delacorte Press for $156,000 on the basis of a six-page outline and 120 pages. "It's a total fantasy come true", said Diehl.

The Washington Post thought that the novel "may make a decent movie" but "it tries to be three or four novels at once and manages to be none of them". The book did not become a best seller in hardback but did in paperback.

== Production ==
=== Development ===
Film rights were bought prior to publication by the newly formed Orion Pictures in 1978 for $400,000. Burt Reynolds was to star and possibly direct.

"Sidney Sheldon sent me the novel, and I found it highly cinematic", said Reynolds.

Reynolds said that he was attracted to the film because it was similar to the classic 1944 film noir Laura, his favorite movie. He talked to John Boorman about directing, but Boorman was too busy on Excalibur and suggested that Reynolds direct it himself.

"I figured it was time to get away from Smokey", Reynolds said. "I'd been doing a lot of comedy in recent years, and people had forgotten about Deliverance".

=== Casting ===
Reynolds says the "key" to the cast was getting Brian Keith to play a role. "After that it was easy to get actors".

Fashion model Rachel Ward was cast in the female lead after being spotted in Time as "the face of the 80s". She was cast six days before filming. Reynolds:

That was like starting King Kong without the gorilla. I kept saying, 'She'll turn up, she'll turn up.' Then I saw Time magazine... I wanted an actress who could speak Italian and French, and since she was English, I thought she might have the kind of foreign attitude that I was seeking. When she came in my office and I heard her voice, deep like Bacall's, I thought she would be ideal. But Catherine Deneuve once told me that to judge how a beautiful woman will appear on the screen you must look through the camera and see if it has a love affair with her. I picked up a viewfinder and looked at Rachel. I damn near fell over.

The film was Ward's breakout role, her only prior film appearance has been in the slasher film Night School (released the same year). Both Stephanie Beacham and Clio Goldsmith had been considered for the role before she was cast. "She's going to be a big star," said Reynolds. "She just jumps off the screen. She has the kind of sensuous appeal that Ava Gardner had."

=== Filming ===
Filming took place in Atlanta from January to March 1981. "I liked the idea of working in Atlanta, where I've spent a lot of time", said Reynolds. "I made Deliverance, Smokey, The Longest Yard and Gator, my first film as a director, all in Georgia".

At 220 feet, the stunt from Atlanta's Hyatt Regency Hotel (doubling for the Westin Peachtree Plaza) still stands as the highest free-fall stunt ever performed from a building for a commercially released film. The stuntman was Dar Robinson. Despite it being a record-setting fall, only the beginning of the stunt, as he goes through the window, was used in the film. A dummy was used for the outside wide shot of the fall beside the skyscraper.

Diehl, who was 50 when he wrote the novel, saw the movie shot on location in and around his hometown of Atlanta, and makes a cameo appearance in the final film.

Reynolds talked about his directing:

Most directors cast actors on the basis of what they've seen before, and they don't want surprises; they want the actor to give another version of what he's already done. I try to do the opposite. I tell the actors, 'You've done that before, so let's go for something else.' On this picture I did with my actors what I always wanted other directors to do with me, which is to say, 'O.K., I have what I want, now you do what you want.' Sometimes magical things happen that way. I had lots of ideas, but I was open to any ideas the actors had. There really was a wonderful feeling of camaraderie.

"In my picture the good guys win and the bad guys, the dopers, lose", said Reynolds. "That's important to me: I don't like dopers. I get mad as hell when I hear that studios are coddling actors who are always high on cocaine". Reynolds himself battled addiction to painkillers through the 80's and 90's.

== Release ==
Sharky's Machine was released in theatres in the United States by Orion Pictures on December 18, 1981. Internationally, the film was distributed by Warner Bros.

=== Home media ===
Sharky's Machine was released on DVD on October 20, 1998, by Warner Home Video. It was released Blu-ray on April 7, 2015, by Warner Home Video.

== Reception ==
=== Box office ===
The film was considered a moderate hit on initial release, making $35.6 million in North America.

=== Critical reception ===
The film received mostly positive reviews from critics. As of April 2022, review aggregator Rotten Tomatoes reports that 83% of 23 critics have given the film a positive review, with an average rating of 6.4 out of 10.

Roger Ebert gave the film three out of four stars, writing that "Sharky's Machine contains all of the ingredients of a tough, violent, cynical big-city cop movie, but what makes it intriguing is the way that Burt Reynolds ... plays against those conventions.... The result of his ambition and restraint is a movie much more interesting than most cop thrillers". Janet Maslin wrote in The New York Times: "Burt Reynolds establishes himself as yet another movie star who is as valuable behind the camera as he is in front of it. Mr. Reynolds's third and best directorial effort ... is an unexpectedly accomplished cop thriller". Variety noted: "Directing himself in Sharky's Machine, Burt Reynolds has combined his own macho personality with what's popularly called mindless violence to come up with a seemingly guaranteed winner. Borrowing from buddy Clint Eastwood, Reynolds has already dubbed this one Dirty Harry Goes to Atlanta and that's about as good a description as any".

Gene Siskel of the Chicago Tribune gave the film two-and-a-half stars out of four and lamented its "unfortunate split personality," explaining: "Obviously, Reynolds decided to hedge his bets in the film and play some of it for laughs. That's too bad, because although Sharky's Machine is miles ahead of such recent Reynolds' trash as Smokey and the Bandit II and The Cannonball Run, what Reynolds could use most in his career is a solid dramatic role in which he didn't leer at the audience". Sheila Benson of the Los Angeles Times called the film "a brutal, fast-moving cop action film about love, corruption and politics in Atlanta ... Before the picture falls into lunatic excess in its last quarter, its best moments happen between Sharky and his team members, especially his wiretap expert played with impeccable timing by Richard Libertini". Gary Arnold of The Washington Post wrote: "Sharky's Machine should become the runaway box-office smash of the season, unless a vast moviegoing public has suddenly sworn off glossy, viciously provocative diversion. Directing his own starring vehicle, that sly boots Burt Reynolds gives the audience a shamelessly lurid but stylish going-over, while putting a clever new wrinkle or two on his own status".

=== Awards and nominations ===
Ceremony	Category	Nominee	Result	Ref.
39th Golden Globes	New Star of the Year – Actress	Rachel Ward	Nominated	

== Soundtrack ==
The opening credits use the 1979 hit song "Street Life", originally performed by The Crusaders with vocalist Randy Crawford. The recording in the film is a newer version (song length ~4:17) orchestrated by Doc Severinsen, inviting Crawford to reprise her vocal and who composed the original score, as well. This version is a much more powerful and faster-paced version with a full orchestra, and it was the one that Quentin Tarantino included in Jackie Brown (1997) (Crawford is given the only credit on the song title).

As was standard for the time, little of Severinsen's score is included on the album, with many of his contributions being edited for the album tracks and several, like his version of "My Funny Valentine", being omitted altogether.

The soundtrack album has been re-released after more than 30 years on the Varèse Sarabande label.

The Sharky's Machine original motion picture soundtrack contained these tracks:

1. "Street Life" - Randy Crawford
2. "Dope Bust" - Flora Purim and Buddy De Franco
3. "Route 66" - The Manhattan Transfer
4. "My Funny Valentine" - Chet Baker
5. "High Energy" - Doc Severinsen
6. "Love Theme From Sharky's Machine" - Sarah Vaughan
7. "8 To 5 I Lose" - Joe Williams
8. "My Funny Valentine" - Julie London
9. "Sexercise" - Doc Severinsen
10. "Let's Keep Dancing" - Peggy Lee
11. "Sharky's Theme" - Eddie Harris
12. "Before You" - Sarah Vaughan and Joe Williams

== In popular culture ==
In the animated television series The Venture Bros episode "Careers in Science" (Season 1, Episode 2), Sharky's Machine is the feature film during the movie night massacre.

Sharkey's Machine, the debut album of American musician Sharkey, is named after the film.
