= Delta (American TV series) =

American sitcom television series

- Created by: Miriam Trogdon
- Directed by: Andy Cadiff; James Widdoes
- Starring: Delta Burke; Bill Engvall; Beth Grant; Earl Holliman; Gigi Rice; Nancy Giles
- Opening theme: "Climb That Mountain High" by Reba McEntire
- Country of origin: United States
- Original language: English
- No. of seasons: 1
- No. of episodes: 17

Production
- Executive producers: Barry Kemp; Delta Burke
- Producers: Jay Kleckner; Lisa Albert
- Production locations: Universal Studios, Universal City, California
- Running time: 22 minutes
- Production companies: Perseverance Inc. Bungalow 78 Productions; Universal Television

Original release
- Network: ABC
- Release: September 15, 1992 – August 25, 1993

Delta is an American sitcom television series starring Delta Burke that aired on ABC from September 15, 1992, to August 25, 1993. It was a new starring vehicle for Burke, as her return to television following her dismissal from the CBS sitcom Designing Women in the spring of 1991.

== Synopsis ==
Burke portrays Delta Bishop, a young woman with dreams of writing and singing country music. She became a hairstylist at Mona's House of Hair, married Charlie Bishop and thought she had found happiness. After eight years of marriage, she became restless: she was eager to follow in the footsteps of her childhood idol, Patsy Cline, and become a country music star. She quits her job, leaves her husband and friends behind, and travels to Nashville, Tennessee. There, she finds an apartment over the garage of a home owned by her cousin, Lavonne Overton (Gigi Rice), and her husband, Buck (Bill Engvall). She also finds a job waiting tables at The Green Lantern, a local bar that hosts an amateur night which she believes that if she could sing her songs there, it could jumpstart her career.

Burke, most popular for her role as Suzanne Sugarbaker on Designing Women, reportedly utilized her own singing talents for the role of Bishop, and dyed her familiar brunette hair blonde to play the role. The theme song was "Climb That Mountain High" by Reba McEntire which was not a charted single; the tune was featured on Reba's 1990 MCA album Rumor Has It.

== Cast ==
- Delta Burke as Delta Bishop
- Earl Holliman as Darden Towe
- Beth Grant as Thelma Wainwright
- Nancy Giles as Connie Morris
- Bill Engvall as Buck Overton
- Gigi Rice as Lavonne Overton
- Joe Urla as Sandy Scott

== Episodes ==
No.	Title	Directed by	Written by	Original release date	Prod. code	Viewers (millions)
1	"Climb That Mountain"	Andy Cadiff	Miriam Trogdon	September 15, 1992	68409	29.7
Delta leaves her husband and moves to Nashville, taking a job waiting tables at The Green Lantern Bar where she signs up for amateur night.
2	"Delta Doesn't Get Discovered"	Andy Cadiff	Lisa Albert	September 17, 1992	68402	13.9
Delta would kill for an audition with a record producer and he believes it when she punctuates her plea with scissors.
3	"Sweet Dreams"	Andy Cadiff	Miriam Trogdon	September 24, 1992	68401	13.4
Although Delta hasn't slept for days, her insomnia wreaks havoc at work and during an audition.
4	"Shall We Dance?"	Andy Cadiff	Eric Horsted	October 1, 1992	68405	11.9
Delta plans a surprise birthday party for Lavonne, but Buck tries to call it off because he's embarrassed: he admits to Delta that he can't dance.
5	"How Much Is That Darden in the Window?"	Andy Cadiff	Mark Ganzel	October 8, 1992	68413	13.1
Delta urges Darden into participating in a charity bachelor auction with disastrous consequences for both of them.
6	"White Women Can't Jump Either"	Andy Cadiff	Miriam Trogdon, Mark Ganzel, Ken Estin	October 15, 1992	68414	12.9
Delta and Connie compete against Buck and Deke in a basketball game.
7	"The Bad Word"	Andy Cadiff	Eric Horsted	October 22, 1992	68403	12.8
Delta suspects there may be strings attached when country star Jimmy Word (John Schneider) offers her a job as a backup singer.
8	"First Time Again"	Andy Cadiff	Ken Estin	October 29, 1992	68406	13.1
Delta goes on her first date since leaving her husband with Eugene Dorr, a now successful nerdy ex-classmate who hires Willie Nelson to sing for them.
9	"The Cabin and the Credit Card"	Andy Cadiff	Cassandra Clark, Deborah Pearl	November 12, 1992	68411	11.4
Darden wants to buy a cabin and Delta wants a credit card, so they pretend to be married.
10	"Our D-I-V-O-R-C-E"	Andy Cadiff	Miriam Trogdon	December 3, 1992	68416	10.4
Charlie won't sign the divorce papers until she returns the only items she took: her wedding ring and the car.
11	"A Christmas Tale"	Andy Cadiff	Ken Estin	December 17, 1992	68417	11.2
When Darden's daughter, Taliam, visits for Christmas, Delta realizes that her perfect image is only a façade.
12	"The Agent"	James Widdoes	Mark Ganzel	April 6, 1993	68418	21.2
Desperate for a break, Delta bends the truth to impress L.A. musical agent Sandy Scott to get him into The Green Lantern to hear her sing.
13	"Mom Comes to Town"	James Widdoes	Mark Ganzel, Robin Schiff	April 13, 1993	68421	24.0
Delta's mother visits for a week and pressures her into sharing an apartment. Elizabeth Wilson and Joe Urla join the main cast.
14	"Amateur Night"	James Widdoes	Brad Johnson, Robin Schiff	April 20, 1993	68422	21.1
Delta competes with Sandy's secretary Tess at the amateur-night contest.
15	"Red Hot Mama"	James Widdoes	Susan Sebastian, Jennie Ayers	April 27, 1993	68420	18.2
Delta has mixed feelings about her mother dating Sandy's boss; Buck is the new chef at The Green Lantern.
16	"Roadtrip"	Andy Cadiff	Ian Gurvitz	July 28, 1993	68415	13.8
Delta upsets Thelma and Lavonne's plans to see Tanya Tucker's concert in Washington, D.C. and insists on a detour to visit Patsy Cline's grave.
17	"Delta's Little Dilemma"	James Widdoes	Brad Johnson, Robin Schiff	August 25, 1993	68424	16.1
Delta falls for Wes, a good-looking guitarist at The Green Lantern; Sandy directs a TV commercial for the bar.

== Production ==
In early 1992, ABC had commissioned a pilot order of a new sitcom that starred Delta Burke, from Barry Kemp and Universal Television, the producing team behind Coach. The show was given a series order in May 1992, airing on Thursday nights. It was given a back end order in October 1992. The series was cancelled in May 1993 due to low ratings.

== Broadcast history ==
The sitcom premiered September 15, 1992, to healthy ratings following Roseanne. It then moved to Thursday nights opposite FOX's The Simpsons, and ratings began to sink. It was pulled from the schedule in December 1992 and returned to ABC the following spring 1993 for six episodes before finally being canceled. In an attempt to infuse ratings, the show was moved back to Tuesdays after Roseanne, two new characters introduced, and Burke brought her brunette hair back that spring (including a rejig of the credits), in the sake of familiarity, but these changes proved to be too little, too late. It would rank 72nd for the season with an average 9.6 rating.

Dates	Broadcast time (ET)
September 15, 1992	Tuesday 9:30-10:00 pm
September 17, 1992 - December 17, 1992	Thursday 8:00-8:30 pm
April 6, 1993 - April 27, 1993	Tuesday 9:30-10:00 pm
July 28, 1993 - August 25, 1993	Wednesday 9:30-10:00 pm

== Award nominations ==
Earl Holliman was nominated for Best Performance by an Actor in a Supporting Role in a Series, Miniseries or Television Film at the 50th Golden Globe Awards in 1992.
