= Earl Holliman =

American actor (1928–2024)

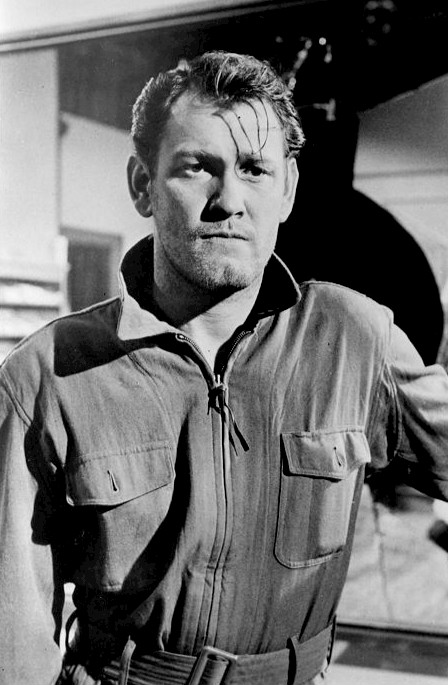
- Holliman in The Twilight Zone pilot episode "Where Is Everybody", 1959
- Born: Henry Earl Holliman; September 11, 1928; Delhi, Louisiana, U.S.
- Died: November 25, 2024 (aged 96); Los Angeles, California, U.S.
- Resting place: Oakwood Memorial Park Cemetery, Chatsworth, California, U.S.
- Education: Pasadena Playhouse; University of California, Los Angeles
- Occupations: Actor; activist; singer
- Years active: 1953–2000
- Spouse: Craig Curtis

Henry Earl Holliman (September 11, 1928 – November 25, 2024) was an American actor, animal rights activist, and singer known for his many character roles in films, mostly Westerns and dramas, in the 1950s and 1960s. He won a Golden Globe Award for the film The Rainmaker (1956) and portrayed Sergeant Bill Crowley on the television police drama Police Woman throughout its 1974 to 1978 run.

Holliman also had important roles in major films such as Broken Lance (1954), The Bridges at Toko-Ri (1954), The Big Combo (1955), I Died a Thousand Times (1955), Forbidden Planet (1956), Giant (1956), Hot Spell (1958), Anzio (1968), The Desperate Mission (1969), The Biscuit Eater (1972), Sharky's Machine (1981), and Gunsmoke: Return to Dodge (1987). He also had several notable television appearances in The Twilight Zone, Hotel de Paree, The Thorn Birds, Gunsmoke, Murder, She Wrote, and Caroline in the City.

From 1958 to 1963, Holliman also performed as a singer and had record deals with such notable recording studios as Capitol Records, Prep, and HiFi. Aside from acting, Holliman was also an activist and was an honorary chairman for Toys for Tots. He was also the president of Actors and Others for Animals for 25 years.

== Early life and education ==
Henry Earl Holliman was born on September 11, 1928, in Delhi, Louisiana. His biological father, William A. Frost, was a farmer who died six months before his birth. His mother, Mary Smith, was living in poverty with several other children and gave him up for adoption at birth, while her other children were sent to orphanages until she could take them all back, which she did. Earl was the seventh of ten children overall and, in later years, he was able to reconnect and establish relationships with them.

He was adopted a week after his birth by Henry Holliman, a traveling oilfield worker, and his wife Velma, a waitress, who then gave him the name Henry Earl Holliman. He was so frail in his infancy that one doctor predicted he would not live long enough to see childhood, but Velma's sister provided him with a generous dose of castor oil shortly after, which saved his life. Although his upbringing and family history have strong ties to Louisiana, during his teenage years he and his family lived in Kerrville, Texas, for a time, as well as some parts of Arkansas, which he once stated made him out to be a "red-blooded Ark-La-Texan".

Holliman's early years were normal until Henry died when he was 13. Earl credited Henry and Velma with providing him with so much love and encouragement that despite their own poverty they helped him in terms of looking deep within himself to discover his self-confidence in converting his dreams into reality. In addition, when he began his career in films, Velma was so supportive of him that she once even went to a theater in Louisiana an hour before it opened just so she could be the first attendee present. She wanted to see him in his first major film appearance and to work with the theater manager, show columnist, and a friend of the family to go through a vast set of stills for that particular movie so she could begin the composition of an album for him reflecting the start of his professional career as an actor.

Holliman saved money from his positions as an usher at the Strand Theatre, as a newsboy for The Shreveport Times, and as a magician's assistant before he left Louisiana for Hollywood. After an unsuccessful first attempt finding work in the film industry, he soon returned to Louisiana after being in California for only one week. Meanwhile, Velma had remarried, and Holliman disliked his new stepfather Guy Bellotte so much that he lied about his age and enlisted in the United States Navy during World War II. Assigned to a Navy communications school in Los Angeles, Holliman spent his free time at the Hollywood Canteen, talking to stars who dropped by to support the servicemen and women. A year after his enlistment, the Navy discovered his real age and he was immediately discharged.

Holliman returned home, worked in the oilfields in his spare time, washed dishes at various restaurants, and after some attendance at Louisiana Avenue, Fair Park, and Byrd High School in Shreveport, completed his public education at Oil City High School in Oil City, graduating with high honors in 1946; while a student there, he also played right tackle on the school football team and served as senior-class president. After rejecting a scholarship to Louisiana State University, he re-enlisted in the Navy and was stationed in Norfolk, Virginia. Interested in acting, he was cast as the lead in several Norfolk Navy Theatre productions. When he left the Navy for good, he studied acting at the Pasadena Playhouse. He also graduated from the University of California, Los Angeles. During the time he studied acting at both the Playhouse and UCLA, he supplemented his income working as a file clerk for Blue Cross (later known as Blue Cross Blue Shield Association) and with North American Aviation constructing airplanes.

== Career ==
=== Film ===
While at the Pasadena Playhouse, Holliman entered the Paramount lot by claiming he had an appointment with a studio barber. Eventually he became friendly with studio executives. Holliman first got a small bit part opposite Dean Martin and Jerry Lewis in Scared Stiff (1953). Next he was cast as a marine in The Girls of Pleasure Island (1953), for which he needed a G.I. haircut. Finally he saw the barber and ended up with a haircut (and bangs) that changed his life.

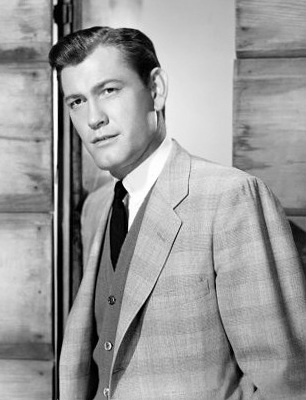
Holliman in the 1950s

After he gained popularity for his image following a change in hairstyle, he then followed with three more films released in 1953. His many credits include: Broken Lance (1954), The Bridges at Toko-Ri (1954), The Big Combo (1955), I Died a Thousand Times (1955), Forbidden Planet (1956), Giant (1956), The Rainmaker (1956), Gunfight at the O.K. Corral (1957), Don't Go Near the Water (1957), Hot Spell (1958), The Trap (1959), Last Train from Gun Hill (1959), Visit to a Small Planet (1960), Armored Command (1961), The Sons of Katie Elder (1965), Anzio (1968), The Desperate Mission (1969), Smoke (1970), The Biscuit Eater (1972), The Solitary Man (1979), Sharky's Machine (1981), and Gunsmoke: Return to Dodge (1987).

Holliman played a doomed helicopter crewman in the William Holden war drama The Bridges at Toko-Ri and a gangster's double-crossed thug in The Big Combo. He co-starred with Jack Palance in the crime drama I Died a Thousand Times (1955), a remake of High Sierra. He starred in The Rainmaker (1956), opposite Katharine Hepburn and Burt Lancaster, playing a rancher's timid son, who finally must defy his brother to gain self-respect, for which he won the Golden Globe Award for Best Supporting Actor – Motion Picture; he was cast in the role instead of Elvis Presley. His role in Rainmaker brought him such praise that columnist Louella Parsons cited him being "as dedicated as though he were Marlon Brando and Anthony Perkins combined".

He was the soft-spoken son-in-law of rancher Bick Benedict, played by Rock Hudson, in the epic Western saga Giant. Holliman played many roles set in the American West. He was Wyatt Earp's deputy in Gunfight at the O.K. Corral, co-starring Lancaster and Kirk Douglas, and a sniveling coward guilty of murdering and raping the wife of a lawman (Kirk Douglas) in Last Train from Gun Hill. He played a drunken deputy sheriff whose brother Richard Widmark returns to town in a modern-day Western, The Trap (1959), and the brother of John Wayne, Dean Martin, and Michael Anderson Jr., out to avenge their murdered father, in a traditional Western, The Sons of Katie Elder.

=== Television ===
Holliman became known to television audiences through his portrayal as Sundance in CBS's Hotel de Paree, with co-star Jeanette Nolan, from 1959 to 1960, and in the title role of Mitch Guthrie with Andrew Prine in NBC's Wide Country, a drama about modern rodeo performers that aired for 28 episodes between 1962 and 1963. He also had the distinction of appearing in the debut episode of CBS's The Twilight Zone, titled "Where Is Everybody?", which aired on October 2, 1959, the same night as the premiere of Hotel de Paree. In 1967, Holliman guest-starred on Wayne Maunder's short-lived ABC military-Western series Custer. In 1970 and 1971, Holliman made two appearances in the Western comedy series Alias Smith and Jones starring Pete Duel and Ben Murphy.

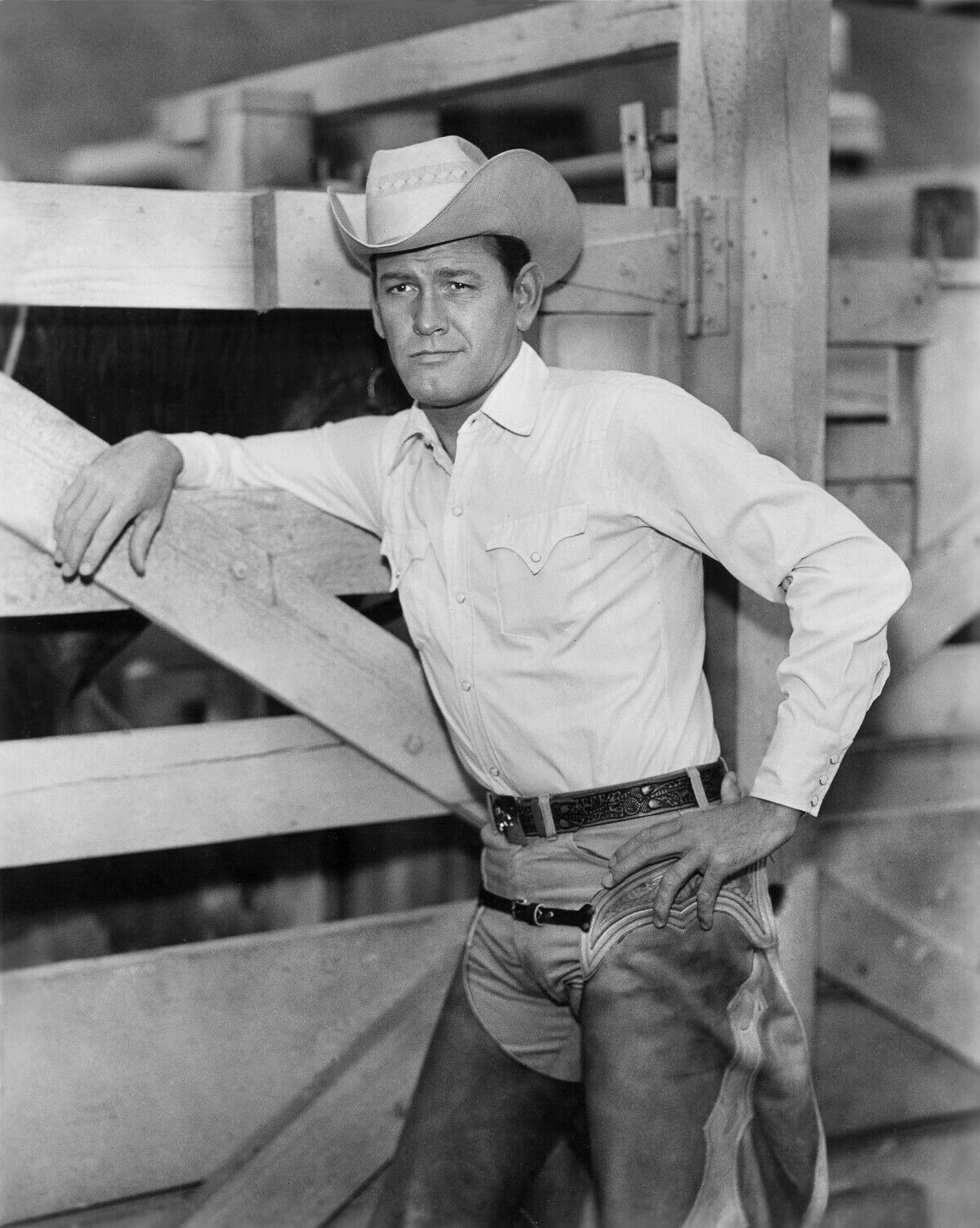
Holliman in a publicity portrait for Wide Country

From 1974 to 1978, he portrayed Sergeant Bill Crowley opposite Angie Dickinson in the Police Woman series. He co-starred in all 91 episodes of the hit series (which he later remarked changed his life), playing the police department superior of undercover officer Pepper Anderson. He later took part in The Dean Martin Celebrity Roast comedy roast of co-star Dickinson on August 2, 1977.

Holliman continued to appear in television guest roles throughout the 1970s to 1990s. He shared a starring role in the CBS movie Country Gold (a made for television remake of All About Eve), filmed on location in Nashville, Tennessee, which also featured Loni Anderson, Linda Hamilton, and Cooper Huckabee. He was also a regular celebrity panelist on Hollywood Squares, where he was recognized for his ability to trick the contestants with believable bluff answers. His most notable role during this period was in the hit miniseries The Thorn Birds with Richard Chamberlain and Rachel Ward. He also took part in the Gunsmoke reunion movie Gunsmoke: Return to Dodge in 1987 as Jake Flagg, having guest-starred on the Gunsmoke television series with James Arness three times between 1969 and 1973.

He was an occasional celebrity on the $25,000 and $100,000 Pyramid game shows between 1983 and 1991. In 1991 and 1994, Holliman had two guest-star roles on Murder, She Wrote. From September 15, 1991, to January 4, 1992, he appeared in the lead role of Detective Matthew Durning on the CBS sitcom P.S. I Luv U (a role which he got due to his prominence in Police Woman two decades prior).

Later in his career, Holliman had a recurring role as Fred Duffy, the father of the title character Caroline Duffy, on Caroline in the City, appearing in three episodes, and he additionally starred in the 1997–99 television series Night Man as Frank Dominus, a disgraced former police officer and father of the main character.

=== Music ===
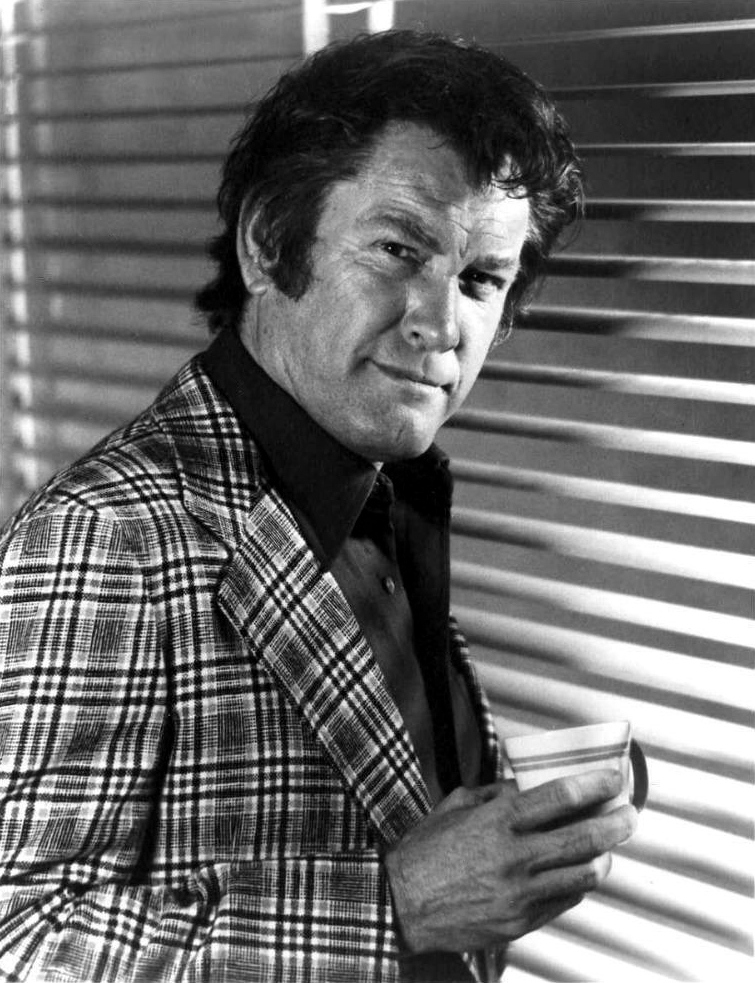
Holliman in a publicity portrait for Police Woman

From 1958 to 1963, Holliman found a brief but successful career as a singer, and had a record deal with such notable recording studios as Capitol Records, Prep, and HiFi. His songs included: "A Teenager Sings the Blues", "Nobody Knows How I Feel", "Don't Get Around Much Anymore", "Sittin' and a Gabbin'", "If I Could See the World Through the Eyes of a Child", "La La La Lovable", "Wanna Kiss You To-Night", "I'm in the Mood for Love", "We Found Love", "Willingly", "There'll Be No Teardrops Tonight", and "Road to Nowhere". In May 1976, he guest-starred on The John Davidson Show singing a vaudeville-style version of "(Hey Won't You Play) Another Somebody Done Somebody Wrong Song" with Davidson, as well as performing his own solo version of The Carpenters track, "Rainy Days and Mondays".

=== Stage ===
After Wide Country ended its run in April 1963, Holliman spent the next two months traveling the country in the acclaimed musical Oklahoma! appearing in the lead role of Curly McLain. Later that same year, he appeared in the role of Mike Mitchell in the Philadelphia, Pennsylvania, summer tour of Sunday in New York and at the Avondale Playhouse in Indianapolis, in The Country Girl in the role of Bernie Dodd opposite Lee Bowman and Julie Wilson. Between September 4 and 9, 1963, he starred in a production of The Tender Trap, opposite Anthony George, in the role of Charlie Y. Reader at the Westchester County Playhouse in Dobbs Ferry, New York. In 1968, he starred in the Los Angeles Mark Taper Forum production of Tennessee Williams' Camino Real in the role of Kilroy; his performance was well received by critics and Williams himself not only came to see Earl's performance about 11 times, but he also sent him a correspondence praising his work in both Real and Streetcar as being "the best" interpretations of the characters "Kilroy" and "Mitch" he had even seen. In 1973, he performed as Mitch in a revival of A Streetcar Named Desire.

From September 15 to October 14, 1981, he starred in a stage production of Mister Roberts at the Fiesta Dinner Playhouse in San Antonio, Texas, of which he had ownership. He occasionally performed at his theater when he was not working in Hollywood; other productions in which he appeared there include Arsenic and Old Lace as Mortimer Brewster from April 1 to May 4, 1980, and Same Time, Next Year with Julie Sommars in 1983. The facility closed after 1987. He also appeared in stage productions of the 1973 revival of A Streetcar Named Desire as Mitch and the 1977 Santa Monica Civic production of A Chorus Line as Zach the Choreographer.

== Personal life and death ==
In 1960, Holliman lived in Paris, in a flat on the Left Bank. While he adopted the French culture and language quite rapidly, he maintained his reputation for being "as American as apple pie." After returning to the United States to live, Holliman became a longtime resident of Studio City, California.

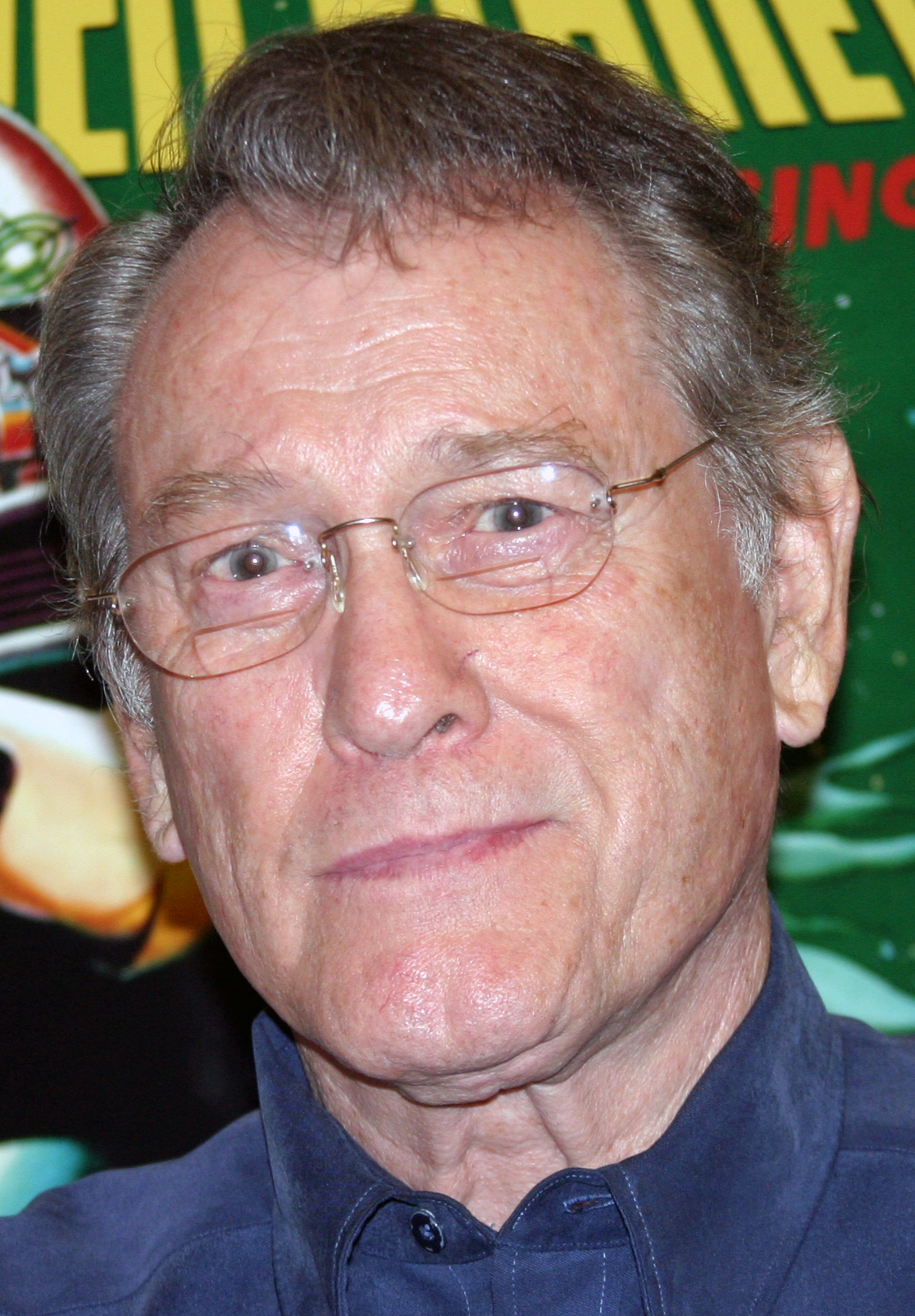
Holliman in 2006

In 1976, he was the grand marshal of the Annual Fourth of July Parade in Huntington Beach, California.

In 2005, Holliman announced to a New York Post columnist that “his pal”, actor Anthony George, had died at age 84.

Holliman died in hospice care at his home in Studio City, on November 25, 2024, at the age of 96.

Though he never spoke publicly about his sexuality, Holliman was confirmed to have had a male spouse at the time of his death in November 2024; his husband, Craig Curtis, spoke publicly to The Hollywood Reporter to confirm his death.

His cremains remained with his husband for almost two years and will soon be buried at Oakwood Memorial Park in Chatsworth, California, where a plot has now been reserved.

=== Charitable works and activism ===
During the late 1970s, he served as the national honorary chairman for the Marine Toys for Tots Foundation.

Holliman was a vegetarian and against using animal fur for clothing. He was known for his work as an animal rights activist, including serving for more than 25 years as president of Actors and Others for Animals. He was well known for nursing animals on his own property, at one point feeding roughly 500 pigeons in a day, as well as healing a wounded dove and a blind opossum inside his home. For many years, he was one of many in the film community to help organize meals during the Christmas season for the less fortunate at the Los Angeles Mission.

== Awards and nominations ==
In addition to his Golden Globe Award for Best Supporting Actor – Motion Picture for The Rainmaker, he also earned a nomination for a Golden Globe Award for "Best Performance by an Actor in a Supporting Role in a Television Series" for his performance alongside Delta Burke in the short-lived 1992 sitcom Delta.

For his contributions to the television industry, Holliman has a star on the Hollywood Walk of Fame located at 6901 Hollywood Blvd.

Year	Result	Award	Role	Ref.
1957	Won	Golden Globe Awards - Best Supporting Actor	The Rainmaker (1956)	
1966	Won	Western Heritage Awards Bronze Wrangler		
1993	Nominated	Golden Globe Awards Best Performance by an Actor in a Supporting Role in a Series, Miniseries or Motion Picture Made for Television	Delta (1992)	

== See also ==
- Earl Holliman filmography
