= Wide Country (TV series) =

American Western television series (1962–1963)

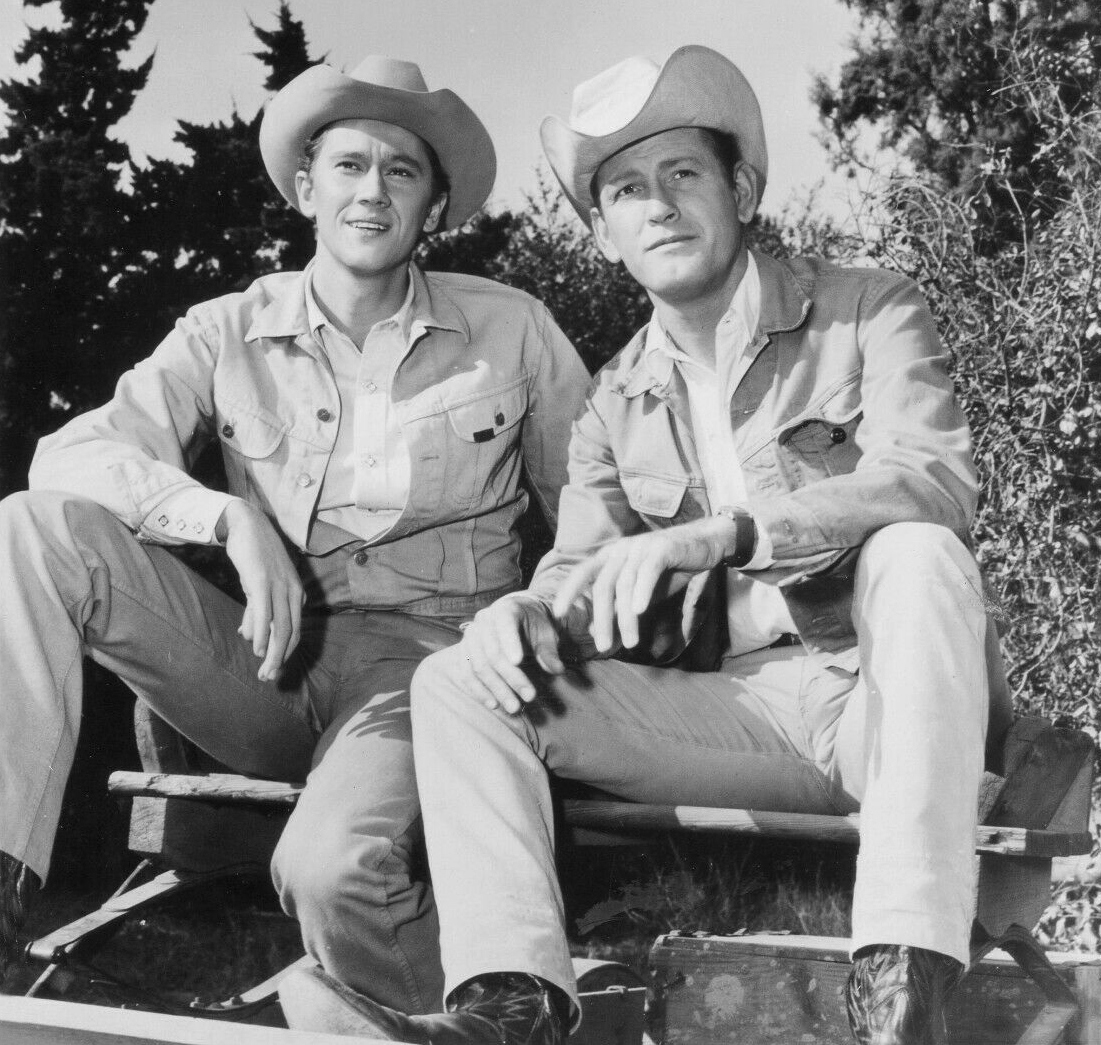
- Andrew Prine and Earl Holliman in a publicity portrait for The Wide Country episode The Girl from Knob Hill
- Genre: Western
- Written by: Alan Le May
- Directed by: Alan Crosland Jr.
- Starring: Earl Holliman; Andrew Prine; Slim Pickens
- Theme music composer: John Williams
- Composers: Morton Stevens; John Williams
- Country of origin: United States
- Original language: English
- No. of seasons: 1
- No. of episodes: 28

Production
- Producers: Ralph Edwards; Frank Telford
- Cinematography: Walter Strenge
- Editor: Milton Shifman
- Running time: 45–48 minutes
- Production companies: Ralph Edwards Productions; Revue Studios

Original release
- Network: NBC
- Release: September 20, 1962 – April 25, 1963

Wide Country is an American Western television series that aired on NBC from September 20, 1962, to April 25, 1963.

== Synopsis ==
The series stars Earl Holliman and Andrew Prine as brothers, Mitch and Andy Guthrie, respectively, who are traveling rodeo competitors.

== Episode list ==
No.	Title	Directed by	Written by	Original release date
1	"The Royce Bennett Story"	Alan Crosland Jr.	Donald S. Sanford	September 20, 1962
2	"A Guy for Clementine"	Don Weis	Harold Swanton	September 27, 1962
3	"Journey Down a Dusty Road"	John Newland	John Hawkins	October 4, 1962
4	"Who Killed Edde Gannon?"	Robert Ellis Miller	Andy Lewis	October 11, 1962
5	"What Are Friends For?"	John Brahm	Sy Salkowitz	October 18, 1962
6	"Straitjacket for an Indian"	John Florea	Alan Le May	October 25, 1962
7	"Our Ernie Kills People"	John Florea	T : Mark Rodgers; S : Preston Wood	November 1, 1962
8	"A Devil in the Chute"	Alan Crosland Jr.	Archie L. Tegland	November 8, 1962
9	"The Girl in the Sunshine Smile"	John Brahm	Ken Kolb	November 15, 1962
10	"Tears on a Painted Face"	Herschel Daugherty	Louis Pelletier	November 29, 1962
11	"The Bravest Man in the World"	Ted Post	Margaret & Paul Schneider	December 6, 1962
12	"Good Old Uncle Walt"	Don Weis	Dave & Andy Lewis	December 13, 1962
13	"My Candle Burns at Both Ends"	Ted Post	S : June Randolph; S/T : Mark Rodgers	December 20, 1962
14	"Memory of a Filly"	Don Weis	Alan Le May	January 3, 1963
15	"Step Over the Sky"	William Witney	Gustave Field	January 10, 1963
16	"A Cry from the Mountain"	John Peyser	William D. Gordon	January 17, 1963
17	"Don't Cry for Johnny Devlin"	John Florea	Harold Swanton	January 24, 1963
18	"Speckle Bird"	John Peyser	T : Carey Wilber; S : Slim Pickens	January 31, 1963
19	"The Man Who Ran Away"	John English	John Hawkins	February 7, 1963
20	"Whose Hand at My Throat?"	John Brahm	Gustave Field	February 14, 1963
21	"The Judas Goat"	John Peyser	T : Mark Rodgers; S : Jameson Brewer	February 21, 1963
22	"To Cindy, with Love"	Paul Nickell	S/T : Franklin Barton; Based on a story by Slim Pickens & Franklin Adreon	February 28, 1963
23	"The Quest for Jacob Blaufus"	John Peyser	Harold Swanton	March 7, 1963
24	"Farewell to Margarita"	Earl Bellamy	Mark Rodgers	March 21, 1963
25	"The Girl from Nob Hill"	John Peyser	Dave & Andy Lewis	March 28, 1963
26	"Yanqui, Go Home!"	Don Weis	T : Preston Wood; S : Franklin Barton	April 4, 1963
27	"The Lucky Punch"	Don Weis	Ken Kolb	April 18, 1963
28	"The Care and Handling of Tigers"	John Peyser	T : Preston Wood; S : Gilbert Ralston	April 25, 1963

== Guest stars ==
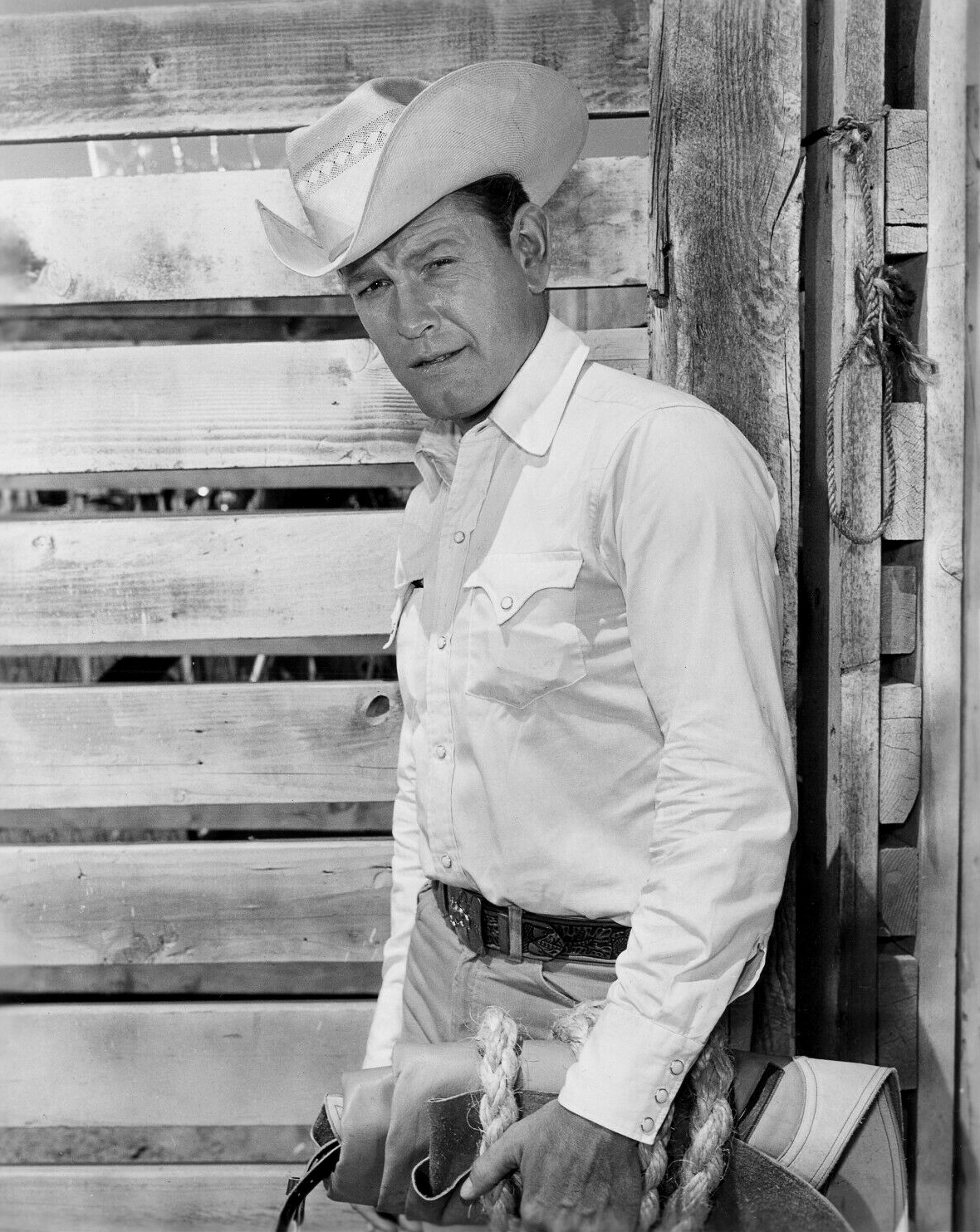
Holliman in a publicity portrait for the show

- Claude Akins
- Eddie Albert
- Frank Aletter
- Michael Ansara
- Rayford Barnes
- Noah Beery Jr.
- Nesdon Booth
- Edgar Buchanan
- Walter Burke
- James Caan
- Conlan Carter
- Jack Cassidy
- Lonny Chapman
- Richard Collier
- Yvonne Craig
- John Dehner
- Patty Duke
- Steve Forrest
- Eduard Franz
- Anthony George
- Alan Hale Jr.
- Anne Helm
- Clyde Howdy
- Rodolfo Hoyos Jr.
- Jean Inness
- I. Stanford Jolley
- Diane Ladd
- Nolan Leary
- Norman Leavitt
- Karl Lukas
- Dayton Lummis
- Ralph Manza
- Peggy McCay
- Jim McMullan
- Roger Mobley
- Read Morgan
- Jay Novello
- Barbara Parkins
- Slim Pickens
- Ford Rainey
- Anthony Ray
- Chris Robinson
- Barbara Stuart
- Olive Sturgess
- Lyle Talbot
- Ray Teal
- Forrest Tucker
- Lurene Tuttle
- Ray Walston
- Bruce Yarnell

== Home media ==
On November 15, 2011, Timeless Media Group released Wide Country- The Complete Television Series on DVD in Region 1. The 8-disc set features all 28 episodes of the series.
