= The Trap (1959 film) =

1959 film by Norman Panama

- Theatrical release poster
- Directed by: Norman Panama
- Written by: Richard Alan Simmons; Norman Panama
- Produced by: Melvin Frank; Norman Panama
- Starring: Richard Widmark; Lee J. Cobb; Tina Louise; Earl Holliman; Lorne Greene
- Cinematography: Daniel L. Fapp
- Edited by: Everett Douglas
- Music by: Irvin Talbot
- Distributed by: Paramount Pictures
- Release date: January 28, 1959 (United States)
- Running time: 81 minutes
- Country: United States
- Language: English
- Box office: $1.1 million (est. US/ Canada rentals)

The Trap is a 1959 American color film noir directed by Norman Panama and released through Paramount Pictures. It stars Richard Widmark, Lee J. Cobb, Tina Louise, Earl Holliman, and Lorne Greene.

== Plot ==
Ralph Anderson returns to his remote California hometown for the first time in many years. Now a lawyer, he has been estranged from his father, Lloyd, and brother, Tippy, ever since being sent to reform school as a youth for stealing a car, taking the blame for his brother's crime.

Lloyd is now sheriff and Tippy his deputy. Forced to represent a wanted criminal, Ralph asks the law to look the other way while a local airfield is used to enable the mobster, Massonetti, to flee the country. A disgusted Lloyd agrees to help, but Tippy decides he will arrest Massonetti and cash in on a big reward.

Tippy's beautiful wife Linda was once the love of Ralph's life and regrets his long absence. She is tired of Tippy's shiftless, drunken ways and Lloyd's domineering rule of the family.

Massonetti arrives in town, backed by Davis, his top thug. Tippy and two deputies, Karger and Eddie, make an amateurish attempt to capture Massonetti, only to get Lloyd shot and killed while trying to stop them. Ralph manages to get Massonetti behind bars at the town jail.

The mob cuts off phone communication and highway access to the town. Ralph suggests driving Massonetti to the authorities in Barstow in the mobster's own fast car. Noticing the tension between the brothers, Massonetti taunts them both and offers $25,000 to tempt Tippy into betraying Ralph and setting him free.

On the road, deputy Eddie is ambushed and the brothers learn that Linda has been abducted. A deal is made to get her back, but Karger is killed and the car is disabled. Ralph manages to get the four of them to a gas station, where the owner is found shot. In a fight for the gun, Ralph is winged and Tippy seriously wounded.

Borrowing a miner's jeep, Ralph drives Massonetti to a main highway, where two policemen take them into custody. They turn out to be impostors who drive Massonetti to an air strip where Davis is waiting with a plane. After they board, Ralph drives the car into the plane, overturning it. He drags Massonetti from the wreckage and holds him until real cops arrive. By the time he returns to the gas station, Linda is watching Tippy's lifeless body being carried away.

== Cast ==
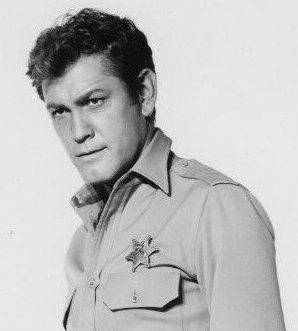
Earl Holliman in a promotional photograph for the film

- Richard Widmark as Ralph Anderson
- Lee J. Cobb as Victor Massonetti
- Tina Louise as Linda Anderson
- Earl Holliman as Tippy Anderson
- Carl Benton Reid as Sheriff Lloyd Anderson
- Lorne Greene as Davis
- Peter Baldwin as Mellon
- Chuck Wassil as First Fake Policeman
- Richard Shannon as Len Karger
- Carl Milletaire as Eddie

== Reception ==
=== Critical response ===
When released, The New York Times film critic, Bosley Crowther, gave the film a mixed review, writing, "And its tale of a conscience-smitten shyster nabbing a contemporary fugitive badman and bringing him in, against grueling opposition, is in the Western vein. It is not in the high tradition. After a promising start, in which the shyster transforms from a mouthpiece for the fugitive into a self-appointed deputy for his sheriff father, who gets killed, it settles down rather flatly into an ordinary "chase," with the shyster attempting to get the badman by automobile to Barstow, 120 miles away...However, for all its pattern plotting and its heavy reliance on the guns, it comes off a fairly taut picture in the outdoor action frame. Norman Panama, who, with Melvin Frank, produced it, directed it and helped to write the script, has seen to it that there's no waste motion and that the pressure is on all the time."

=== Awards ===
Nominations

- Laurel Awards: Golden Laurel, Top Action Drama; Top Action Performance, Richard Widmark; 1959

== See also ==
- List of American films of 1959
