= Where Is Everybody? =

- The Twilight Zone episode
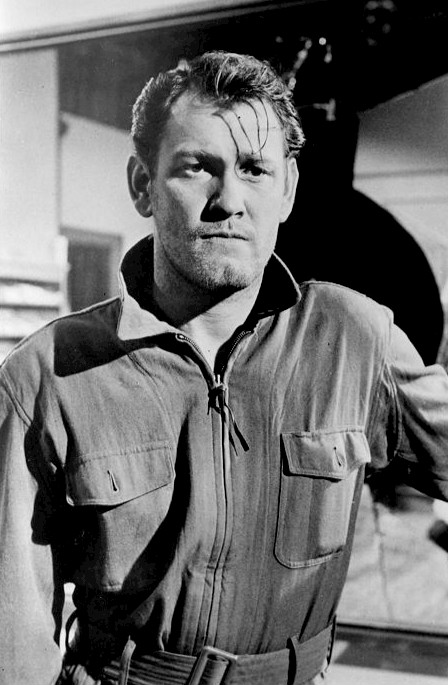
- Earl Holliman in "Where Is Everybody?"
- Episode no.: Season 1 Episode 1
- Directed by: Robert Stevens
- Written by: Rod Serling
- Cinematography by: Joseph La Shelle
- Editing by: Roland Gross
- Production code: 173-3601
- Original air date: October 2, 1959

Guest appearances
- Earl Holliman as Mike Ferris; James Gregory as General; Garry Walberg as Colonel; Paul Langton as Doctor

Episode chronology
← Previous —	Next → "One for the Angels"
- The Twilight Zone (1959 TV series, season 1)

"Where Is Everybody?" is the first episode of the American anthology television series The Twilight Zone and was originally broadcast on October 2, 1959, on CBS.

== Opening narration ==
The place is here, the time is now, and the journey into the shadows that we're about to watch could be our journey.

== Plot ==
A man finds himself walking alone on a dirt road, with no memory of who he is or how he got there. He finds a diner and walks in to find a jukebox playing loudly, but nobody present; he lowers the volume and continues to call out. Eventually, he heads into the kitchen where he finds a hot pot of coffee on the stove and freshly made pies, but still no other people besides himself. He accidentally knocks over and breaks a clock, at which point the jukebox stops playing.

The man leaves the diner and walks to a nearby town; he sees a parked truck with an apparent female passenger, but "she" turns out to be a mannequin. Like the diner, the rest of the town seems deserted, but the man feels he is being watched and that there is someone around. The phone rings in a telephone booth and he dashes to answer it. There is nobody on the line and he can only raise a recorded message when he tries to call the operator. He grows unsettled as he wanders through the empty town, increasingly anxious to find someone to talk to.

Inside the police station, he uses the radio ("Calling all cars, calling all cars, unknown man walking around police station..."); then he notices a lit cigar in an ashtray. This prods him to check the jail cells in back. In one cell, there is evidence that someone had recently been there shaving. He declares that he wants to "wake up now", and makes his way to the soda shop. As he makes himself a sundae, he considers his situation to be a dream he must be having and marvels at how detailed it is. He idly spins a few racks of paperback books until he notices an entire rack of books titled The Last Man on Earth, Feb. 1959 already spinning. This spooks him and he quickly leaves.

As night falls, lights turn on and the man is drawn to the illuminated movie theater marquee. The advertised film is Battle Hymn and an advertisement outside of a man dressed as he is, directing a fighter jet on the tarmac, causes him to realize that he is in the U.S. Air Force. Running inside and finding nobody in the audience, he begins to wonder what could have happened with the Air Force that resulted in his being in this situation, until the film begins to play. He runs to the projection booth, finding it empty; in a panic, he runs downstairs and crashes into a mirror. When he recovers from this shock, he gives in to terror and races through the streets until he comes upon a "walk" button and desperately pushes it over and over, begging for help. The button is revealed to be a panic button: the man—Sergeant Mike Ferris—is actually in an isolation booth being observed by a group of uniformed servicemen. He has been undergoing tests to determine his fitness as an astronaut and whether he can handle a prolonged trip to the Moon alone; the town was a hallucination caused by sensory deprivation. He had been in the booth for over 484 hours, 37 minutes.

The officiating general warns Ferris that while his basic needs will be provided for in space travel, he will not have companionship: "next time [he will] really be alone". As Ferris is carried from the hangar on a stretcher, he looks into the sky and tells the Moon, "don't go away up there" and, "we'll be up there in a little while".

== Closing narration ==
Up there, up there in the vastness of space, in the void that is sky, up there is an enemy known as isolation. It sits there in the stars waiting, waiting with the patience of eons, forever waiting... in the Twilight Zone.

== Production ==
Serling's original pilot for The Twilight Zone was "The Happy Place", which revolved around a society in which people were executed upon reaching the age of 60, being considered no longer useful. CBS executive William Self rejected the story, feeling it was too dark; Serling eventually relented and wrote "Where is Everybody?" as a more acceptable substitute. Unlike other episodes, which were filmed at Metro-Goldwyn-Mayer, "Where is Everybody?" was filmed at Universal Studios, using Courthouse Square as the episode's Oakwood town.

The episode originally featured Westbrook Van Voorhis as narrator. When Voorhis was unavailable for later episodes, Serling re-recorded the narration himself for consistency. Serling notably changed the opening narration to place the Twilight Zone within the fifth dimension, among other alterations.

Serling later adapted "Where is Everybody?" for a novelization titled Stories From the Twilight Zone. Serling allegedly grew dissatisfied with the lack of science fiction content and changed the story to include Ferris discovering a movie ticket in his pocket while on the stretcher. A variation on this plotline was used in the episode "King Nine Will Not Return".

== Reception ==
The New York Times praised the episode, saying that Serling proved "that science cannot foretell what may be the effect of total isolation on a human being", though "[the episode's] resolution... seemed trite and anticlimactic. In the desultory field of filmed half-hour drama, however, Mr. Serling should not have much trouble in making his mark. At least his series promises to be different."

Charles Beaumont praised the episode in The Magazine of Fantasy and Science Fiction, writing that he "read Serling's first script... Old stuff? Of course. I thought so at the time... but there was one element in the story which kept me from my customary bitterness. The element was quality. Quality shone on every page. It shone in the dialogue and in the scene set-ups. And because of this, the story seemed fresh and new and powerful. There was one compromise, but it was made for the purpose of selling the series."
