= Sally Field filmography =

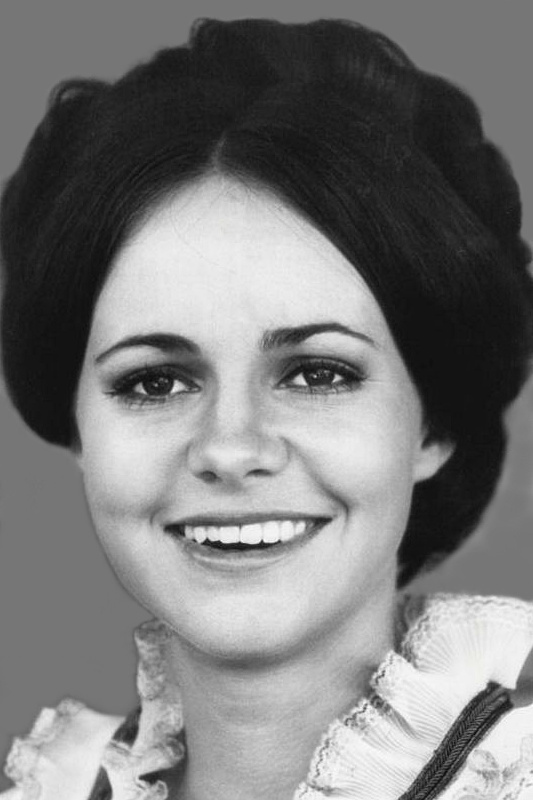
Sally Field in a 1971 promotional photograph for the television series Alias Smith and Jones

Sally Field is an American actress and director. She is the recipient of various accolades, including two Academy Awards, four Primetime Emmy Awards, two Golden Globe Awards, and a Screen Actors Guild Award, and she has been nominated for a Tony Award and two BAFTA Awards.

Field began her professional career on television, starring in the short-lived comedies Gidget (1965–1966), The Flying Nun (1967–1970), and The Girl with Something Extra (1973–1974). In 1976, she garnered critical acclaim for her performance in the miniseries Sybil, for which she received the Primetime Emmy Award for Outstanding Lead Actress in a Limited Series or Movie. Her film debut was as an extra in Moon Pilot (1962), but it escalated during the 1970s with starring roles including Stay Hungry (1976), Smokey and the Bandit (1977), Heroes (1977), The End (1978), and Hooper (1978). Her career further expanded during the 1980s, receiving the Academy Award for Best Actress for both Norma Rae (1979) and Places in the Heart (1984), and she appeared in Smokey and the Bandit II (1980), Absence of Malice (1981), Kiss Me Goodbye (1982), Murphy's Romance (1985), Steel Magnolias (1989), Mrs. Doubtfire (1993), and Forrest Gump (1994).

In the 2000s, she returned to television with a recurring role on the NBC medical drama ER, for which she won the Primetime Emmy Award for Outstanding Guest Actress in a Drama Series in 2001 and the following year made her stage debut with Edward Albee's The Goat, or Who Is Sylvia?. From 2006 to 2011, she portrayed Nora Walker on the ABC television drama Brothers & Sisters, for which she received the Primetime Emmy Award for Outstanding Lead Actress in a Drama Series in 2007. She starred as Mary Todd Lincoln in Lincoln (2012), for which she received a nomination for the Academy Award for Best Supporting Actress, and she portrayed Aunt May in The Amazing Spider-Man (2012) and its 2014 sequel, with the first being her highest grossing release. In 2015, she portrayed the title character in Hello, My Name Is Doris, for which she was nominated for the Critics' Choice Movie Award for Best Actress in a Comedy. In 2017, she returned to the stage after an absence of 15 years with the revival of Tennessee Williams' The Glass Menagerie for which she received a nomination for the Tony Award for Best Actress in a Play.

As a director, Field is known for the television film The Christmas Tree (1996), an episode of the 1998 HBO miniseries From the Earth to the Moon, and the feature film Beautiful (2000). In 2014, she was presented with a star on the Hollywood Walk of Fame and in 2019 received the Kennedy Center Honors.

== Filmography ==
=== Film ===
Year	Title	Role	Notes
1962	Moon Pilot	Beatnik Girl In Lineup	Uncredited
1967	The Way West	Mercy McBee	
1976	Stay Hungry	Mary Tate Farnsworth	
1977	Smokey and the Bandit	Carrie "Frog"	
1977	Heroes	Carol Bell	
1978	The End	Mary Ellen	
1978	Hooper	Gwen Doyle	
1979	Norma Rae	Norma Rae Webster	Academy Award for Best Actress
1979	Beyond the Poseidon Adventure	Celeste Whitman	
1980	Smokey and the Bandit II	Carrie "Frog"	
1981	Back Roads	Amy Post	
1981	Absence of Malice	Megan Carter	
1982	Kiss Me Goodbye	Kay Villano	
1984	Places in the Heart	Edna Spalding	Academy Award for Best Actress
1985	Murphy's Romance	Emma Moriarty	
1987	Surrender	Daisy Morgan	
1988	Punchline	Lilah Krytsick	
1989	Steel Magnolias	M'Lynn Eatenton	
1991	Not Without My Daughter	Betty Mahmoody	
1991	Soapdish	Celeste Talbert / Maggie	
1993	Homeward Bound: The Incredible Journey	Sassy	Voice
1993	Mrs. Doubtfire	Miranda Hillard	
1994	A Century of Cinema	Herself	Documentary
1994	Forrest Gump	Mrs. Gump	
1996	Eye for an Eye	Karen McCann	
1996	Homeward Bound II: Lost in San Francisco	Sassy	Voice
2000	Where the Heart Is	Mama Lil	
2000	Beautiful	Trixie	Director
2001	Say It Isn't So	Valdine Wingfield	
2003	Legally Blonde 2: Red, White & Blonde	Victoria Rudd	
2005	Going Through Splat: The Life and Work of Stewart Stern	Herself	Documentary
2006	Two Weeks	Anita Bergman	
2008	The Little Mermaid: Ariel's Beginning	Marina Del Rey	Voice
2012	The Amazing Spider-Man	Aunt May Parker	
2012	Lincoln	Mary Todd Lincoln	Academy Award nomination for Best Supporting Actress
2014	The Amazing Spider-Man 2	Aunt May Parker	
2015	Hello, My Name Is Doris	Doris Miller	
2017	Little Evil	Miss Shaylock	
2019	National Theatre Live: All My Sons	Kate Keller	Theatrical live presentation of UK stage production
2022	Spoiler Alert	Marilyn Cowan	
2023	80 for Brady	Betty	
2026	Remarkably Bright Creatures	Tova Sullivan	

=== Television ===
Year	Title	Role	Notes
1965–1966	Gidget	Frances Elizabeth 'Gidget' Lawrence	Main cast, 32 episodes
1966	Occasional Wife	Nancy Zogerdorfer	Episode: "No Talent Scouts"
1967	Hey, Landlord	Bonnie Banner	Recurring role, 4 episodes
1967–1970	The Flying Nun	Sister Bertrille / Elsie Ethrington	Main cast, 82 episodes
1970	Bracken's World	Jenny Marsh	Episode: "Jenny, Who Bombs Buildings"
1971–1972	Alias Smith and Jones	Clementine Hale	Recurring role, 2 episodes
1971	Maybe I'll Come Home in the Spring	Denise "Dennie" Miller	Television film
1971	Hitched	Roselle Bridgeman	Television film
1971	Marcus Welby, M.D.	Jan Wilkins / June Wilkins	Episode: "I Can Hardly Tell You Apart"
1971	Marriage: Year One	Jane Duden	Television film
1971	Mongo's Back in Town	Vikki	Television film
1972	Home for the Holidays	Christine "Chris" Morgan	Television film
1973	Night Gallery	Irene Evans	Episode: "Whisper"
1973–1974	The Girl with Something Extra	Sally Burton	Main cast, 22 episodes
1976	Bridger	Jennifer Melford	Television film
1976	Sybil	Sybil Dorsett	Television film
1979	Carol Burnett & Company	Herself	Episode #1.4
1981	All the Way Home	Mary Follet	Television film (live broadcast of stage production)
1982	Lily for President?	Beth Barber	Television special
1993	Saturday Night Live	Herself (host)	Episode: "Sally Field/Tony! Toni! Toné!"
1995	A Woman of Independent Means	Bess Alcott Steed Garner	Television miniseries, 3 episodes
1996	The Larry Sanders Show	Herself	Episode: "Where Is the Love?"
1996	The Christmas Tree	Claire	Television film, director and co-writer
1997	King of the Hill	Junie Harper	Voice, episode: "Hilloween"
1997	Merry Christmas, George Bailey	Mrs. Bailey / Narrator	Television film
1998	Murphy Brown	Kathleen Dubek, Secretary #91	Episode: "Opus One"
1998	From the Earth to the Moon	Trudy Cooper	Television miniseries, 1 episode; also director (1 episode)
1999	A Cooler Climate	Iris Prue	Television film
2000	David Copperfield	Betsey Trotwood	Television film
2000–2006	ER	Maggie Wyczenski	Recurring role, 12 episodes
2002	The Court	Justice Kate Nolan	Main cast, 6 episodes
2005	Conviction		Television film
2006–2011	Brothers & Sisters	Nora Walker	Main cast, 109 episodes
2017	Spielberg	Herself (interview)	Television documentary
2018	Maniac	Dr. Greta Mantleray	Television miniseries
2020	Dispatches from Elsewhere	Janice Foster	Main cast, 10 episodes
2022	Winning Time: The Rise of the Lakers Dynasty	Jessie Buss	Main cast (Season 1), 9 episodes
2022	The Last Movie Stars	Herself (interview)	4 episodes

== Stage ==
Year	Title	Role	Theatre
1974	6 Rms Riv Vu	Ann Miller	Kenley Players
1979	Vanities	Mary	Burt Reynolds Dinner Theatre
2002	The Goat, or Who Is Sylvia?	Stevie Gray	John Golden Theatre
2004	The Glass Menagerie	Amanda Wingfield	The Kennedy Center
2017	The Glass Menagerie	Amanda Wingfield	Belasco Theatre
2019	All My Sons	Kate Keller	The Old Vic

== Discography ==
=== Singles ===
- "Felicidad" (Billboard No. 94, Cashbox No. 91) / "Find Yourself a Rainbow" – Colgems 1008 – August 1967
- "Follow the Star" (Both sides, promo only) – Colgems 107 – December 1967
- "Golden Days" / "You're a Grand Old Flag" – Colgems 1014 – January 1968
- "Gonna Build a Mountain" / "Months of the Year" (also features Flying Nun stars Madeleine Sherwood and Marge Redmond) – Colgems 1030 – September 1968

=== Album ===
- Star of The Flying Nun—Colgems COM-106 (Mono) / COS-106 (Stereo) – Billboard No. 172, December 1967
