= Anti-Iranian sentiment in the United States =

Anti-Iranian sentiment in the United States (also referred to as anti-Persian sentiment in the United States) refers to the hatred, hostility, prejudice, and discrimination directed against Iranians, Iranian Americans, or the country of Iran within the United States. Historical manifestations of this sentiment range from mid-20th-century residential housing covenants to widespread societal discrimination following the 1979 Iran hostage crisis.

Anti-Iranian bias in the U.S. has been shaped by geopolitical conflicts, political rhetoric, media portrayals, and government policy. Studies and surveys indicate that Iranian Americans have experienced discrimination in airport security, employment, and social interactions. Additionally, scholars and critics have pointed to Hollywood's long-standing depiction of Iranians in films and television—such as Not Without My Daughter (1991), 300 (2007), and Argo (2012)—as contributing to negative stereotypes and cultural demonization.

In the 2020s, heightened military and diplomatic tensions between the U.S. and Iran led to renewed concerns over ethnic profiling, increased border scrutiny by U.S. Customs and Border Protection, and federal entry restrictions on Iranian nationals.

== Residential segregation ==
Between the 1920s and the 1960s, some houses in the Rock Creek Hills neighborhood of Kensington, Maryland, a suburb of Washington, D.C., included anti-Iranian language in racial covenants that were part of property deeds. One deed in Rock Creek Hills declared that homes in the neighborhood "shall never be used or occupied by...negroes or any person or persons, of negro blood or extraction, or to any person of the Semitic Race, blood or origin, or Jews, Armenians, Hebrews, Persians and Syrians, except...partial occupancy of the premises by domestic servants."

== Islamic Revolution ==
=== Iran hostage crisis ===
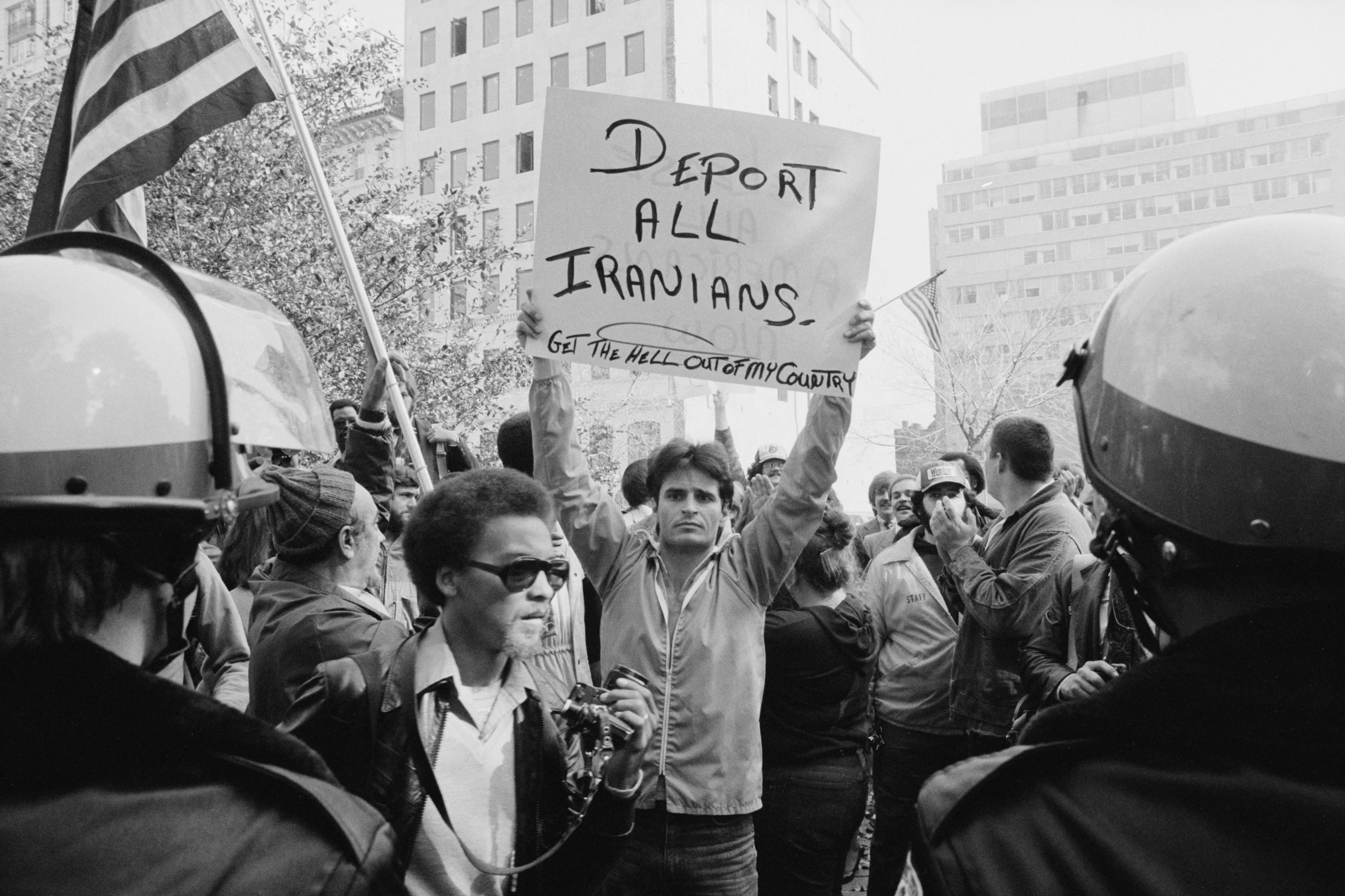
A man is raising a sign that reads "deport all Iranians, get the hell out of my country"during a 1979 Washington, DC, student protest of the Iran hostage crisis.

The 1979 Iran hostage crisis of the US embassy in Tehran precipitated a wave of anti-Iranian sentiment in the United States, against the new Islamic regime and Iranian nationals and immigrants. Even though such sentiments gradually declined after the release of the hostages at the start of 1981. In response, some Iranian immigrants to the US have distanced themselves from their nationality and instead identify primarily on the basis of their ethnic or religious affiliations.

According to the Public Affairs Alliance of Iranian Americans (PAAIA), nearly half of Iranian Americans surveyed in 2008 by Zogby International have themselves experienced or personally know another Iranian American who has experienced discrimination because of their ethnicity or country of origin. The most common types of discrimination reported are airport security, social discrimination, employment or business discrimination, racial profiling and discrimination at the hands of immigration officials.

For three decades (starting in 1979), a BBQ restaurant in Houston, Texas hung an anti-Iranian poster featuring a re-enactment of lynching. This restaurant poster has drawn both protesters and fans to the restaurant in 2011.

Neda Maghbouleh is an American-born Canadian sociologist and author, with a focus on the racialization of migrants from Iran, as well as the entire Middle Eastern and North African region.

=== Iran–United States conflict ===
The escalation of tensions between Iran and the United States beginning in 2020 also produced concerns among Iranian Americans about discrimination and ethnic profiling. Following the United States' killing of Iranian Quds Force commander Qasem Soleimani in January 2020, some Iranian Americans expressed concern that heightened security measures and public rhetoric about Iran could contribute to anti-Iranian sentiment. Lily Tajaddini, an Iranian-American activist in Washington, D.C., told Al Jazeera that rhetoric portraying Iran as a terrorist country could cause people to associate Iranian identity with terrorism.

In January 2020, Iranian Americans returning to the United States through the Peace Arch border crossing in Washington state reported being detained and questioned by U.S. Customs and Border Protection officers following Soleimani's killing. Some reported being questioned about their family members, military service, social-media accounts and travel, with some people reportedly held for several hours. NBC News subsequently obtained a CBP memorandum instructing officers to conduct additional screening of people with connections to Iran, although CBP had initially denied issuing such a directive.

The United States Commission on Civil Rights expressed concern over reports of heightened scrutiny of Iranians and Iranian Americans at airports and borders and called for an investigation into possible discriminatory treatment.

Concerns about discrimination continued in subsequent years. A 2024 survey conducted by the Public Affairs Alliance of Iranian Americans found that 79% of respondents were concerned about increased discrimination against Iranian Americans, compared with about 60% in the comparable 2023 survey. A 2025 PAAIA survey found that 53% of respondents said that they or someone close to them had experienced discrimination because of their ethnicity or national origin; 54% reported bias from airlines or airport security, while 35% reported workplace or business discrimination.

In April 2025, PAAIA reported receiving accounts from Iranian-American travelers who said they had experienced prolonged or repeated questioning at U.S. ports of entry, including reports that travelers had been singled out because they were born in Iran.

In June 2025, the Trump administration issued Proclamation 10949, which suspended the entry of Iranian nationals into the United States, subject to specified exceptions. The proclamation cited national-security and vetting concerns, including Iran's designation by the United States as a state sponsor of terrorism. The restrictions were continued under Proclamation 10998, which took effect on 1 January 2026 and continued to include Iran among the countries subject to full entry restrictions.

== Depictions of Iranians in Hollywood ==
Since the 1980s and especially since the 1990s, Hollywood's depiction of Iranians has vilified them as in television programs such as 24, John Doe, On Wings of Eagles (1986), and Escape From Iran: The Canadian Caper (1981), which was based on a true story. Critics maintain that Hollywood's "tall walls of exclusion and discrimination have yet to crumble when it comes to the movie industry's persistent misrepresentation of Iranians and their collective identity". In March 2013, Iran complained to Hollywood about various films, such as Ben Affleck's Oscar-winning Argo, that portray the country in an unrealistically negative light.

For decades, U.S. entertainment companies have been tried to illustrate Iran as a bloodthirsty country concerned about "bringing down America".

=== Not Without My Daughter (1991) ===
The 1991 film Not Without My Daughter was criticized for its portrayal of Iranian society. Filmed in Israel, it was based on an autobiography of the same name by Betty Mahmoody. In the book and film, an American woman (Mahmoody) traveled to Tehran with her young daughter to visit her Iranian-born family of her husband. Mahmoody's husband then undergoes a strange transformation in Iran, ranging from an educated and sophisticated citizen to an abusive, backwards peasant, eventually deciding that they will not return to the United States. Betty is told that she can divorce him and leave, but their daughter must stay in Tehran under Islamic law. Ultimately, after 18 months in Iran, Betty and her daughter escape to the American embassy in Turkey.

Several Western critics, including Roger Ebert of the Chicago Sun Times and Caryn James of The New York Times, criticized the film for stereotyping Iranians as misogynistic and fanatical. According to Ebert, the film depicts Islamic society "in shrill terms", where women are "willing or unwilling captives of their men", deprived of "what in the West would be considered basic human rights". Furthermore, Ebert says, "No attempt is made—deliberately, I assume—to explain the Muslim point of view, except in rigid sets of commands and rote statements". Ebert then contends, "If a movie of such a vitriolic and spiteful nature were to be made in America about any other ethnic group, it would be denounced as racist and prejudiced."

According to Jane Campbell, the film "only serves to reinforce the media stereotype of Iranians as terrorists who, if not actively bombing public buildings or holding airline passengers hostage, are untrustworthy, irrational, cruel, and barbaric."

The film was also criticized in Iran. A 2002 Islamic Republic News Agency article claimed that the film "[made] smears...against Iran" and "stereotyped Iranians as cruel characters and wife-beaters". In a Finnish documentary, Without My Daughter, film maker Alexis Kouros tells Mahmoody's husband's side of the story, showing Iranian eyewitnesses accusing the Hollywood film of spreading lies and "treasons". Alice Sharif, an American woman living with her Iranian husband in Tehran, accuses Mahmoody and the filmmakers of deliberately attempting to foment anti-Iranian sentiment in the United States.

=== Alexander (2004) ===
The 2004 film Alexander by American director Oliver Stone has been accused of negative and inaccurate portrayal of Persians. In particular, according to historian Kaveh Farrokh, the Persian soldiers who fought at the Battle of Gaugamela are wrongly portrayed as unclean, disorganized, and wearing turbans, in contrast to the well-disciplined Greek army. The destruction of Persepolis was done by Alexander who is a hated figure in eyes of Iranians. According to Lloyd Llewellyn-Jones, Professor of Ancient History at Cardiff University: "Oliver Stone's movie Alexander (2004) displays all the familiar Orientalist notions about the inferiority and picturesqueness of Eastern societies. So much so, indeed, that in terms of its portrayal of East–West relationships, Alexander has to be seen as a stale cultural statement and a worn-out reflection of the continuing Western preoccupation with an imaginary exotic Orient."

=== 300 (2007) ===
The 2007 epic film 300 by Zack Snyder, an adaptation of Frank Miller's 1998 limited comic series of the same name, was criticized for its portrayal of combatants, perceived as racist, in the Persian army at the Battle of Thermopylae. Reviewers in the United States and elsewhere "noted the political overtones of the West-against-Iran story line and the way Persians are depicted as decadent, sexually flamboyant and evil in contrast to the noble Greeks". With bootleg versions of the film already available in Tehran with the film's international release and news of the film's surprising success at the U.S. box office, it prompted widespread anger in Iran. Azadeh Moaveni of Time reported, "All of Tehran was outraged. Everywhere I went yesterday, the talk vibrated with indignation over the film". Newspapers in Iran featured headlines such as "Hollywood declares war on Iranians" and "300 AGAINST 70 MILLION" (Iran's population). Ayende-No, an independent Iranian newspaper, said that "[t]he film depicts Iranians as demons, without culture, feeling or humanity, who think of nothing except attacking other nations and killing people". Four Iranian Members of Parliament have called for Muslim countries to ban the film, and a group of Iranian film makers submitted a letter of protest to UNESCO regarding the film's alleged misrepresentation of Iranian history and culture. Iran's cultural advisor to president Mahmoud Ahmadinejad has called the film an "American attempt for psychological warfare against Iran".

Moaveni identified two factors which may have contributed to the intensity of Iranian indignation over the film. First, she describes the timing of the film's release, on the eve of Norouz (Nowruz), the Persian New Year, as "inauspicious." Second, Iranians tend to view the era depicted in the film as "a particularly noble page in their history". Moaveni also suggests that "the box office success of 300, compared with the relative flop of Alexander (another spurious period epic dealing with Persians), is cause for considerable alarm, signaling ominous U.S. intentions".

According to The Guardian, Iranian critics of 300, ranging from bloggers to government officials, have described the movie "as a calculated attempt to demonise Iran at a time of intensifying U.S. pressure over the country's nuclear programme". An Iranian government spokesman described the film as "hostile behavior which is the result of cultural and psychological warfare". Moaveni reported that the Iranians she interacted with were "adamant that the movie was secretly funded by the U.S. government to prepare Americans for going to war against Iran".

Dana Stevens of Slate states, "If 300, the new battle epic based on the graphic novel by Frank Miller and Lynn Varley, had been made in Germany in the mid-1930s, it would be studied today alongside The Eternal Jew as a textbook example of how race-baiting fantasy and nationalist myth can serve as an incitement to total war. Since it is a product of the post-ideological, post-Xbox 21st century, 300 will instead be talked about as a technical achievement, the next blip on the increasingly blurry line between movies and video games.

=== Argo (2012) ===
Argo has not been shown in public in Iran. It narrates the story of the 1979 Iran hostage crisis and in particular the rescue of six American diplomats by the Central Intelligence Agency. The film faced several reactions from supporters of the Islamic republic and opponents. The film was criticized for a negative portrayal of Iranians, including both revolutionaries and civilians.
