= Mahmoody =

Mahmoody is an Arabic surname that may refer to

- Betty Mahmoody (born 1945), American author and public speaker
- Mahtob Mahmoody (born 1979), American author, daughter of Betty and Sayyed
- Sayyed Bozorg Mahmoody (c.1939–2009), Iranian anesthesiologist, husband of Betty
