= Without My Daughter =

- Directed by: Kari Tervo; Alexis Kouros
- Written by: Alexis Kouros
- Produced by: Kari Tervo; Alexis Kouros
- Starring: Sayyed Bozorg Mahmoody
- Cinematography: Jari Pollari
- Edited by: Riitta Poikselkä
- Music by: Tuomas Kantelinen
- Production companies: Dream Catcher; Tarinatalo; Yle; Arte; TV4 AB; DR
- Release date: 2002
- Country: Finland
- Languages: English; Persian
- Budget: €423,600

Without My Daughter (2002, Finland) is a 90-minute documentary directed by Kari Tervo and Alexis Kouros. It was created by Dr. Sayyed "Moody" Bozorg Mahmoody to contest many of the claims made by his former wife in Not Without My Daughter.

In 1987, Not Without my Daughter was published, based on the story of an American woman, Betty Mahmoody. According to the book, Mahmoody and her daughter, Mahtob, were taken by her Iranian husband, Sayyed Bozorg Mahmoody, for a "two-week holiday" to Iran, and he kept them there against their will. She managed to escape 18 months later over the mountains into Turkey, taking their 5-year-old daughter with her back to the United States after divorce. In 1991, Not Without My Daughter, a film starring Sally Field and Alfred Molina, was released, based on the events described in her book.

== Festival screenings ==
- International Documentary Festival Amsterdam IDGA, Joris Ivens series 2002
- Docpoint International Documentary festival, Helsinki, Finland 2003
- Gothenburg Film Festival, Gothenburg, Sweden 2003
- Fajr Film Festival, Tehran, Iran 2003
- Tampere International Film Festival, Tampere, Finland 2003
- VERA, Short and Documentary Film Festival, Mariehamn, Finland 2003
- East Lansing International Film Festival, Michigan, USA 2003
- Jeon Ju International Film Festival, Seoul, Korea 2003
