= Illegal emigration =

Person moving across national borders in a way that violates emigration laws

Illegal emigration is departure from a country in violation of emigration laws. Countries often seek to regulate who departs a country for diverse reasons, such as stopping suspected criminals from leaving, preventing labor shortages and capital flight, and averting brain drain. The simplest case is when a country prohibits certain persons from physically leaving. Another common situation is when a person legally goes abroad but refuses to return when demanded by their country of origin.

Special cases are when one flees a country as a refugee escaping persecution or, after committing a crime, trying to escape prosecution. However, a person who enters another country as an illegal immigrant may be sent back, and if a criminal, a person may face extradition or prosecution in the other country.

The position of the United Nations is that freedom to emigrate is a human right, part of the right to freedom of movement. According to the Universal Declaration of Human Rights, "Everyone has the right to leave any country, including his own, and to return to his country".

== History ==
A freedom of movement policy was included in the Universal Declaration of Human Rights of 1948.

== Eastern Bloc ==
NVA soldier Conrad Schumann defecting to West Berlin during the Berlin Wall's early days in 1961

The Russian Republic implemented emigration restrictions two months after the Russian Revolution of 1917, with the various Soviet Socialist Republics of the Soviet Union thereafter banning emigration. After the creation of the Eastern Bloc from countries occupied by the Soviet Union during World War II, Eastern Bloc countries instituted emigration bans similar to those in the Soviet Union. After the erection of the Berlin Wall in 1961, emigration mostly halted from east-to-west. A few thousand escape attempts from East Germany occurred, including those by defecting border guards. (More generally, escape by any citizen was considered defection.)

The passport system in the Soviet Union was highly restrictive of any travel external to the Eastern Bloc, and often required approval by the KGB. Soviet Jews and a few others who were not allowed emigrate from the USSR were described by the slang term "refusenik".

During the final stages of World War II, the Soviet Union began the creation of the Eastern Bloc by directly annexing several countries as Soviet Socialist Republics. These included Eastern Poland (incorporated into two different SSRs), Latvia (became Latvia SSR), Estonia (became Estonian SSR), Lithuania (became Lithuania SSR), part of eastern Finland (became Karelo-Finnish SSR) and eastern Romania (became the Moldavian SSR). Other states were converted into Soviet Satellite states, such as the People's Republic of Poland, the People's Republic of Hungary, the Czechoslovak Socialist Republic, the People's Republic of Romania, the People's Republic of Albania, and later East Germany from the Soviet zone of German occupation.

By the early 1950s, the Soviet approach to controlling national movement was emulated by most of the rest of the Eastern Bloc (along with China, Mongolia and North Korea). Up until 1952, the lines between East Germany and the western occupied zones could be easily crossed in most places. Accordingly, before 1961, most of that east–west flow took place between East and West Germany, with over 3.5 million East Germans emigrating to West Germany. On August 13, 1961, barbed-wire barrier that would become the Berlin Wall separating East and West Berlin was erected by East Germany. Two days later, police and army engineers began to construct a more permanent concrete wall.

In East Germany, the term Republikflucht (flight from the Republic) was used to describe anyone wishing to leave to non-socialist countries. A propaganda booklet published by the Socialist Unity Party of Germany (SED) in 1955 for the use of party agitators outlined the seriousness of 'flight from the republic', stating "leaving the GDR is an act of political and moral backwardness and depravity", and "workers throughout Germany will demand punishment for those who today leave the German Democratic Republic, the strong bastion of the fight for peace, to serve the deadly enemy of the German people, the imperialists and militarists".

Famous defectors include Joseph Stalin's daughter Svetlana Alliluyeva, fighter pilot Viktor Belenko, U.N. Under-Secretary General Arkady Shevchenko, chess grand master Viktor Korchnoi, and ballet stars Mikhail Baryshnikov, Natalia Makarova and Alexander Godunov. Famous East German defectors include author Wolfgang Leonhard, East German soldier Conrad Schumann who was photographed jumping the Berlin wall while under construction, and a number of European football players, including Jörg Berger. While media sources often reported high level defections, non-prominent defections usually went unreported.

== North Korea ==
North Korea strictly prohibits its citizens from leaving without permission. North Koreans caught leaving the country without permission or helping others leave can be imprisoned in labor camps or even executed. The most common route out of North Korea is through the Chinese border, from where North Koreans who wish to get to South Korea must leave China and go to third countries for processing by South Korean diplomatic missions, as China does not recognize the refugee status of North Korean defectors and treats them as economic migrants, with those caught in China typically sent back to North Korea. Despite the risks, numerous North Koreans defect each year.

== Cuba ==
Previously, the Cuban government forbade its citizens to leave or return to Cuba without first obtaining permission from the government. In a translation by Human Rights Watch, under Cuba's criminal code, individuals who, "without completing legal formalities, leave or take actions in preparation for leaving the national territory" faced prison sentences of one to three years in prison. From 1985 to 1994 the number of illegal emigrants is estimated to 82,500, with an additional 7,500 up to the mid-2000. Even discussing illegal emigration carried a six-month prison sentence.

However, Law-Decree 302, published in the Official Gazette of the Republic of Cuba on October 16, 2012, went into effect on January 14, 2013. This immigration law eliminates the need for an exit permit but increased passport costs to 100 CUC, the equivalent of 5 months of average salary.

== Iran ==
Under Article 18 of the Iranian Passport Law, a married Iranian woman requires the written permission of her husband to obtain a passport and leave the country. And under Article 976, Clause 6 of the Iranian Civil Code, any woman of any nationality married to an Iranian man automatically becomes an Iranian citizen and is therefore subject to these regulations. Betty Mahmoody, married to Iranian Sayyed Bozorg Mahmoody, was trapped in Iran after her husband had decided that they would stay there during a two-week vacation. She had to escape to Turkey aided by smugglers because she would not have legally been allowed to leave Iran without first obtaining a divorce from her husband, who would have gained full custody of their daughter, Mahtob Mahmoody.

According to the law of the government of Iran, Iranian males older than 18 years old are not allowed to leave the country unless they serve Iran armed forces for 24 months. This has caused a huge number of Iranian students and the young population to leave the country through illegal channels.

== Portugal ==
Under the dictatorship that ruled Portugal until 1974 (Estado Novo), individual freedom to emigrate from Portugal was subordinated to the aims and interests of the nation. The 1933 Constitution says that "[t]he state has the right and the obligation to coordinate and regulate the economic and social life of the Nation with the objective of populating the national territories, protecting emigrants, and disciplining emigration." The state tried to attain three key goals with this policy: meet labor needs, satisfy interests in Africa, and ensure benefits from emigrant remittances. At least 36 percent of Portuguese emigrants between 1950 and 1988 left the country illegally.

Following the Carnation Revolution, a new democratic constitution was promulgated on 2 April 1976, of which Article 44, section 2 reads:

Everyone is guaranteed the right to emigrate or to leave the national territory, and the right to return.

== Vietnam ==
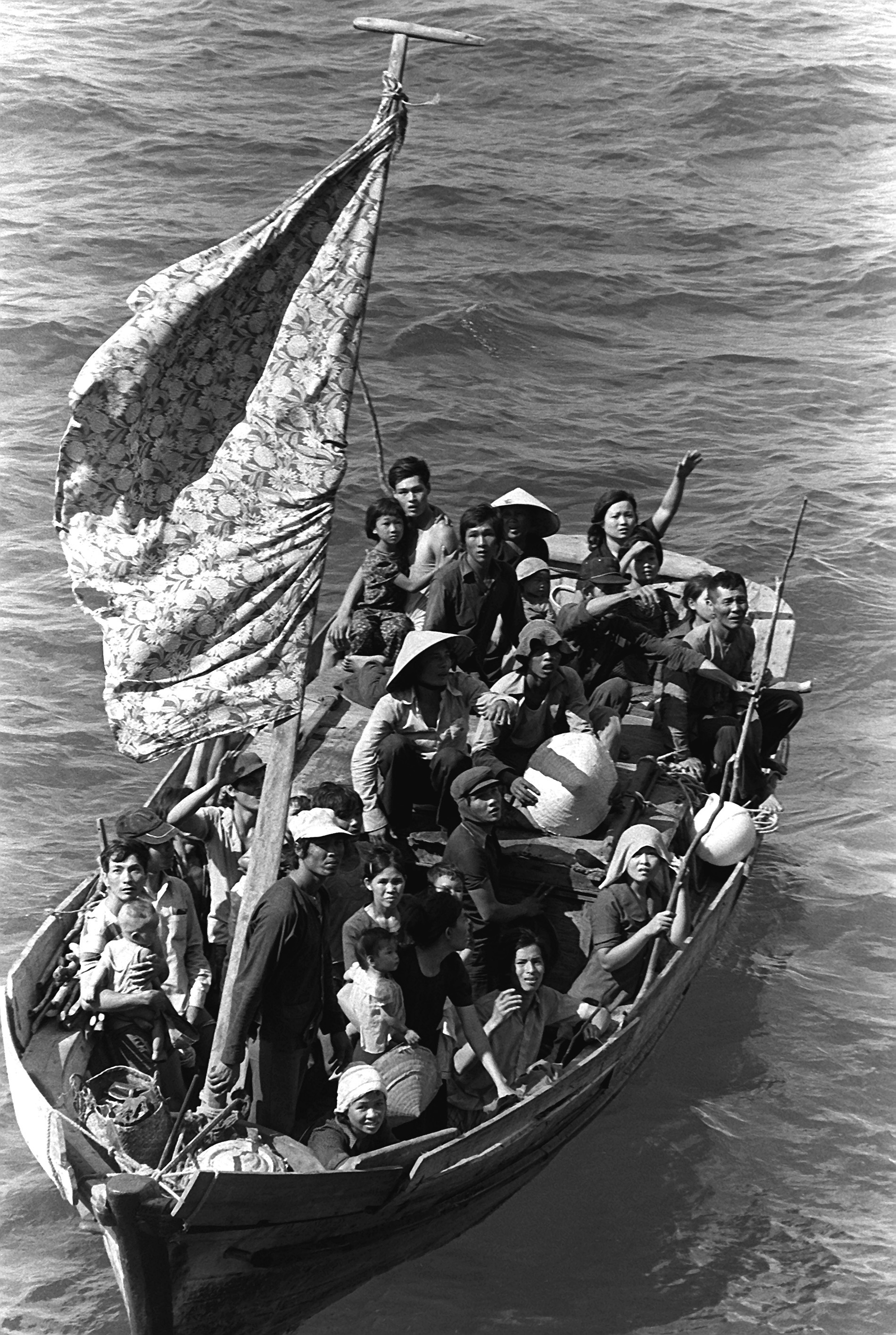
Vietnamese boat people awaiting rescue

Following the end of the Vietnam War in 1975, repressive actions by the Vietnamese government, economic sanctions, and further conflicts (Third Indochina War) with neighboring countries caused a surge of refugees called "boat people" and an international humanitarian crisis, with Southeast Asian countries increasingly unwilling to accept more "boat people". After negotiations and an international conference in 1979, Vietnam agreed to limit the flow of people leaving the country. The Southeast Asian countries agreed to admit the boat people temporarily, and the rest of the world, especially more developed countries, agreed to assume most of the costs of caring for the boat people and resettle them in their countries. Many of the refugees failed to survive the passage, facing danger from pirates, over-crowded boats, and storms.

== Myanmar ==
According to Human Rights Watch, the government of Myanmar has tightly restricted the number of Muslims allowed to travel to Mecca for the Haj pilgrimage. Muslims claimed they continue to have difficulties getting passports to travel abroad.

== Tunisia ==
In Tunisia per 2001, authorities continued to deny passports to less prominent critics as well as to family members of political prisoners and expatriate activists.

== Child support ==
=== Australia and New Zealand ===
Australia and New Zealand have a travel ban for people who owe child support.

=== Costa Rica ===
People who owe child support are prevented from leaving Costa Rica.

=== United States ===
If a person owes more than $2,500 in child support, they cannot get their US passport renewed, and therefore will be unable to leave the United States and may be deported back to the United States for not having a valid US passport.

== Restrictive exit visas ==
Lebanon, Saudi Arabia, Jordan, United Arab Emirates, Iraq, Kuwait, Oman, Qatar, Nepal, Russia and Czech Republic may require special exit visas for foreign workers, departing workers, citizens, or visitors.

== Fiction ==
- The Sound of Music – 1965 movie fictionalizing the von-Trapp family fleeing the Nazis in Austria of 1938 and secretly escaping over the Alps to freedom in Switzerland (Italy in the events it was based on)
- Balseros – documentary about escaping Cuba on rafts

== See also ==
- Coyote
- Freedom of movement
- Illegal immigration
- Refusenik
- Eastern Bloc emigration and defection
- Sakoku
- Stowaway
- Look out circular
