= Marek Smurzyński =

Marek Smurzyński (1954 – 12 December 2009) was a Polish translator, Persian language speaker and translator, Persian literature expert, and an Iranologist.

== Bibliography ==
- (in Polish) Smurzyński, Marek. A sententious character of the Persian ghazal as its structural feature. 1987.
- (in Polish) Smurzyński, Marek. Granice jawnego i utajonego w kulturze perskiej. 1988.
- (in Polish) Mahmoody, Betty. O czarnej niewdzięczności szczerego wyznania. Smurzyński Marek. 1992.
- (in Polish) Sepehri, Sohrab. Głosy u brzegu wód. Smurzyński Marek. Łódź: Stowarzyszenie Literackie im. K.K. Baczyńskiego, 1993.
- (in Polish) Dżalaloddin Rumi. W mgnieniu słów. Marek Smurzyński. Wydawnictwo Homini, 2008. ISBN 978-83-89598-63-9.
- (in Persian) Adam-ha ru-ye pol. Wybór poezji Wisławy Szymborskiej. Marek Smurzyński, Shahram Sheydaee, Choka Chakad, Wydawnictwo Nashr-e Markaz, Teheran, (w jęz. perskim). ISBN 964-305-294-X, 1997.
