= Illegal migration =

Illegal migration can refer to:

- Illegal immigration
- Illegal emigration
