= Not Without My Daughter (book) =

1987 book by Betty Mahmoody

- First edition
- Author: Betty Mahmoody, with William Hoffer
- Language: English
- Genre: Biography
- Publisher: St. Martin’s Press
- Publication date: 1987
- Publication place: United States
- Pages: 420
- ISBN: 0-312-01073-7

Not Without My Daughter is a 1987 memoir by Betty Mahmoody detailing the escape of Betty and her daughter, Mahtob, from Betty's abusive ex-husband in Iran.

In 1977, Betty married Dr. Sayyed Bozorg "Moody" Mahmoody. In 1984, when their daughter was four years old, Betty reluctantly agreed to accompany her husband on a two week vacation to Iran in order for his family to meet Mahtob. However, at the end of the two weeks, Moody decided that he, his wife and daughter would remain in Iran. Betty was trapped in Iran and could not return to the United States. The rest of Not Without My Daughter recounted Betty and Mahtob's escape from Iran and their return to the United States.

While the story was true, the author changed certain aspects of the story in order to protect those who aided her and her daughter in their escape. She wrote the following:

This is a true story.
The characters are authentic, the events real. But the names and identifying details of certain individuals have been disguised in order to protect them and their families against the possibility of arrest and execution by the government of the Islamic Republic of Iran. These are: Hamid, the owner of a menswear store; Judy, an American woman married to an Iranian; Judy's brother-in-law, Ali; Judy's friends, Rasheed, Trish, Suzanne; the schoolteacher Mrs. Azahr; the mysterious Miss Alavi; Amahl and the smuggler, Mosehn.

== Plot ==
On August 3, 1984, Moody, Betty, and Mahtob had spent two days traveling from their home in Detroit to Moody's native country of Iran. In preparation for their arrival, Betty, at Moody's request, gave her American passport to him in order for it not to be confiscated by the customs official. When they had landed in Tehran, Moody's family had gathered at the airport to meet them and showered them with gifts. The family gave Betty a montoe and a roosarie (traditional female clothes in Iran) and instructed her to wear them whenever she went outside their home. During the next two weeks, Betty and Mahtob longed for the vacation to be over. They had difficulty adjusting to the Iranian lifestyle. They also faced familial challenges: Moody's sister, Ameh Bozorg, (literally "great aunt"), who was their host, viewed Betty with contempt, simply for being an American and holding to American ideals. Moody's attitude toward Betty also changed: He forced her to abide by increasingly strict Iranian customs; he lied to her; he claimed that she was lying whenever she complained; he ignored her and their daughter for days at a time; he even blinded himself to the oppression of women in Iran.

The day before their scheduled return to the United States, one of Moody's relatives went to the airport in order to make the preparations for their departure. He informed them that, since Betty had an American passport, she needed to turn in her passport to the airport officials three days before her departure. When she confronted Moody about not turning in her passport, he informed her that he had decided to stay and that Betty and Mahtob would remain in Iran for the rest of their lives. Betty tried to get help from Moody's family, but they approved of Moody's actions and refused to help. Moody forced Betty to call her parents to let them know that she would be staying in Iran for a while longer. About a week later, when Betty was alone, her parents called and gave her the address of the U.S. Interests Section of the Swiss Embassy in Tehran. Betty waited for a chance to contact the Swiss Embassy. Her desire to leave Iran was magnified by Moody's physical abuse. Even in public, any injury or violence toward Betty and Mahtob was allowed. The Iranian laws granted Moody absolute authority over his wife and daughter.

In September, while Moody was away, Betty and Mahtob traveled to the Swiss Embassy and spoke to Helen. Helen informed them that, since Betty's husband was an Iranian, Iran's laws dictated that she, too, had become an Iranian citizen. When Betty and Mahtob returned to the house, Moody threatened to kill her if she left again and commanded the rest of the family to prevent her from leaving. Betty's every move was being watched. Betty realized that she and Mahtob could not escape with the surveillance. She reasoned that the only way that Moody would stop watching her was for her to convince him that she was willing to stay in Iran. Her attitude improved, and she convinced him to move in with different relatives. Betty started helping around the house and preparing dinner. Moody accompanied her on all her errands. Eventually, he claimed to not have the time and told her to go herself. On one of these occasions, she befriended the owner of a menswear store named Hamid. Hamid sympathized with Betty, and offered her use of his telephone if she needed it.

While watching Mahtob play in the park, Betty encountered Judy, another American woman married to an Iranian. Betty relayed her plight to Judy, who promised to help. A couple days later, Judy invited Betty to a party where she could talk to Judy's friend Rasheed about finding a way to escape the country. Rasheed asked her to call him in two weeks. In December, two weeks after the dinner party, Rasheed informed Betty that the smuggler was unwilling to take a woman and a child on the journey over the mountains into Turkey, especially during the winter. After the New Year in 1985, Betty traveled to the embassy to speak with Helen. Helen had Betty and Mahtob fill out applications for new passports. When Betty asked about a way for her and Mahtob to be smuggled out of Iran, Helen warned against trusting smugglers, especially those willing to smuggle them across the treacherous Turkish border.

In late June, 1985, Moody, Betty, and Mahtob moved into their own apartment, limiting Moody's surveillance and giving Betty more freedom. Betty contacted Rasheed again, but his friend still refused to take a child. One day, an unnamed individual instructed Betty to go to an address and ask for the manager Amahl, who would find a way for both Betty and Mahtob to escape. Amahl informed Betty that he had planned a route and was attempting to work out the details. However, after several months, Amahl was still trying to construct a way of escape.

The original plan was to fly Betty and Mahtob to Bandar Abbas from Tehran. Once there, they would take a boat and travel across the Persian Gulf to one of the Gulf Arab States. Another optional plan being developed by Ahmal was to fly Betty and her daughter to Zahidan. At Zahidan, they would be smuggled into the Pakistani province of Balochistan, which borders Iran. From Balochistan's largest city, Quetta, they would be flown to the port city of Karachi in the Sindh province and transit back to America. Neither of these plans materialized because Betty escaped from Moody early. Betty also mentions in the book that Ahmal had informed her that the cold weather and snowfall in Balochistan was more severe than usual and reports of bandits abducting travelers meant putting them at further risk, so he had reservations of using that route.

In mid January 1986, Betty learned that her father was dying. Moody insisted that Betty return to the U.S., but demanded that Mahtob remain in Iran. Despite her refusal to leave without Mahtob, Moody booked her a flight on January 31. On January 29, 1986, Moody, an anesthetist, was unexpectedly called to the hospital. Knowing that this was her last chance before she was forced to leave Iran without her daughter, Betty called Amahl, asking for instructions. He directed them to an apartment where they remained for three days as Amahl completed their travel arrangements. They were to travel through Turkey; the smugglers would take them from Tehran to Tabriz and then to Van. From there, Betty and Mahtob would need to find a way to Ankara and get to the U.S. Embassy.

On January 31, the smugglers drove Betty and Mahtob to a small village beyond Tabriz, where they spent the night. For the next day and most of the night, they used horses to cross the snowy, mountainous border into Turkey, where Betty nearly succumbed to exhaustion and hypothermia. They spent the rest of the night in a small hut and traveled to Van in the morning. Betty and Mahtob found a bus and spent the next 32 hours traveling to Ankara. Once they arrived, the U.S. Embassy granted them sanctuary and helped them get airline tickets for a trip back to the U.S. later that day. On February 7, 1986, Betty and Mahtob finally arrived back home in Michigan, after spending eighteen months trapped in Iran before the divorce to Moody.

== Reception ==
Moody denied many of the claims made by his wife in "Not Without my Daughter". He collaborated with Alexis Kouros to create a documentary, Without My Daughter, to counter the claims in Betty's book.

In the book, she denied several times that she was propagating a negative stereotype of Iranians. She explained that, "Iranians could not be placed into a single category of fanatical American haters". She also mentioned several instances of women who were not mistreated by their husbands, but also maintained, throughout the book, that most smugglers who helped people escape Iran could not be trusted. Nevertheless, the book and the movie of the same name have been criticized for their representation of Muslim Iranians and of their culture.

The book was nominated for a Pulitzer Prize.

A tie-in edition of the book, to coincide with the 1990s film of the same name, was released by St. Martin's Press in 1991, complete with cover art depicting Sally Field as Betty and Sheila Rosenthal as Mahtob dressed in nightgowns while they pray together; this edition contained several rare black-and-white interior photographic screenshots from the film, including one of the actors smiling, in contrast to the stern fundamentalist roles they played. This edition of the book has since fallen out of print.

A further book was released in 2015, My Name is Mahtob written by Mahtob Mahmoody with the tagline Not without my Daughter continues.
