= List of awards and nominations received by Sally Field =

Sally Field awards and nominations
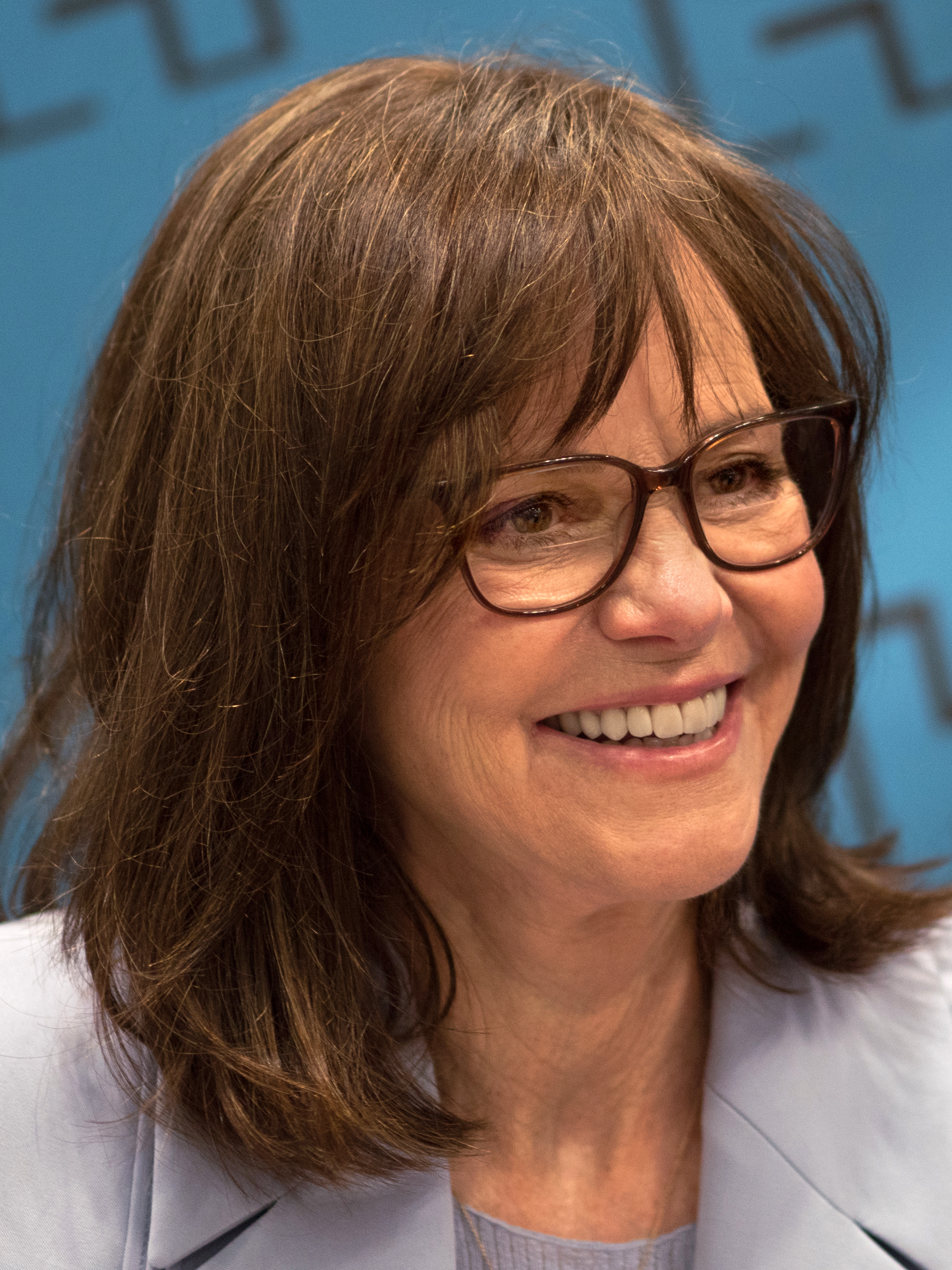
- Field in 2018
Awards and nominations
Award	Wins	Nominations
Academy Awards	2	3
Actor Awards	1	9
BAFTA Awards	0	2
Critics' Choice Awards	0	2
Emmy Awards	4	10
Golden Globe Awards	2	11
Tony Awards	0	1

Totals (Note: Certain award groups do not simply award one winner. They acknowledge several different recipients, have runners-up, and have third place. Since this is a specific recognition and is different from losing an award, runner-up mentions are considered wins in this award tally. For simplification and to avoid errors, each award in this list has been presumed to have had a prior nomination.)
- Wins: 20
- Nominations: 62

Sally Field is an American actress known for her roles on stage and screen. She has received two Academy Awards, two Actor Awards, four Emmy Awards, two Golden Globe Awards as well as nominations for two BAFTA Awards, two Critics Choice Awards and a Tony Award. She received a star on the Hollywood Walk of Fame in 2014, Kennedy Center Honor in 2019, and a Screen Actors Guild Life Achievement Award in 2023.

Field gained stardom for her comedic role in the action road film Smokey and the Bandit (1977) for which she was nominated for the Golden Globe Award for Best Actress in a Motion Picture – Musical or Comedy. She then gained acclaim for her leading role as the titular factory worker turned union organizer in the drama Norma Rae (1979) for which she won the Academy Award for Best Actress, the Cannes Film Festival Award for Best Actress, and the Golden Globe Award for Best Actress in a Motion Picture – Drama. She then portrayed a mother struggling during the Great Depression in Places in the Heart (1984) earning her second Academy Award for Best Actress and Golden Globe Award for Best Actress in a Motion Picture – Drama. For her role as Mama Gump in the Robert Zemeckis comedy-drama epic Forrest Gump (1994) she was nominated for the BAFTA Award for Best Actress in a Supporting Role. She also portrayed Mary Todd Lincoln in the Steven Spielberg directed historical drama Lincoln (2012) for which she was nominated for the Academy Award, the BAFTA Award, and the Golden Globe Award. She was also Golden Globe-nominated for her roles in the films Absence of Malice (1981), Kiss Me Goodbye (1982), Murphy's Romance (1985).

On television, Field played the title role in the NBC film Sybil (1976) earning the Primetime Emmy Award for Outstanding Lead Actress in a Limited or Anthology Series or Movie. She played a woman with bipolar in the NBC medical series ER (2001–2003) for which she earned the Primetime Emmy Award for Outstanding Guest Actress in a Drama Series. She portrayed Nora Walker in the ABC drama series Brothers & Sisters (2006–2011) for which she won the Primetime Emmy Award for Outstanding Lead Actress in a Drama Series and the Actor Award for Outstanding Performance by a Female Actor in a Drama Series. For her role as an elderly widow in the Netflix film Remarkably Bright Creatures (2026) she won the Primetime Emmy Award for Outstanding Lead Actress in a Limited or Anthology Series or Movie. She was Emmy-nominated for her roles in the NBC period drama film A Woman of Independent Means (1995) and in the Showtime television film A Cooler Climate (1999).

On stage, she played the leading role of Amanda Wingfield in the Broadway revival production of the Tennessee Williams play The Glass Menagerie (2017), for which she was nominated for the Tony Award for Best Leading Actress in a Play

== Major associations ==
=== Academy Awards ===
Year	Category	Nominated work	Result	Ref.
1980	Best Actress	Norma Rae	Won	
1985	Best Actress	Places in the Heart	Won	
2013	Best Supporting Actress	Lincoln	Nominated	

=== Actor Awards ===
Year	Category	Nominated work	Result	Ref.
1994	Outstanding Actress in a Supporting Role	Forrest Gump	Nominated	
1995	Outstanding Actress in a Miniseries or Television Movie	A Woman of Independent Means	Nominated	
2000	Outstanding Actress in a Drama Series	ER	Nominated	
1999	Outstanding Actress in a Miniseries or Television Movie	A Cooler Climate	Nominated	
2000	Outstanding Actress in a Miniseries or Television Movie	David Copperfield	Nominated	
2007	Outstanding Actress in a Drama Series	Brothers & Sisters	Nominated	
2008	Outstanding Actress in a Drama Series	Brothers & Sisters	Won	
2012	Outstanding Cast in a Motion Picture	Lincoln	Nominated	
2012	Outstanding Actress in a Supporting Role	Lincoln	Nominated	
2023	Screen Actors Guild Life Achievement Award	—N/a	Honored	

=== BAFTA Awards ===
Year	Category	Nominated work	Result	Ref.
British Academy Film Awards
1995	Best Actress in a Supporting Role	Forrest Gump	Nominated	
2013	Best Actress in a Supporting Role	Lincoln	Nominated	

=== Critics' Choice Awards ===
Year	Category	Nominated work	Result	Ref.
Critics' Choice Movie Awards
2012	Best Supporting Actress	Lincoln	Nominated	
2016	Best Actress in a Comedy	Hello, My Name is Doris	Nominated	

=== Emmy Awards ===
Year	Category	Nominated work	Result	Ref.
Primetime Emmy Awards
1977	Outstanding Lead Actress in a Drama or Comedy Special	Sybil	Won	
1995	Outstanding Miniseries	A Woman of Independent Means	Nominated	
1995	Outstanding Lead Actress in a Miniseries or a Special	A Woman of Independent Means	Nominated	
2000	Outstanding Lead Actress in a Miniseries or a Movie	A Cooler Climate	Nominated	
2001	Outstanding Guest Actress in a Drama Series	ER	Won	
2003	Outstanding Guest Actress in a Drama Series	ER	Nominated	
2007	Outstanding Lead Actress in a Drama Series	Brothers & Sisters	Won	
2008	Outstanding Lead Actress in a Drama Series	Brothers & Sisters	Nominated	
2009	Outstanding Lead Actress in a Drama Series	Brothers & Sisters	Nominated	
2026	Outstanding Lead Actress in a Limited Series or Movie	Remarkably Bright Creatures	Won	

=== Golden Globe Awards ===
Year	Category	Nominated work	Result	Ref.
1978	Best Actress in a Motion Picture – Musical or Comedy	Smokey and the Bandit	Nominated	
1980	Best Actress in a Motion Picture – Drama	Norma Rae	Won	
1982	Best Actress in a Motion Picture – Drama	Absence of Malice	Nominated	
1984	Best Actress in a Motion Picture – Musical or Comedy	Kiss Me Goodbye	Nominated	
1985	Best Actress in a Motion Picture – Drama	Places in the Heart	Won	
1986	Best Actress in a Motion Picture – Musical or Comedy	Murphy's Romance	Nominated	
1990	Best Actress in a Motion Picture – Drama	Steel Magnolias	Nominated	
1996	Best Actress in a Miniseries or Television Film	A Woman of Independent Means	Nominated	
2008	Best Actress in a Television Series – Drama	Brothers & Sisters	Nominated	
2009	Best Actress in a Television Series – Drama	Brothers & Sisters	Nominated	
2013	Best Supporting Actress in a Motion Picture	Lincoln	Nominated	

=== Tony Awards ===
Year	Category	Nominated work	Result	Ref.
2017	Best Actress in a Play	The Glass Menagerie	Nominated	

== Miscellaneous awards ==
Year	Association	Category	Nominated work	Result
1979	Cannes Film Festival	Best Actress	Norma Rae	Won
1979	Los Angeles Film Critics Association Awards	Best Actress	Norma Rae	Won
1979	National Board of Review	Best Actress	Norma Rae	Won
1979	New York Film Critics Circle Awards	Best Actress	Norma Rae	Won
1979	National Society of Film Critics Awards	Best Actress	Norma Rae	Won
1982	People's Choice Awards	Favorite Motion Picture Actress	Absence of Malice	Won
1986	People's Choice Awards	Favorite Motion Picture Actress	Murphy's Romance	Nominated
1995	Kids' Choice Awards	Favorite Movie Actress	Forrest Gump	Nominated
2007	Satellite Awards	Best Actress – Television Series Drama	Brothers & Sisters	Nominated
2008	People's Choice Awards	Favorite Female Television Star	Brothers & Sisters	Nominated
2008	Satellite Awards	Best Actress – Television Series Drama	Brothers & Sisters	Nominated
2008	People's Choice Awards	Favorite Female Television Star	Brothers & Sisters	Nominated
2012	Boston Society of Film Critics Awards	Best Supporting Actress	Lincoln	Won
2012	Chicago Film Critics Association Awards	Best Supporting Actress	Lincoln	Nominated
2012	Dallas-Fort Worth Film Critics Association Awards	Best Supporting Actress	Lincoln	Won
2012	New York Film Critics Circle Awards	Best Supporting Actress	Lincoln	Won
2012	Southeastern Film Critics Association Awards	Best Supporting Actress	Lincoln	Nominated
2012	National Society of Film Critics Awards	Best Supporting Actress	Lincoln	Nominated
2012	Online Film Critics Society Awards	Best Supporting Actress	Lincoln	Nominated
2016	Women Film Critics Circle	Best Comedic Actress	Hello, My Name Is Doris	Nominated
2017	Broadway.com Audience Award	Favorite Leading Actress in a Play	The Glass Menagerie	Won
2017	Drama League Award	Distinguished Performance	The Glass Menagerie	Nominated
2017	Outer Critics Circle Award	Outstanding Actress in a Play	The Glass Menagerie	Nominated
2026	6th Astra TV Awards	Best Actress in a Limited Series or TV Movie	Remarkably Bright Creatures	Won
