= Harry J. Ufland =

American film producer (1936–2018)

- Born: March 12, 1936; Manhattan, New York, U.S.
- Died: March 2, 2018 (aged 81); Playa Vista, Los Angeles, California, U.S.
- Occupations: Talent agent, film producer
- Years active: 1958–2013
- Spouses: Mary Ufland Cossette (divorced) Mary Jane Ufland (m. 1985)
- Children: 6

Harry J. Ufland (March 12, 1936 – March 2, 2018) was an American talent agent and film producer. He was best known for producing the Martin Scorsese film The Last Temptation of Christ (1988).

== Biography ==
Ufland was born in Manhattan on March 12, 1936. He was raised in the uptown neighborhood of Washington Heights, Manhattan.

Ufland began his career as a talent agent at the William Morris Agency, where he worked from 1958 to 1974. It was during that tenure when he met Martin Scorsese in 1966. He also worked as an agent at CMA/ICM from 1974 to 1976 before starting his own agency, The Ulfland Agency. In addition to Scorsese, Ufland also represented other Hollywood figures including Robert De Niro, Ridley Scott, Martin Sheen, Harvey Keitel, Peter Bogdanovich, Catherine Deneuve, Charles Grodin, Jodie Foster, Cher, Joe Pesci, Martin Brest, Marcello Mastroianni, Tony Scott, Adrian Lyne, Jonathan Kaplan, Ray Liotta, Joel Grey and Donald Sutherland.

Ufland was thanked in the credits of Scorsese's 1973 film Mean Streets. He also appeared on screen as the agent of Jerry Lewis's character in Scorsese's The King of Comedy (1982). Film producer Barry Spikings thanked Ufland in his acceptance speech for winning the Academy Award for Best Picture for The Deer Hunter (1978). Ufland also packaged the films Mean Streets, Taxi Driver (1976), Raging Bull (1980) and Blade Runner (1982).

In 1982, Ufland founded Ufland-Roth Productions with Joe Roth. Together they produced Moving Violations (1985), Off Beat (1986) and Streets of Gold (1986), the latter directed by Roth. Ufland served as an executive producer of the Scorsese-helmed Michael Jackson music video Bad. Other films in which Ufland served as producer or executive producer include The Last Temptation of Christ (1988), Not Without My Daughter (1991), Night and the City (1992), One True Thing (1998), Snow Falling on Cedars (1999) and Crazy/Beautiful (2001). The last films he produced were the television film Keep the Faith, Baby (2002) and the feature film The Big Wedding (2013).

Ufland was a professor at Dodge College of Film and Media Arts at Chapman University from 2011 until his death in 2018.

From 1985 until his death, Ufland was married to Mary Jane and they had a son, Tommy. Ufland also has five children, John, Anne, Christopher, Jennifer, and Joslin from a previous marriage to Mary Ufland Cossette.

Ufland died of brain cancer on March 2, 2018, in his home in Playa Vista, Los Angeles. He was 81.

== Select filmography ==
He was a producer in all films unless otherwise noted.

=== Film ===
| Year | Film | Credit | Notes |
|---|---|---|---|
| 1985 | Moving Violations | | |
| 1986 | Off Beat | | |
| 1986 | Where the River Runs Black | | |
| 1986 | Streets of Gold | | |
| 1988 | The Last Temptation of Christ | Executive producer | |
| 1991 | Not Without My Daughter | | |
| 1992 | Night and the City | Executive producer | |
| 1993 | Freaked | | |
| 1998 | One True Thing | | |
| 1999 | Snow Falling on Cedars | | |
| 2001 | Crazy/Beautiful | | |
| 2013 | The Big Wedding | | Final film as a producer |

As an actor

| Year | Film | Role |
|---|---|---|
| 1982 | The King of Comedy | Langford's Agent |

Thanks

| Year | Film | Role |
|---|---|---|
| 1973 | Mean Streets | Special thanks |
| 1984 | The Stone Boy | Special thanks |
| 2011 | The Inheritance | Special thanks |

=== Television ===
| Year | Title | Notes |
|---|---|---|
| 2002 | Keep the Faith, Baby | Television film |
