= Off Beat (1986 film) =

1986 film by Michael Dinner

- Theatrical release poster
- Directed by: Michael Dinner
- Screenplay by: Mark Medoff
- Story by: Dezsö Magyar
- Produced by: Joe Roth; Harry J. Ufland
- Starring: Judge Reinhold; Meg Tilly; Cleavant Derricks; Jacques d'Amboise; Harvey Keitel
- Cinematography: Carlo Di Palma
- Edited by: Dede Allen; Angelo Corrao
- Music by: James Horner
- Production companies: Touchstone Films; Silver Screen Partners II
- Distributed by: Buena Vista Distribution Co.
- Release date: April 11, 1986
- Running time: 92 minutes
- Country: United States
- Language: English
- Budget: $10 million
- Box office: $4,117,061 (USA)

Off Beat is a 1986 American comedy film about Joe Gower, a young librarian who impersonates a police officer. The film was directed by Michael Dinner, and stars Judge Reinhold, Meg Tilly, Cleavant Derricks and Harvey Keitel.

== Plot ==
Joe Gower is a likable librarian who glides around his job on roller skates. He has a strict boss, Neil Pepper, and a good friend who's a cop, Abe Washington. A mistake Joe makes inadvertently messes up Washington's undercover work. Joe now owes him a favor, but is unprepared for what Washington wants. A police charity event needs officers to dress in drag, but because Washington wants no part of that, he asks Joe to take his place.

A reluctant Joe decides to go through with the audition, expecting to be so bad that he won't be cast in the show. When he goes there and meets an attractive policewoman, Rachel Wareham, it changes everything. Joe not only does the show, he continues to keep from Rachel the fact that he's not a real cop.

As luck would have it, Joe finds himself in the midst of actual crimes. He encounters criminals, like bank robber Mickey, and is caught in a crossfire as to which would be worse, being exposed as someone impersonating a police officer or being shot by a crook.

== Cast ==
- Judge Reinhold as Joe Gower
- Meg Tilly as Rachel Wareham
- John Turturro as Neil Pepper
- Cleavant Derricks as Abe Washington
- Jacques d'Amboise as August
- Harvey Keitel as Mickey
- Joe Mantegna as Pete Peterson
- Amy Wright as Mary Ellen Gruenwald
- Anthony Zerbe as Mr. Wareham
- Julie Bovasso as Mrs. Wareham
- Victor Argo as Leon
- Penn Jillette as Norman
- Mel Winkler as Earl
- Irving Metzman as Deluca
- Mike Starr as James Bonnell
- Shawn Elliott as Hector
- Stanley Simmonds as Pud
- Nancy Giles as Celestine
- Paul Butler as Jordan
- John Kapelos as Lou Wareham
- William Sadler as Dickson
- Chris Noth as Ely Wareham Jr.
- Austin Pendleton as Gun Shop Salesman
- James Tolkan as Harry
- Fred Gwynne as Police Commissioner

== Release ==
The film was theatrically released on April 11, 1986.

== Critical response ==
In his review of April 11, 1986, Roger Ebert of the Chicago Sun-Times gave Off Beat three-and-a-half stars out of a possible four, describing it as one of the year's best comedies. Judge Reinhold later said the film was "a little love story they tried to sell as a ... comedy. It wasn't marketed right. It wasn't a Police Academy clone movie, (but) people got the impression that it was. It was a pretty tame movie, by those standards, but I was proud of it."
