= Beautiful (2000 film) =

- Theatrical release poster
- Directed by: Sally Field
- Written by: Jon Bernstein
- Produced by: John Bertolli; B.J. Rack
- Starring: Minnie Driver; Joey Lauren Adams; Leslie Stefanson; Bridgette Wilson; Kathleen Turner; Hallie Kate Eisenberg; Sally Field
- Cinematography: Robert D. Yeoman
- Edited by: Debra Neil-Fisher
- Music by: John Frizzell
- Production companies: Flashpoint (I); Fogwood Films; Prosperity Pictures; Two Drivers Productions Company
- Distributed by: Destination Films
- Release dates: September 11, 2000 (TIFF); September 29, 2000
- Running time: 112 minutes
- Country: United States
- Language: English
- Budget: $14 million
- Box office: $3.2 million

Beautiful is a 2000 American comedy drama film directed by Sally Field (in her feature film directorial debut), starring Minnie Driver and Hallie Eisenberg. The plot deals with the sacrifices that contestants in the Miss America pageant typically must make. The film had its world premiere at the Toronto International Film Festival and was released theatrically on September 29, 2000. It received negative reviews and was a commercial disappointment.

== Plot ==
Mona Hibbard is a young woman from a troubled home who has one overarching goal: to become the winner of the Miss American Miss pageant. Her mother is an alcoholic who graduates from berating her young daughter for not doing well in kids' pageants to declaring she will not provide any money or support for Mona if she keeps competing. Mona becomes best friends with Ruby Stilwell, and Ruby's kind grandmother joins her sweet granddaughter to support Mona as she begins her steady rise through the beauty pageant ranks.

Mona becomes pregnant, but, as women with children are ineligible for the MAM crown, Ruby selflessly agrees to raise Mona's daughter Vanessa as her own daughter. Mona becomes colder and meaner as she gets closer to achieving her goal, whether she's sabotaging fellow contestant Joyce Perkins on her routine and earning a lifelong enemy of an aspiring newscaster, or pawning all of her inconveniences onto Ruby while ignoring how obvious it is that Vanessa looks exactly like her. When Mona wins the Illinois pageant and goes to tell her mom about it, she fends off the mom's gross, leering husband and is left hurt when she's told that it would take too much effort to attend the MAM pageant, at which point Vanessa defends Mona and Mona is bitterly relieved to be ejected from the unloving home she grew up in.

When Ruby is falsely accused of euthanasia and jailed, Mona is forced to care for Vanessa, a task at which she is neither qualified nor appreciative, as she is afraid that her MAM crown bid will be taken away. Vanessa reacts to the situation by being angry and difficult to handle, making it clear she knows Mona is her mother and leaving Mona sad and angry with herself for not being able to just be honest. Mona heads to the MAM showcase, where one of the other contestants is nice to her and another cattily asks Mona for extra tickets for her large and loving family (Mona smiles and says "No"), while Joyce has the lead on breaking the story about Vanessa's parentage. She only later matures after seeking guidance from jailed Ruby, when Ruby refuses to fill her usual supportive role and bluntly tell Mona she needs to take care of her responsibilities in general and her daughter most of all. Mona comes to see that the pursuit of pageant fame is empty next to taking care of her family, and when she makes the MAM Final 3 she announces that she will be a role model to one little girl instead of a hero to countless strangers, confirming that she is Vanessa's mom and is withdrawing from the pageant. The judges see that the crowd is 100% in her favor, and change their rules so Mona becomes the new Miss American Miss. Joyce is left humiliated as her anti-Mona efforts, and chance to become a star TV personality, are both in ruins. Mona and Vanessa end the film having re-united with a fully exonerated Ruby and heading off to happier times.

== Cast ==
- Minnie Driver as Mona Hibbard/Miss Illinois
  - Colleen Rennison as Mona, age 12
- Joey Lauren Adams as Ruby Stilwell
  - Jacqueline Steiger as Ruby, age 12
- Hallie Eisenberg as Vanessa
- Kathleen Turner as Verna Chickle
- Leslie Stefanson as Joyce Parkins
- Bridgette Wilson (Miss Teen USA 1990) as Miss Texas/Lorna Larkin
- Kathleen Robertson as Miss Tennessee/Wanda Love
- Michael McKean as Lance DeSalvo
- Gary Collins as Miss American Miss Pageant Host
- Linda Hart as Nedra Hibbard
- Chuti Tiu (Miss Illinois 1994, America's Junior Miss 1987) as Miss Hawaii
- Ali Landry (Miss USA 1996) as outgoing titleholder Belindy Lindbrook
- Jessica Collins (Miss New York Teen USA 1988) as Miss Lawrenceville, first runner-up at Miss Illinois
- Julie Condra as Miss Iowa
- Herta Ware as Clara
- Landry Allbright as Summer

== Production ==
Field, who had previously directed the TV movie The Christmas Tree and an episode of the miniseries From the Earth to the Moon, received the script for Beautiful from Minnie Driver’s production company, Two Drivers Productions. Field was drawn to the project because of its message, saying, "To me the movie speaks about letting go of the darkness of your childhood. It’s about letting go of whatever garment you put on as a child in order to survive childhood, and taking that off and learning how to be a productive adult."

Of the female protagonist not being a likable character, Field said, "Too many women characters in movies today are saintly. They aren’t allowed to have colors like ambition, drive, passion and desire. I like seeing a character who is flawed, and who makes mistakes. Mona isn’t nice. She walks a fine line between being liked and hated. She doesn’t ask the audience to like her very often. In fact, she never asks for that. I hope by the end, you come away wanting her to survive. You might not love her or want to be her best friend, but I think you care about her and identify with her struggle."

== Release ==
=== Box office ===
Beautiful opened in the United States on September 29, 2000 in 646 venues. It ranked number 10 at the North American box office, earning $1,409,433 in its opening weekend. Overall, the film grossed $3,157,348 in the United States and $3,169,930 worldwide.

=== Critical reception ===
Beautiful received generally negative reviews from critics. On Rotten Tomatoes, it holds a 17% "Rotten" rating based on 65 reviews. The website’s critics consensus reads: "Sally Field's directing debut suffers from an inconsistent tone, implausible script, and a protagonist that critics say is one of the most loathsome to come around in a long time." On Metacritic, the film has a 23% rating based on 28 critics, indicating "generally unfavorable" reviews.

In his review for the Chicago Sun-Times, Roger Ebert gave the film one star out of four and wrote: "Beautiful should have gone through lots and lots more rewrites before it was imposed on audiences. It's a movie with so many inconsistencies, improbabilities, unanswered questions and unfinished characters that we have to suspend not only disbelief but also intelligence." In addition, Ebert felt that Minnie Driver was miscast as Mona because she "doesn't come across like the kind of person who could take beauty pageants seriously."
