= Streets of Gold (film) =

1986 film by Joe Roth

- Theatrical release poster
- Directed by: Joe Roth
- Written by: Dezsö Magyar; Heywood Gould; Richard Price; Tom Cole
- Produced by: Joe Roth; Harry J. Ufland
- Starring: Klaus Maria Brandauer; Adrian Pasdar; Wesley Snipes; Ángela Molina
- Cinematography: Arthur Albert
- Edited by: Richard Chew
- Music by: Jack Nitzsche
- Production company: Roundhouse
- Distributed by: 20th Century Fox (United States); Vestron Pictures (International)
- Release date: November 14, 1986
- Running time: 95 minutes
- Country: United States
- Language: English
- Box office: $2,546,238 (US)

Streets of Gold is a 1986 American drama film directed by Joe Roth, starring Klaus Maria Brandauer, Wesley Snipes and Adrian Pasdar.

== Plot ==
Alek is an immigrant from the Soviet Union who was not allowed on the Soviet national team because he is Jewish. One day, he meets two young amateur boxers named Roland Jenkins and Timmi Boyle and begins to coach them.

== Cast ==
- Klaus Maria Brandauer as Alek Neuman
- Adrian Pasdar as Timmy Boyle
- Wesley Snipes as Roland Jenkins
- Ángela Molina as Elena
- Elya Baskin as Klebanov
- Daniel O'Shea as Vinnie
- John Mahoney as Linnehan

== See also ==
- List of boxing films
