= Sayyed Bozorg Mahmoody =

Iranian anesthesiologist and hostage-taker

- سيد بزرگ محمودى
- Mahmoody in 2009
- Born: 1938 or 1939; Shushtar, Imperial State of Iran
- Died: 23 August 2009 (aged 70); Tehran, Iran
- Occupation: Anesthesiologist
- Spouse: Betty Lover (m. 1977; div. 1989)
- Children: Mahtob

External videos
- Sayyed Bozorg Mahmoody news interview

Sayyed Bozorg "Moody" Mahmoody (Persian: سيد بزرگ محمودى; c. 1939 – 23 August 2009) was an Iranian kidnapper, professor, engineer, and anesthesiologist, best-known for kidnapping his American then-wife Betty and their daughter Mahtob to his native country Iran and keeping them hostage there for a period of 18 months during the mid-1980s.

== Early life ==
Mahmoody was born to a prominent family in Shushtar. Mahmoody's father, a doctor, died when Mahmoody was a toddler, and he had few memories of him. His mother, also a doctor, died when he was eight years old, and he was raised by his older sister.

Mahmoody left Iran at the age of 18 to study English in London. He moved to the United States in 1961, where he became a university mathematics professor and an engineer. He worked for NASA during the 1960s, then went to medical school and became an anesthesiologist.

== Marriage and fatherhood ==
Mahmoody met Betty in 1974. They dated for three years and Betty referred to him by the nickname, "Moody". After officially becoming a licensed anesthesiologist based in the U.S., Mahmoody married Betty in Houston in 1977. Mahmoody claimed Betty proposed to him, converted to Islam and took a lively interest in Persian culture. They resided in Texas. "He was so affectionate and considerate. He would send me flowers, books, music boxes, with beautiful inscriptions."

Their daughter, Mahtob, which means 'moonlight' in Persian, was born in 1979. Mahmoody named her that after he looked at a full moon. The Mahmoodys later moved to Michigan.

== Abduction of daughter and wife ==
With assistance from one of his nephews, Mahmoody was able to convince his wife that their daughter deserved a visit "on holiday" for two weeks in Iran. They left on 4 August 1984. However, after two weeks, Mahmoody then told them they would not be returning to the United States. When she protested, Mahmoody struck Betty. It was the first time Mahtob had seen her father hit her mother.

After Mahmoody broke the news to Betty, she got extremely sick with dysentery. Mahtob sat at her side day after day, watching her fade in and out of consciousness. Betty asked Mahtob to make sure Moody did not give her a shot. Mahtob sat there to make sure her mother was safe.

Betty once quoted her husband in her 1987 book, Not Without My Daughter, telling her, "If you try to leave this house again, I will kill you!"

After 18 months, Betty and Mahtob eventually escaped in a five-hundred-mile (800 km) journey over the snowy Zagros Mountains into Turkey with help from many Iranians.

== Life after estrangement ==
After returning home, Betty filed for divorce. According to Betty Mahmoody, "The night before September 11, 2001, I was informed that [Moody] had a green card and was not only back in the U.S., but he was just a few blocks away from my house in Michigan. After he was eventually placed on a terrorist list, he was never allowed back to the U.S."

A 2002 documentary was made by Alexis Kouros and Kari Tervo titled Without My Daughter. The documentary depicted Moody defending his actions and telling the story through his perspective. It also depicted his attempts to contact Mahtob. Mahmoody also authored a book called Lost Without My Daughter (1987) in which he counterattacks Betty's claims against him.

== Media portrayal ==
Moody was portrayed by English-American actor Alfred Molina in the 1991 film, Not Without My Daughter, adapted from Betty's book of the same name. Reacting to the film and Molina's portrayal of him, Moody said, "I asked, is this supposed to be me? As you can see, I am short, bald on top, and I wear glasses: no resemblance at all, which tells a great deal about how realistic the whole movie is." Molina was once assaulted by a man who apparently hated his brutal portrayal of Moody in the film.

== Death ==
Mahmoody died in Tehran on 23 August 2009, at age 70. The cause of death was given as renal disease.
