= Neda Maghbouleh =

American sociologist, writer

- Born: New York City, U.S.
- Occupations: Sociologist, scholar, author, writer, educator
- Known for: Ethnic, racial, and cultural study of Middle Eastern and North African people

Academic background
- Education: Smith College; University of California, Santa Barbara

Academic work
- Institutions: University of British Columbia
- Website: www.nedamaghbouleh.com

Neda Maghbouleh is an American sociologist, scholar, writer, author, and educator. She is the Canada Research Chair in Race, Ethnicity, Migration and Identity and an associate professor of Sociology at the University of British Columbia.

== Biography ==
Neda Maghbouleh was born in New York City, and raised in Portland, Oregon. She attended Smith College (B.A. 2004); University of California, Santa Barbara (M.A. 2008 and PhD 2012). She moved to Canada with her family in 2013 for work.

Her book The Limits of Whiteness: Iranian Americans and the Everyday Politics of Race (2017; Stanford University Press) looked at historical and legal evidence, as well as the sociological structures of how Iranian Americans have moved between the categorization of white and "not white" in race. It is about the people of all MENA communities, but it specifically centers around Iranians. The Limits of Whiteness also discusses the "Aryan narrative" used to describe Iranians by both the people in Iran and by the diaspora, and the formation of biases. When the book was first published many older Iranian Americans did not understand or agree with the book, but after Executive Order 13769 (also known more commonly as "Trump travel ban") in early 2017 many felt a more complicated relationship to race due to new legal challenges and restrictions.

She has been recognized as an authority on the racialization of migrants from the Middle Eastern and North African (MENA) region, and has written for CBC Radio, Newsweek, NPR's Code Switch, Salon.com, Vice, and Vox Media. In 2021–2022, she was honored as a Wall Scholar by the Peter Wall Institute for Advanced Studies.

== Publications ==
- Maghbouleh, Neda (2010). "'Inherited Nostalgia' Among Second-Generation Iranian Americans: A Case Study at a Southern California University". Journal of Intercultural Studies. 31 (2): 199–218. doi:10.1080/07256861003606382. S2CID 144921510.
- Maghbouleh, Neda (2017). The Limits of Whiteness: Iranian Americans and the Everyday Politics of Race. Stanford University Press. ISBN 978-1503603370.

== See also ==
- Anti-Iranian sentiment
- Definitions of whiteness in the United States
