= The Christmas Tree (1996 film) =

1996 film directed by Sally Field

- Genre: Adventure; Drama; Family
- Based on: The Christmas Tree by Julie Salamon and Jill Weber
- Written by: Janet Brownell; Sally Field
- Directed by: Sally Field
- Starring: Julie Harris; Andrew McCarthy; Trini Alvarado; Jessica Hecht; Sally Field
- Music by: David Benoit
- Country of origin: United States
- Original language: English

Production
- Executive producers: Sally Field; Wendy Japhet
- Producers: Steven McGlothen; Janet Brownell; Shivam Sekariapuram
- Production location: Pittsburgh
- Cinematography: Kees Van Oostrum
- Editor: Harry Hitner
- Running time: 93 minutes
- Production companies: Walt Disney Television; Fogwood Films

Original release
- Network: ABC
- Release: December 22, 1996

The Christmas Tree is a 1996 American made-for-television Christmas drama film directed by Sally Field, starring Julie Harris and Andrew McCarthy and produced by Walt Disney Television which premiered on ABC on December 22, 1996.

== Plot ==
A story about a forming friendship between an elderly nun, Sister Anthony (Julie Harris), and New York's Rockefeller Center's head gardener Richard Reilly (Andrew McCarthy), who wants to fell a tree which she has been growing for decades and move it to New York City for Christmas display.

== Cast ==
- Julie Harris as Sister Anthony
- Andrew McCarthy as Richard Reilly
- Trini Alvarado as Beth
- Betty Aberlin as Sister Sarah
- Jessica Hecht as Sister Mary
- Anne Pitoniak as Mother Superior Frances
- Colin Quinn as Tom
- Sally Field as Claire
- Suzi Hofrichter as Anna
- Imogene Bliss as Sister Lucia
- Therese Courtney as Mother Superior (1939)
- Lulee Fisher as Sister Rose
- Shannon Holt as Sister Lucia (1939 / 1959)
- Lynne Innerst as Sister Frances
- Chad Luberger as Roy
- Kathleen McEntee as Sister Margaret
- Zachary Mott as Anna's Father
- Beverly Owings as Matron of the Orphanage
- Jaime Shapiro as Doreen
- Daniel Sweazen as Helicopter Pilot
- Katherine Sweeney as Terry
- Cornell J. Wallace as Harvey / Workman
- Dave Whalen as Sven
- Nili Bassman as Anna (age 18)

== Release ==
The Christmas Tree had international release under several titles: In France as Arbre de Noël, L' Canada, In Spain as Árbol de Navidad, El Spain, in Brazil as A Árvore de Natal Brazil (Portuguese), in Greece as Dentro ton Hristougennon, To Greece, and in Germany as Der Weihnachtsbaum. It was made available in October 2001 on VHS in Spanish and English.

== See also ==
- List of Christmas films
