= Alexis Kouros =

Iranian-Finnish writer and filmmaker

Alexis Kouros (born 1961, in Kermanshah, Iran) is an Iranian-Finnish writer, documentary-maker, director, and producer. Kouros is of Iranian Kurdish heritage.

His first book, Gondwana's Children, won the Finlandia Junior Award in 1997. His first film was the 2000 documentary, Waiting for Godot at De Gaulle, the story of Mehran Karimi Nasseri.

He also directed a documentary called Without My Daughter in response to the 1991 Hollywood movie, Not Without My Daughter. He started his production company Dream Catcher. The company began publishing Finland's first English language monthly called SixDegrees in 2003. Helsinki Times, a weekly English newspaper, was established by Dream Catcher in April 2007.

== Helsinki Times and SixDegrees ==
Kouros went on to become the editor-in-chief for the Helsinki Times. A paper version of Helsinki Times was published in tabloid format and was eventually discontinued in February 2015, but continued in web format.

SixDegrees continued to be published daily online, as well as monthly in print, until 2016, when the print edition was discontinued. SixDegrees published its last article online in 2024.

The Helsinki Times website continues to publish online. The website has republished articles from the People's Daily, the official newspaper of the Central Committee of the Chinese Communist Party. In 2020, the Helsinki Times published an article from the People's Daily which included a conspiracy theory about the origins of COVID-19. The Helsinki Times said the "barter-exchange" arrangement with the People's Daily was an attempt to balance western media coverage which it said was "at times extremely one-sided and biased".

In March 2025, Kouros announced that the Helsinki Times had been acquired by an unspecified "international media company."

== Works ==
=== Books ===
- Alexis, Kouros (1997). Gondwanan lapset (Finnish ed.). Lasten Keskus. p. 120. ISBN 978-9-516-27157-9.
- Harmattan, the Traveler and the Dream Catcher

=== Films ===
- Waiting for Godot at De Gaulle, 2000
- Without my Daughter, 2003
- Rubina doesn't live here anymore.., 2002
- Chosen, 2003
- Rooted
- Kokonainen, 2005

=== TV series ===
- Finnish Cinema
- Great Finns: Lönnrot
