= Hello, My Name Is Doris =

2015 film by Michael Showalter

- Theatrical release poster
- Directed by: Michael Showalter
- Screenplay by: Laura Terruso; Michael Showalter
- Based on: A short film by Laura Terruso
- Produced by: Daniela Taplin Lundberg; Riva Marker; Daniel Crown; Jordana Mollick; Kevin Mann
- Starring: Sally Field; Max Greenfield; Beth Behrs; Wendi McLendon-Covey; Stephen Root; Elizabeth Reaser; Natasha Lyonne; Tyne Daly
- Cinematography: Brian Burgoyne
- Edited by: Robert Nassau
- Music by: Brian H. Kim
- Production companies: Stage 6 Films; Red Crown Productions; Haven Entertainment
- Distributed by: Roadside Attractions (United States); Sony Pictures Releasing International (International)
- Release dates: March 14, 2015 (SXSW); March 11, 2016 (United States)
- Running time: 90 minutes
- Country: United States
- Language: English
- Budget: $1 million
- Box office: $14.7 million

Hello, My Name Is Doris is a 2015 American coming-of-age romantic comedy film directed by Michael Showalter from a screenplay by Laura Terruso and Showalter, about a woman in her 60s who tries to act on her attraction to a younger co-worker. It stars Sally Field in the title role, alongside Max Greenfield, Beth Behrs, Wendi McLendon-Covey, Stephen Root, Elizabeth Reaser, Natasha Lyonne and Tyne Daly.

The film had its world premiere at the SXSW Film Festival on March 14, 2015, and was theatrically released on March 11, 2016, by Roadside Attractions.

== Plot ==
Doris Miller is a shy, eccentric, 60-something woman, living alone following the death of her mother, with whom she had lived her whole life. At the funeral, her brother Todd and his wife Cynthia try to persuade her to sell the house, and especially get rid of the excessive possessions hoarded there over decades.

Doris had been caring for her mother for years, thereby neglecting her own social life and development. In her 20s she had been engaged but lost her fiancé when he moved away for work. As a result, Doris is relatively reclusive and unfamiliar with social trends. She spends time with her close friend, the fiery Roz, and Roz's teenage granddaughter, Vivian.

On Doris's way to work in Manhattan, where she has been doing data entry for decades, she meets her new young co-worker John, with whom she is immediately infatuated. Empowered by self-improvement tapes, Doris decides to pursue a romantic relationship with him.

Doris finds ways to get John's attention; the attempts are frequently combined with fantasies about a passionate love affair between them. With Vivian's help, she creates a fake social media profile in order to find information about John and discovers that he loves an electro-pop band that is planning an upcoming concert in the area. Doris buys one of the band's CDs, which gets John's attention, and attends the concert, where she meets him and they spend time together.

The band is intrigued by Doris and invite her backstage, where they spend a fun evening meeting young artists in the area. John tells her his girlfriend recently broke up with him over text and asks her about her love life. She reveals that she was engaged in the past, but had to end it to take care of her mother. John gives her a friendly kiss goodnight, cementing Doris' unrequited love.

John is distracted for the next week, and Doris discovers that he has a girlfriend, Brooklyn. Though she is friendly and welcoming, Doris is devastated after stalking them and seeing them kiss. She spends the night drinking wine, then impulsively posts a comment on John's social media wall through her fake profile, posing as a scorned young woman with whom he had a torrid love affair.

The next morning, Todd arrives with Doris' therapist, planning on decluttering her house. However, when Cynthia tries to throw out a pencil Doris stole from John, Doris angrily throws them out.

At work, Brooklyn arrives and has a fight with John before breaking up with him. She later tells Doris that she had seen the comment on his wall and accused him of cheating, as she was cheated on in the past. After work, John tells Doris about the incident and invites her to his Thanksgiving for friends. She agrees, and when he asks her if she would ever be interested in dating a younger man, she is elated.

Doris dresses up for the Thanksgiving party where John introduces her to his uncle, who is clearly interested. During the party, she asks to talk to John in his bedroom. Trying to come onto him, Doris admits she has always liked him and that the comment causing Brooklyn to break up with him was hers.

Furious, John rebuffs her. When a flustered Doris asks him what he meant by asking her if she was interested in younger men, John clarifies that he was trying to set her up with his uncle, who is a few years younger than her. Deeply hurt, Doris leaves and invites Roz over for comfort.

Doris invites her therapist over again to declutter her house, and she succeeds in getting it cleaned up. She quits her job and says good-bye to John before she leaves. Doris has another fantasy where he kisses her and proposes they be together; in reality, she enters the elevator to leave, alone. After hesitating, John calls out her name and runs toward the elevator. Doris smiles as the doors close.

== Cast ==
- Sally Field as Doris Miller
- Max Greenfield as John Fremont
- Beth Behrs as Brooklyn Henderson
- Tyne Daly as Roz
- Stephen Root as Todd Miller
- Wendi McLendon-Covey as Cynthia Miller
- Elizabeth Reaser as Dr. Edwards
- Isabella Acres as Vivian
- Peter Gallagher as Willy Williams
- Natasha Lyonne as Sally
- Kumail Nanjiani as Nasir
- Rich Sommer as Robert
- Caroline Aaron as Val
- Rebecca Wisocky as Anne Patterson
- Jack Antonoff as Baby Goya
- Kyle Mooney as Niles
- Nnamdi Asomugha as Shaka
- Roz Ryan as Nurse Patty
- Anna Akana as Blog Girl
- Amy Okuda as Des
- Don Stark as Uncle Frank

== Production ==
On April 18, 2014, Max Greenfield was cast in the male lead role. On May 28, 2014, it was announced that Sally Field would play the title character, and on the same day Beth Behrs was also cast. On June 27, 2014, Natasha Lyonne, Wendi McLendon-Covey, Kyle Mooney, and Kumail Nanjiani were announced as part of the cast. On July 11, 2014, YouTube star Anna Akana was cast as a web blogger whose attention is piqued by Field's character.

== Release ==
The film had its world premiere on March 14, 2015, at South by Southwest. Shortly after, it was announced Roadside Attractions had acquired U.S. distribution rights to the film, beating out companies including The Orchard, Starz, and IFC Films, while Sony Pictures Worldwide Acquisitions would be handling its international release. It was later revealed that Sony would also be co-partnering on the domestic release through Stage 6 Films. The film also screened at the Montclair Film Festival on May 1, 2015. The film was theatrically released on March 11, 2016, in a limited release, before opening in a wide release on April 1, 2016.

== Reception ==
Hello, My Name Is Doris received generally positive reviews from film critics. It holds an 86% rating on the review aggregator website Rotten Tomatoes, based on 127 reviews, with an average rating of 6.90/10. The critical consensus reads, "Hello, My Name Is Doris is immeasurably elevated by Sally Field's remarkable performance in the title role, which overpowers a surfeit of stereotypical indie quirk." On Metacritic, the film holds a rating of 63 out of 100, based on 25 critics.

Joe Leydon of Variety gave the film a positive review, writing "Sally Field keeps the movie on an even keel, for the most part, with an adroit and disciplined lead performance that generates both laughter and sympathy, with relatively few yanks on the heartstrings. Audiences of a certain age might respond warmly, provided they are stoked by savvy marketing and favorable word of mouth." Eric Kohn of Indiewire.com also gave the film a positive review, a B+, writing "Hello, My Name is Doris effectively conveys the cruel ambivalence of an ageist society, and despite its formulaic ingredients, the movie responds to that setback with Field's exuberant, virtuoso turn providing the ultimate critical response."

=== Accolades ===
Award	Date of ceremony	Category	Recipient(s)	Result	Ref(s)
AARP Annual Movies for Grownups Awards	February 6, 2017	Best Actress	Sally Field	Nominated	
AARP Annual Movies for Grownups Awards	February 6, 2017	Best Comedy	Hello, My Name Is Doris	Nominated	
Alliance of Women Film Journalists	December 21, 2016	Best Woman Screenwriter	Laura Terruso	Nominated	
Alliance of Women Film Journalists	December 21, 2016	Actress Defying Age and Ageism	Sally Field	Nominated	
Critics' Choice Awards	December 11, 2016	Best Actress in a Comedy	Sally Field	Nominated	
SXSW Film Festival	March 21, 2015	Audience Award – Headliner	Hello, My Name Is Doris	Won	
Women Film Critics Circle	December 19, 2016	Best Comedic Actress	Sally Field	Nominated	
