= Critics' Choice Movie Award for Best Actress in a Comedy =

Award given by the Broadcast Film Critics Association

- Awarded for: Best Performance by an Actress in a Leading Role in a Comedy
- Location: Los Angeles, California
- Presented by: Broadcast Film Critics Association
- First award: Jennifer Lawrence for Silver Linings Playbook (2012)
- Final award: Olivia Colman for The Favourite (2018)
- Website: www.criticschoice.com

The Critics' Choice Movie Award for Best Actress in a Comedy was one of the awards given to people working in the motion picture industry by the Broadcast Film Critics Association at their annual Critics' Choice Movie Awards.

== Winners and nominees ==
=== 2010s ===
Year	Actor	Character	Film
2012	Jennifer Lawrence	Tiffany Maxwell	Silver Linings Playbook
2012	Mila Kunis	Lori Collins	Ted
2012	Shirley MacLaine	Marjorie "Marge" Nugent	Bernie
2012	Leslie Mann	Debbie	This Is 40
2012	Rebel Wilson	Fat Amy	Pitch Perfect
2013	Amy Adams	Sydney Prosser / Lady Edith Greensly	American Hustle
2013	Sandra Bullock	Special Agent Sarah Ashburn	The Heat
2013	Melissa McCarthy	Detective Shannon Mullins	The Heat
2013	Greta Gerwig	Frances Halladay	Frances Ha
2013	Julia Louis-Dreyfus	Eva Henderson	Enough Said
2014	Jenny Slate	Donna Stern	Obvious Child
2014	Rose Byrne	Kelly Radner	Neighbors
2014	Rosario Dawson	Chelsea Brown	Top Five
2014	Melissa McCarthy	Maggie Bronstein	St. Vincent
2014	Kristen Wiig	Maggie Dean	The Skeleton Twins
2015	Amy Schumer	Amy Townsend	Trainwreck
2015	Tina Fey	Katie Ellis	Sisters
2015	Jennifer Lawrence	Joy Mangano	Joy
2015	Melissa McCarthy	Susan Cooper	Spy
2015	Lily Tomlin	Elle Reid	Grandma
2016	Meryl Streep	Florence Foster Jenkins	Florence Foster Jenkins
2016	Kate Beckinsale	Lady Susan Vernon	Love & Friendship
2016	Sally Field	Doris Miller	Hello, My Name Is Doris
2016	Kate McKinnon	Dr. Jillian Holtzmann	Ghostbusters
2016	Hailee Steinfeld	Nadine Franklin	The Edge of Seventeen
2017	Margot Robbie	Tonya Harding	I, Tonya
2017	Tiffany Haddish	Dina	Girls Trip
2017	Zoe Kazan	Emily Gardner	The Big Sick
2017	Saoirse Ronan	Christine "Lady Bird" McPherson	Lady Bird
2017	Emma Stone	Billie Jean King	Battle of the Sexes
2018	Olivia Colman	Queen Anne	The Favourite
2018	Emily Blunt	Mary Poppins	Mary Poppins Returns
2018	Elsie Fisher	Kayla Day	Eighth Grade
2018	Rachel McAdams	Annie Davis	Game Night
2018	Charlize Theron	Marlo Moreau	Tully
2018	Constance Wu	Rachel Chu	Crazy Rich Asians

== Multiple nominees ==
2 nominations

- Jennifer Lawrence

3 nominations

- Melissa McCarthy
