= Sally Field =

American actress (born 1946)

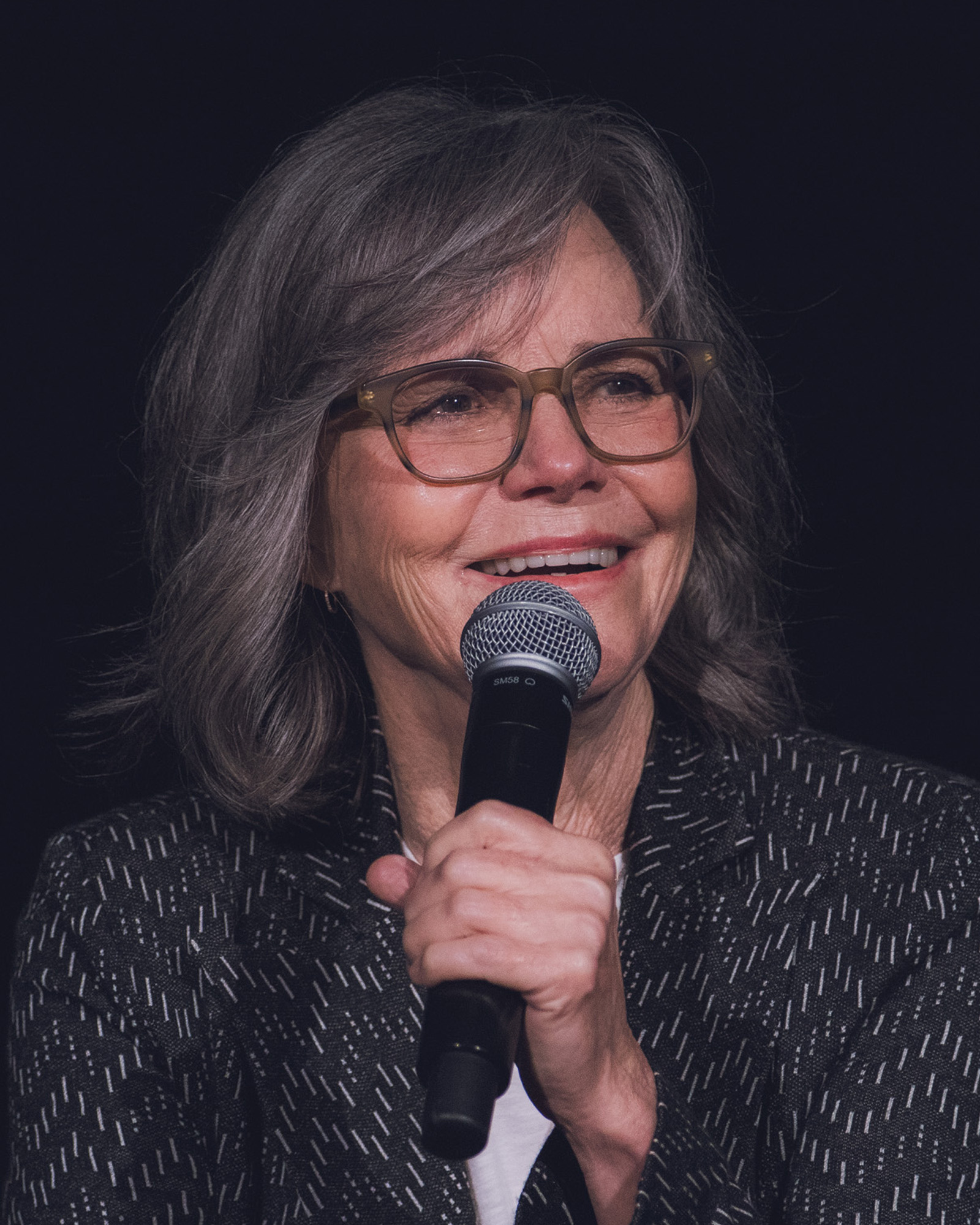
- Field in 2025
- Born: Sally Margaret Field; November 6, 1946 (age 80); Pasadena, California, U.S.
- Occupation: Actress
- Years active: 1962–present
- Works: Full list
- Spouses: Steven Craig (m. 1968; div. 1975); Alan Greisman (m. 1984; div. 1994)
- Partner: Burt Reynolds (1976–1982)
- Children: 3, including Peter Craig and Eli Craig
- Mother: Margaret Field
- Relatives: Richard D. Field (brother)
- Awards: Full list

Sally Margaret Field (born November 6, 1946) is an American actress. Known for her roles on screen and stage, she has received various accolades including two Academy Awards, two Golden Globe Awards, and four Primetime Emmy Awards, as well as nominations for two British Academy Film Awards and a Tony Award. She was honored with a star on the Hollywood Walk of Fame in 2014, the National Medal of Arts in 2014, the Kennedy Center Honor in 2019, and the Screen Actors Guild Life Achievement Award in 2023.

She earned two Academy Awards for Best Actress for her portrayals as a union organizer in Norma Rae (1979) and a mother struggling during the Great Depression in Places in the Heart (1984). She was Oscar nominated for playing Mary Todd Lincoln in Lincoln (2012). She also starred in Smokey and the Bandit (1977), Smokey and the Bandit II (1980), Absence of Malice (1981), Murphy's Romance (1985), Steel Magnolias (1989), Mrs. Doubtfire (1993), and Forrest Gump (1994). She played Aunt May in The Amazing Spider-Man (2012) and its 2014 sequel.

On television, she gained stardom for her television roles in the ABC sitcoms Gidget (1965–1966) and The Flying Nun (1967–1970). She won four Primetime Emmy Awards for her performances in the NBC film Sybil (1976), the NBC medical drama ER (2001), the ABC drama series Brothers & Sisters (2006–2011), and the Netflix film Remarkably Bright Creatures (2026). On stage, she starred in the Broadway revival of the Tennessee Williams play The Glass Menagerie for which she received a nomination for the Tony Award for Best Actress in a Play.

== Early life and education ==
Sally Margaret Field was born on November 6, 1946, in Pasadena, California, a suburb of Los Angeles. Her mother, Margaret Field (1922–2011), was an actress. Her father, Richard Dryden Field (1914–1993), was a pharmacist who served in the Army during World War II. Her ancestry includes English and Irish. Her brother is Richard Dryden Field Jr., a physicist and academic. Her parents were divorced in 1950; on January 21, 1952, in Tijuana, Mexico, her mother married Jock Mahoney, an actor and stuntman. Field said in her 2018 memoir that she was sexually abused by Mahoney throughout her childhood, up to the age of 14.

As a teen, Field attended Portola Middle School and Birmingham High School in Van Nuys, where she was a cheerleader. Her class of 1964 classmates included financier Michael Milken and talent agent Michael Ovitz, while actress Cindy Williams was a year behind Field.

Field has stated that when she was seventeen she got an illegal abortion in Mexico, and was molested by a technician during the procedure.

== Career ==
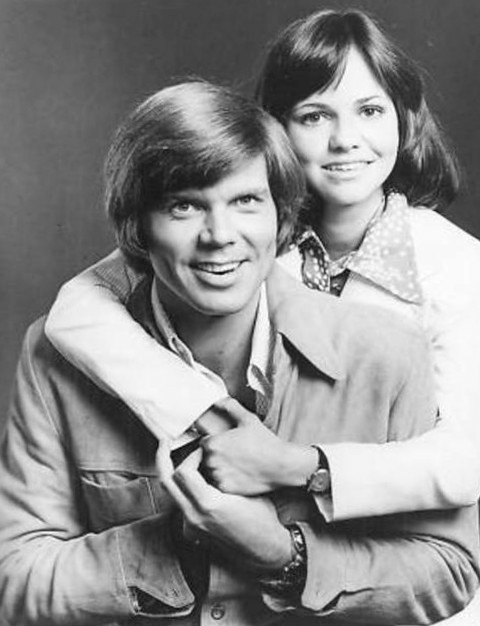
Field and John Davidson on NBC's The Girl with Something Extra (1973)

=== 1965–1976: Early television roles and Gidget ===
Field got her start on television as the boy-crazy surfer girl in the sitcom Gidget (ABC, 1965–1966). The show was not an initial success and was cancelled after a single season; however, summer reruns garnered respectable ratings, making the show a belated success. Wanting to find a new starring vehicle for Field, ABC next produced The Flying Nun with Field cast as Sister Bertrille for three seasons, from 1967 to 1970. In an interview included on the Season One DVD release, Field said that she thoroughly enjoyed Gidget but hated The Flying Nun because she was not treated with respect by the show's directors. During her time on The Flying Nun, Field had a brief singing career, recording an album (Star of The Flying Nun, 1967) and a number of singles.

Field was then typecast, finding respectable roles difficult to obtain. In 1971, Field starred in the ABC television film Maybe I'll Come Home in the Spring, playing a discouraged teen runaway who returns home with a bearded, drug-abusing hippie (played by David Carradine). She made several guest television appearances through the mid-1970s, including a role on the Western Alias Smith and Jones, a popular series starring Gidget co-star Pete Duel. She also appeared in the episode "Whisper" on the thriller Night Gallery.

In 1973, Field was cast in a starring role opposite John Davidson in the series The Girl with Something Extra that aired from 1973 to 1974. Following the series' cancellation, Field studied at the Actors Studio with acting teacher Lee Strasberg. Strasberg became a mentor to Field, helping her move past her television image of the girl next door. During this period, Field divorced her first husband in 1975.

Soon after studying with Strasberg, Field landed the title role in the 1976 television film Sybil, based on the book by Flora Rheta Schreiber. Her dramatic portrayal of a young woman afflicted with dissociative identity disorder earned her an Emmy Award for Outstanding Lead Actress in a Special Program – Drama or Comedy in 1977 and enabled her to break through the typecasting of her sitcom work. She received further strong reviews for her work in the 1976 film Stay Hungry, opposite Jeff Bridges and Arnold Schwarzenegger.

=== 1977–1989: Norma Rae and film stardom ===
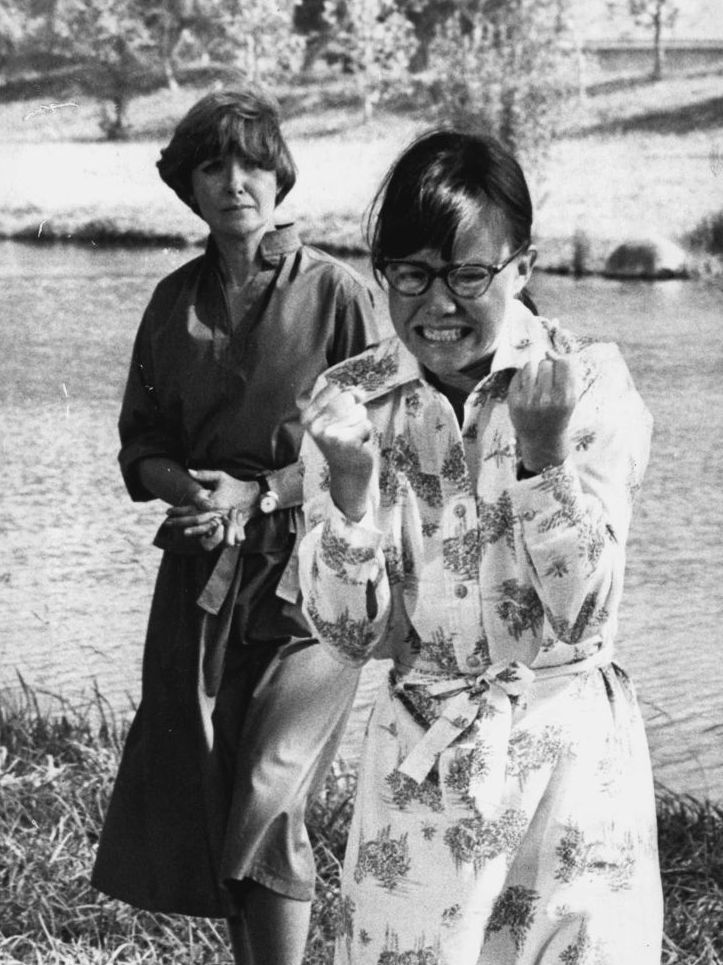
Field with Joanne Woodward in Sybil (1976)

In 1977, Field co-starred with Burt Reynolds, Jackie Gleason, and Jerry Reed in the year's second-highest-grossing film, Smokey and the Bandit. In 1979, she played the titular union organizer in Norma Rae, a film that established her as a dramatic actress. Vincent Canby, reviewing the film for The New York Times, wrote: "Norma Rae is a seriously concerned contemporary drama, illuminated by some very good performances and one, Miss Field's, that is spectacular." For her role in Norma Rae, Field won the Best Female Performance Prize at the Cannes Film Festival and the Academy Award for Best Actress.

Field appeared with Reynolds in three more films: The End, Hooper, and Smokey and the Bandit II. In 1981, she continued to change her image, playing a foul-mouthed prostitute opposite Tommy Lee Jones in the South-set film Back Roads. She was nominated for a Golden Globe for the 1981 drama Absence of Malice and the 1982 comedy Kiss Me Goodbye.

In the 1984 drama Places in the Heart, she starred as Edna Spalding, a farm widow struggling to weather the Great Depression. She won her second Golden Globe Award and second Oscar. Field's acceptance speech has since been both admired as earnest and parodied as excessive, mainly the line, "And I can't deny the fact that you like me...right now...you like me! (applause) Thank you!" Field later parodied herself when she delivered the line (often misquoted as "You like me, you really like me!") in a Charles Schwab commercial.

In 1985, she co-starred with James Garner in the romantic comedy Murphy's Romance. The following year, Field appeared on the cover of the March 1986 issue of Playboy magazine, in which she was the interview subject. She did not appear as a pictorial subject in the magazine, although she did wear the classic leotard and bunny-ears outfit on the cover. That year, she received the Women in Film Crystal Award. For her role as matriarch M'Lynn in the film version of Steel Magnolias (1989), she was nominated for a 1990 Golden Globe Award for Best Actress.

=== 1990–2009: Established actress ===
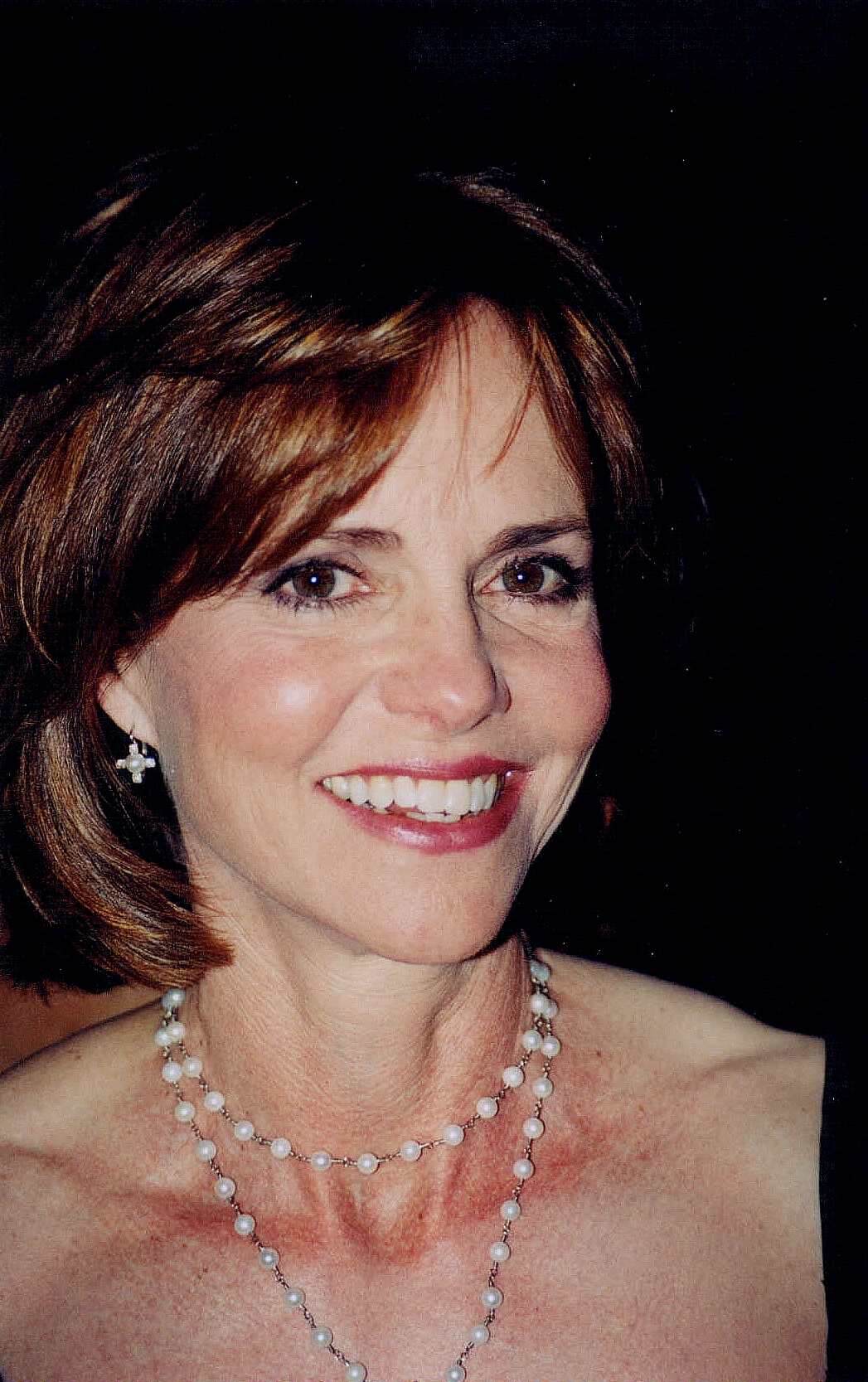
Field in Washington, D.C. in 2002

In the early 1990s, Field had supporting roles in a number of films. These included Disney's live-action film Homeward Bound: The Incredible Journey (1993), where she voiced the role of Sassy. In Mrs. Doubtfire (1993), she played the wife of Robin Williams's character and the love interest of Pierce Brosnan's character. She then played Tom Hanks's mother in Forrest Gump (1994), even though she was only 10 years older than Hanks, with whom she had co-starred six years earlier in Punchline. For Forrest Gump, she received BAFTA and SAG nominations. Field's other 1990s films included Not Without My Daughter, a controversial thriller based on the real-life experience of Betty Mahmoody's escape from Iran with her daughter Mahtob; and Soapdish, a comedy in which she played a pampered soap-opera star and was joined by a cast that included Kevin Kline, Whoopi Goldberg, Cathy Moriarty, Elisabeth Shue, and Robert Downey Jr. In 1996, Field reprised her role as Sassy in Homeward Bound 2: Lost in San Francisco and later that year, she received the Berlinale Camera award at the 46th Berlin International Film Festival for her role as a grieving vigilante mother in director John Schlesinger's film Eye for an Eye. In 1997, Field guest starred on the King of the Hill episode "Hilloween", in which she voiced religious woman Junie Harper, who contends with Hank Hill (Mike Judge) to ban Halloween. She co-starred with Natalie Portman in Where the Heart Is (2000), and appeared opposite Reese Witherspoon in Legally Blonde 2: Red, White & Blonde.

Field had a recurring role on ER in the 2000–2001 season as Dr. Abby Lockhart's mother, Maggie, who has bipolar disorder, a role for which she won an Emmy Award in 2001. After her critically acclaimed stint on the show, she returned to the role in 2003 and 2006. She also starred in the 2002 series The Court. Field's directorial career began with the television film The Christmas Tree (1996). In 1998, she directed the episode "The Original Wives' Club" of the critically acclaimed TV miniseries From the Earth to the Moon, also playing a minor role as Trudy, the wife of astronaut Gordon Cooper. In 2000, she directed the feature film Beautiful.

Field was a late addition to the ABC drama Brothers & Sisters, which debuted in September 2006. In the show's pilot, the role of matriarch Nora Walker was played by Betty Buckley. However, the show's producers decided to take the character in another direction, and offered the part to Field, who won the 2007 Emmy Award for Outstanding Lead Actress in a Drama Series for her performance. The drama also starred Calista Flockhart and Rachel Griffiths as Nora's adult daughters. In November 2009, Field appeared on an episode of The Doctors to talk about osteoporosis and her Rally With Sally Foundation.

=== 2010–present: Broadway debut and streaming roles ===
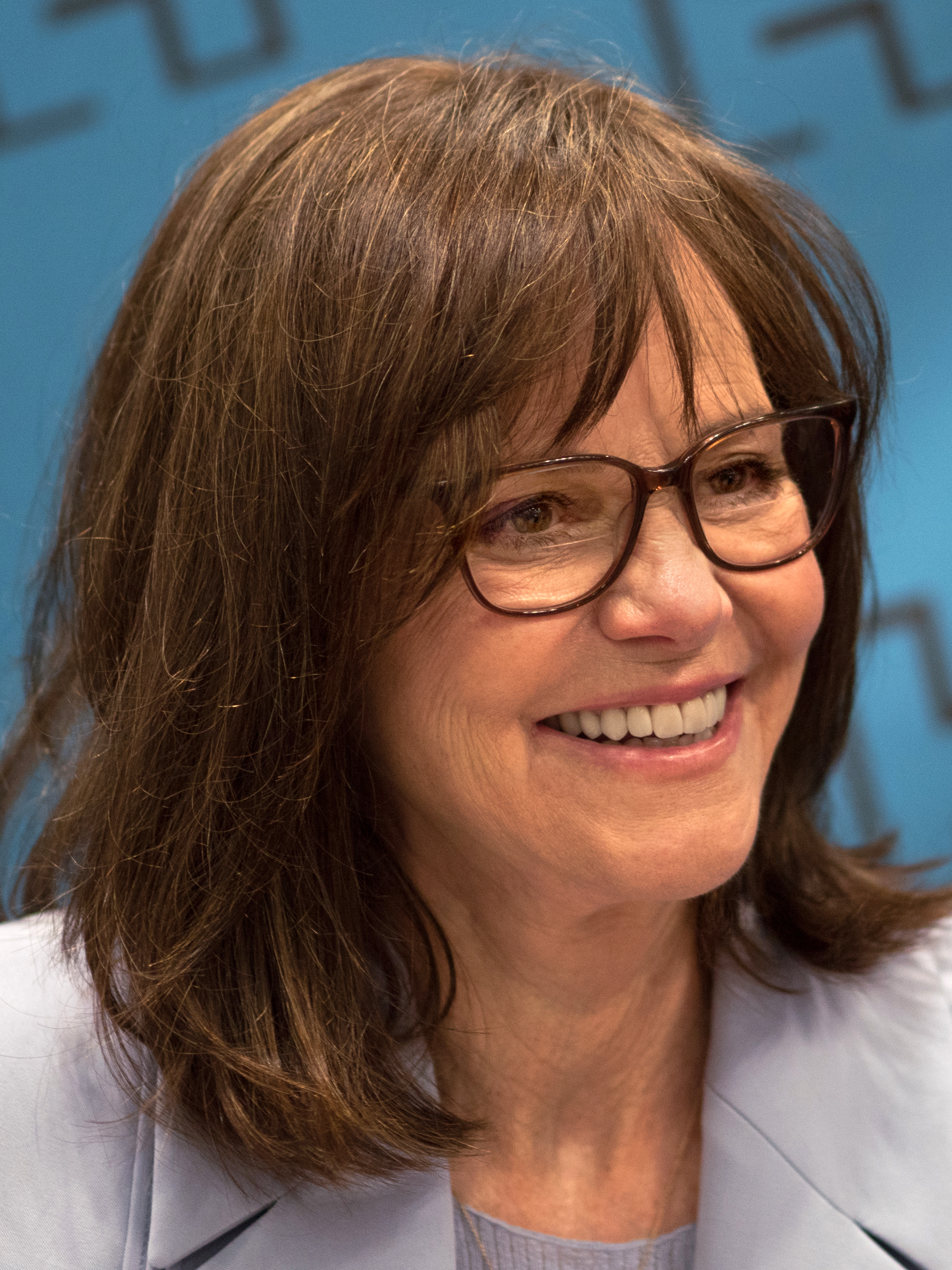
Field in 2018

She portrayed Aunt May in the Marvel Comics films The Amazing Spider-Man (2012) as well as the 2014 sequel. Field's widely praised portrayal of Mary Todd Lincoln in Steven Spielberg's film Lincoln, also in 2012, brought her Best Supporting Actress Award nominations at the Oscars, Golden Globes, BAFTA, Screen Actors Guild, and Critics' Choice.

On May 5, 2014, Field received a star on the Hollywood Walk of Fame for her contributions to motion pictures. Her star is located in front of the Hollywood Wax Museum. In January 2015, it was announced that she would co-host TCM. The same year, Field portrayed the titular character in Hello, My Name Is Doris, for which she was nominated for the Critics' Choice Movie Award for Best Actress in a Comedy. In 2017, Field reprised her role as Amanda Wingfield in The Glass Menagerie on Broadway at the Belasco Theatre. Performances began on February 7, 2017, in previews, and officially opened on March 9. The production closed on May 21, 2017, after 85 performance and 31 previews. Field had previously played the role in the Kennedy Center production in 2004. She was nominated for a Tony Award for Best Actress in a Play for her performance. Her memoir, In Pieces, was published by Grand Central Publishing in September 2018.

Field returned to episodic television in 2018, starring in the Netflix miniseries Maniac. Subsequently, in 2020, Field starred in the AMC series Dispatches from Elsewhere.

In 2023, Field co-starred in the comedy movie 80 for Brady, which starred NFL quarterback Tom Brady along with fellow actresses Jane Fonda, Lily Tomlin and Rita Moreno. Also in 2023, Field was named the 58th recipient of the Screen Actors Guild Life Achievement Award, which she was presented at the 29th Screen Actors Guild Awards. In May 2026, she starred in the Netflix film Remarkably Bright Creatures, opposite Lewis Pullman, for which later that year at age 79 she became the oldest person to win a Primetime Emmy Award for Outstanding Lead Actress in a Limited or Anthology Series or Movie.

== Personal life ==
=== Marriages and family ===
Field was married to Steven Craig from 1968 to 1975, though they separated in 1973. The couple had two sons: Peter Craig and Eli Craig.

In 1976, Field began a relationship with Burt Reynolds, while filming the movie Smokey and the Bandit. They appeared in three more films, Smokey and the Bandit II, The End and Hooper, before their breakup in 1980; they continued to date sporadically until splitting permanently in 1982.

Field married her second husband, Alan Greisman, in 1984. Together, they had one son, Sam Greisman, in 1987. They divorced in 1994.

On October 29, 1988, at Aspen/Pitkin County Airport in Colorado, Field and three members of her family were in a private plane owned by media mogul Merv Griffin when it lost power and rejected takeoff, crashing into a parked aircraft. They all survived with minor injuries.

=== Memoir ===
In her 2018 memoir, In Pieces, Field wrote that she suffered from "severe depression" in her late teens. She stated that taking acting classes had helped her overcome "this urgency, this anxiety, this need to find something that was festering in me."

=== Philanthropy and activism ===
Field has been a strong advocate for women's rights, and having undergone a traumatic illegal abortion in Mexico at the age of seventeen, she is a vocal advocate for abortion rights in the United States. She has served on the board of directors of Vital Voices Global Partnership, an international women's NGO, and has co-hosted the Global Leadership Awards six times.

Field is also an advocate for LGBT rights, and was honored with the Human Rights Campaign's Ally for Equality Award in 2012. Her youngest son, Samuel Greisman, is gay.

In 2005, Field was diagnosed with osteoporosis. Her diagnosis led her to create the "Rally with Sally for Bone Health" campaign with support from Roche and GlaxoSmithKline that controversially co-promoted Boniva, a bisphosphonate treatment for osteoporosis. Field's campaign encouraged the early diagnosis of such conditions through technology such as bone-density scans.

In 2005, Field received the Golden Plate Award of the American Academy of Achievement presented in recognition of her lifetime of contributions to the arts as well as her dedication as a social activist.

During her acceptance speech at the 2007 Emmy Awards, when she won for Outstanding Lead Actress in a Drama Series, Field said: "If the mothers ruled the world, there would be no goddamn wars in the first place." Fox Broadcasting Company, which aired the show, cut the sound and picture after the word "god" and did not return camera/sound to the stage until after Field finished talking. An e-mail statement from the company the day after the incident explained that the censorship of Field's speech (among two other censorship incidents during the award ceremony) occurred because "some language during the live broadcast may have been considered inappropriate by some viewers. As a result, Fox's broadcast standards executives determined it appropriate to drop sound and picture during those portions of the show."

On December 13, 2019, Field was arrested along with other protesters who were taking part in one of Jane Fonda's Fire Drill Fridays climate change demonstrations in Washington, D.C.

A Democrat, Field supported Hillary Clinton's bid for the Democratic Party's nomination in the 2008 presidential election, and Kamala Harris’s 2024 presidential campaign.

== Acting credits and accolades ==
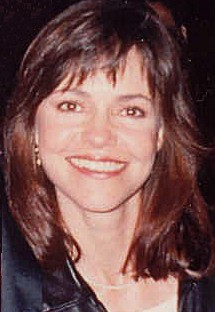
Field at the 62nd Academy Awards in 1990

Field has been recognized by the Academy of Motion Picture Arts and Sciences for the following:

- 52nd Academy Awards: Best Actress, win, for Norma Rae (1979)
- 57th Academy Awards: Best Actress, win, for Places in the Heart (1984)
- 85th Academy Awards: Best Supporting Actress, nomination, for Lincoln (2012)

In addition, she has been nominated for two BAFTA Awards, ten Primetime Emmy Awards (winning four), eleven Golden Globe Awards (winning two), nine competitive Actor Awards (winning one) along with an honorary Life Achievement Award, one Tony Award, one Cannes Film Festival Award for Best Actress (winning one), and two Critics' Choice Movie Awards.

== Discography ==
Singles

- "Felicidad" (Billboard No. 94, Cashbox No. 91) / "Find Yourself a Rainbow" – Colgems 1008 – August 1967
- "Follow the Star" (Both sides, promo only) – Colgems 107 – December 1967
- "Golden Days" / "You're a Grand Old Flag" – Colgems 1014 – January 1968
- "Gonna Build a Mountain" / "Months of the Year" (also features Flying Nun co-stars Madeleine Sherwood and Marge Redmond) – Colgems 1030 – September 1968

Album

- Star of The Flying Nun—Colgems COM-106 (Mono) / COS-106 (Stereo) – Billboard 200 No. 172, December 1967
