= Not Without My Daughter (film) =

1991 film by Brian Gilbert

- Theatrical release poster
- Directed by: Brian Gilbert
- Screenplay by: David W. Rintels
- Based on: Not Without My Daughter by Betty Mahmoody and William Hoffer
- Produced by: Harry J. Ufland; Mary Jane Ufland
- Starring: Sally Field; Alfred Molina; Sheila Rosenthal; Roshan Seth
- Cinematography: Peter Hannan
- Edited by: Terry Rawlings
- Music by: Jerry Goldsmith
- Production companies: Pathe Entertainment; Ufland Productions
- Distributed by: Metro-Goldwyn-Mayer
- Release date: January 11, 1991
- Running time: 116 minutes
- Country: United States
- Languages: English; Persian
- Budget: $13.2 million
- Box office: $43 million

Not Without My Daughter is a 1991 American drama film based on the 1987 book of the same name. It depicts the escape of American citizen Betty Mahmoody and her daughter, Mahtob, from her abusive ex-husband Sayyed "Moody" Bozorg Mahmoody in Iran. Filming was done in 1990 in the United States and Israel, and the main characters Betty and Moody are played by Sally Field and Alfred Molina, respectively. Sheila Rosenthal and Roshan Seth co-star as Mahtob and Houssein the smuggler, respectively.

== Plot ==
In 1984, Iranian physician Sayyed Bozorg "Moody" Mahmoody lives a quiet, happy life in Michigan with his American wife, Betty, and their young daughter, Mahtob. Moody tells Betty his family wants to meet her and Mahtob and asks them to accompany him for a two-week visit to Iran. Despite her deep fears, Betty reluctantly agrees after Moody promises on the Quran that they will safely return to America.

Upon their arrival, Moody and Mahtob are embraced, while Betty's unfamiliarity with the Islamic lifestyle offends Moody's family. One evening, Moody reveals he had been fired from the hospital two days prior to their departure. Betty promises they will rectify the situation when they get home.

The night before their return flight, Moody's brother Mammal tells them that their passports should have been taken to the airport for approval three days ago. Moody reveals he never intended for them to return, and that they will live in Iran where he will work as a doctor. When Betty protests, Moody becomes enraged and strikes her. Betty tries to earn sympathy from Moody's family, but is scorned by them. The Iran–Iraq War continues, and Moody becomes more hostile and abusive towards Betty, preventing her from leaving the house or using the telephone, claiming his family supervise her.

One day, Betty's mother calls Betty and directs her to the American Interests Section of the Swiss Embassy. There, she reaches to Swiss diplomat, Nicole Ajamian, and learns that under Iranian nationality law, she obtained Iranian citizenship upon her marriage to Moody and thus is not entitled to consular protection. Because Iran is an Islamic republic governed by sharia law, Betty cannot leave the country or make decisions concerning Mahtob without Moody's permission. Moody discovers Betty's absence from the house and threatens to kill her if she tries anything again.

Betty reluctantly conforms to Moody's wishes for his trust, and they move into Mammal's home. At the market, Betty meets Hamid, a kind, sympathetic storekeeper who allows her to use his telephone and overhears her plea for help. He puts her in contact with humanitarian Iranians Houssein and his sister Nassimi, who offer to help Betty and Mahtob return home. Betty accepts Houssein's assistance after he warns her that Mahtob becomes eligible for marriage or conscription at 9 years old.

Betty accompanies Mahtob to her new Iranian school. Betty meets with Houssein and they discuss an escape route. One morning, she and Mahtob arrive at school, finding Moody waiting for them; he viciously attacks Betty and strikes Mahtob. They return home with Moody, who separates them to taunt Betty, but later returns following another missile attack.

Six months later, Betty learns that her father is seriously ill. Moody agrees to let her see him in America, yet without Mahtob. He orders her to liquidate their assets while there. Betty and Mahtob sneak out of the house while Moody is called to the hospital. Houssein supplies Betty and Mahtob with fake identity documents, and they make their way past checkpoints across the Persian Gulf.

Betty and Mahtob find themselves in Ankara, where they see the flag of the American Embassy in the distance. They return safely to the United States, where Betty divorces Moody, then goes on to become a successful author and dedicate herself to helping those in similar situations.

== Cast ==
- Sally Field as Betty Mahmoody
- Alfred Molina as Sayyed Bozorg "Moody" Mahmoody
- Sheila Rosenthal as Mahtob Mahmoody
- Roshan Seth as Houssein
- Sarah Badel as Nicole Ajamian
- Mony Rey as Ameh Bozorg
- Georges Corraface as Mohsen
- Mary Nell Santacroce as Mrs. Lover
- Ed Grady as Mr. Lover
- Jonathan Cherchi as Mammal Mahmoody
- Avraham Mor as Hormoz
- Sasson Gabai as Hamid
- Ahuva Keren as Nassimi
- Farzaneh Taidi as Khanun Shaheen
- Yosef Shiloach as Companion

== Production ==
The movie was based on a book with the same title written by Betty Mahmoody and William Hoffer and based on Mahmoody's version of events. The screenplay was written by David W. Rintels. The film was directed by Brian Gilbert and filmed in Israel, at GG Studios in Neve Ilan, Ajami, Allenby Street in Tel Aviv, the Negev desert, Acre, Eilat, and Atlanta from February to May 1990. Producers Harry J. Ufland and Mary Jane Ufland said they used "Islamic experts" for the Islamic themes present in the script. Russian extras were cast as Iranian citizens in various crowd scenes. The film's budget was reportedly $15 million USD.

== Release and reception ==
Upon its release on January 11, 1991, Not Without My Daughter opened with $4 million at the box office. Despite a high-profile lead performance by Sally Field, then coming off the success of Steel Magnolias, the film failed to make a significant cultural or commercial impact initially and was often dismissed as resembling a television melodrama.

However, the film has retained a curious afterlife, often re-aired on television, occasionally shown in educational settings and notably broadcast in Paris the night before the 1998 USA vs. Iran World Cup match, which drew criticism from Iranian communities. According to Iranian-American author Reza Aslan, the film became an “albatross” for many Iranians in the U.S., reinforcing stereotypes of abusive Iranian men and oppressive Islamic society. Jack Shaheen cited the movie in his book about negative depictions of Arabs, Persians and Muslims in American movies.

=== Box office ===
The movie debuted poorly and grossed less than $15 million in ticket sales in the United States and Canada. The movie plummeted in its second week. Internationally, it grossed $28 million for a worldwide total of $43 million.

=== Critical response ===
As of June 2026, the film holds an approval rating of 50% rating on Rotten Tomatoes, based on 16 reviews.

Roger Ebert of the Chicago Sun-Times wrote: "Here is a perplexing and frustrating film, which works with great skill to involve our emotions, while at the same time making moral and racial assertions that are deeply troubling." He stated that it "does not play fair with its Muslim characters. If a movie of such a vitriolic and spiteful nature were to be made in America about any other ethnic group, it would be denounced as racist and prejudiced. ...Yet I recommend that the film be seen, for two reasons. One reason is because of the undeniable dramatic strength of its structure and performances; it is impossible not to identify with this mother and her daughter, and Field is very effective as a brave, resourceful woman who is determined to free herself and her daughter from involuntary captivity. The second reason is harder to explain. I think the movie should be seen because it is an invitation to thought."

While Iranians are not shown in a completely negative light, as the film depicts generous and brave Iranians who contact Betty Mahmoody and arrange for the escape of her and her daughter, these "good" Iranians are high-born opponents of the Islamic Republic regime, shown listening to European classical music. In 2016, Gazelle Emami of Vulture, reflecting on the 25 years since the film's release, concluded that Not Without My Daughter had become known for making American women more apprehensive towards dating or marrying Iranian men.

The score by Jerry Goldsmith was also not well received. Jay Boyar of the Orlando Sentinel called it "TV-movie manipulative", while Jason Ankeny of AllMusic wrote, "Jerry Goldsmith's score does little to refute its opponents' charges of racism."

== Awards and nominations ==
Sheila Rosenthal won the Young Artist Award for Best Supporting Actress in a Motion Picture at the 13th Youth in Film Awards. Sally Field was nominated for the Golden Raspberry Award for Worst Actress, where she lost to Sean Young for A Kiss Before Dying at the 12th Golden Raspberry Awards.

== Aftermath ==
Alfred Molina confirmed in an interview with Time Out that he was punched by a man who apparently hated his brutal portrayal of Dr. Sayyed Bozorg Mahmoody in the film.

This film inspired the 1998 Indian Telugu-language film Anthahpuram, which in turn was remade into the 2002 Bollywood film, Shakti: The Power.

The 2002 documentary Without My Daughter relates the events from Dr. Mahmoody's perspective and attempts to contradict both Betty Mahmoody’s book and the film.

In 2015, Mahtob Mahmoody released a book recalling the incidents from her perspective, My Name is Mahtob. Earlier editions included the taglines: "Not Without My Daughter continues" and "Daring escape, a life of fear, and the forgiveness that set me free". The current (2024) tagline is: "The story that began in the global phenomenon Not Without My Daughter continues."

The 1998 South Park second season episode "Terrance and Phillip in Not Without My Anus", with a similar plot, this time concerning Iraqis and Saddam Hussein (Matt Stone), spoofs the title of this movie.

== See also ==
- 1991 in film
- Iran–United States relations
- Shakti: The Power a 2002 Indian film
- Un burka por amor (A Burkah For Love), a 2009 Spanish film about a woman trapped in Afghanistan after she followed her husband to his native country.
