= Mahtob Mahmoody =

American author (born 1979)

- مهتاب محمودى
- Born: September 4, 1979 (age 46); Houston, Texas, U.S.
- Occupation: Author
- Known for: Her memoir, My Name is Mahtob
- Parent(s): Sayyed Bozorg Mahmoody (father); Betty Lover (mother)

Mahtob Maryam Mahmoody (Persian: مهتاب محمودى; born September 4, 1979) is an American author who wrote the autobiographical memoir My Name is Mahtob, which depicts her perspective of her family's story when she and her mother, Betty Mahmoody, were held captive by her father, Sayyed Bozorg Mahmoody, in his country of birth, Iran, for a period of 18 months during the mid-1980s. Her mother wrote her version of their story in her 1987 biography Not Without My Daughter, which was adapted into a 1991 feature film of the same name in which Mahtob was portrayed by Sheila Rosenthal and her parents were portrayed by Sally Field and Alfred Molina.

== Biography ==
External videos
- Swedish News Interview with Mahtob and Betty Mahmoody

Mahtob was born to parents Betty Lover and Sayyed Bozorg "Moody" Mahmoody in Houston on September 4, 1979. Her first name means "Moonlight" in Persian. It was her father who named her that after he was inspired by a full moon. Mahtob has two half brothers through Betty's first marriage, Joe and John, who are 13 and 9 years older than her respectively. Mahtob and her parents lived in Texas before moving to Michigan. She grew up in Alpena, Michigan.

On August 4, 1984, Mahtob and her parents arrived in Tehran to meet with Moody's relatives. Their stay was originally meant to have lasted only two weeks, but Mahtob and Betty were held captive by Moody for eighteen months. According to Mahtob, Betty suspected that Moody would keep them in Iran when he suggested that they visit, but she was afraid that if she said no, he would abduct Mahtob. Mahtob stated in an interview with NPR:

So it was the night before we were to leave to return to America. Mom was packing. And there had been talk about our passports and our papers weren't in order and, you know, there were issues. But everything was going to work out. It was going to be all right. And then the night before we were to leave, we were in the bedroom. Mom was packing. And my dad came in and said that's it. We weren't leaving. We were in Iran until we died. And we were in his country. We had to abide by his rules. And from then on, he was a completely different person. To me, that's when my daddy died. You know, he was, from that moment on, completely changed.

— Mahtob Mahmoody, November 29, 2015

Since Sayyed was Iranian by birth, Iranian law gave him complete custody of Mahtob. Betty was worried that Mahtob would learn anti-American sentiment at school. Mahtob also reported that her father would beat her and her mother. After eighteen months, Mahtob and her mother managed to escape Iran by crossing the mountains of Turkey. They successfully made it back to the United States. Mahtob never saw her father again, and Betty would file for divorce. Six years after Moody's death in 2009, Mahtob has confirmed that she has forgiven her father for his actions.

When Mahtob was 13, she was diagnosed with lupus. She managed to survive the disease because of experimental treatment. She resides in Grand Rapids, Michigan. Mahtob is a devout member of the Wisconsin Evangelical Lutheran Synod.

In 2015, Mahtob's memoir My Name is Mahtob was published. Though it depicts Mahtob's version of her family's story, My Name is Mahtob has been considered a sequel to her mother's book, Not Without My Daughter.
