= Betty Mahmoody =

American author and public speaker (born 1945)

- Born: Betty Lover; June 9, 1945 (age 81); Alma, Michigan, U.S.
- Occupations: Author, public speaker
- Known for: Author of Not Without My Daughter
- Spouse: Sayyed Bozorg Mahmoody (m. 1977; div. 1989)
- Children: Joseph, John, and Mahtob

Betty Mahmoody (née Lover; born June 9, 1945) is an American author and public speaker. In 1984, during a visit to Iran with her husband and daughter, he refused to let them return to the United States, holding them captive in Iran and subjecting them to constant abuse until she escaped with her daughter to Turkey in 1986. After she and her daughter returned to the US and after her divorce to Moody, she garnered media attention in 1987 when she published Not Without My Daughter, a memoir recounting her captivity in Iran. MGM-Pathé Communications adapted her memoir into a film in 1990.

Since publicizing her account, she has gone on to work as an advocate and activist for children's rights. She is the president and co-founder of One World: For Children, an organization that promotes understanding between cultures and strives to offer security and protection to children of bi-cultural marriages.

== Not Without My Daughter ==
Her book, Not Without My Daughter, is an account of her experiences in 1984–1986 when she left Alpena, Michigan to go to Iran with her husband and daughter for what she was promised would be a short visit. Once there, she and her daughter were held against their will. The book was made into a 1991 film starring Sally Field as Betty.

According to the book, she and her husband, Sayyed Bozorg “Moody” Mahmoody, and their daughter, Mahtob Mahmoody, traveled to Iran in August 1984 for what her husband said would be a two-week visit with his family in Tehran. Once the two weeks were over, however, he refused to allow his wife and child to leave. When she protested, Moody struck Betty. It was the first time Mahtob had seen her father hit her mother. After Moody broke the news to Betty, she got extremely sick with dysentery. Mahtob sat at her side day after day, watching her fade in and out of consciousness. Betty asked Mahtob to make sure Moody, a medical doctor, didn’t give her an injection as she feared it may have been lethal. Mahtob sat there and made sure her mother was safe. Betty was trapped in a nation hostile to Americans, with in-laws who were hostile to her, and an abusive husband. According to the book, her husband separated her from her daughter for weeks on end. He also assaulted her and threatened to kill her if she tried to leave.

She eventually escaped with her daughter. The book details her 500 miles (800 km) escape over the snowy Zagros Mountains into Turkey, and the help she received from many Iranians. After returning to the USA in 1986, she filed for divorce.

== Other books ==
Betty compiled stories of other parents whose foreign spouses estranged them from their children in the book For the Love of a Child (1992).

== Personal life ==
Betty is a devout member of the Wisconsin Evangelical Lutheran Synod like her daughter Mahtob. In 1992 she was inducted into Omicron Delta Kappa, the National Leadership Honor Society, by Ferris State University as an honoris causa initiate.

She has two sons from a previous marriage, Joseph and John, who are 13 and 9 years older than Mahtob, respectively.

== See also ==
- Phyllis Chesler, who was married to a Westernized Muslim man from Afghanistan
- Aurora Nilsson, was also married to another Westernized Afghan Muslim man
- Debbie Rodriguez, co-founder of The Kabul Beauty School
