= Abner, the Invisible Dog =

- Theatrical release poster
- Directed by: Fred Olen Ray
- Written by: Pat Moran
- Produced by: Fred Olen Ray; Kimberly A. Ray
- Starring: Daniel Zykov; Molly Morgen Lamont; David DeLuise; David Chokachi
- Cinematography: Theo Angell
- Edited by: Randy Carter
- Music by: Matthew Janszen
- Distributed by: Cambria Hankin
- Release date: October 30, 2013
- Country: United States
- Language: English

Abner, the Invisible Dog is a 2013 American comedy film directed by Fred Olen Ray and written by Pat Moran. It stars Daniel Zykov, Molly Morgen Lamont, David DeLuise, and David Chokachi.

== Premise ==
As Chad is celebrating his thirteenth birthday, his dog Abner starts talking and becoming invisible.

== Cast ==
- Daniel Zykov as Chad
- Molly Morgen Lamont as Sophie
- David DeLuise as Murdoch
- David Chokachi as Denning
- Ben Giroux as Kane
- Robert R. Shafer as Charlie
- Nancy Sullivan as Jackie
- Ted Monte as Ned
- Jennifer Keller as Sharon
- Jacqui Holland as Candi
- Jane Kean as Tante Ida
- Bryce Hurless as Josh
- Christopher Bones as Kevin
- Brian Nolan as The Clerk
- Marc Barnes as Hayes
- David Moretti as Ed
- Sean Christopher as Guard
- Mark Lindsay Chapman as Abner, a talking Old English Sheepdog (voice)

== Reception ==
CommonSenseMedia described the film as "Dimwitted dog tale with bumbling villains, farts, bullies."
