= Fucking Men =

2009 play by Joe DiPietro

- Promotional Poster
- Original language: English
- Written by: Joe DiPietro
- Setting: United States

Premiere
- Date: January 9, 2009
- Place: Kings Head Theatre; London

Fucking Men is a 2009 American play by Joe DiPietro. It premiered at the King's Head Theatre in the London Borough of Islington, directed by Phil Willmott. It opened on 9 January 2009 and was extended three times due to strong sales, and later ran in repertory with Naked Boys Singing. Both productions transferred to the Arts Theatre in London's West End Theatre on 15 July 2009. It was revived at the King's Head in August 2015, directed by Geoffrey Hyland. It was revived again by the King's Head in December 2015, directed by Mark Barford, designed by Jamie Simmons, lighting by Jack Weir and starring Richard De Lisle, Harper James and Haydn Whiteside. This production played again in London (April/May 2016) and then toured to Dublin (May 2016) and the Edinburgh Fringe Festival (August 2016). It played at The Vaults Waterloo until January 15, 2017. It was revived again with a new cast at Waterloo East Theatre from 2023 to 2025.

The play had its United States premiere on 11 September 2009 at the Celebration Theatre in Los Angeles, California. The production was directed and co-produced by Calvin Remsberg. This production featured Johnny Kostney, Brian Dare, Mike Ciriaco, Michael Rachlis, Sean Galuszka, David Pevsner, Jeff Olsen, A.J. Tannen, Chad Borden and Gregory Franklin.
