= David Shae =

American actor (born 1981)

- Shae in 2026
- Born: September 3, 1981 (age 45); Cranston, Rhode Island, U.S.
- Occupation: Actor
- Years active: 2004–present

David Shae (also known as David Moretti) (born September 3, 1981) is an American actor. He is best known for playing Ron Martz, in Clint Eastwood's Richard Jewell (2019) and Alfred on The Walking Dead (2019–2020).

== Early life ==
Shae was born in Cranston, Rhode Island, attended Boston College for one year, and then transferred to and graduated from the University of Southern California in 2002 with a degree in English. He was a member of the Delta Chi fraternity.

== Career ==
From 2007 to 2010, he appeared in the role of Thom in the series The Lair. He made appearances as the same character in Dante's Cove. His recent acting credits include Creepshow, The Walking Dead, and Lodge 49.

In 2011, he starred in an off-Broadway theatre production of My Big Gay Italian Wedding.

== Personal life ==
Shae is gay and first came out when one of his fraternity brothers found he had a profile on a gay dating site. He currently resides in Atlanta, Georgia.

== Filmography ==
=== Film ===
| Year | Title | Role | Notes |
|---|---|---|---|
| 2004 | In Enemy Hands | German Soldier | Uncredited (as David Moretti) |
| 2004 | Arizona | Jared | (as David Moretti) |
| 2005 | Interviewing Norman | Isaac | (as David Moretti) |
| 2007 | Manje | Ray | (as David Moretti) |
| 2008 | Murder.com | Roger | a.k.a. Murder Dot Com and A Date with Murder (as David Moretti) |
| 2008 | Playing with Fire | Director | (as David Moretti) |
| 2010 | Shut Up and Kiss Me | Roy | (as David Moretti) |
| 2011 | Finding Mr. Wright | Pearce Wright | (as David Moretti) |
| 2011 | Shattered Hopes: The True Story of the Amityville Murders - Part I: From Horror to Homicide | Bob Kelske | Documentary (as David Moretti) |
| 2012 | Shattered Hopes: The True Story of the Amityville Murders - Part II: Mob, Mayhem, Murder | Bob Kelske | Documentary (as David Moretti) |
| 2012 | Scrooge & Marley | Bob Cratchitt | (as David Moretti) |
| 2013 | Abner, the Invisible Dog | Ed | (as David Moretti) |
| 2014 | Shattered Hopes: The True Story of the Amityville Murders - Part III: Fraud & Forensics | Bob Kelske | Documentary (as David Moretti) |
| 2017 | The Plot | Will Whitford | |
| 2019 | Gemini Man | Bicycle Messenger | |
| 2019 | The Banker | Senior Counsel | |
| 2019 | Richard Jewell | Ron Martz | |
| 2019 | Line of Duty | Telescope | |
| 2020 | Bad Boys for Life | Disturbed Airline Passenger | |
| 2020 | The Glorias | Journalist | |
| 2021 | Respect | Male Reporter | |
| 2023 | They Cloned Tyrone | Chicken Manager | |
| 2023 | The Burial | David Shatterock | |
| 2023 | Dashing Through the Snow | Detective Bobby Carlotta | |

=== Television ===
| Year | Title | Role | Notes |
|---|---|---|---|
| 2007 | Dante's Cove | Tom | 2 episodes (as David Moretti) |
| 2007–2009 | The Lair | Thom Etherton / Richard DeVere | 28 episodes (as David Moretti) |
| 2012–2014 | Project: Phoenix | Agent Stefano | 6 episodes (as David Moretti) |
| 2014 | High Hopes: The Amityville Horror Murders | Bob Kelske | TV movie (as David Moretti) |
| 2016 | House of Cards | Buha | Episode: "Chapter 48" |
| 2017 | The Immortal Life of Henrietta Lacks | Reporter | TV movie |
| 2017 | Shots Fired | The Handler | 4 episodes |
| 2017 | Love at the Shore | Businessman #1 | TV movie |
| 2017 | Living the Dream | Loan Manager | Episode: "Blink Test" |
| 2018 | The Gifted | Molecule Hound | Episode: "X-roads" |
| 2018 | The Inspectors | Kit Remmington | Episode: "Blast Off" |
| 2018 | The Originals | Man | Episode: "We Have Not Long to Love" |
| 2018 | The Haunting of Hill House | Max's Father | 2 episodes |
| 2018 | Life-Size 2 | Devin Drake | TV movie |
| 2018–2019 | Lodge 49 | Tim | 3 episodes |
| 2019 | Dolly Parton's Heartstrings | Alex Sidwell | Episode: "These Old Bones" |
| 2019 | Florida Girls | Matty | 2 episodes |
| 2019 | Star | Thomas King | Episode: "The Reckoning" |
| 2019 | Creepshow | Randy | Episode: "Gray Matter/The House of the Head" |
| 2019–2020 | The Walking Dead | Alfred | 3 episodes |
| 2020 | MacGyver | Chad | Episode: "Mac + Desi + Riley + Aubrey" |
| 2020 | Young Dylan | Phillipe | Episode: "Speechless" |
| 2020 | Doom Patrol | Dex Trainor (grandson of Larry Trainor) | 2 episodes |
| 2021 | The Resident | Terry Berndahl | Episode: "The Accidental Patient" |
| 2021 | Saints & Sinners: Judgement Day | Officer Timmons | TV movie |
| 2022 | Queens | Ivan Silva | Episode: "I'm a Slave 4 U" |
| 2022 | Killing It | Roderick | 2 episodes |
| 2022 | Dynasty | Dr. Bronner | Episode: "The Only Thing That Counts Is Winning" |
| 2022 | First Kill | Detective Lee | 2 episodes |
| 2023 | Drunk, Driving, and 17 | Tim Wright | TV movie |
| 2024 | Genius | Cashier | Episode: "MLK/X: Graduation" |
| 2024 | Reasonable Doubt | Vince Larson | 2 episodes |
| 2024 | English Teacher | Chuck | Episode 8, "Birthday" |
