= Scrooge & Marley =

Scrooge and Marley is a fictional firm, owned by business partners Ebenezer Scrooge and Jacob Marley of A Christmas Carol.

Scrooge & Marley may also refer to:

Film adaptations of A Christmas Carol

- Scrooge & Marley (2001), starring Dean Jones
- Scrooge & Marley (2012 film)

In music

- "Scrooge and Marley – I Don't Want It to Be Me", a 2010 song by The Music
