= Michelle Wolff =

American actress

- Born: California, United States
- Occupation: Actress
- Website: michellewolff.com

Michelle Wolff is an American actress best known for her role as "Lou" in the 2004 comedy film Mango Kiss and for her role as Brit on the Here TV Network series Dante's Cove.

== Early life and education ==
Wolff holds a BA in theater arts with an acting emphasis from University of California, Santa Cruz.

== Career ==
Wolff has worked on many film shorts and experimental independent films. She has appeared in films that include Mango Kiss, Evolution, Unspeakable, Sol Goode, and The Ten Rules, as well as Trapped!.

Her television appearances include roles in ER, Without a Trace, Close to Home, Sleeper Cell, L.A. Dragnet, Veronica Mars, Nip/Tuck, and NCIS. She has often appeared in bit parts as a police officer or paramedic, including reappearing roles as a paramedic for nine episodes of Chicago Hope, three episodes of Providence and two episodes of Boston Public.

After appearing as Brit, the local scuba instructor and bartender in the second season of the TV series Dante's Cove, she returned as a series regular in season 3.

== Personal life ==
Wolff is openly lesbian. She is married to Linda Fusco, a West Hollywood event producer.

Wolff holds a second degree black belt and a teaching certificate in ATA Taekwondo.
