= Waterloo East Theatre =

Theatre in London, England

The Waterloo East Theatre is an independent, non-profit small venue in London, featuring a 150-seat auditorium.

== History ==
Waterloo East Theatre opened in September 2010, when actor and producer Gerald Armin decided to use one of the unused railway arches near Waterloo station as a theatre.

When the theatre first opened, Armin stated: “I aim to programme unexpected, exciting and entertaining fare. The only thing I want to be predictable about Waterloo East Theatre is the cost of tickets – always affordable – starting from £10 and we’ll have a ‘pay what you can’ night within the run of every show.”

The theatre hosts small shows of various types, from new writing to parodies, musicals, plays and comedy shows.

In September 2025, Waterloo East Theatre celebrated its 15 anniversary with a Gala Concert, welcoming familiar and new faces, all sharing memories of their time at the venue.

== Productions ==
Waterloo East Theatre has staged more than 200 productions and welcomed over 150,000 audience members through its doors.

Notable shows through its history are:

- Boris - The Musical (2017, 2018, 2021)
- Trump the Musical! (2018)
- Briefs (2019)
- Afterglow (2019, 2022)
- Leonard Bernstein’s New York (European Premiere) (2021)
- F**king Men (2023, 2024, 2025)
