= The Lair =

2007 American television series

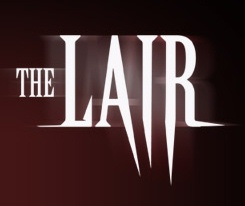
- Title card
- Genre: Horror, LGBT
- Created by: Fred Olen Ray
- Starring: Peter Stickles; David Moretti; Dylan Vox; Colton Ford; Brian Nolan; Beverly Lynne; Jesse Cutlip; Matty Ferraro; Frankie Valenti; Steven Hirschi
- Opening theme: Welcome to the Lair
- Country of origin: United States
- Original language: English
- No. of seasons: 3
- No. of episodes: 28 (list of episodes)

Production
- Running time: 27 minutes

Original release
- Network: here!
- Release: June 1, 2007 – November 27, 2009

Related
- Dante's Cove

The Lair is an American gay-themed vampire television series produced by here! in 2007. A spin-off of Dante's Cove, the first season consisted of six episodes and wrapped production in January 2007. The first two episodes premiered on June 1, 2007. Season 2 consisted of nine episodes and debuted on September 5, 2008. A third season of 13 episodes was announced in September 2008 and Colton Ford confirmed that filming took place in October and November 2008. Season 3 premiered September 4, 2009. The series is notable for casting several adult entertainment actors in their first mainstream acting roles.

In 2024, here! launched a revival of the series, titled The Lair: OnlyFangs. The season of six episodes and starring British actor Emrhys Cooper aired in 2024. A second season was planned for but never made.

== Cast ==
=== Main ===
- Peter Stickles as Damian Courtenay, leader of a vampire coven and owner of The Lair
- David Moretti as Thom Etherton, (Note: Moretti also played the character of Richard DeVere in one episode of season one.) reporter for a local newspaper
- Dylan Vox as Colin, Damian's second in command
- Brian Nolan as Frankie, The Lair's human janitor
- Colton Ford as Sheriff Trout, the island's sheriff
- Jesse Cutlip as Jonathan, (Note: Jonathan is played by Ethan Reynolds in season two as a recurring role.) Thom's overly jealous boyfriend (season 1)
- Beverly Lynne as Laura Rivers, Thom's best friend and co-worker (seasons 1–2)
- Matty Ferraro as Ian, a young werewolf (season 2)
- Frankie Valenti as Tim, a landscaper and botanist's assistant (seasons 2–3)
- Steven Hirschi as Athan, (Note: Athan's Gorgon form is played by Eberhardt Huhn.) an ancient Gorgon (season 3)

=== Also starring ===
In season three select actors had their names included in the opening credits directly after the main cast members' names, although no montage was made for them

- Thor Knai as Dennis, a troubled youth who was straightened out by Sheriff Trout
- Jared Grey as Harris Phillip Chichester, owner of the Seen Of The Crime Bookstore and author of two books on local legends
- Vince Harrington as Matty, manager of the Arkham Harbor Light bar
- Tyler Saint as an unnamed member of Damian's coven

=== Special guest stars ===
In season three select actors had their names included in the opening credits as special guest stars, although no montage was made for them

- Sybil Danning as Frau Von Hess, a vampire who wants revenge on Damian
- Ron Jeremy as a Delivery Guy, delivering to the Arkham Harbor Light bar

== Plot summary ==
=== Season 1 ===
The Lair is set in a small island community, the exact location of which is unknown. Thom, a reporter for the local paper, is investigating a string of deaths of young men, known as the "John Doe murders". His investigation leads him to a sex club called The Lair, which he discovers is run by a coven of vampires led by Damian. Damian is drawn to Thom because Thom is the double of the man who turned Damian into a vampire two centuries earlier. Colin, Damian's lieutenant, schemes to brick Damian behind a wall and take over The Lair. Local lawman Sheriff Trout, also investigating the murders, finds his way to The Lair. A shootout ensues in which Damian's human henchman Frankie is killed.

=== Season 2 ===
As Sheriff Trout recovers from his gunshot wounds, he takes in Ian, a new arrival to the island who is pursued by a mysterious mainlander. Damian contacts Thom and convinces him to recover Damian's body and restore him. Frankie haunts Colin, warning of his imminent demise. Intrigue blooms in the form of the Lumina Orchis, a flower that blossoms only in the moonlight and which casts a strange fascination over local botanist Jake to the dismay of his assistant Tim. By season's end, Jake, Laura, Jonathan and the mysterious mainlander are all dead, Colin is destroyed and Thom is living at The Lair.

=== Season 2.5 ===
Season 2.5 was depicted in an online 8-part comic series drawn by comic artist Rosendo Brown, known for Fabulance. Each part in the series was a one-page stand-alone story that was meant to fill in the missing links of events that transpired after the Season 2 finale. These stories were:

1. "A Cold Day in Hell": Colin arrives in Hell and learns that he must make a deal with the devil to return to his immortal, vampire life.
2. "Special Delivery": Damian indulges in deviant sexual behavior with one of his vampire coven as he ruminates on his life as the undead king.
3. "Bump in the Night": Sheriff Trout keeps watch on a sleepless night at his house, guarding against the unseen terrors that have suddenly plagued his town.
4. "Highway to Hell": Colin is given directions by the demon on where he can find The Master, who will return Colin to Earth.
5. "A Warm Welcome": Colin fights a demon guardian on his quest to find the elusive "Master"
6. "Ghost Stories": Frankie learns the bright side of being a ghost from the spirit of a dead little boy.
7. "Last Call": Thom starts to lament the choices in his life as he is accosted by a blood thirsty vampire in Damian's club.
8. "A Chance in Hell": The Master puts his plan into motion by agreeing to return Colin to the world of the living

=== Season 3 ===
Thom struggles to adjust to life as the only human at The Lair. Colin enthrals Richie from beyond the grave to restore Colin, who schemes to establish a club to rival The Lair. Damian is contacted by the reclusive Frau von Hess, who has plans for him and the island. Sheriff Trout, missing the now-fugitive Ian, recalls another young man from his past. A new arrival to the island is Athan, an antiquities expert who harbours within him the spirit of a male gorgon.

== Podcast ==
On June 21, 2007, here! launched a podcast for the series. Hosted by DJ and here! personality Ben Harvey, the podcast features roundtable discussions of the series and interviews with cast members. No new podcasts associated with season two have been released; the last podcast was released in October 2007.

== Critical response ==
Critical reaction to The Lair has been largely negative. "Awful...in a general sense [but with] true camp value" is how the Pittsburgh Post-Gazette described the show. While the Post-Gazette singles out Moretti's performance for praise, other reviews describe various of the cast as "wooden" and the acting "so amateurishly done as to be comical at times."

== DVD releases ==
DVD name	Episodes	Release date	Special features
The Lair: The Complete First Season	6	October 9, 2007 (Region 1); February 2, 2009 (Region 2)	Blooper reel; Backlot featurette; Photo gallery
The Lair: Season 2	9	February 24, 2009 (Region 1); August 3, 2009 (Region 2)	
The Lair: The Complete Third Season	13	March 10, 2010 (Region 1)	

== The Lair: OnlyFangs ==
On January 12, 2024, HereTV revealed it had revived the series with The Lair: OnlyFangs.

Set decades after the events of the original 2007 series, the revival moved the setting to Los Angeles and introduced a clan of werewolves as the primary antagonists. Although billed as a continuation of the original series, the intro credits of every episode explained that the original Lair and its vampires were destroyed in the war between vampires and werewolves. The series retained the franchise's emphasis on erotic horror and relationship-driven storytelling, and was released as a short-form production aimed at streaming audiences.

== See also ==
- Vampire film
- List of vampire television series
