= Unspeakable (2002 film) =

- Directed by: Thomas J. Wright
- Produced by: John Duffy; Lee Friedlander; Nimmi Grover; Pavan Grover
- Starring: Pavan Grover; Marco Rodríguez; Dina Meyer; Lance Henriksen
- Cinematography: Antonio Calvache
- Edited by: PG; Jason R. Stone; Bob Willems
- Music by: Jeff Marsh
- Release date: 2002
- Running time: 79 minutes
- Country: United States
- Language: English

Unspeakable is a horror film directed by Thomas J. Wright. It was written by physician Pavan Grover who also stars in it. Produced in 2002, it was released in 2003.

Among the other performers who appear in the film are Dina Meyer (one of the main characters), Dennis Hopper, Jeff Fahey, Lance Henriksen, and Michelle Wolff.

== Plot ==
A scientist (Meyer) uses technology to peer into the minds of death row inmates. After selecting one sociopath, a serial killer (Grover), she learns of his extrasensory abilities and much more.

== Cast ==
- Dina Meyer as Diana Purlow
- Pavan Grover as Jesse Mowatt
- Lance Henriksen as Jack Pitchford
- Dennis Hopper as Warden Earl Blakely
- Marco Rodríguez as Cesar Canales
- Jeff Fahey as The Governor
- Jonathan Levit as Kenny
- Michelle Wolff as Jan Littlefield
- Miguel Pérez as Guard Lazarow
- Irene DeBari as Mowatt's Mother

== Reception ==
The film has received especially negative reviews from the few professional movie critics who were willing to view and critique it. No critics reviews are listed on Rotten Tomatoes, and viewers rate it an average of 2.7 of 5 stars.
