= The Collingswood Story =

- Original DVD cover artwork
- Directed by: Michael Costanza
- Written by: Michael Costanza
- Produced by: Beverly Burton
- Starring: Stephanie Dees; Johnny Burton; Diane Behrens; Grant Edmonds
- Music by: John DeBorde
- Production company: Cinerebel Films
- Distributed by: Cinerebel Media LLC
- Release dates: October 29, 2002; August 28, 2005 (FrightFest)
- Running time: 82 minutes
- Country: United States
- Language: English

The Collingswood Story is a 2002 American computer screen supernatural horror film written and directed by Michael Costanza, and starring Stephanie Dees, Johnny Burton, Grant Edmonds, and Diane Behrens. Its plot follows a college-aged couple who attempt to maintain their long-distance relationship via video chatting; however, a chance encounter with an online psychic plunges their lives into a world of nightmarish supernatural phenomena.

The Collingswood Story began production in the year 2000, when video chatting was in its infancy and far from mainstream. It is known today as the first screenlife film for its innovative video chat concept. In an August 2022 editorial "The Evolution of Found Footage: A History of Screenlife Horror" The Collingswood Story is referred to as "the first true Screenlife horror flick." The film has been cited as a precursor to a number of horror films presented in the computer screen format, such as Host and Unfriended.

== Plot ==
Rebecca Miles relocates to Collingswood, New Jersey to attend Rutgers University, renting a room in a historic house. On Rebecca's twenty-first birthday, her boyfriend, Johnny, gifts her a webcam so the two can maintain a long-distance relationship. Johnny, communicating with his friend Billy—also via webcam—is introduced to Vera Madeline, an online psychic whom Billy claims contacted his deceased father. Rebecca is skeptical of Vera and offers to have a virtual session with her first. During the video conference, Vera appears in a darkened room, backlit by two candelabras and donning sunglasses. Rebecca gives Vera a false name but shortly into her psychic reading, Vera calls Rebecca by her actual name. This piques Rebecca's interest but she chalks it up to Vera having some method of caller identification.

When Johnny has a session with Vera, she asks who referred him and he mentions Rebecca. Vera comments that Collingswood is well-known to psychics and mediums due to grim historical events that occurred there involving a secret society founded by a French immigrant named Alan Tashi, who in the 1800s, murdered and mutilated nine girls. He cut out their eyes and slit their mouths into grotesque smiles before disposing of their bodies in a well nearby. When the townspeople attempted to seek vengeance, they stormed Tashi's home but found it empty. In the attic, they discovered a wooden shaker toy but no sign of Tashi. Vera urges Johnny to have Rebecca contact her again for another session, suggesting that Rebecca is a "sensitive" and that she has important information for her.

Upon further investigation, Johnny discovers that the house Rebecca is living in was the site of a murder–suicide four years prior, in which a judge drowned his children in the bathtub before killing his wife and then, himself. In crime scene photos published online, Johnny glimpses a wooden shaker toy. Armed with this knowledge, Johnny worries about Rebecca, who has been left alone in the house by the homeowners over the Halloween weekend. Rebecca begins to look for evidence of the supposed secret society in Collingswood. She records footage as she drives around town but is unable to locate the address of the original Tashi home.

On Saturday, which is Halloween, Rebecca again connects with Vera for a video conference. Rebecca inquires about the secret society Vera had told Johnny about; however, Vera denies having any knowledge of the matter and acts as though she has never spoken to Rebecca. Furthermore, she claims her psychic readings are for entertainment purposes only. Rebecca video calls Johnny to tell him about her call with Vera. While perusing the bookshelf in the den of the home, Rebecca finds postcards depicting a wooden shaker toy resembling the one left behind in Alan Tashi's absence, as shown in the crime scene photos. Rebecca recalls that Vera spoke in French during one of their sessions and she begins to suspect that Vera might be a member of the secret society.

Johnny manages to contact Vera again, who tells him to get Rebecca out of the house and alludes to the fact that the secret society practiced rituals in the attic of the house. Meanwhile, Rebecca goes for a drive to get food. On the way home, she again attempts to locate the Tashi residence and manages to find it. When she returns home, Johnny tells her what Vera told him. A defiant Rebecca decides to explore the attic. Recording her endeavor with the webcam as Johnny watches she finds a secret room, where she locates a number of old photographs and occult paraphernalia. Her webcam stream is interrupted by a video call from Vera, who warns her to leave. Vera removes her sunglasses, revealing one glass eye—she explains that she narrowly escaped the cult, who cut out one of her eyes.

Vera's call suddenly ends and Rebecca reconnects with Johnny. He watches as she attempts to flee the attic in a panic but is confronted by Alan Tashi. Simultaneously, an unknown figure emerges from the closed door behind Johnny and attacks him. The movie ends with an unknown figure taking the webcam to the wooden shaker toy, a shot of Rebecca smiling in the dark and a dead Johnny with his eyes cut out and a glasgow smile across his face.

== Cast ==
- Stephanie Dees as Rebecca Miles
- Johnny Burton as Johnny
- Diane Behrens as Vera Madeline
- Grant Edmonds as Billy
- Glenn Hoeffner as Theodore

== Production ==
Writer-director Michael Costanza developed the idea for the film based on an old news article about a mass murder that occurred in a New Jersey home in the 19th century.

Stephanie Dees, who portrays Rebecca in the film, had previously appeared in a minor part in Halloween 4: The Return of Michael Myers (1988) as a child.

Filming of The Collingswood Story took place primarily in Los Angeles, California, though some exteriors were filmed by Costanza in Collingswood, New Jersey.

== Release ==
In 2005, The Collingswood Story screened at film festivals including Frightfest in London, The Festival of Fantastic Films in Manchester, and the Fearless Tales Film Festival in San Francisco. The film received the Best Cast and Best Indie Film Award. During the film's Anchor Bay release The Collingswood Story received raves reviews. Quotes included "A Low Budget Triumph", "Inventive and Frightening", "The Tense Atmosphere is Simply Superb and Unnerving", "Original and Clever", "Unquestionably the Best "Pure" Horror Film of this Year's Frightfest". Empire, Dreamwatch, SFX, and journalist Kim Newman also praised the film.

The Collingswood Story was then pitched as a remake to various studios including the producers of Paranormal Activity.

In April 2011, Dread Central screened the film during their celebration of Indie Horror Month.

In March 2022, The Collingswood Story was featured in the Unnamed Footage Festival and screened at the Balboa Theater in San Francisco.

=== Home media ===
The Collingswood Story was initially distributed on DVD on June 21, 2006, by Anchor Bay UK.

On October 5, 2021, The Collingswood Story was released on Amazon Prime Video as well as on Blu-ray via Cauldron Films.

On October 3, 2022, The Collingswood Story began streaming uncut exclusively on AMC's Shudder.

== Awards ==
- Best Cast, Fearless Tales Film Festival San Francisco, California 2005

== See also ==
- List of films set around Halloween
