= Nadine Nicole =

American actress

- Born: Nadine Nicole Heimann; September 15, 1983 (age 42); Rochester, Michigan
- Other names: Nadine Nicole
- Occupation: Actress
- Years active: 2005–present

Nadine Nicole Heimann (born September 15, 1983), known professionally as Nadine Nicole, is an American actress.

== Personal life ==
Nicole was born in Rochester, Michigan, to a German father and a Filipina mother, and is the oldest of three children (sister Lorraine and brother Eric). She attended Fordham University in New York City for two years, then moved to Los Angeles. She is friends with The Young and the Restless co-stars Christel Khalil, Mishael Morgan and Bryton James.

== Career ==
In 2005–07, Nicole played Van, a lesbian holding the supernatural powers of the so-called Tresum, in here TV's horror series Dante's Cove. From 2018-2021, she played Clarissa Mao in The Expanse, first as a recurring character (season 3, 2018), then as a guest (season 4, 2019), then as a regular (seasons 5–6, 2020–21).

She has also had several recurring roles. In 2014–2016 she played Gwen on the CBS soap opera The Young and the Restless. In 2014 she appeared as commitment-phobic travel writer Julia in Alex Burunova's award-winning indie film Lonely Planet, shot in Barcelona. In 2017 she was in the Hulu series Casual. In 2019 she appeared in NBC's The Village.

== Charity work ==
In 2012, Nicole started the non-profit organization True Connection.

== Filmography ==
=== Film ===
Year	Title	Role	Notes
2009	So Long, Lonesome	Angie	
2011	Black Gold	Rebecca Angelides	
2011	Paradise Broken	Misha	
2012	Briefcase	Sam	Short
2014	Lonely Planet	Julia	Short

=== Television ===
Year	Title	Role	Notes
2005–2007	Dante's Cove (as Nadine Heimann)	Van	Main role (seasons 1–2)
2007	CSI: Crime Scene Investigation (as Nadine Heimann)	Jennifer 'Jenn' Smith	Episode: "Empty Eyes"
2009	The Bold and the Beautiful	Shari	Episode: "1.5561"
2009, 2011	Workshop	Rebecca	Episodes: "Somebody's Watchin' Me", "The Mormonator", "Whatever It Takes"
2010	CSI: NY	Lacey Deshane	Episode: "Uncertainty Rules"
2010	Romantically Challenged	Sarah	Episode: "The Charade"
2010	One Life to Live	Gwen Randall	Episode: "1.10776"
2011	The Protector	Selena Flores	Episode: "Safe"
2014–2016	The Young and the Restless	Gwen Randall	Recurring role
2015	CSI: Cyber	Kate	Episode: "Fire Code"
2016	Scorpion	Beth	Episode: "This Is the Pits"
2017	Casual	Casey	Recurring role (season 3)
2018	Magnum P.I.	Emily	Episode: "I Saw the Sun Rise"
2018–2022	The Expanse	Clarissa Mao	Recurring role (season 3), Guest (season 4 episode 1), Main role (seasons 5 and 6)
2019	The Village	Amy Bowman	Episodes: "In Your Bones", "Heart on Fire", "Laid Bare", "Yes or No"
2022	The Rookie: Feds	Zora	Episode: "The Reaper"
2022	Exception	Patty (voice)	
20??	Xtra Life	Diana	TV miniseries, announced
