= Dick Gallagher =

American songwriter

Dick Gallagher (October 16, 1955 – January 20, 2005) was a pianist and composer, best known on the New York City cabaret scene.

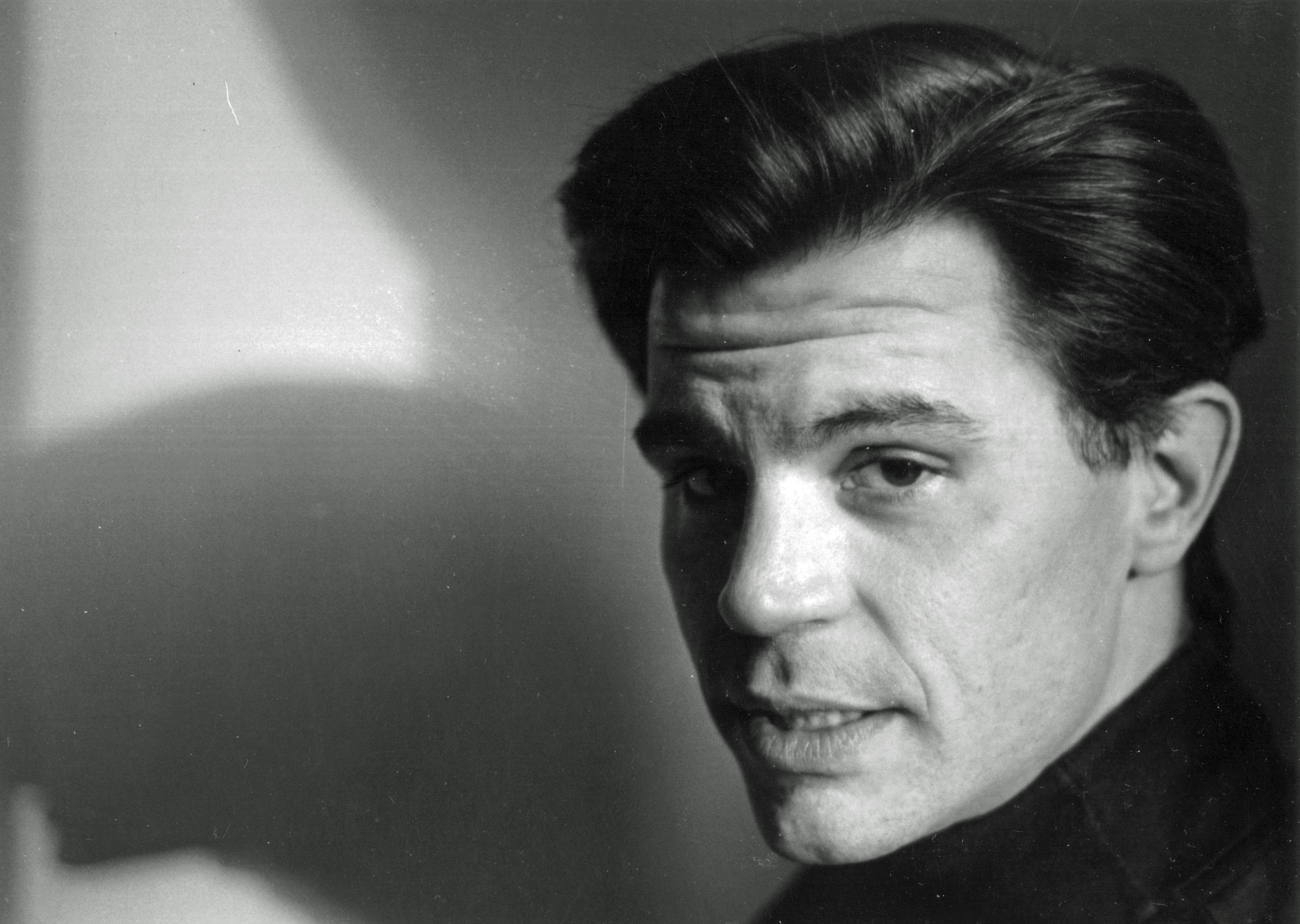
Dick Gallagher

== Early life ==
Gallagher graduated from the Northwestern University School of Music and received a master's degree from the University of Illinois Urbana-Champaign.

== Career ==
He played the piano for performers at many New York City venues, such as Carnegie Hall, Town Hall, the Oak Room at the Algonquin, Rainbow & Stars, and the Carlyle. He was the musical arranger for many performers, including Liza Minnelli and Karen Akers.

For many years he was the arranger, accompanist and conductor for Patti LuPone, and with writer-director Scott Wittman created several shows for LuPone. He was the arranger and musical director for two Lupone shows on Broadway: Matters of the Heart (2000) and Patti LuPone on Broadway (1995).

Gallagher co-wrote scores for several musicals:

- Have I Got a Girl for You: The Frankenstein Musical (with Joel Greenhouse and Penny Rockwell, 1986)
- What Not, which won the 1990 Richard Rodgers Production Award
- Whoop-Dee-Doo! (1993), which was nominated for the 1993 Outer Critics Circle Award and won the Drama Desk Award for Best Musical Revue
- When Pigs Fly (1996), which was produced internationally after an extended run Off-Broadway, and won the 1996 Outer Critics Circle award for Best Musical Revue, and the Drama Desk Award for Best Off-Broadway musical

He also wrote the title song for the Charles Busch play You Should Be So Lucky. and wrote the music for two musicals for the theatre company TheatreWorks/USA: Gold Rush! (with David Armstrong and Mark Waldrop) and A Christmas Carol (with David Armstrong and Mark Waldrop).

He received the MAC Award, Musical Director of the year, in 2004.
