= Old Dogs & New Tricks =

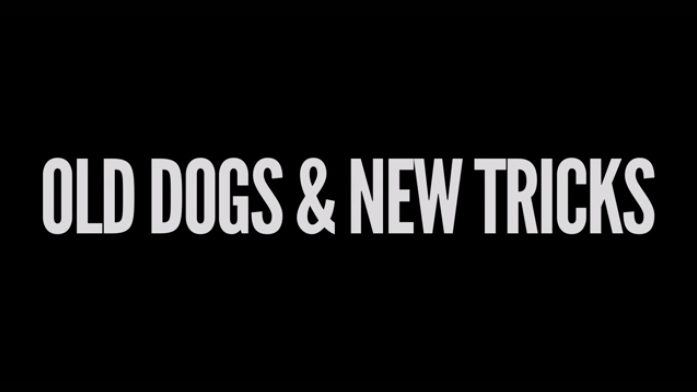
- Genre: Web series; Comedy; LGBT
- Created by: Leon Acord
- Starring: Leon Acord; Curt Bonnem; David Pevsner; Jeffrey Patrick Olson
- Country of origin: United States
- Original language: English
- No. of seasons: 3
- No. of episodes: 24

Production
- Production company: Larilee Productions/Greasy Pig Studios

Original release
- Network: YouTube; Hulu
- Release: January 2012 – present

Old Dogs & New Tricks is a web series created by Leon Acord, and starring Acord, Curt Bonnem, David Pevsner and Jeffrey Patrick Olson. The comedy-drama series is about four middle-aged gay men living in "youth-obsessed West Hollywood".

== Cast ==
Leon Acord stars as Nathan Adler, a 50-year-old gay talent agent whose closest friends include: Brad King (Curt Bonnem), who was a "one-hit wonder" in the late 1980s; Ross Stein (David Pevsner), a former TV leading man in the 1990s; and Al "Muscles" Carter (Jeffrey Patrick Olson), a personal trainer.

Old Dogs & New Tricks has featured guest stars including Greg Louganis, Thom Bierdz, Terri Garber, Ian Buchanan, Patrick Bristow, Rutanya Alda, Kathryn Leigh Scott, Gloria Gifford and Michael Kearns.

== Broadcast ==
The series premiered in January 2012 on YouTube. It was later released on DVD by Wolfe Video, and then made available on Hulu in December 2013.

The first season consists of five episodes, the second season is ten episodes, and the third season is eight episodes plus a special, "WeHo Horror Story". A 2015 Indiegogo online fundraiser secured enough to fund a "4th & Final Season", scheduled for release in 2016.
