= When Pigs Fly (musical) =

1996 musical revue

Howard Crabtree's When Pigs Fly is a musical revue in two acts conceived by Howard Crabtree and Mark Waldrop. The revue has music by Dick Gallagher and lyrics by co-conceiver, sketch writer and director Mark Waldrop. The revue opened Off-Broadway in 1996 and ran for two years, and received the Outer Critics Circle Award for Best Off-Broadway Musical and the Drama Desk Award for Best Musical Revue.

== Production ==
The revue opened Off-Broadway on August 14, 1996 at the Douglas Fairbanks Theatre, and closed on August 15, 1998 after 840 performances. Directed by Mark Waldrop with costumes by Howard Crabtree, the cast included Stanley Bojarski, John Treacy Egan, David Pevsner, Jay Rogers, and Michael West. The title of the show derives from Crabtree's school counselor, who said that Crabtree's ambition to "put on stage shows" would happen "when pigs fly."

Crabtree died on June 28, 1996. Waldrop noted "It's a show...inspired by costumes--and, just by extension, the exuberance of Howard's spirit and his desire to just put it out there.... Without Howard, it's inconceivable that I would have written a gay revue."

An Off-Broadway revival, directed once again by Mark Waldrop, with choreography by Denis Jones and costumes by Bob Mackie, was scheduled to begin previews on October 6, 2017 and open October 30, 2017 at Stage 42. The cast was to feature Jordan Ahnquist, Taylor Crousore, Jacob Hoffman, Brian Charles Rooney and Frank Viveros. However, on October 2, 2017, the producers announced that the revival is canceled. The reason given was that "a shortfall in the show’s investment has made it impossible for the production to continue."

== Concept ==
The concept of the revue is that Howard stages a musical. As he struggles to do so, dealing with the large egos of performers or scenery gone wrong, he hears the words of his high school counselor, Miss Roundhole. She sarcastically said, "When pigs fly!" in response to his ambitions. The characters in the revue (all played by men) appear in sketches: a song to unlikely loves ('Torch Song #1'), four life-sized queens from a deck of playing cards ('You've Got to Stay in the Game'), and dancers making a case for being yourself ('Light in the Loafers'). 'The Melody Barn' is a take-off on classic summer stock themes and 'Laughing Matters' stresses the importance of levity during trying times ("[...] the truth is scarier by far than anything that Stephen King could write [...] human spirits need to be leavened by some levity [...] keep your humor please, 'cause don't you know, it's times like these that laughing matters most of all."). Nathan Lane performed 'Laughing Matters' when he made his final appearance on The Late Show with Stephen Colbert in March 2026, accompanied by Marc Shaiman on piano.

"The wigs alone...are like tone poems of camp: pillowy, cartoon-land creations, threatening to lift the men beneath them somewhere, fully aloft.... Crabtree's visual creations are the reason for this drag-intensive show's being."

== Songs ==
Act 1

- When Pigs Fly
- You've Got To Stay In the Game
- Torch Song #1
- Light In the Loafers
- Coming Attractions
- Not All Man
- Torch Song #2
- A Patriotic Finale

Act 2

- Wear Your Vanity with Pride
- Hawaiian Wedding Day
- Shaft Of Love
- Sam and Me
- Bigger Is Better
- Torch Song #3
- Laughing Matters
- Miss Roundhole Returns/Over the Top/When Pigs Fly

== Critical response ==
In his review for The New York Times, Vincent Canby wrote that the revue is "...an exceptionally cheerful, militantly gay new musical revue that comes close to living up to its own billing, 'the side-splitting musical extravaganza.' No sides are ever in serious danger of splitting. Yet there's enough hilarity, wit and outre humor here to evoke that era, more than 40 years ago, when bright, irreverent revues were as commonplace on Broadway as today's stately Cameron Mackintosh spectacles."

In the Talkin' Broadway review of a regional production in San Francisco, the reviewer wrote: "The music by Dick Gallagher is jaunty and tuneful and lyrics by Mark Waldrop are sharp and witty. This is a real great musical comedy revue. Michael Sommers of The Star Ledger sums it up beautifully by calling it 'A Hog-Heaven of silliness.' Clive Barnes of the New York Post said 'This show is user-friendly for straights.' I totally agree with both critics."

== Recording ==
The original cast recording was released by RCA Victor.

== Awards and nominations ==
When Pigs Fly won the 1997 Outer Critics Circle Awards for Off-Broadway Musical and costume design, as well as the Drama Desk Awards for Off-Broadway revue and costume design. Additional awards were the Lucille Lortel Award for costume design, and an all-around OBIE.
