= Kevin Stea =

American dancer, choreographer, actor

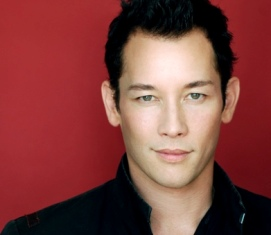
- Born: October 17, 1969 (age 57); Hollywood, California, U.S.
- Occupations: Dancer; choreographer; actor; singer; director; model
- Years active: 1989–present

Kevin Alexander Stea (born October 17, 1969) is an American dancer, choreographer, actor, singer, director and model. He has worked as a dancer and choreographer with a number of high-profile artists, including Madonna, Lady Gaga and Michael Jackson, and has appeared in several movies and television shows.

Stea was an assistant choreographer and dance captain for Madonna's Blond Ambition Tour in 1990, and subsequently appeared in the 1991 documentary film Madonna: Truth or Dare. In January 1992, along with fellow dancers Oliver Crumes and Gabriel Trupin, Stea filed a lawsuit in the Los Angeles Superior Court against Madonna's production company Boy Toy Inc, Miramax Films and Propaganda Films, alleging fraud and invasion of privacy as a result of the documentary. Because of the international notoriety of Madonna, the suit became a pervasive media topic with Stea discussed in the news and appearing on talk shows such as Maury Povich. After more than two years of litigation, the suit was withdrawn in October 1994 and an undisclosed settlement was reached.

While the suit made its way through the courts, Stea went on to lay out a solid foundation for his professional career: appearing in the role of Swifty The Rake in the Disney musical Newsies, touring in the Glorious Revolution tour with Japanese pop-star Seiko Matsuda, and working with Michael Jackson by appearing in the iconic MTV 10th Anniversary live performance of "Will You Be There" 1991, and then going on to serve as the associate choreographer for the official videos "Black or White" and "Blood on the Dance Floor".

== Early life ==
Kevin Stea was born in Hollywood, California, and is half-Caucasian and half-Chinese. His father owned a Chinese restaurant in Downtown Los Angeles. He grew up in various places in the United States (California; Marlette, Michigan; Eugene, Oregon; Milwaukee, Wisconsin and Santa Fe, New Mexico), and then completed his high school education in Singapore on a scholarship at the United World College of South East Asia, as a boarder, where he received the International Baccalaureate Diploma. Following that, he went on to the University of Southern California School of Cinema-Television, which he left to pursue a dance career.

== Career ==
=== Dancing and choreography ===
A gymnast while in his youth, Stea began dancing seriously while he was at college. A year after his first dance job, he was hired by Madonna as a dance captain, dancer and assistant choreographer on her 1990 Blond Ambition Tour. Stea appeared several times in the documentary Truth or Dare, which was made about the tour. Along with Oliver Crumes and Gabriel Trupin who appeared in the documentary, Stea sued Madonna in the Los Angeles Superior Court for fraud and invasion of privacy, claiming that she had lied about the film and that they were not paid for their appearance in it. According to Stea, "Madonna told me she had a crush on me when we first started. And I thought she hated me.." Leslie C. Dunn and Nancy A. Jones in their book Embodied Voices: Representing Female Vocality in Western Culture (1997) argue that Stea and the other two dancers viewed Madonna as a motherly figure, a "mommy dearest".

Subsequently, Stea danced and assisted with choreography for Michael Jackson. He has also worked with numerous other high-profile music acts including Prince, Ricky Martin, Janet Jackson, George Michael, David Bowie, Celine Dion, Herb Alpert, Macy Gray, Anastacia, Rihanna, Lady Gaga, Beyoncé, Britney Spears, Cher, Christina Aguilera, Tony Bennett, will.i.am, Jane's Addiction, A. R. Rahman (India), Seiko Matsuda (Japan), and the Pussycat Dolls. In 2009, he danced in "The Question", by J.T. Horenstein at the Ricardo Montalbán Theatre.

In the mid-1990s, Stea worked in Italy, performing, singing and choreographing on a variety of television shows including Buona Domenica, Non Dimenticate Lo Spazzolino Da Denti and Carramba Che Sorpresa.

=== Fashion modeling ===
Also in the 1990s, Stea began working as a fashion model for such designers as Tommy Hilfiger and Calvin Klein in Los Angeles; Exte, Fendi, Nicola Trussardi and Romeo Gigli in Milan; and Jean-Paul Gaultier and Jose Levy in Paris. He also choreographed runway shows for Thierry Mugler in Los Angeles and appeared on the runway as a dancer for Gucci presentation in Los Angeles. He has also appeared in fashion spreads in high end magazines such as Harper’s Bazaar (Italy) and on the cover of the Cosmopolitan (magazine) European Edition. His modeling work continued with a 2009 spread in Fantasticsmag and a runway stint for the Band of Outsiders line in Florence in June 2011.

He also modeled in the works of fashion/artist photographers such as Peter Palladino, Herb Ritts, Robert Deutschman, Reggie Casagrande, Peggy Sirota, Dan Nix, Maurizio Montani and Andrea Marino. Of particular note is his work on several projects with artist/photographer David LaChapelle. He modeled in LaChapelle's homage to Bruce Lee and Chinese Pop Culture, part of the “Raft” exhibition that opened in Hong Kong in May 2011 at de Sarthe Fine Art.

He also sings and performs under the name That Rogue Romeo and released the album "Machine & Magic" on June 4, 2012, at the Ripples club in Long Beach, California.

=== Acting and commercials ===
In 1995, he starred as Daryl in Paul Verhoeven's Showgirls, a film which was a major flop and often considered one of the worst films ever made but which began to develop a cult following in 2006. Stea has appeared in numerous movies and television series, mainly in dancer roles, including Newsies, Melrose Place, Sister Act 2: Back in the Habit, Showgirls, The Birdcage, Across the Universe, Fired Up, Charlie's Angels, Friends, Austin Powers in Goldmember, 13 Going on 30, Rent, Scrubs, Dancing with the Stars, Rumor Has It... and Naked Boys Singing. He has appeared in over 50 commercials, most notably for Gap, Old Navy and Pepsi.

Mr. Stea is featured in the 2015 documentary Strike a Pose directed by Ester Gould and Reijer Zwaan. The film was partially financed by the International Documentary Film Festival Forum Award, Amsterdam, and was produced by CTM Docs and The Other Room in coproduction with Serendipity Films and NTR. The documentary follows the lives of Madonna’s Blond Ambition dancers twenty-five years later; the dancers sharing their own stories about life during and after the famed 1990 tour.

The film premiered at the 2016 Berlin International Film Festival where it received the second place Panorama audience award for a documentary. The film went on to have its American premiere at the Tribeca Film Festival in New York, the Latin American premiere at the Buenos Aires International Festival of Independent Cinema BAFICI, and premiered April 28 at the largest documentary festival in the world: Hot Docs Canadian International Documentary Festival. The film has received favorable reviews in important journals worldwide, including: The New York Times, 4/14/2016, The Independent (UK) 2/9/2016, The Huffington Post (US) 2/17/2016, Deutsche Welle (Germany) 2/19/2016, The Village Voice, New York, i-D Magazine (US/UK) 2/19/2016, Toronto Star, 5/3/2016, Arte TV (France/Belgium), The Playlist (IndieWire.com) 2/21/2016, The Hollywood Reporter (Hollywood) 2/21/2016, Die Welt (Berlin) 2/21/2016, Rolling Stone (German edition) 2/19/2016, Vibe (magazine), Hollywood, 5/2/3016, GoWithTheVlo (Netherlands) 2/15/2016, People (magazine), Hollywood 4/13/2016 and again in People (magazine), Hollywood, 4/15/2016 and El Mundo 2/17/2016.
