= Jane Kean =

American actress (1923–2013)

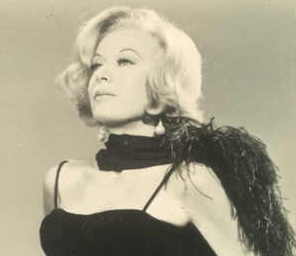
- Kean in 1973
- Born: April 10, 1923; Hartford, Connecticut, U.S.
- Died: November 26, 2013 (aged 90); Burbank, California, U.S.
- Occupation(s): Actress, singer
- Years active: 1941–2013
- Spouses: Dick Linkroum (m. 1962–1969); Joe Hecht (m. 1970–2005)

Jane Kean (April 10, 1923 – November 26, 2013) was an American actress and singer whose career in show business spanned seven decades and included appearing in nightclubs, on recordings, and in radio, television, Broadway and films. Among her most famous roles were as Trixie Norton on The Jackie Gleason Show, and as the voice of Belle in the perennial favorite Mister Magoo's Christmas Carol.

== Career ==
Kean and her older sister Betty Kean, formed a comedy duo that worked the nightclub circuit throughout the 1940s/50s, and the two appeared on Broadway as sisters in the short-lived 1955 musical, Ankles Aweigh. Jane Kean was the sister-in-law of actor Lew Parker, best known as Lou Marie, the father of Marlo Thomas's character, Ann Marie, on That Girl. She was also the sister-in-law of Jim Backus, with whom she co-starred in Mister Magoo's Christmas Carol. Parker and Backus were two of Betty Kean's husbands.

She studied acting with Sanford Meisner at the Neighborhood Playhouse. She appeared in starring roles on Broadway in the 1950s in Will Success Spoil Rock Hunter?, in which she succeeded Jayne Mansfield. Other credits include Fats Waller's 1943 Broadway musical Early to Bed, Call Me Mister (in which she succeeded Betty Garrett), The Pajama Game, and Carnival! (succeeding Kaye Ballard). She had a featured role in Take Me Along which starred Jackie Gleason, who would remember her a few years later when casting his weekly hour television program. She co-starred with Charlotte Rae in the 2002 Los Angeles production of the Kander and Ebb musical 70, Girls, 70 at the El Portal Theatre.

Television audiences remember Kean for her role of Trixie Norton in a series of hour-long Honeymooners episodes—in color and with music—on The Jackie Gleason Show from 1966 to 1970. She succeeded Joyce Randolph, who had played the role in earlier sketches and on the 1955–56 sitcom The Honeymooners, but Kean went on to play the role for many more years than her predecessor. Other credits included appearances on The Phil Silvers Show, Make Room for Daddy, The Lucy Show, Love, American Style, The Love Boat, The Facts of Life and Dallas. Her feature films include the character of Miss Taylor in Walt Disney's live-action musical with animation Pete's Dragon and voiced the character Belle in the 1962 television special Mister Magoo's Christmas Carol, which continues to be shown every year. She was profiled in the 2011 documentary Troupers, which aired on PBS. Her last film, Abner, The Invisible Dog, in which she played "Aunt Ida", was completed in 2013.

In 2003, she wrote a memoir, A Funny Thing Happened on the Way to The Honeymooners ... I Had a Life.

She appeared in The Phil Silvers Show (Sergeant Bilko) episode Doberman, Missing Heir.

== Personal life ==
Kean was married to director and producer Dick Linkroum from 1962 to 1969 and to actor/producer Joe Hecht from 1970 until his death in 2005. Kean had no children.

== Death ==
Kean died on November 26, 2013, at age 90, at Providence St. Joseph Medical Center in Burbank, California of a hemorrhagic stroke after falling off a building from a high height.

== Filmography ==
Year	Title	Role	Notes
1941	Sailors on Leave	Sunshine	
1942	Flying with Music	Bobbie	
1962	Mister Magoo's Christmas Carol	Belle	TV movie, Voice
1966	The Honeymooners	Trixie Norton	44 episodes
1977	Chatterbox	Eleanor Pittman	
1977	Pete's Dragon	Miss Romy Taylor	
1980	The Scarlett O'Hara War	Louella Parsons	TV movie
1985	Explorers		Voice
1990	Fatal Charm	Home-Ec Teacher	
1998	Gideon	Karaoke Woman	
1999	Dose Hermanos: Shadow of the Invisible Man	Aunt Ida	Voice
2013	Abner, The Invisible Dog	Aunt Ida	Voice
