= Whoop-Dee-Doo! =

Whoop-Dee-Doo! is a deliberately ramshackle musical revue subtitled "a postage stamp extravaganza". It is named after the 1903 Broadway revue Whoop-Dee-Doo. It was conceived, created and developed by Charles Catanese, Howard Crabtree, Dick Gallagher, Phillip George, Peter Morris and Mark Waldrop. Songs and sketches by Dick Gallagher, Peter Morris and Mark Waldrop. Additional material by Brad Ellis, Jack Feldman, David Rambo, Bruce Sussman and Eric Schorr.

A co-production of The Glines and Postage Stamp Xtravaganzas, it opened at Actors Playhouse, 100 Seventh Avenue South, New York City, June 16, 1993, and closed February 20, 1994, after a run of 271 performances. Director: Phillip George. Musical Director: Fred Barton. Set Design: Bill Wood, Costume Design: Howard Crabtree, Lighting Design: Tracy Dedtrickson. Choreographer: David Lowenstein Cast: Howard Crabtree, Keith Cromwell, Tommy Femia, David Lowenstein, Peter Morris, Jay Rogers, Ron Skobel, Richard Stegman and Alan Tulin. Executive Producers: Charles Catanese, John Glines, Michael Wantuck.

The songs and sketches are written to showcase extravagant costumes designed by Howard Crabtree. Despite the exuberantly camp style, the songs belie their surface silliness and the show's apparent amateurishness, and often have a serious point: "Born This Way" is a rousing song about the nature vs. nurture debate of the origins of homosexuality, "Last One Picked" looks at gay schooldays, and "A Soldier's Musical" makes points about gays in the military.

Whoop-Dee-Doo! won 1994 Drama Desk Awards in two categories: Best Musical Revue and Outstanding Costume Design (Howard Crabtree). In 1995 RCA Victor made a "Nearly Original Cast Recording".

In 1994 the Kings Head Theatre in London staged a production of the show, with Christopher Biggins taking Jay Rogers' role as the lead cast member always complaining about the quality of the production, and drag performer Earl Grey taking Tommy Femia's role as Judy Garland and other gay icons in the number You Are My Idol. Other cast members included Ashley Knight, Ray C. Davis, Michael Gyngell and Jon Peterson.
