= David Pevsner =

American actor and singer-songwriter

- Born: December 31, 1958 (age 67); Skokie, Illinois, U.S.
- Education: Carnegie Mellon University (Bachelor of Fine Arts)
- Occupations: Actor; singer; writer

David Pevsner (born December 31, 1958) is an American actor, singer, dancer, and writer. Pevsner appeared in the 1990 revival of Fiddler on the Roof, 1991 revival of Rags, and some other theatrical productions. He also wrote three songs for the 1999 musical Naked Boys Singing!, including "Perky Little Porn Star." He wrote and produced two one-person shows, To Bitter and Back (2003) and Musical Comedy Whore (2013). Pevsner portrayed mostly minor roles in films and television. His major screen roles are Ebenezer Scrooge in Scrooge & Marley, the 2012 film adaptation of A Christmas Carol, and Ross Stein in a 2011 web series Old Dogs & New Tricks. He recorded the 2016 album Most Versatile, whose album cover pays homage to Bruce Springsteen's album Born in the U.S.A.

== Early life ==
David Pevsner was born December 31, 1958 in Skokie, Illinois. He attended Niles East High School in the same Chicago suburb and participated in its theater program. He graduated from Carnegie-Mellon University with a Bachelor of Fine Arts.

== Career ==
=== Stage work ===
Pevsner appeared in multiple theatrical productions. He appeared in the 1980s revival of a play A Flash of Lightning, written by Augustin Daly, portraying the role of Terry. He also appeared in the 1990 Broadway revival of the musical Fiddler on the Roof, portraying Mendel the Rabbi's son and understudying the role of Motel played by Jack Kenny. He appeared in the 1991 revival of the 1986 musical Rags, set in 1910, portraying the dual roles of Saul and Nathan. He appeared in the 1995 theatrical play Party, portraying the role of Kevin, later succeeded by Marc Wolf. In the play, Kevin, a college teacher who lives with his partner, hosts a party at his apartment, where the males characters play the naked truth-or-dare game. Pevsner appeared in the two-act gay revue musical When Pigs Fly from 1996 to 1998. Pevsner appeared in F*cking Men, the 2009 explicit play written by Joe DiPietro about the lives of gay urban men, portraying Jack, who commits adultery with another man, while his husband does the same.

Pevsner co-wrote the 1999 musical Naked Boys Singing! with the writing team. He wrote three songs for the musical, including "Perky Little Porn Star" and "The Naked Maid." He wrote and performed two one-person shows, a semi-autobiographical To Bitter and Back (2002) and Musical Comedy Whore (2013), which Broadway World called a "musical autobiography."

=== Film and television ===
Pevsner appeared in films, mostly portraying minor roles in such films as The Fluffer (2001) and Adam & Steve (2006). Pevsner portrayed Elizabeth Taylor's doctor in the 2012 Lifetime television film Liz & Dick. He also portrayed Ebenezer Scrooge in Scrooge & Marley, the 2012 film adaptation that tells the gay interpretation of the novel A Christmas Carol.

Pevsner also portrayed minor roles in television series, particularly a bartender of a gay bar in an episode of NYPD Blue. He portrayed a major role of Ross Stein in the 2011 gay web drama series Old Dogs & New Tricks, which ran four seasons till its ending in 2016. In the series, his character Ross is a former 1990s television star and married to his more successful partner. Pevsner also appeared as the host of the web series Disorganized Zone, a parody of The Twilight Zone. He also appeared in the fourth episode of a 2015 web series Coffee House Chronicles as Jamison, a gay middle-aged man who "bring[s] home a porn star" as his 25th-anniversary present for his partner.

=== Most Versatile (2016) ===
Pevsner recorded the 2016 album Most Versatile, whose title was inspired by his being voted "Most Versatile" in a survey in high school. The album's working title was Shameless, named after his Tumblr blog and "for [being] something with a little skin." The songs of the album explores "a whirlwind of one man's gay experiences" and feature Jim J. Bullock, Maxwell Caulfield, and some others as guest artists. He wrote the lyrics of all thirteen songs. He solely composed seven of those songs and co-composed five of those with several others. Michael Skloff composed one of Pevsner's songs, "I Gotta Give It Up to Love." While "Perky Little Porn Star" and "The Naked Maid" from Naked Boys Singing! are included, the remaining songs are original.

The cover art of the album pays homage to that of Bruce Springsteen's album Born in the U.S.A.. It was designed by a graphic artist Hank Hudson and photographed by Gabriel Goldberg.

== Personal life ==
Pevsner is Jewish and gay.

== Selected works ==
=== Theatre ===
- A Flash of Lightning (1980s revival), Terry – the play was written by Augustin Daly
- Fiddler on the Roof (1990 Broadway revival), rabbi's son Mendel; Mr. (Motel) Kenny – Mr. Kenny was Pevsner's understudy role
- Rags (1991 revival), multiple roles – Doctor, Saul, 14th Street Ballet Dancer, and Nathan
- Party (1995–1996), Kevin – Marc Wolf would later succeed Pevsner portraying the role
- When Pigs Fly (1996–1998)
- F*cking Men (2009), Jack – the play was written by Joe DiPietro

=== Film ===
- David Searching (1997), Scott – a film starring Anthony Rapp and Camryn Manheim
- The Fluffer (2001), Casting Man
- Adam & Steve (2006), Man in Hospital
- Role/Play (2011), Alex
- Liz & Dick (2012), Elizabeth Taylor's doctor – television film
- Scrooge & Marley (2012), Ebenezer Scrooge – 2012 film adaptation of A Christmas Carol
- Joshua Tree, 1951: A Portrait of James Dean

=== Television and web series ===
- NYPD Blue, bartender
- Modern Family
- Grey's Anatomy
- Old Dogs & New Tricks (2011–2016), Ross
- Disorganized Zone, Host – web sci-fi comedy series, a parody of The Twilight Zone
- Coffee House Chronicles (2015), Jamison

=== Written works ===
- Naked Boys Singing! – co-written with the writing team; wrote three songs, including "Perky Little Porn Star" and "The Naked Maid"
- Most Versatile (2016) – solo album
- Damn Shame: A Memoir of Desire, Defiance, and Show Tunes (2022) – book published by Penguin Random House (softcover: ISBN 9781039000506; eBook: ISBN 9781039000513)
