= Dante's Cove =

American soap opera

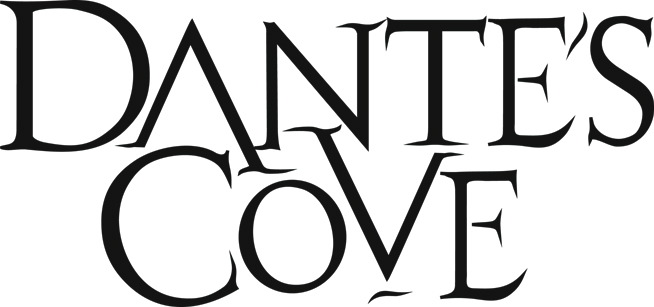
- Genre: Soap opera; Horror; LGBTQ
- Created by: Michael Costanza
- Starring: William Gregory Lee; Tracy Scoggins; Charlie David; Gregory Michael; Nadine Heimann; Josh Berresford; Zara Taylor; Rena Riffel; Erin Cummings; Jill Bennett; Stephen Amell; Jon Fleming; Michelle Wolff; Gabriel Romero; Thea Gill; German Santiago; Jensen Atwood; Reichen Lehmkuhl; Jenny Shimizu
- Opening theme: "Dying to Be with You"
- Composer: Eric Allaman
- Country of origin: United States
- No. of seasons: 3
- No. of episodes: 12

Production
- Running time: 47–52 minutes per episode

Original release
- Network: here!
- Release: October 7, 2005 – December 21, 2007

Related
- The Lair

Dante's Cove is an American LGBTQ-oriented supernatural horror soap opera which aired on Here TV from October 7, 2005, through December 21, 2007. Created and written by Michael Costanza and directed by Sam Irvin, the series combines elements of the horror and soap opera genres in telling the story of Kevin (Gregory Michael) and Toby (Charlie David), a young couple seeking to be together and to overcome the dark mystical forces that conspire to separate them. The show debuted to a mixed critical reception. Although an announcement was made regarding a fourth season, no fourth season was produced.

== Plot ==
Young couple Kevin and Toby arrive in Dante's Cove, home to a sect dedicated to the supernatural religion Tresum. By freeing the charismatic Ambrosius from his magical imprisonment, Kevin reignites a rivalry between Ambrosius and the Tresum Avatar Grace that has simmered for over 150 years. Ambrosius's obsession with claiming Kevin and Grace's own obsession with avenging herself on Ambrosius threaten to tear Kevin and Toby apart forever, with unforeseen collateral damage.

=== Mythology ===
Tresum is a supernatural religion within the Dante's Cove universe, similar in all things but names to witchcraft. It is overseen by a council of unknown composition which acts through envoys, although there are rogue practitioners, like those of Dante's Cove, who don't abide by the council's rule. Tresum practitioners are shown to be able to teleport, control minds and kill with a glance.

All practitioners of Tresum are divided into two houses: Moon, related to water and female energy, and Sun related to fire and male energy, each having a book unreadable to non-initiates in which its knowledge is kept. A third house, Sky, is stated to combine both houses, with a book merging the knowledge of both. A fourth house, Shadows, is revealed as a major threat in season three, having previously been imprisoned by the other houses.

Within the mythology of Dante's Cove, Saint is an entheogenic drug local to the Dante's Cove area, obtained from a plant. In non-practitioners, it produces a euphoric high, sometimes accompanied by a prophetic trance. For Tresum practitioners, it induces visions of the past and future and enhances their magical abilities.

== Cast ==
Cast of Season 1

- William Gregory Lee as Ambrosius "Bro" Vallin
- Tracy Scoggins as Grace Neville
- Charlie David as Toby Moraitis
- Nadine Heimann (seasons 1–2) as Van
- Josh Berresford (season 1; guest season 2) as Cory Dalmass
- Zara Taylor (season 1) as Amber
- Stephen Amell (season 1) & Jon Fleming (seasons 2–3) as Adam
- Gregory Michael as Kevin Archer
- Erin Cummings (season 2) & Jill Bennett (season 3) as Michelle
- Gabriel Romero (season 2; guest season 3) as Marco Laveau
- German Santiago (season 2) as Kai
- Thea Gill (seasons 2–3) as Diana Childs
- Michelle Wolff (season 3; guest season 2) as Brit
- Reichen Lehmkuhl (season 3) as Trevor
- Jenny Shimizu (season 3) as Elena
- Jensen Atwood (season 3) as Griffen
- Jourdain Dion aka Dylan Jordan (season 1) as Raymond the Valet

== Episodes ==
Season	Episodes	Originally released	
Season	Episodes	First released	Last released
1	2	October 7, 2005	November 5, 2005
2	5	September 1, 2006	November 1, 2006
3	5	October 19, 2007	December 21, 2007

=== Season 1 (2005) ===
No. overall	No. in season	Title	Directed by	Written by	Original release date
1	1	"In the Beginning"	Sam Irvin	Mike Costanza & Michael Oblowitz	October 7, 2005
In 1840, Ambrosius Vallin is engaged to marry Grace Neville in the island town of Dante's Cove. When she discovers Ambrosius having sex with his valet, she uses her powers as the Avatar, or high priestess, of one sect of the mystical religion, called Tresum, to kill the valet. Grace imprisons Ambrosius in the sub-basement of her home, cursing him with advanced age. The only way he can win his freedom is through the kiss of a handsome young man. In the present, Kevin moves to Dante's Cove to be with his boyfriend Toby, after moving out of his home to get away from his abusive, homophobic stepfather. He moves in with Toby in Grace's old house, now the Hotel Dante, along with Toby's lesbian artist friend Van and Toby's childhood friend, Adam, who is a straight "trust fund brat." Kevin begins seeing visions and hearing voices calling him by name. During a party, Kevin is drawn to the sub-basement and finds Ambrosius. Ambrosius kisses him, regaining his youth and freedom. Ambrosius uses his own Tresum powers, learned while he was in captivity, to force Kevin to cut his wrist, landing Kevin in the hospital.
2	2	"Then There Was Darkness"	Sam Irvin	Mike Costanza & Michael Oblowitz	November 5, 2005
Ambrosius quickly becomes obsessed with Kevin, using his Tresum powers to seduce him. Grace, still jealous and angry over Ambrosius's betrayal, murders Kevin in the hospital. Enraged, Ambrosius attacks Grace and imprisons and ages her as she did him. Through some unknown means, Kevin is restored to life by a kiss from Ambrosius. However, Grace's act breaks the spell that Kevin had been under, leaving him without any memory of Ambrosius. Using a spell from a Book of Tresum she has found, Van reverses this curse and frees Kevin to again be with Toby. Also drawn into Ambrosius's influence is Cory, who also lives at the hotel. Cory develops a Renfield-like fixation on Ambrosius. After Cory tries and fails to break up the couple by lying about their infidelities, the season ends with Ambrosius, deeply obsessed with Kevin, and Cory seemingly murdering Toby and dumping his body in the ocean.

=== Season 2 (2006) ===
Season 2 sees the introduction of several new residents of Dante's Cove, including Kai, an amoral "fixer" who can get anything (and anyone) he wants; Marco, owner of the hot new club H2Eau; Michelle, Van's girlfriend; Brit, a bartender and scuba instructor; Colin, the owner and operator of a private sex club; and Diana, who has a mysterious connection to Ambrosius and Grace. Jon Fleming took over the role of Adam from Stephen Amell. One of Amell's scenes from the first season was re-shot with Fleming for use in the recap of season one to establish him in the role.

No. overall	No. in season	Title	Directed by	Written by	Original release date
3	1	"Some Kind of Magic"	Sam Irvin	Mike Costanza & Donna Lettow	September 1, 2006
Toby washes ashore, having survived Ambrosius's murder attempt, but with a loss of memory. Grace escapes her prison and reclaims her youth. Ambrosius digs up his own grave and recovers a cache of gold coins that his mother buried there. Following Adam's advice, he updates his look and wardrobe and starts calling himself "Bro." Van casts a spell to reveal the truth about what happened to Toby, drawing Grace's attention and her girlfriend Michelle's disapproval. Van promises not to use magic again but, when Grace attacks, the Book of Tresum rises and defends her and Michelle sees the aftermath. Toby, having recovered his memory, follows Cory to Bro's new place and calls Van. Bro begins to strangle Cory and, when Toby tries to intervene, again tries to murder him. Van arrives and instinctively defeats Bro, casting him and Cory far out to sea. Adam later finds Cory's body washed up on shore. Michelle delivers Van an ultimatum to leave the island with her. Instead, Van casts a spell to make Michelle forget the magic. The spell backfires, wiping out Michelle's memory of Van completely.
4	2	"Playing with Fire"	Sam Irvin	Liz Lachman	September 15, 2006
Van and Toby spot Bro at Cory's funeral. After meeting the mysterious Diana Childs, Van gets into an argument with the amnesiac Michelle and Brit. Van then seeks out Grace, asking her to teach her Tresum, but Grace refuses because Van is unwilling to swear herself to Grace's service. Michelle and Brit have sex but Michelle is troubled by visions of Van. Bro visits Diana, who warns him not to reveal her secrets. In flashback, it is revealed that Diana taught Ambrosius Tresum during his captivity. Van and Grace perform a spell to repel any "love magic" directed at Kevin by Ambrosius. At his new construction job at the hotel, a co-worker puts the moves on Kevin. Toby catches them and makes Kevin move out. Diana tells Ambrosius that he has to secure a willing Aspirant before the upcoming Solstice. Diana insinuates herself further with Van, who offers her services as a house cleaner. As an after-effect of Van's spell on her, Michelle is tormented by memory flashes.
5	3	"Come Together"	Sam Irvin	Patrick Moore	October 1, 2006
Van sketches Grace, who is surprised to see that Van has included Diana in the picture. Grace confronts Diana and it is revealed that they are sisters. Diana says that the power of Tresum has been dammed up since Grace's wedding to Ambrosius was cancelled and Grace says that at the Solstice all the blocked power will flow into her. Adam starts to spin out of control, abusing the local drug Saint. Under its influence he begins to realize his true sexual orientation, having sex with Bro. Kevin and Toby reconcile. Van has a disturbed night's sleep and is awakened on the beach by Diana.
6	4	"Spring Forward"	Sam Irvin	Mary Feuer	October 15, 2006
Van cleans Diana's house, discovering a broken china doll and a page from a Book of Tresum that she cannot read. The page, as revealed in the flashback, was given to Diana by her father shortly before her mother killed him. Her father also gave her the Book of the Sun House of Tresum. Van takes the page to Grace, who takes it away from her. Diana later discovers the page is missing and confronts Grace, who tells her she knows that the upcoming Solstice is a Libra Solstice. Adam continues to spiral downward and the housemates stage an unsuccessful intervention. Van follows Adam, trailing him to a hot spring where Saint grows. She discovers, after returning to the hotel, that she can now read more of the Book of Tresum. She later learns from Grace that this is a result of the Saint, which Tresum practitioners call "starflower." Bro casts a spell to learn details of Kevin's past, including learning about his first love, Derrick. Bro has Kevin tune up his car and gives him a bracelet in payment. Toby is incensed when he sees the bracelet and Van discovers it has a spell on it. Toby throws it into the ocean. An out-of-control Adam ends up having sex with members of the new private sex club before collapsing on the Hotel Dante lawn. Toby cares for him as he detoxes. Diana and Ambrosius talk of the upcoming Libra Solstice, revealing that in three days, one Tresum practitioner will gain power over time. They plot to keep Grace from attaining power so Diana can go back in time to save her father and "save Tresum from Grace." Van returns to the spring and gains the ability to read Diana's Libra Solstice page. Michelle, growing ever more tormented, confronts Van with a photograph of them together. Van still denies knowing her and, distraught, Michelle walks into the ocean and drowns.
7	5	"The Solstice"	Sam Irvin	Erik Jackson & Donna Lettow	November 1, 2006
Derrick, Kevin's ex, arrives at Dante's Cove for his bachelor party. With the Libra Solstice at hand, Van agrees to become Grace's Aspirant to gain the chance to save Michelle. Ambrosius makes another attempt to enchant Kevin through the use of the china doll, which has a powerful love charm on it. The charm leads Derrick to try to seduce Kevin and for Marco and Kai to have sex. Bro uses the charm to try to get Adam and Toby together, but Toby's true love for Kevin overcomes the charm. Toby destroys the charm by breaking the doll, but Bro uses his Tresum powers to control Toby. Ambrosius then threatens Kevin to become his aspirant or else he will never see Toby again. Kevin agrees and Ambrosius binds them together with the recovered enchanted bracelet. Grace and Van arrive at the spring early and perform the ritual. Bro intervenes and attacks Grace. Grace and Bro draw upon the strength of their respective Aspirants in the battle, but Toby interferes. Grace gains the upper hand and seemingly disintegrates Bro. Suddenly Diana appears and defeats Grace. As Diana prepares to claim the Libra power to save her father and destroy her mother, Van beseeches her to give life instead of taking it. Diana relinquishes the power to Van, allowing her to go back in time to save Michelle. The following day Michelle leaves for home. Bro suddenly reappears and claims Kevin. The two vanish before Toby's and Van's eyes.

=== Season 3 (2007) ===
Season 3 sees more new additions to the Dante's Cove cast and some departures, notably Nadine Heimann as Van, who is presumed dead. Another absent character is Kai. New characters include Trevor (Reichen Lehmkuhl), a possible love interest for Adam; Elena (Jenny Shimizu), an antiquarian who is involved with Brit; and Griffen (Jensen Atwood), an Emissary of the Tresum Council. Jill Bennett replaced Erin Cummings in the role of Michelle. Similar to how the transition between "Adams" was handled in season two, shots of Bennett were inserted into the recap of season two to establish her as Michelle.

No. overall	No. in season	Title	Directed by	Written by	Original release date
8	1	"Sex and Death (and Rock and Roll)"	Sam Irvin	Mike Costanza & Mary Feuer	October 19, 2007
Toby awakens from a nightmare vision of Van's apparent death. It is six months later and Kevin is living with Ambrosius. Bro is now a silent partner with Marco, having invested money to rebuild H2Eau, which was washed away in a tsunami that levelled the leeward side of the Cove. Brit is now seeing an antiquarian named Elena and studying the chaotic tidal patterns around the Cove. Kevin finally gets to see Toby away from Bro at the bar. Kevin claims to be happy with Bro. The next morning, a burst of light from the sky deposits Grace on the shore. While walking to her estate, a man offers her a lift. He introduces himself as Griffen, or "Griff" for short, an Emissary of the Tresum Council. Griff tells her that he has come to see Diana. Arriving at her windward estate, Grace is shocked to learn that various Cove residents have moved in following Van's death and the destruction of the hotel. She allows the renters to stay until the end of the month. Griff warns Diana not to try to correct the errors caused by her failure at the Libra solstice. Grace later confronts Diana, accusing her of causing the tsunami. Noticing Griff outside Diana's shop, Grace asks him why her powers are so weak. He tells her it is a result of her six months "in limbo" and that full control of her magic should return eventually. At Bro's beach house, Kevin sneaks away and casts a spell that takes him momentarily to Toby. Kevin attempts to assure Toby that he wants to return, but Toby assumes it was a dream. That night, Toby is closing the bar when he is greeted by Michelle, who has returned to the Cove searching for Van. Toby tells her that Van is dead. Michelle explains that her parents were murdered by something evil. She asks both Toby and Marco if they might be able to help her perform Tresum spells to stop the evil but balks when either suggests asking either Grace or Bro for help. Adam, still in love with Toby, has also been spending time with Trevor. Convinced that he will never have Toby, Adam has sex with Trevor. Later, Grace recruits Trevor to be her eyes and ears in addition to being her handyman. Toby spies on Kevin with Bro at their beach house. He later mentions to Adam that Kevin seems genuinely happy with Bro, and seemingly agrees to end his relationship with Kevin. That night, Diana, in defiance of the Council, continues to invoke Tresum spells. Griff arrives, repeating his warning to stop. Diana shrugs him off, forcing Griff to strip her of her powers. Back at H2Eau, Marco tries to get Grace's attention. He warns her of a "dark force" in Dante's Cove, showing her the stone of his ring that darkens in the presence of dark energy, but Grace dismisses his concerns. He decides to go see Bro. He never makes it there, as he is attacked on the beach by a demonic-appearing Michelle.
9	2	"Blood, Sugar, Sex, Magik"	Sam Irvin	Paul Etheredge	November 9, 2007
Michelle seeks out Diana for help in finding out who killed her parents. A powerless Diana initially refuses but later relents. Grace discovers Marco's dismembered body on the beach and takes his mystic ring off his finger, experiencing an incomplete vision of his death. At Marco's funeral, Michelle embraces Brit to Elena's consternation. Grace tries to advise Ambrosius about Marco's warning, but he is unreceptive. Bro then announces to all attending the service that he will be taking over as owner of H2Eau. Grace casts a spell to reveal Marco's killer, but it fails. She realizes that she needs a star flower and determines to get some from Diana. That night at H2Eau, two clubgoers exhale a puff of Saint smoke into Adam's face. He experiences mystical visions before collapsing. When he comes to, he sees that Toby has remained vigilant for him. Toby accuses him of using again, but Adam angrily denies it, saying that though he does not want the drug, the drug may want him. Kevin casts a spell on Bro which inadvertently kills him. He manages to reverse the spell, bringing Bro back to life. The next day, Bro attempts a spell on Toby which fails. He goes to Diana for an explanation, who points him in Griff's direction. Bro confronts him, but Griffen convinces him that he is not responsible for his problem. Griff later explains that Bro can replenish his energy by having sex with men other than Kevin. Michelle and Diana begin researching ancient Tresum scrolls and share an unexpected kiss. Diana excuses herself to find more scrolls, and Michelle takes the opportunity to slip a few drops of her own blood into Diana's tea. Grace arrives demanding a starflower from Diana, who has none. Grace leaves for the spring. Diana calls out for Michelle, who hid from Grace and finishes the blood-spiked cup of tea. But Michelle has slipped away, and in her demonic form, uproots all of the starflower. Grace arrives at the spring later with Trevor to discover the shredded plant, but Trevor salvages a small sprig. Meanwhile, Brit discovers a mysterious chest during a late-night scuba dive. Bro informs Toby that Adam is starting as H2Eau's newest bartender. Toby confronts Bro, accusing him of forcing Adam to work for him, but Bro denies the use of magic, or that he has any sexual interest in Adam. After Adam's shift ends, Toby tries to convince him to quit. Adam explains that his parents have cut off his allowance because he refused to leave Dante's Cove so that he could stay with Toby. Toby finally gives in, and he and Adam have sex for the first time. Diana, drinking another cup of the spiked tea, reads in her scrolls of the same dark force that Grace, finally able to cast her to reveal spell, discovers—the House of Shadows.
10	3	"Sexual Healing"	Sam Irvin	Jason Crain	November 23, 2007
Diana is tormented by spectral voices. She angrily accuses Griffen of being behind them, but as the torment continues it is revealed that Michelle is the source. Brit, Elena, and Kevin manage to open the box that Brit retrieved from the ocean but find it empty. Later, Kevin touches a symbol on the box's lid and experiences a rush of energy. Bro decides to release Kevin from his bondage, but the very night he plans to do so, he discovers that Kevin has been stealing his energy. Kevin attacks Bro magically, and Bro flees to Griffen. Griffen teaches Bro how to draw upon the energy of others. Grace tries to convince Bro to give her his Tresum Book of the Sun, but he denies her, dismissing her fears and the House of Shadows as a myth. At Trevor's birthday party, Grace learns of Adam's visions and entreats him to take Saint with her so she can share them. He refuses. After acquiring some Saint at The Lair, Grace secretly doses Adam and experiences his vision, confirming that it is the House of Shadows that is behind the disturbances in the Cove. Toby later confronts Adam, still high, and Adam denies knowingly taking Saint. Kevin finds Toby at H2Eau, telling him "today's the day." Michelle seduces Brit. Grace tries to convince Bro of the Shadow threat but he dismisses her, calling the House of Shadows a "myth." Grace then seeks out Griffen, who believes her visions of the House of Shadows but who will not align himself with her "rogue magic." The only way he will help her is if she swears allegiance to him and the Tresum Council. Initially, she angrily refuses but her growing fear later compels her to agree to become Griffen's Aspirant. Bro, having drained several men of their energy, returns to confront Kevin. Kevin uncorks a potion that knocks Bro out and draws upon Bro's power to finally remove the bracelet.
11	4	"Like a Virgin"	Sam Irvin	Jason Crain	December 7, 2007
Michelle asks Brit to help her perform a Tresum spell, but because Brit is a scientist, she refuses. Griffin and Grace complete the ritual in which she becomes his Aspirant. They "seal the deal" by making love. Kevin approaches Toby and tells him he has broken free of Ambrosius' control. Bro meanwhile uses a locator spell to see Kevin with Toby, despite him no longer wearing a bracelet. Michelle assaults Elena, who then hides out of sight just before Brit arrives on the scene, discovering her lover bleeding on the floor and screaming for help. Kevin and Toby hear her and suggest using magic to save Elena's life. Toby enlists Grace, whose powers have returned after the night's events. Grace discovers that the House of Shadows has taken a human host after examining Elena's injuries. Kevin returns to Bro's home looking for the Sun Book. Bro tries to reenslave his former captive, but Kevin shrugs off his attempts. Later, needing more power in his desire to get Kevin back, Bro resumes his power-leeching rampage. Grace manages to stabilize Elena, but she explains that she will need either the Moon or Sun Book to get her completely out of the woods. Toby suggests getting Kevin to read the Sun Book (since Grace is a Moon Witch), but Grace says she will need far more experienced help to perform the healing spell. Griff and Grace cast a reveal spell, confirming Grace's suspicions about the Shadows and finally exposing Michelle as their host. As they begin to alert the Cove residents of the danger they face, Grace tells Griff that she deceived him by switching the medallions for the allegiance ceremony, invalidating the entire ritual, meaning they are not aspirant/avatar after all. Still posing as a sympathetic friend, Michelle rejoins a distraught Brit. She convinces Brit to join her in a spell using the Moon Book (which she has had for months) to heal Elena, but Grace arrives in time to drive Michelle away. Upon touching the Moon Book, Grace learns that Van was the first to fall to the Shadows. At The Lair, Trevor stumbles upon Bro amid his indiscriminate draining rampage and becomes his latest victim. Griff and Adam arrive in time to save him from being drained to death. The next day, Brit shows Grace the wooden box that served as the Shadows' ancient prison. Diana arrives, offering to join the effort to help trap them back inside of it. Kevin begs Toby to run away with him but Toby turns him down. Just then, Adam arrives and Toby kisses him, setting off Kevin, who threatens to use magic to force Toby to be with him. Toby calls his bluff, making Kevin back down. However, he refuses to help them stop the Shadows and leaves. Diana and Grace arrive at Michelle's house. She emerges to greet them in full Shadow form.
12	5	"Naked in the Dark"	Sam Irvin	Paul Etheredge	December 21, 2007
Seemingly in preparation to defeat the House of Shadows, Diana asks Grace for her Tresum power. Grace reluctantly consents and her power is transferred to Diana, who incants a spell that draws the Shadows out of Michelle and into her instead. At H2Eau, Diana forces the employees to kill each other and themselves. Ambrosius wonders what the commotion is, only to be greeted by a Shadows-possessed Diana. She attempts to kill him, but Bro manages to escape with the Sun Book. Toby and Adam look for Michelle in her hotel room. They hear what seems like a cry for help coming from the closet. While investigating, Adam is pulled in by the Shadows and Toby almost is as well, but manages to break free. Toby attempts to rescue Adam and becomes infected by the Shadows. Elsewhere on the Cove, Kevin is alarmed by entire buildings burning and runs back to Grace and the others. He offers to use magic to help the others stop the threat, but Grace rejects him as a novice. Toby arrives, fighting off the Shadows' attempt to fully infect him and take him over. Grace prepares to kill him but Kevin uses a spell to free Toby from the Shadows' influence. Grace and the other Cove residents are joined by Bro, now clearly convinced of the threat, and Grace persuades them all to regroup at Griffen's estate. Bro attempts in vain to read the Sun Book's passage on defeating the Shadows, and then Trevor brings him the Moon Book. When the two books come into contact, they magically merge into a larger book that both Sun and Moon Witches can read. Bro tells Griff and Grace about the prophecy meant to stop the House of Shadows, which reads: "A mighty Tresum master will level the playing field in the war against the Shadows. But only a virgin can deliver the killing stroke to close the Shadow portal forever." Bro interprets this to mean that the box is the portal, he and Griff are the Tresum masters, and Grace is the virgin until she informs him that this is no longer the case, apparently leaving them all at square one. Diana arrives, leaving the combatants unprepared to stop her. She immediately plunges the entire Cove into darkness. Trevor finds one of the doors open and becomes possessed by Shadows that used the opening to slip inside. Grace belittles Brit's attempts to protect herself using common weapons until she realizes that Brit's refusal to use magic under clearly supernatural threats makes her the "virgin" in the prophecy, deducing that it refers to one untouched by magic rather than sex. Kevin becomes agitated by the others' back-and-forth debate on how to interpret the prophecy and stop the Shadows, but Grace sends him away. It is in this state that Diana uses a possessed Trevor to lure him outside in an attempt to stop her himself. When the others become aware that Kevin has been manipulated into confronting Diana alone, the three Tresum witches emerge from the estate and retrieve a weakened Kevin. Michelle arrives, claiming she knows how to stop Diana, and joins them inside. Once again, the Shadows seem to emerge from within a closet. Brit and Toby hold the door shut until Toby thinks he hears Adam's voice from within. He opens the door and is sucked in, joining Adam in the Shadows dimension. Diana enters the estate, prompting the three witches to attempt to reimprison the Shadows inside the box, without success. Brit attempts to sneak up on Diana and stab her, but Diana spots and repels her before she gets close enough. Finally, Michelle uses the knife in Brit's hand to stab herself and grabs Diana before falling to the floor. Michelle was correct in surmising that since the Shadows arrived upon her resurrection, she must die for them to be cast out. With Michelle dead, Griff, Grace and Bro succeed in trapping Diana and the Shadows in the box. With the Shadows gone, daylight returns, Elena awakens and is reunited with Brit and Trevor returns to normal. Griff plans to return to the Tresum Council and deliver the box to them, but Grace reveals that she is pregnant with his child. Griff forsakes his allegiance to the council to stay with her to raise their baby. Kevin, having lost Toby, decides that he wants to stay with Bro of his own free will for the first time. As the two kiss, Toby and Adam are seen on the other side of a mirror screaming for help.

== Production ==
The first season was shot in the Turks and Caicos Islands on 35 mm film. Initially intended to be three episodes, the footage was re-edited and packaged as an 84-minute first episode and a 106-minute second episode. These originally aired in the fall of 2005. The historic Turks Head Inne, built in 1830, served as the set for the Hotel Dante in the first season, while many outdoor shots were filmed on Duke Street, and the Grand Turk Lighthouse.

The second season was shot on the north side of Oahu in Hawaii in the spring of 2006. Shooting took place near the filming location of Lost; the cast and crew of the two shows socialized during the shoot. The change in locale and obvious change in sets was for the most part ignored within the series, though actress Tracy Scoggins was given a line about "what a fresh coat of paint can really do." Behind the scenes, however, the change led to shifts in the shooting schedule, notably changes in the number of night scenes filmed because of curfew issues and restrictions imposed. The season was shot entirely on high definition videotape. It was originally intended to be six one-hour episodes, but episodes five and six were condensed into a single one. The season aired in the fall of 2006. The Sullivan Estate, a private luxury spa in Pupukea, served as the set for the Hotel Dante and the bar H2Eau during season 2. The Tropical Rush surf shop in Haleiwa was a real location and was also used frequently for filming in both seasons 2 and 3.

A third season of five one-hour episodes, again filmed in Hawaii, aired in the fall of 2007. After the destruction of the Hotel Dante and half of the island of Dante's Cove between seasons 2 and 3, the cast moves into Grace's second home, which was filmed at the Hale Aloha Estate, a private vacation home in Mokuleia. Many outdoor scenes, including the new H2Eay bar were filmed at Moli’i Gardens in Kualoa Ranch.

== Connections to The Lair ==
Dante's Cove takes place in the same fictional universe as another here! original production, the vampire series The Lair. Characters from The Lair refer to Saint as "the new drug all the kids are doing," being banished by an "Avatar" and covens of witches centered around a spring. These are all components of Tresum, although Tresum has not been mentioned specifically within the series.

Dylan Vox plays a character named Colin in The Lair and in three episodes in season 2 of Dante's Cove. Dialogue in The Lair indicates that his character from that series has been a vampire for a long time, perhaps centuries.

Director Sam Irvin and Charlie David refer to the Cove's sex club as "The Lair" and call the series The Lair "sort of like a spin-off." According to The Lair's Peter Stickles, The Lair was originally intended to be a direct spin-off of Dante's Cove and was originally entitled "Dante's Lair". Early in production the name was changed but the show was intended to be set in the town of Dante's Cove, but eventually the connection was dropped.

The Lair's David Moretti reported on The Lair podcast that he would appear as his Lair character Thom in season three of Dante's Cove (episodes 3 and 4), running the island's sex club in Colin's absence, but did not elaborate on how that will come about. Moretti appeared in the third episode, "Sexual Healing", and the fourth episode, "Like a Virgin", and the Cove's sex club was finally identified by name as "The Lair". Whether this establishes that the two series are indeed set in the same location remains unclear. Thom appears in the second season of The Lair, unaffiliated with the club. He begins season three living in The Lair as the lover of the club's leader Damian.

== DVD releases ==
DVD name	Episodes	Release date	Special features – Region 1
The Complete First Season	2	Region 1: August 8, 2006; Region 4: November 24, 2006 (Season 1 Part 1); March 29, 2007 (Season 1 Part 2); Region 2: January 1, 2008	"Backdoor" featurette
The Complete Second Season	5	Region 1: June 5, 2007; Region 4: September 14, 2007; Region 2: February 25, 2008	Deleted scenes; "On the set" featurette; "Men of Dante's Cove" featurette; "Women of Dante's Cove" featurette; "Out Actors" featurette; "Backdoor" featurette
The Guilty Pleasures Collection	7	Region 1: December 4, 2007	Unaired pilot
The Complete Third Season	5	Region 4: April 10, 2008; Region 1: June 3, 2008; Region 2: August 28, 2008	Production commentaries; Backlot featurette; Photo gallery; Bloopers and deleted scenes

== Critical response ==
Formal reviews for Dante's Cove have been light and the series has failed to attract enough reviewers at Rotten Tomatoes to date to garner a rating. One outlet that has reviewed each of the complete seasons is the lesbian-themed website AfterEllen.com. Season one was deemed "campy, gothic, mysterious, homoerotic, and a bit silly" with the reviewer noting the series' apparent debt to such earlier fare as Dark Shadows and Buffy the Vampire Slayer. These sentiments were echoed by the gay-interest Instinct magazine, which called the series a "guilty pleasure TV hit...with...camp goodness and sexy soap appeal." In looking at season two, AfterEllen's reviewer noted the improved acting and production values and (in keeping with the lesbian focus of the website) expressed appreciation of the central position of the lesbian characters and storyline. Thea Gill in particular has been singled out by reviewers for praise for her performance as Diana Childs.

Series director Sam Irvin has relayed that the fan base is expanding beyond the niche of the LGBT community. "There are gay, lesbian, bisexual and straight people on this show, and certainly maybe more gay and lesbian characters than most shows, but it seems to appeal to a mainstream heterosexual audience, too." At least one straight reviewer disagreed, not because of the sexuality but instead finding the show too "over-the-top."

== Podcast ==
A Dante's Cove podcast was launched through the show's official site and through iTunes on October 6, 2006. The podcast is hosted by New York City DJ Ben Harvey and includes episode recaps and discussion and interviews with the cast. There have been no podcasts released since the airing of the third episode of season three.
