= Mango Kiss =

- Directed by: Sascha Rice
- Written by: Sarah Elisabeth Brown; Sascha Rice
- Produced by: Sascha Rice; Joe Mellis; Erin O'Malley
- Starring: Danièle Ferraro; Michelle Wolff; Sally Kirkland
- Cinematography: John Pirozzi
- Edited by: Lauren Giordano; Cindy Parisotto
- Music by: Matthew Ferraro
- Distributed by: Wolfe Video
- Release date: March 20, 2004
- Running time: 84 minutes
- Country: United States
- Language: English

Mango Kiss is a 2004 American comedy film written Sarah Elisabeth Brown and Sascha Rice, and directed by Sascha Rice. The plot concerns love between two lesbian friends, Lou and Sassafras. It is based on the play Bermuda Triangles, written by Sarah Elisabeth Brown. The story for the play was based on the playwright's experience living within the lesbian subculture found in San Francisco in the 1990s.

== Plot ==
Lou falls in love with her best friend Sassafras, who doesn't know. In order to bring their careers as performance artists forward, they move to San Francisco, where they get into the BDSM scene. Soon they start a princess/daddy role-play: Lou plays out a Sea Captain Daddy role and Sass takes on a brat princess.

== Cast ==
- Danièle Ferraro as Sassafras
- Michelle Wolff as Lou
- Sally Kirkland as Emilia
- Dru Mouser as Leslie
- Tina Marie Murray as Chelsea Chuwawa
- Shannon Rossiter as Micky
- Joe Mellis as Kaz
- Malia Spanyol as Bridget
- Windy Morgan Bunts as Ginny
- Dominique Zeltzman as Sonya
- Lena Zee as Karla
- Alicia Simmons-Miracle as Boss Daddy (billed as Alicia Simmons)
- Laura Baca as Allison
- Max Miller as Val
- Walter Barry as Mr. Fuchsia
- Chris Villa as Mr. Leather (billed as Christopher Villa)
- Delphine Brody as Booze Girl
- Katherine Armstrong as Little Girl on Beach

== Reception ==
Variety's Dennis Harvey calls it "thinly plotted" and writes that the "pic works so hard to render kinkiness precious that the effect is just silly, then downright annoying. Surface elements are saleable enough to give indie production gay-fest legs and decent specialized home-format prospects. Theatrical distribution wooks unwikewy (sic)." Julie E. Washington of the Plain Dealer gave it a B− and says "There's not much plot in "Mango Kiss". Connie Ogle in the Miami Herald gave it 3 stars and finishes " You may cringe at a couple of embarrassing candy metaphors and skeptically view Sass' way-too-frank discussions with her mom (Sally Kirkland), but director Sascha Rice never lets Mango Kiss take itself too seriously. For that, we say: Thank you. ma'am. May we have another?"

== Awards ==
- 2004
  - Park City Film Music Festival (Feature Film: Director's Choice)
    - Gold Medal for Excellence
  - Sydney Mardi Gras Film Festival
    - Best Lesbian Film -
  - Park City Film Music Festival
    - Director's Choice Award: Gold Medal for Excellence
  - North Carolina Gay & Lesbian Film Festival
    - Emerging Filmmaker Award: Best Women's Feature
