= Gregory Michael =

American actor (born 1981)

- Born: Gregory Michael Hosmer; May 30, 1981 (age 45); Philadelphia, Pennsylvania, U.S.
- Occupation: Actor
- Years active: 2002–present
- Website: www.gregorymichael.tv

Gregory Michael (born May 30, 1981) is an American actor.

== Biography ==
Michael was born in Philadelphia, Pennsylvania. He is the only son of Gregory Hosmer and Rosaria DiStefano, and has an older sister, Christina. He attended the Christian Brothers' La Salle College High School in Wyndmoor, Pennsylvania. Michael went on to college to pursue his studies in theatre and acting at Pennsylvania State University. In 2008, Michael resided in Los Angeles, California. Although he has portrayed gay characters on multiple television shows, he stated in a 2006 interview that he is straight and was reported in 2010 to have dated Stephanie Pratt.

== Acting career ==
At a young age, Michael was active in community theater, portraying lead characters in the musicals Blood Brothers, The Music Man, and Damn Yankees, which were performed at the Walnut Street Theatre in Philadelphia, Pennsylvania. In high school, he captured national championship awards in his Dramatic and Humorous Interpretation of literature, in competing with the National Forensics League, under the coaching of the late Brother Rene Sterner FSC.

Michael's first professional work was for Walt Disney Entertainment, at Walt Disney World in Orlando, Florida as a character performer. The Walt Disney World Christmas Day Parade was one of Michael's first appearances on television. Michael's notable television roles include; "Clark Watson" on the CBS soap opera As the World Turns, "Kevin Archer", in the supernatural gothic soap opera Dante's Cove, and "Grant Ellis" on ABC Family's Greek.

== Filmography ==
=== Television ===
Year	Title	Role	Notes
2003–2004	As the World Turns	Clark Watson	32 episodes
2005–2006	Just Legal	Ryan Cern	Episodes: "The Rainmaker", "The Limit"
2005–2007	Dante's Cove	Kevin Archer	13 episodes
2008–2011	Greek	Grant Ellis	20 episodes
2012	How I Met Your Mother	Trey	Episode: "Trilogy Time"
2016	Fall Into Me	Will	Episode: "Delicious"
2018	Famous in Love	Sebastian Graham	Episode: "The Kids Aren't All Right"

=== Film ===
Year	Title	Role	Notes
2005	Running Out of Time In Hollywood	Michael	
2008	The Lovers	Chris	

=== Music videos ===
Year	Song	Artist	Notes
2011	"Outta Control"	J786	Lead
2011	"Girl Next Door"	Marisa Laurén	Lead
2012	"Never Gonna Happen"	Colette Carr	Lead
2014	"Caster of Shame"	Death Angel	Lead
2015	"Calipopicana"	Kylie Hughes	Lead
