= Mike Costanza =

American filmmaker

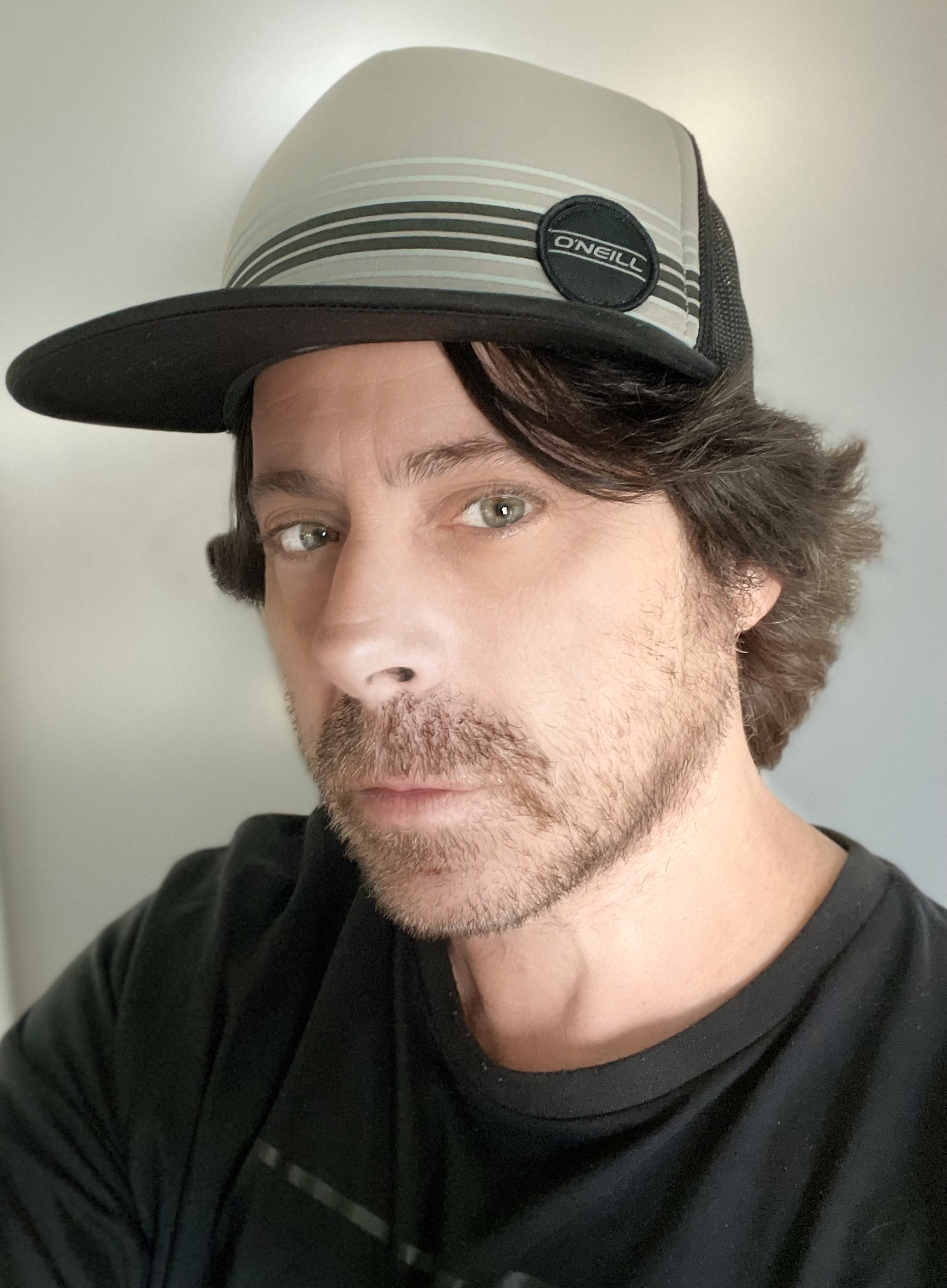
- Born: United States
- Occupations: Filmmaker, writer, director

Michael Costanza is an American filmmaker and award-winning, Palme d'Or-nominated writer and director.

Costanza began his career in the Art Department on feature films at Paramount. He then went on to direct short films and music videos. His short Mama Said screened at Sundance and in the Official Selection of films in competition at The Cannes Film Festival where it was nominated for the Palme d'Or award. Mama Said is a critique of race relations and pop culture of 1960s America. Mama Said also screened on The Sundance Channel.

The Collingswood Story (2002) is Costanza's screenlife horror film, described as "the first true Screenlife horror flick". Years before video conferencing was commonly adopted, The Collingswood Story explored the lives of a young couple attempting a long distance relationship via webcams. Collider referred to it as both the first screenlife horror film and "a new type of found footage horror." In 2005, Collingswood screened at FrightFest in London and The Fearless Tales Film Festival in San Francisco. The film won the Best Indie Film and Best Cast Award. In October 2022, The Collingswood Story began streaming on AMC+ and Shudder.

He is also the creator of the television series Dante's Cove.
