= Marco Rodríguez (actor) =

American film and television actor

- Born: July 10, 1953 (age 73); Los Angeles, California
- Other names: Mark Rodriguez, Marco Rodriguez, Marc Rodriguez
- Education: University of Southern California
- Occupation: Actor
- Years active: 1980–present
- Website: https://marcorodriguez.com/

Marco S. Rodríguez (born July 10, 1953, in Los Angeles, California) is an American actor.

Rodríguez received his Bachelor of Arts degree from the University of Southern California. He was acquainted with Jeff Corey and Jose Quintero. He taught for a short amount of time in the L.A. Unified School District and then began his acting career shortly afterward.

== Filmography ==
- The Baltimore Bullet (1980) - Tony
- Zoot Suit (1981) - Smiley / Ismael Torres
- Hill Street Blues (1981–1985) - Rico (11 episodes)
- Bay City Blues (1983–1984) - Bird (8 episodes)
- Women of San Quentin (1983) - Ray Ortiz
- T.J. Hooker (1984) - Julio Fuente
- Street Hawk (1985) - Pauley
- Lady Blue (1985) - Barranquilla
- Cobra (1986) - Supermarket Killer (as Marco Rodriguez)
- Extreme Prejudice (1987) - Deputy Cortez
- Disorderlies (1987) - Luis Montana
- Star Trek: The Next Generation (1988–1991) Glin Tell / Capt. Paul Rice (2 episodes)
- Another Chance (1989) - Demon
- Tripwire (1989) - El Tigre
- Internal Affairs (1990) - Demetrio
- Maniac Cop 2 (1990) - Convenience Store Robber (uncredited)
- The Rookie (1990) - Loco Martinez
- Street Knight (1993) - Jack Fernandez
- NYPD Blue (1993–2002, various roles in 3 episodes)
- Frasier (1994) - Leo (1 episodes)
- The Crow (1994) - Torres
- ...And the Earth Did Not Swallow Him (1995) - Joaquin
- ER (1995) - Serena, Customs Agent (1 episodes)
- Nash Bridges (1996–2001, 2 episodes) - Ted Madrid / Socrates
- High School High (1996) - Mr. DeMarco
- Black Dawn (1997) - Chapparo
- Seinfeld, "The English Patient" (1997) - Guillermo
- The Base (1999) - Rosato
- My Brother the Pig (1999) - Edwardo
- Dark Nova (1999) - Bishop
- Seven Days (2000) - General Vendiez (1 episode)
- The District (2000) - Pablito Alvarez (1 episode)
- Unspeakable (2002) - Cesar
- A Man Apart (2003) - Hondo
- JAG (2003) - Raul Garcia (2 episodes)
- House of Sand and Fog (2003) - Hondo
- Cold Case (2003–2006) - Manny Fernandez (2 episodes)
- Toolbox Murders (2004) - Luis Saucedo
- Million Dollar Baby (2004) - Second at Vegas Fight
- CSI: Crime Scene Investigation (2005, 1 episodes) - Carlos' Lawyer
- Area 51 (2005) - Ramirez (voice)
- Predator: Concrete Jungle (2005) - Additional Voices
- General Hospital (2006, 2 episodes) - Miguel Escobar
- Bully (2006) - Mr. Castillo (voice)
- Grand Theft Auto: Vice City Stories (2006) - People of Vice City, Commercial
- Hamlet 2 (2008) - Mr. Marquez
- Ready or Not (2009) - Pedro
- Fast & Furious (2009) - Mexican Priest
- Red Dead Redemption (2010) - The Local Population
- Eastbound & Down (2010) - Roger Hernandez (6 episodes)
- Due Date (2010) - Federali Agent
- Final Sale (2011) - Diego
- Desperate Housewives (2011) - Principal Gomez (1 episode)
- Awake (2012) - Marco (1 episode)
- Chuck (2012) - Rocky Falcone (1 episodes)
- NCIS: Los Angeles (2013) - Professor Rodrigo Tamariz (1 episodes)
- Nightcrawler (2014) - Scrapyard Owner
- "Miller Lite (commercial) Cashier" (2015)
- La Migra (2015) - Uncle Manny Chavez
- Castle (2016) - Jorge 'El Oso' Zamacona (1 episodes)
- Inhumans (2017) - Kitang (3 episodes)
- El Chicano (2018) - Jesus
- Velvet Buzzsaw (2019) - Ray Ruskinspear
- Once Upon a Time in Hollywood (2019) - Bartender
- The Pizza Tip (2021) - Coffee Shop Manager
- The Terminal List (2022) - Marco Del Toro (2 episodes)
- Presumed Innocent (2024) - Bryan Ratzer (3 episodes)
