= Exception (TV series) =

Science fiction horror anime series

- Release poster
- Genre: Science fiction; Horror
- Created by: Hirotaka Adachi
- Written by: Hirotaka Adachi
- Directed by: Yūzō Satō (chief); Chien Yi Lin; Yu Cheng Wang; Mntn Chang; Grace Chen
- Creative director: Tomokazu Osawa
- Voices of: Nolan North; Ali Hillis; Robbie Daymond; Eugene Byrd; Nadine Nicole
- Composer: Ryuichi Sakamoto
- Countries of origin: Japan; Taiwan
- Original language: English
- No. of seasons: 1
- No. of episodes: 8

Production
- Executive producer: Taiki Sakurai
- Producer: Yutaka Omatsu
- Cinematography: Haruhide Ishiguro
- Editor: Yusuke Ueno
- Running time: 24–45 min
- Production companies: Tatsunoko Production; Studio 5inc Bakken Record

Original release
- Network: Netflix
- Release: October 13, 2022

Exception (stylized as e∞ception) is a science fiction horror original net animation (ONA) series based on an original story by Hirotaka Adachi with character designs by Yoshitaka Amano, music by Ryuichi Sakamoto, and directed by Yūzō Satō.

The series was released on Netflix on October 13, 2022.

== Premise ==
Humans are searching a new solar system for potential new planets to terraform after being forced to leave Earth. To explore a potential planet, "Womb", a 3D biological printer creates an exploration team one individual at a time to pilot spacecraft. However, a fatal exception causes one crew member, Lewis, to be misprinted as a deformed monster that could potentially pose a threat to the rest of the crew. A new, successful printing of Lewis joins the crew to help in the situation, which raises philosophical questions of humanity, self, and life.

== Characters ==
Lewis
Voiced by: Chikahiro Kobayashi (Japanese); Nolan North (English)
Nina
Voiced by: Yūko Kaida (Japanese); Ali Hillis (English)
Mack
Voiced by: Takahiro Sakurai (Japanese); Robbie Daymond (English)
Oscar
Voiced by: Takanori Hoshino (Japanese); Eugene Byrd (English)
Patty
Voiced by: Atsumi Tanezaki (Japanese); Nadine Nicole (English)

== Episodes ==
All episodes were written by Hirotaka Adachi and directed by Yūzō Satō with Chien Yi Lin, Yu Cheng Wang, Mntn Chang and Grace Chen as assistant directors.

No.	Title	Storyboards by	Original release date
1	"Misprint"	Field Liu, Ying Chia Chu, Chang Ching Chen	October 13, 2022
2	"Hunger"	Jin Cheng Ye	October 13, 2022
3	"Contact"	Field Liu	October 13, 2022
4	"Collusion"	Field Liu	October 13, 2022
5	"Investigation"	Field Liu, Ying Chia Chu, Chang Ching Chen	October 13, 2022
6	"Betrayal"	Ying Chia Chu	October 13, 2022
7	"Survival"	Field Liu, Ying Chia Chu, Chang Ching Chen	October 13, 2022
8	"Gravitation"	Jia Li Cheng	October 13, 2022

== Production and release ==
Netflix first announced the project as part of their Geeked Week in June 2021. Hirotaka Adachi wrote a new science fiction horror story, and the character designs were done by Yoshitaka Amano, who designs the characters for Final Fantasy games. The series is directed by Yūzō Satō. At the next year's Geeked Week, Netflix released the first look at some of the series art and character designs. A trailer was released in September 2022, revealing that Ryuichi Sakamoto composed the music for the series as well as the main Japanese and English cast members.

The series debuted worldwide on October 13, 2022.

== Reception ==
The art and design for Exception were especially praised thanks to the work of Yoshitaka Amano. The CGI animation itself, however, did receive some criticism for having a low-budget appearance. The story and the music were also spoken highly of.

=== Accolades ===
The episode "Misprint" from Exception was nominated for an Annie Award for Directing in an Animated Television/Broadcast Production in 2023.
