= Naked Boys Singing! =

American Vaudeville-style musical revue

- Book: Robert Schrock
- Premiere: March 28, 1998: Celebration Theatre, California
- Productions: 1999 Off-Broadway

Naked Boys Singing! is a musical revue that features traditional American vaudeville-style music performed by eight actors who sing and dance naked. The campy musical comedy premiered at the Celebration Theatre in West Hollywood, California, on March 28, 1998. The show opened off-Broadway in July 1999, and was subsequently transferred numerous times across New York City. A Las Vegas production at the Erotic Heritage Museum opened in September 2021.

== Productions ==
The show opened off-Broadway at the Actors' Playhouse on July 22, 1999, with book and direction by Robert Schrock, musical direction by Stephen Bates, and choreography by Jeffry Denman, originally produced by Jamie Cesa, Jennifer Dumas, Hugh Hayes, Tom Smedes, and Carl D. White.

The show transferred to Theatre Four in March 2004, and gained attention when producers offered discounts to those attending the 2004 Republican National Convention. The show transferred again in 2005 to New World Stages Stage Four, until closing on January 28, 2012.

Productions of Naked Boys Singing! have been performed throughout the United States, with international shows in Norway, Puerto Rico, Brazil, Japan, Italy, South Africa, and Australia.

Shortly after the original off-Broadway production closed, Producer/Directors Tom and Michael D'Angora decided to transfer their Provincetown adaption of Naked Boys Singing! to the off-Broadway stage, with a revival at Theatre Row's Kirk Theatre on April 5, 2012.

A production at the Erotic Heritage Museum in Las Vegas opened in September 2021.

== Synopsis ==
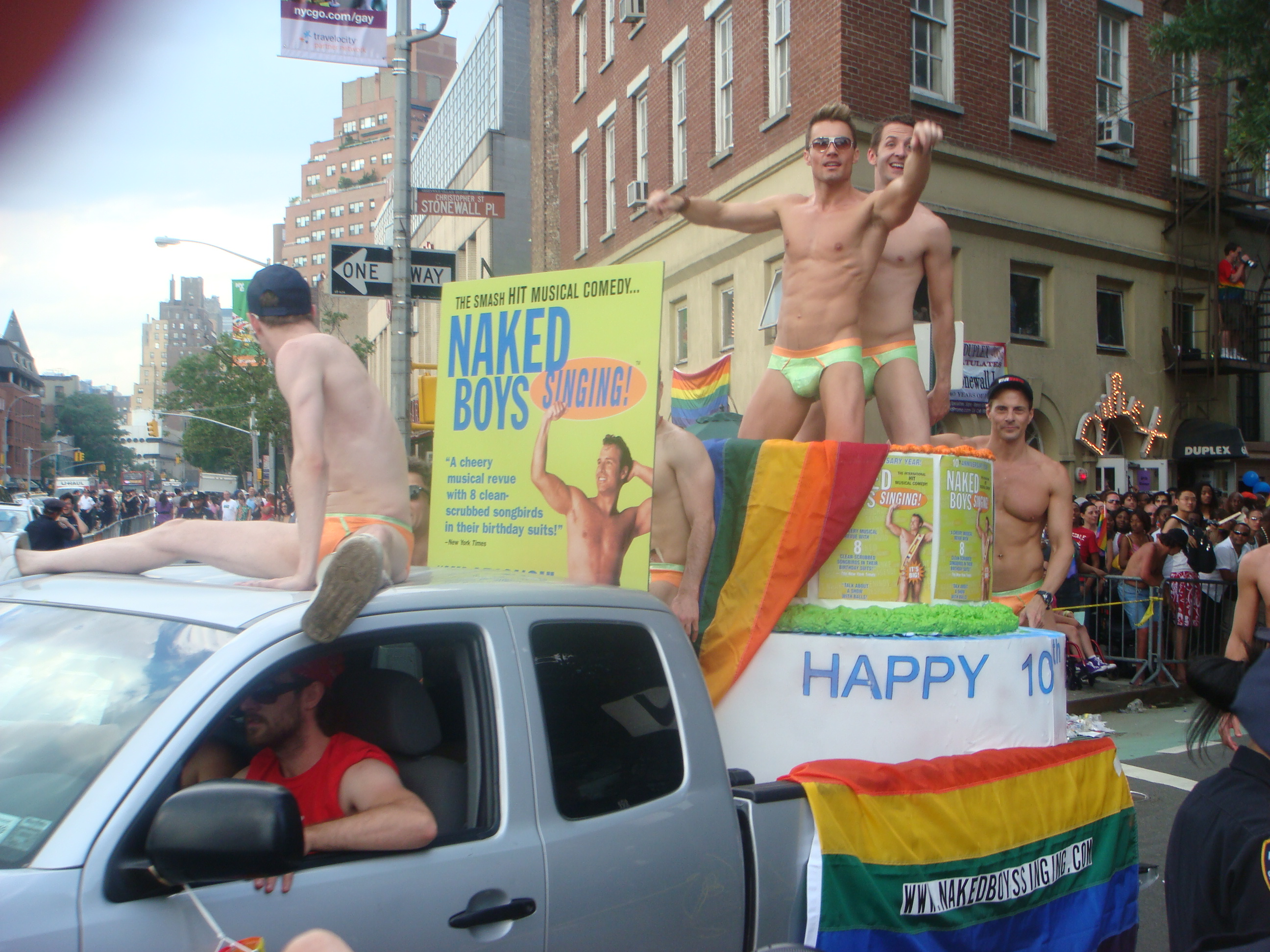
Cast members at New York City Gay Pride Parade, celebrating the show's 10th anniversary.

The show has no plot; it contains 15 songs, about various issues, such as gay life, male nudity, coming out, circumcision and love.

== Musical numbers ==
#	Title
1	"Gratuitous Nudity"
2	"The Naked Maid"
3	"The Bliss of a Bris"
4	"Window to Window"
5	"Fight the Urge"
6	"Robert Mitchum"
7	"Jack's Song (I Beat My Meat)"
8	"Members Only"
9	"Perky Little Porn Star"
10	"Nothin' But the Radio On"
11	"Kris, Look What You've Missed"
12	"Muscle Addiction"
13	"The Entertainer"
14	"Window to Window (reprise)"
15	"Window to the Soul"
16	"Finale"
17	"Naked Boys Singing!"

== Cast ==
Role	Opening night cast	Replacements
Glenn	Glenn Seven Allen	Timothy Connell, Eric Dean Davis, Trevor Richardson
Jon	Jonathan Brody	Richard Lear, Steven Spraragen
Tim	Tim Burke	William DiPaola, Kristopher Kelly, Ryan Lowe
Tom	Tom Gualtieri	Jeffrey Todd
Daniel	Daniel C. Levine	George Livengood
Sean	Sean McNally	Billy Briggs, Robert McGown, John Sechrist, Luis Villabon
Adam	Adam Michaels	Patrick Herwood, Patrick Boyd
Trance	Trance Thompson	Stephen Alexander, Ralph Cole, Jr., Eric Potter, Dennis Stowe

== Awards and nominations ==
- 1998 Back Stage West "Garland Award" for musical score (Stephen Bates, Marie Cain, Shelly Markham, Jim Morgan, David Pevsner, Rayme Sciaroni, Mark Savage, Ben Schaechter, Robert schrock, Mark Winkler and Bruce Vilanch)
- 1998 LA Weekly Theatre Award nomination: Musical of the Year
- 2010 Broadway.com Audience Award nomination: Favorite Long-Running Off-Broadway Show
- 2011 Off-Broadway Alliance nomination: Best Long-Running Show
- 2021 BroadwayWorld winner: Best Las Vegas Musical

== Film adaptation ==
Naked Boys Singing!
- Directed by: Robert Schrock; Troy Christian
- Written by: Bruce Vilanch; Stephen Bates; Marie Cain; Shelly Markham; Jim Morgan; David Pevsner; Ben Schaechter; Robert Schrock; Rayme Sciaroni; Trance Thompson; Mark Winkler
- Produced by: Kirkland Tibbels
- Starring: Kevin Alexander Stea; Joe Souza; Phong Truong; Andrew Blake Ames; Anthony Manough; Salvatore Vassallo; Vincent Zamora; Joseph Keane; Jason Currie; Jaymes Hodges
- Edited by: Troy Christian; Jerry Evans
- Music by: Nic. tenBroek
- Distributed by: TLA Releasing
- Release date: October 2007
- Running time: 95 minutes
- Country: United States
- Language: English

The show was adapted into a film of the same name, released in 2007.

=== Cast and songs ===
- Kevin Alexander Stea – Naked Maid
- Joe Souza – Bliss of a Bris
- Phong Truong (also called Ethan Le Phong) – Window to the Soul
- Jason Currie – Entertainer
- Joseph Keane – Perky Little Porn Star
- Anthony Manough – Muscle Addiction
- Andrew Blake Ames – Jack's Song
- Vincent Zamora – Window to Window
- Jaymes Hodges – Nothin' but the Radio On
- Salvatore Vassallo – Conductor
