= List of The Lair episodes =

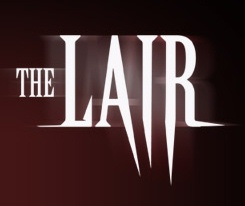
Title card

The Lair is a here! original television series following a coven of vampires who operate a sex club in an island community, the exact location of which is never mentioned.

== Season 1 (2007) ==
No. overall	No. in season	Title	Directed by	Written by	Original release date
1	1	"Episode 1 & 2"	Fred Olen Ray	Fred Olen Ray	August 7, 2007
2	2	"Episode 1 & 2"	Fred Olen Ray	Fred Olen Ray	August 7, 2007
Thom, a reporter for the local paper is locked in a cell. He begins dictating the story into a tape recorder, stating that he has 12 hours before the sun goes down, 12 hours left to live. The remainder of the season is a flashback to the events leading up to the opening scene. A young man named Eric visits the private sex club known as The Lair. He meets Colin, the club manager. They have sex in a back room and Colin, revealing himself to be a vampire, attacks and kills Eric. Damian, the leader of the vampire group, orders Frankie, the club’s janitor and familiar (wannabe-vampire) to dispose of Eric's body. The next day, Sheriff Trout finds the body, the latest in a string of "John Doe murders." Thom meets Frankie, who gives him a necklace Eric had worn. Fellow reporter Laura recognizes the necklace as an amulet from a book detailing myths and legends of the coast. Laura’s boyfriend, Jimmy, resents her taking time with work than with him. Later at home, Thom's jealous boyfriend Jonathan confronts him, then takes the necklace and goes to The Lair in search of Frankie. There Damian attacks Jonathan and leaves him for dead. Jonathan survives the attack and is taken to the hospital, catatonic. Thom and Laura research the history of the Coast further and discuss the possibility of vampires being responsible for the John Doe attacks. At the Lair, Damian works on a portrait of himself which, similar to The Picture of Dorian Gray, he says holds his curse. He and Colin agree to finish off Jonathan. Later, he mystically calls out to Eric, who rises from his table in the morgue.
3	3	"Episode 3"	Fred Olen Ray	Fred Olen Ray	August 29, 2007
Damian introduces the newly risen vampire Eric to the rest of the Lair's "inner circle." Thom tracks Frankie to the club seeking answers about the attack on Jonathan but a terrified Frankie refuses to help. Damien spies Thom's card and telepathically links to him, ordering him to hang himself. Laura intercedes just in time to save Thom. Meanwhile, Damian goes to Jonathan's hospital room to kill him but is interrupted by Thom and Laura. Dr. Belmont and Sheriff Trout, having discovered a stamp on Eric's hand in ultraviolet ink, are startled to discover the same stamp on Jonathan and Thom's hands.
4	4	"Episode 4"	Fred Olen Ray	Fred Olen Ray	September 5, 2007
A shaken Damian confides in Colin that Thom is the reincarnation of Richard DeVere, the vampire who painted the portrait and who transformed Damian. Damian had driven a stake through DeVere's heart and stolen the painting, which now bore the evidence of his evil deed on its face. Meanwhile, Dr. Belmont injects Jonathan with an experimental drug which revives him, but Jonathan is stricken with amnesia. Back at The Lair, Damian mentally entrances Thom and commands him to his side. Also, Colin enlists Frankie in a plot against Damian. Damian, wavering in his belief that Thom is DeVere reincarnated, takes Thom to see the portrait, only to discover it missing.
5	5	"Episode 5"	Fred Olen Ray	Fred Olen Ray	September 12, 2007
As Damian worries about the missing painting, the sheriff arrives at the club and momentarily spots Eric. Sheriff Trout warns Damian that he'll be watching him. At the hospital, the doctors see that Jonathan's neck wound is almost completely healed and they discharge him to Laura. Laura, sporting a black eye from her abusive boyfriend Jimmy, takes him home. Damian gathers the family together and accuses one of them of betrayal, demanding the return of the portrait. Privately, Colin sows seeds of doubt about Eric in Damian's mind. Damian takes Thom to the cell and locks him in, then kills Eric by driving a wooden spear through his heart. Eric's body is disposed of and when it's found again, a perplexed Sheriff Trout starts to work on getting a search warrant for The Lair. Back at Thom and Jonathan's place, Colin mystically entrances Laura and sets her off to kill Jonathan. Jonathan dodges the strike. As Laura pursues him, Jimmy enters looking for her and she stabs and kills Jimmy. Sheriff Trout arrives and arrests her.
6	6	"Episode 6"	Fred Olen Ray	Fred Olen Ray	September 29, 2007
Frankie lures Damian to a store room saying the portrait is there. Colin attacks Damian and seals him behind a brick wall. Colin goes to Thom in his cell and tells him he has twelve hours to live. Sheriff Trout obtains his warrant and he, Jonathan and Deputy Rogers go to search The Lair. Thom concludes his recording and moments later his cell door mysteriously unlocks. He escapes, but not before encountering a vampire. Thom pulls off the vampire's amulet and the vampire disintegrates. Back home, Thom calls Dr. Belmont and learns of Laura's arrest. At The Lair, Sheriff Trout, Jonathan and Rogers split up. Rogers discovers several sleeping vampires, who awaken and attack him. At the jail, Laura tells Thom that Jonathan's gone to The Lair. Thom races over. Colin encounters Jonathan and moments later Trout confronts Colin. Frankie appears and opens fire on the sheriff, who returns fire. Frankie is killed and Trout is gravely wounded. Jonathan grabs a gun and fires on Colin, who, unaffected, vanishes. Thom arrives and spies Trout on the floor. As he tries to help him, Jonathan reveals himself as a vampire and attacks Thom.

== Season 2 (2008) ==
No. overall	No. in season	Title	Directed by	Written by	Original release date
7	1	"Episode 1"	Fred Olen Ray	Fred Olen Ray	September 5, 2008
At The Lair, a deputy questions Colin about the shootout. Colin, disappointed to learn that Sheriff Trout survived, points the finger at Frankie. Thom awakens on his floor at home with two bloody puncture wounds on his throat. He showers and then checks his answering machine, hearing a message from Jonathan telling him that they will never see each other again and urging Thom to leave the island. Laura calls Thom from jail, relieved to learn that he's alive. Colin gathers the coven and tells them that he has taken over as their leader. He orders them not to kill any more men to avoid the police investigating the club. Jonathan learns from Colin that he will be taking Frankie's place as the club's messenger and cleanup person. Elsewhere, Ian, a hitchhiker, catches a ride in a pickup. He has sex with the driver, Riley (Brandon Ruckdashel), in his motel room and later, when Riley is asleep, steals the truck, which soon breaks down. Ian staggers from the truck and falls behind it. A tow truck driver finds the truck and is attacked by Ian, who has transformed into a werewolf.
8	2	"Episode 2"	Fred Olen Ray	Fred Olen Ray	September 19, 2008
Damian projects himself to Thom and confesses his love. They have sex and Thom discovers that his wounds have mysteriously healed. Damian asks for Thom's help in opposing Colin. Thom visits Laura in jail and then calls upon Sheriff Trout, whom he learns has gone temporarily blind after being shot.
9	3	"Episode 3"	Fred Olen Ray	Fred Olen Ray	October 3, 2008
A man arrives from the mainland in search of Ian. Elsewhere, Ian awakens naked in the woods, his hands covered in blood. He stumbles into Sheriff Trout's house and Trout suggests that he stay for a few days. Colin has a vision of Frankie at the Lair. Botanist Jake Waldman receives a mysterious flower, the Lumina Orchis. The man who delivers it, Spivey, discovers a gold coin entangled in its roots.
10	4	"Episode 4"	Fred Olen Ray	Fred Olen Ray	October 17, 2008
Colin has another vision of Frankie but believes Damian is projecting it. Ian transforms again and kills a neighbor and his dog. Dr. Waldman becomes ever more obsessed with the flower. The next day, Thom's ex-boyfriend Richie and Thom discuss his research on the origins of the Lair. The mysterious mainlander continues his pursuit of Ian. Trout discovers Ian in the bath, but can't see that the water is stained with blood. That night, Dr. Waldman and Tim go out for drinks and Tim expresses his unease about the flower. As Colin seeks a victim outside the Lair, Thom breaks in. Frankie leads him to the wall which conceals Damian. He breaks through, finding a desiccated body.
11	5	"Episode 5"	Fred Olen Ray	Fred Olen Ray	October 31, 2008
As Thom retrieves Damian's body, he sees a vision of Frankie. He also sees Jonathan having sex with and then claiming a victim. Sheriff Trout again tries to get Ian to open up but Ian refuses. Ian later transforms once again under the full moon. Tim puts Jake to bed and they kiss. Spivey returns in search of more coins. He finds one but the flower kills him with a blast of fungus spores to his face. Jake and Tim dump the body along the side of a road. Thom returns home with the body. Damian manifests again, telling Thom he needs blood. In exchange for Thom's blood, Damian agrees to get Laura released from jail. Thom cuts his chest and drips his blood on Damian's body, which begins to regenerate.
12	6	"Episode 6"	Fred Olen Ray	Fred Olen Ray	November 14, 2008
Damian regenerates. He feeds on Thom and then Thom feeds on him; they kiss. A partially sighted Sheriff Trout returns to patrol. He inspects Spivey's body. Thom stops by Trout's house and meets Ian. Thom calls the sheriff and asks for his help with Laura and the Lair. Laura has a hearing. The judge releases on her own recognizance because Jimmy's body is missing from the morgue. Richie drives her to Thom's place, but Thom, busy covering his windows with dark plastic, is short with her and she leaves. Inside, Damian warns Thom to keep Richie away. Ian meets Tim at a bar and they strike up an acquaintanceship. Tim tells him about the flower. Ian gives Tim a ride home and the mysterious mainlander tracks Ian's car electronically. Jake spots Ian and Tim together and fumes. Frankie's ghost confronts Colin and forces him to admit that he buried Frankie alive. Frankie shows him that Damian is gone and warns Colin that in two days Colin will be destroyed.
13	7	"Episode 7"	Fred Olen Ray	Fred Olen Ray	November 28, 2008
Colin encounters Frankie's ghost in a bar and Frankie tells him that only Colin's total destruction will free him. Colin then goes to the newspaper office looking for Thom. He finds Richie and feeds on him. Jake and Tim make love but later, under the influence of the plant, Jake strikes Tim across the face. Jonathan comes to Thom's house intending to transform him into a vampire but Damian, fresh from feeding, destroys him. The mysterious mainlander shoots at Ian in wolf form, wounding him. The next morning, he encounters Sheriff Trout and warns him that Ian is dangerous. Tim finds Ian in Jake's greenhouse.
14	8	"Episode 8"	Fred Olen Ray	Fred Olen Ray	December 12, 2008
Tim cleans Ian's superficial wound and alerts Trout to Ian's location. Laura tells Thom that Richie is missing and that she's leaving the island. Before she can, Colin attacks her. Richie shows up at Thom's with a bite mark on his neck and induces Thom to go to the Lair after Laura. Jake knocks Tim unconscious and takes the plant out into the night. Sheriff Trout discovers Tim but Ian is nowhere to be found. Trout and Tim go to the greenhouse and discover the plant is missing. Ian comes into the greenhouse. Trout shines the artificial moon lamp on him, triggering his transformation.
15	9	"Episode 9"	Fred Olen Ray	Fred Olen Ray	December 26, 2008
The transformed Ian flees into the night. Trout and Tim head out in pursuit. Thom returns to the Lair where he encounters Frankie. Frankie encourages Thom to take Damian's portrait but warns him that because Damian mixed their blood destroying the portrait may destroy Thom as well. Thom discovers Laura's body in the bar and Colin tempts him with immortality in exchange for dosing Damian with an eternal sleeping potion. Jake takes the plant to a field where he encounters the mysterious Mainlander, lying in wait for Ian. Damian arrives at the Lair and retrieves the painting, hurling a spike into Colin but missing his heart. The pair struggles with Colin taking the upper hand until Thom plunges the spike through Colin's heart. Damian bites Thom. Ian enters the clearing, where the mysterious mainlander reveals that Ian killed the man's brother and his best friend. Ian mauls Jake and the plant sprays spores on the mainlander, killing him. Trout shoots Ian, who attacks him momentarily before running away. The next morning, Riley discovers the wounded Ian and takes him for help.

The Lair

== Season 3 (2009) ==
No. overall	No. in season	Title	Directed by	Written by	Original release date
16	1	"Episode 1"	Fred Olen Ray	Fred Olen Ray	September 4, 2009
Richie, now doing Frankie's old job at the Lair, finds Colin's amulet on the floor. He sweeps up Colin's ashes and stores them under his bed. Six months later, Thom struggles as the only human in the Lair and with his role as Damian's only blood supply. Damian suggests an "open relationship" but Thom refuses. Sheriff Trout, missing Ian (who has fled the island suspected of murder), revisits old memories of another young man. He responds to a knock at his door but no one is there. Tim invites Athan, an antiquities researcher newly arrived on the island, to rent Jake's old house (left to Tim). A local picks up Athan later and, after they have sex, Athan transforms into a male gorgon and turns his trick to stone.Damian and Richie secure Damian's portrait in a storeroom. A disused phone in the room rings. Richie answers and states that it's Colin, and he is returning.
17	2	"Episode 2"	Fred Olen Ray	Fred Olen Ray	September 11, 2009
The sheriff learns from the coroner that the "statue" has human internal structures. An online search leads him to the myth of Medusa and the gorgons but he dismisses the idea. Later, Trout remembers his young friend and hears another knock at the door but again finds no one there. Thom discovers Damian with another man and breaks off their relationship. Damian instructs Frankie to keep an eye on him. Instead, Frankie tells Thom about a new book of island lore that discusses a ring that protects the wearer from all magic. At The Lair, a man named Tad approaches Damian on behalf of the reclusive Frau von Hess, stating she has plans for the island and wants to work with Damian. Richie receives more calls from Colin and he and a vampire perform a blood ritual with his ashes. Colin is restored.
18	3	"Episode 3"	Fred Olen Ray	Fred Olen Ray	September 18, 2009
Thom's search for the ring takes him to the local bookstore where he meets Harris, author of the book Frankie spoke of. Colin takes a job as a bouncer at the Harbor Lights bar. Athan is intrigued by Tim's tattoos, and later goes to The Lair, where he turns another man to stone. Sheriff Trout learns that the statue's fingerprints match the missing man's.
19	4	"Episode 4"	Fred Olen Ray	Fred Olen Ray	September 25, 2009
Thom meets again with Harris. He learns more about the ring and the two become intimate. Colin formulates a plan to take over the Harbor Light bar. Athan sees his possession by the gorgon in a nightmare. Deputy Miller informs the sheriff that a former island resident named Marcus Stiles — who is apparently connected to the young man in Trout's memories — has been taken into custody; the sheriff hears another mysterious knock with no one there. Thom arrives home to find Richie who, distraught, puts a gun to his own head and pulls the trigger.
20	5	"Episode 5"	Fred Olen Ray	Fred Olen Ray	October 2, 2009
Richie's gunshot wound is not fatal; Thom rushes him to the hospital, and he survives, but the doctor insists on keeping him there for extended observation. Tad returns with a detailed proposal; Damian seems interested but also takes an interest in feeding off of Tad. Athan is accused by a Harbor Lights patron of being behind the disappearance of Charlie, the missing man. Colin intervenes, kicking out the accuser, but Athan follows him out to the cab and takes off his glasses, turning the man to stone as the cab driver takes him away.
21	6	"Episode 6"	Fred Olen Ray	Fred Olen Ray	October 9, 2009
Harris catches Thom breaking into his house for the map leading to the location of the Ring of Erebus and the head of Carter Vane. He declines to call the authorities and simply tells Thom to leave. Matty, the owner of Harbor Lights, uncovers the paper trail that highlights the money Colin is embezzling from the books but decides it is his long-time bartender who is doing the embezzling and fires him, ridding Colin of another rival for control. Damian visits Thom, hoping for another chance with him, but Thom again rejects him. Thom then decides that night to dig up the Ring of Erebus, and finds it — and the head of Carter Vane.
22	7	"Episode 7"	Fred Olen Ray	Fred Olen Ray	October 16, 2009
One of Colin's underlings is caught by Damian trying to steal his clientele away from the Lair. Damian has one of his own men expose him as a vampire, and later follows him to Harbor Lights, where he spies on Colin and then kills another of Colin's crowd, leaving his calling crowd so Colin knows exactly who did it. Thom takes the ring—and Carter Vane's head—home. When he gets there, he finds Harris, who confronts him, believing he broke into a local museum and stealing documents related to both, and warns him against keeping the head. Thom admits to having the ring and shows it to Harris, but denies having the head and informs him that he wasn't the one who committed the break-in. Meanwhile, Tim finds the diary of Carter Vane in Athan's room, but Athan, who actually broke into the museum, lies to Tim about it, claiming he got it on a loan from Harris. Sheriff Trout confronts the imprisoned Stiles, who denies murdering Dennis. Frankie echoes Harris' sentiments to Thom and advises him to get rid of Vane's head. Later Thom wakes up from a nightmare involving the head to find that the head has moved from where he swore it was last before he dozed off.
23	8	"Episode 8"	Fred Olen Ray	Fred Olen Ray	October 23, 2009
Colin and Gary discover the body. Matty also sees it but Colin assures him he will handle it. The county prosecutor informs Sheriff Trout that without new evidence he will have to drop the murder charge against Stiles. Frankie advises Thom to lock Vane's head away. Athan confronts Harris, demanding the head. Harris agrees to help him find it. Damian arrives at the home of Frau von Hess expecting a business meeting, only to be taken prisoner.
24	9	"Episode 9"	Fred Olen Ray	Fred Olen Ray	October 30, 2009
Damian is tortured by Frau von Hess's henchmen but she refuses to tell him why she is holding him. Thom contemplates wishing on Vane's head to restore Damien's mortality. Later he visits Richie in the hospital. He agrees to help Richie escape but warns him he can never speak of The Lair. Colin completes his takeover of the Harbor Light from an enthralled Matty. Tim prepares a romantic dinner for Athan as an apology for suspecting him of the museum theft. They make love and Athan describes his curse. Tim is incredulous but agrees to help find the head. Extradition papers for Marcus Stiles arrive. Sheriff Trout decides to confront Stiles one last time. Before he reaches the cell, a mysterious figure murders Stiles, leaving his hanged body to be found by the Sheriff.
25	10	"Episode 10"	Fred Olen Ray	Fred Olen Ray	November 6, 2009
The prosecutor suspends Sheriff Trout pending an investigation into Stiles's death. Thom returns to The Lair and learns Damian is missing. Returning home, he is confronted by Athan who demands Carter Vane's head. The ring protects Thom from the gorgon. Thom goes to Harris to retrieve the head. Growing impatient, Thom goes to the back of Harris's shop to find that the head has killed him. Frankie finds Damian and convinces him to accept mortality. In Damian's absence, Colin dispatches Gary to lure away the patrons of The Lair.
26	11	"Episode 11"	Fred Olen Ray	Fred Olen Ray	November 13, 2009
Sheriff Trout is cleared of Stiles's murder and returns to duty. Thom returns home with Vane's head. Damian tries to persuade Tad to free him. Instead, Tad exposes him to sunlight but Thom wishes him mortal at the same moment. Damien sets the house on fire and reunites with Thom. Tad tells Frau von Hess of Damien's escape and she dispatches him to see if Damien has discovered a cure for vampirism. Athan and Tim call upon the Oracle of Delphi to find Carter Vane's head but the Oracle rejects them. Richie leaves the hospital rather than undergo hypnosis. Colin spots Damian on television and he and Gary plot to kill Damian and Thom.
27	12	"Episode 12"	Fred Olen Ray	Fred Olen Ray	November 20, 2009
Thom and Damian share an intimate night together before Damian returns to The Lair to hide his cursed painting, protecting it with crosses. Athan plots to obtain Carter Vane's head over Tim's objections. Later, learning from the Sheriff of the stone bodies, Tim begins to suspect Athan may be telling the truth about his curse. Colin recruits the rest of Damian's patrons to the Harbor Lights. Someone removes Damian's painting from The Lair.
28	13	"Episode 13"	Fred Olen Ray	Fred Olen Ray	November 27, 2009
Damian and Thom make preparations to leave the island as Colin and Gary plan their deaths. Frau von Hess also plots against Damian. Sheriff Trout is attacked by the young man he once knew, now a vampire. Colin finds Richie outside Thom's home, takes the portrait and kills Richie. Colin shoots Thom and Damian hurls a sharpened cross at Colin. Colin teleports away and the cross pierces Damian's portrait. Athan and Tim arrive. Athan offers to save Thom's life in exchange for Carter Vane's head. Damian agrees and Athan uses his blood to heal Thom's wounds. Athan and Tim depart with the head and Thom's wish is reversed. Thom is healed but Damian is bleeding from a wound corresponding to the damage to the portrait. And Damian is blood-linked to Thom, Colin and all the other vampires sired. So the story behind the portrait was true.
