= Brian Nolan =

American actor and producer (born 1979)

- Born: November 28, 1979 (age 46); Orlando, Florida
- Education: BFA in Performance (Archived at the University of Central Florida
- Years active: 2000–present
- Known for: Frankie in The Lair

Brian Nolan (born November 28, 1979) is an American actor and producer, best known for starring as Frankie on all current seasons of Here! TV’s The Lair and as a producer on the Netflix films Secret Obsession The Merry Gentlemen and Fatal Affair.

As an actor, Nolan has appeared on the Disney Channel's Hannah Montana, Nickelodeon’s iCarly, and in numerous television movies and independent films.

Nolan has been a producer on over 80 made-for-television films.

Raised in Lake Mary, Florida, he attended Lake Mary High School. He is a graduate of the University of Central Florida, where he majored in theater.
