= Scrooge & Marley (2012 film) =

2012 film by Richard Knight Jr. and Peter Neville

- Theatrical release poster
- Directed by: Richard Knight Jr. Peter Neville
- Screenplay by: Richard Knight Jr. Timothy Imse; Ellen Stoneking
- Based on: A Christmas Carol by Charles Dickens
- Produced by: Tracy Baim; David Strzepek
- Starring: David Pevsner; Tim Kazurinsky; Rusty Schwimmer; Bruce Vilanch; Megan Cavanagh; Ronnie Kroell; David Moretti
- Cinematography: Andrew Parotte
- Music by: Lisa McQueen
- Production company: Sam I Am Films
- Release date: November 21, 2012
- Running time: 93 minutes
- Country: United States
- Language: English

Scrooge & Marley is 2012 film adaptation of Charles Dickens' 1843 novella A Christmas Carol, which is retold from a gay perspective, co-directed by Richard Knight Jr. and Peter Neville, and co-written by Knight, Ellen Stoneking, and Timothy Imse. It also features David Pevsner as Ebenezer "Ben" Scrooge, Tim Kazurinsky as the ghost of Scrooge's business partner Jacob Marley, Ronnie Kroell as the Ghost of Christmas Past, Megan Cavanagh as the Ghost of Christmas Present, David Moretti as Bob Cratchit, and JoJo Baby as the Ghost of Christmas Future. The film adaptation received a mixed critical reception.

== Plot ==
A gay successful piano bar owner Ebenezer "Ben" Scrooge (David Pevsner) despises Christmas and other people; he also mistreats and underpays his employees. One night, Scrooge encounters the ghost of Jacob Marley (Tim Kazurinsky)—who died ten years before the film—in chains, warning him that Scrooge would have the same fate in afterlife as Marley's and that the three Spirits will visit him.

After he goes to sleep, Scrooge encounters the Ghost of Christmas Past (Ronnie Kroell), who transports him to the 1970s. There, they see Ben's father (Michael Joseph Mitchell) kicking Young Ben (Drew Anderson) out of the house after seeing Ben make love to one of his male classmates. Four months later, Young Ben befriends a young disco club employee Jacob Marley (Nicholas Bailey) and is hired by the club owner Fezziwig (Bruce Vilanch), who treats him like a son. Young Ben develops a relationship with Bill (Christopher Allen), whom he met at Fezziwig's club. On Ben and Bill's first Christmas season together, Ben's close sister Franny (Allison Torem) dies after giving birth to her daughter Freda. Then Ben's father sends him a letter instructing him not to visit or honor the family, distressing Ben. For comfort, Ben and Bill declare their love for each other. Over the years, Ben, Jacob and Fezziwig become co-owners of the club and expand their business; however, Ben and Bill's relationship becomes strained when Ben increasingly focuses more on his career and money and neglects Bill. In the mid-1980s, Ben and Jacob trick Fezziwig into transferring his business to them and then kick Fezziwig out. Outraged about Fezziwig's fate and having enough, Bill ends the relationship with Ben, upsetting Ben. Eventually, Bill dies of AIDS in 1987, yet Ben refuses to visit him when Bill was dying or to mourn him.

After Ben finishes revisiting the past, the Ghost of Christmas Present (Megan Cavanaugh) transports him to his niece Freda's (Rusty Schwimmer) house, where she and her partner Mary (Amy Matheny) gather a Christmas Eve party, and then various places where other people celebrate the holidays, including a scene where Fezziwig solitarily celebrates Christmas in his apartment. Then they transport to the house of one of Scrooge's overworked and underpaid employees Bob Cratchit (David Moretti), whose health care proposal for employees Scrooge refused, where Bob lives with his male partner and their adopted children, including an ill child Tiny Tim (Liam Jones). After they transport back to Scrooge's home, feeling sympathy, Scrooge asks about Tiny Tim's fate. She replies, "We all will die. Nothing can be done without assistance."

Then the Ghost of Christmas Future (JoJo Baby) covered in a black robe transports him to a bleak future Christmas, where everyone is glad about his death, a gay center whose donation offer Scrooge refused earlier is financially struggling and close to shutting down, and his possessions are stolen and then sold to pawn shops. Then the spirit transports Scrooge to the Cratchit home, where the family mourns Tiny Tim's death, and then to the scene of Scrooge's death and his tombstone inscribed: "E. Scrooge".

Then Scrooge sobs and promises that he will change while he is transported back to his home on the present Christmas Day. Happy to return, Scrooge remembers putting away Bill's letter, written on the day of their breakup, and then reads it, saying that when Ben finds grace, Bill forgives him and declares his love for him. On the afternoon, Scrooge anonymously sends a large turkey to the Cratchit home for Christmas dinner, donates money to the gay center, spends a Christmas dinner with Freda and Mary, gives his employees bonuses, promotes Bob as a business partner, gives Bob a pay raise, and accepts Bob's health care proposal. Some time later, Scrooge honors his deceased lover Bill, takes care of Fezziwig with a motorized wheelchair, is a dedicated uncle to Freda and Mary's baby, becomes Tiny Tim's father figure, and starts another relationship, illustrating his kept promise to the Spirits. After the end credits roll, the chains loosen from Marley's ghost resulting from visiting and haunting Scrooge, i.e. helping others to help oneself, a loophole that he learned at the beginning of the film.

== Production ==
The filming occurred in Chicago in May 2012. Man's Country bathhouse was used to portray the disco club.

The film was partially crowdfunded through an Indiegogo campaign, which ended on August 15 of the same year. One of Chicago's film critics Richard Knight Jr. and Peter Neville co-directed the film adaptation. Neville was also the film editor. Ellen Stoneking, Knight and Timothy Imse co-wrote the screenplay. Tracy Baim and David Strzepek were the executive producers. Andrew Parrotte was the cinematographer. Lisa McQueen composed the film score and co-wrote most of the songs with Knight. Veteran actress Judith Light narrates the film. Co-writer Timothy Imse died on August 11, 2011, months before the filming started. The film is dedicated to Imse.

Co-writer Richard Knight Jr. was inspired by watching a gay couple in a 2005 film The Family Stone for an idea of creating a gay-themed holiday film, which later evolved into adapting Dickens's A Christmas Carol and retelling it in a modern gay perspective. Knight noted that, while the LGBT community historically not having "fair representation in films and television" made some filmmakers reluctant to include a "gay villain", the film crew decided to have a gay portrayal of "blackhearted" Ebenezer Scrooge, who Knight said "actually redeems himself in this film [and is] a good guy in our story" whose background and history are explained in the film.

Actor Bruce Vilanch, who portrayed Fezziwig, said, "Fezziwig is the end of that party that was going on in the gay community in the '70s, that was ended by the AIDS epidemic."

== Release ==
The film had a limited theatrical release and had independent distribution. It ran at Laemmle Theatres' Playhouse 7 at Pasadena, California on November 21–27, 2012 and had its official premiere at Chicago's historical Music Box Theatre on November 29 and played there until December 6. An engagement at Chicago's Gene Siskel Film Center followed in late December 2012. The film was released on home video and streaming simultaneously, along with the soundtrack. The film also played other theatrical dates around the US in cities ranging from Seattle, San Francisco to Palm Springs.

== Reception ==
The film adaptation received mixed reviews. Frank Schneck of The Hollywood Reporter said the film is "campy" and caters to "niche audience", despite the film being advertised as "A Holiday Movie for All of Us". Schneck further noted "amateurish filmmaking and overly broad performances." Dennis Harvey of Variety considered it a "niche" intended for gay audience who "enjoys watered-down camp and syrupy empowerment messages, which are not to be confused with the good kinds of either." Harvey also called the songs "weak", found the film's production values "charmlessly obvious with tacky f/x and stagy interiors," and criticized the film's use of "frequent blackouts to transition between scenes in a mediocre tech/design package." Film critic Roger Ebert rated it two and a half stars out of four. Mark Olsen of Los Angeles Times found the film "earnest, well-intentioned and not unpleasant, but seems almost entirely pre-programmed." Countess Gregula of a blogging site ChicagoNow deemed the story "faithful to the Dickens classic, but with a gay-friendly twist."

== Soundtrack ==
Names of songwriters are taken from the ending credits.

No.	Title	Writer(s)	Performer(s)	Length
1.	"Opening Titles"		Scrooge & Marley Orchestra	0:24
2.	"All Year Long"	Amber deLaurentis and Tom Cleary	Amber deLaurentis	3:12
3.	"Welcome to Christmas Present"	Lisa McQueen, Ellen Stoneking, and Richard Knight Jr.	Megan Cavanagh	1:59
4.	"Christmas Eve Is Coming Soon"	Richard Knight Jr.	Becca Kaufman	4:12
5.	"I'm a Christmas Kinda Baby"	Lisa McQueen and Richard Knight Jr.	Rusty Schwimmer	3:01
6.	"Star of Wonder"	Terre Roche	Matt Alber	3:19
7.	"O Christmas Tree"	Traditional	The Plush Interiors	2:34
8.	"Christmas Time"	John Syzmanski	John Syzmanski	1:43
9.	"A Very Crawford Christmas"	David Cerda and Taylor E. Ross	The Joans	2:38
10.	"Dreidel Jingle Fiasco"	Traditional	BETTY	1:24
11.	"Jingle Bells"	Traditional	Samba Bamba	2:41
12.	"Christmas Eve Is Coming Soon"	Richard Knight Jr.	Lisa McQueen (Becca Kaufman in the film)	2:10
13.	"Just a Little Bit of Christmas"	Rebecca Jean Tanner	Jeannie Tanner Trio	2:31
14.	"Ebenezer Scrooge Was to Christmas"	Lisa McQueen and Richard Knight Jr.	The Show Biz Kids	2:08
15.	"Ebenezer Scrooge Is to Christmas"	McQueen and Knight	David Pevsner and The Show Biz Kids	1:49
16.	"O Tannenbaum"	Traditional	The Chicago Gay Men's Chorus	0:42
17.	"Coventry Carol"	Traditional	Kirsten Gustafson and Dave Zegner	2:08
18.	"One Kiss for Christmas"	Linda Good	Jen Zias	4:04
19.	"Amazing"	Marsha Malamet, Liz Vidal, and Stephan Oberhoff	Jason Gould	4:12
20.	"Scrooge & Marley Score Suite"		Scrooge & Marley Orchestra	10:46

== See also ==
- List of Christmas films
- Adaptations of A Christmas Carol
