= Masked Singer România =

Romanian reality singing competition television series

- Genre: Reality competition
- Based on: King of Mask Singer by Munhwa Broadcasting Corporation
- Presented by: Jorge; Pavel Bartoș
- Starring: Horia Brenciu; Alex Bogdan; INNA; Mihaela Rădulescu; Codin Maticiuc; Ana Morodan
- Opening theme: Who Are You
- Country of origin: Romania
- Original language: Romanian
- No. of seasons: 2
- No. of episodes: 21

Production
- Running time: 41–85 minutes

Original release
- Network: Pro TV
- Release: 11 September 2020 – 9 December 2021

Masked Singer România is a Romanian reality singing competition television series that premiered on 11 September 2020 on Pro TV. It is the Romanian adaptation of King of Mask Singer and shows celebrities singing covers of famous songs while wearing head-to-toe costumes and face masks that hide their identities. The show was presented by Jorge in the first season and the judging panel consisted of singer-entertainer Horia Brenciu, top-charting singer-songwriter INNA, film producer and writer Codin Maticiuc and online celebrity Ana Morodan.

In April 2021, the show was renewed for a second season. It was also announced that Pavel Bartoș would take over the hosting duties from the first season's previous host, Jorge. The panel was also changed with singer-entertainer Horia Brenciu and singer-songwriter INNA staying fully with actor Alex Bogdan and businesswoman Mihaela Rădulescu joining in.

== Cast ==
=== Panelists ===
Panelist	Season	
Panelist	1	2
Horia Brenciu	Main	
INNA	Main	
Codin Maticiuc	Main	
Ana Morodan	Main	
Alex Bogdan		Main
Mihaela Rădulescu		Main

=== Host ===
Host	Season	
Host	1	2
Jorge	Main	
Pavel Bartoș		Main

== Series overview ==
Series overview
Series	Celebrities	Episodes	Originally released		Winner	Runner-up	Third place	Fourth place
Series	Celebrities	Episodes	First released	Last released	Winner	Runner-up	Third place	Fourth place
1	12	8	11 September 2020	30 October 2020	Mugur Mihăescu as "Corbul"	Irina Rimes as "Căpcăunul"	Karmen as "Leoaică"	Mircea Radu as "Panda"
2	19	13	9 September 2021	9 December 2021	Andreea Marin as "Muma Pădurii”	Nadine as "Fluturele"	Theo Rose as "Albina"	Cabral Ibacka as "Șaorma"

== Season 1 ==
=== Celebrities ===
Stage name	Celebrity	Occupation	Episodes								
Stage name	Celebrity	Occupation	1	2	3	4	5	6	7	8	
Stage name	Celebrity	Occupation	1	2	3	4	5	6	7	A	B
Corbul	Mugur Mihăescu	Actor		WIN		SAFE	SAFE	SAFE	SAFE	SAFE	WINNER
Căpcăunul	Irina Rimes	Singer		WIN		SAFE	SAFE	SAFE	SAFE	SAFE	RUNNER-UP
Leoaică	Karmen	Singer		WIN		SAFE	SAFE	SAFE	SAFE	THIRD	
Panda	Mircea Radu	TV Host	WIN		SAFE		SAFE	SAFE	SAFE	OUT	
Vulpoiul	Costi Ioniță	Singer	RISK		SAFE		SAFE	SAFE	OUT		
Iepurele	Alexandra Stan	Singer		RISK		SAFE	SAFE	OUT			
Tigrul	Feihong Basigu	Musician	WIN		SAFE		OUT				
Unicornul	Elena Băsescu	Politician	RISK		SAFE		OUT				
Monstrul	Florin Piersic Jr.	Actor		RISK		OUT					
Îngerul	Brigitte Pastramă	Model	WIN		OUT						
Vampirul	Damian Drăghici	Singer		OUT							
Extraterestrul	Sandra Izbașa	Gymnast	OUT								

The masked singer won their face-off and remained in the competition.
The masked singer was safe from elimination.
The masked singer lost their face-off and was in the bottom three/two, but was not eliminated.
The masked singer was eliminated from the competition and unmasked upon their elimination.
The masked singer did not perform.

=== Week 1 (11 September) ===
Performances on the first episode
#	Stage name	Song	Identity	Result
1	Unicorn	"Diamonds" by Rihanna	undisclosed	RISK
2	Tiger	"Dragostea Din Tei" by O-Zone	undisclosed	WIN
3	Angel	"Frozen" by Madonna	undisclosed	WIN
4	Alien	"Mr. Saxobeat" by Alexandra Stan	Sandra Izbașa	OUT
5	Fox	"Sex on Fire" by Kings of Leon	undisclosed	RISK
6	Panda	"Trika Trika" by Faydee	undisclosed	WIN

=== Week 2 (18 September) ===
Performances on the second episode
#	Stage name	Song	Identity	Result
1	Ogre	"A Little Party Never Killed Nobody" by Fergie	undisclosed	WIN
2	Monster	"What a Wonderful World" by Louis Armstrong	undisclosed	RISK
3	Raven	"Don't Stop Me Now" by Queen	undisclosed	WIN
4	Rabbit	"Dance Monkey" by Tones and I	undisclosed	RISK
5	Vampire	"Vals" by Smiley	Damian Drăghici	OUT
6	Lion	"Crazy in Love" by Beyoncé	undisclosed	WIN

=== Week 3 (25 September) ===
Performances on the third episode
#	Stage name	Song	Identity	Result
1	Angel	"Zig-Zagga" by Loredana Groza	Brigitte Pastramă	OUT
2	Panda	"Human" by Rag'n'Bone Man	undisclosed	SAFE
3	Unicorn	"Hung Up" by Madonna	undisclosed	SAFE
4	Tiger	"Old Town Road" by Lil Nas X and Billy Ray Cyrus	undisclosed	SAFE
5	Fox	"Stay" by Rihanna feat. Mikky Ekko	undisclosed	SAFE

=== Week 4 (2 October) ===
Performances on the fourth episode
#	Stage name	Song	Identity	Result
1	Rabbit	"Only Girl (In the World)" by Rihanna	undisclosed	SAFE
2	Raven	"Bella ciao" by Goran Bregović	undisclosed	SAFE
3	Monster	"Kiss" by Art of Noise feat. Tom Jones	Florin Piersic Jr.	OUT
4	Lion	"I Love Rock 'n' Roll" by Joan Jett and the Blackhearts	undisclosed	SAFE
5	Ogre	"Mai frumoasă" by Laura Stoica	undisclosed	SAFE

=== Week 5 (9 October) ===
Performances on the fifth episode
#	Stage name	Song	Identity	Result
1	Ogre	"Iguana" by INNA	undisclosed	SAFE
2	Unicorn	"Visele" by Irina Rimes	Elena Băsescu	OUT
3	Fox	"We Will Rock You" by Queen	undisclosed	SAFE
4	Raven	"Just a Gigolo/I Ain't Got Nobody" by Louis Prima	undisclosed	SAFE
5	Tiger	"Gangnam Style" by Psy	Feihong Basigu	OUT
6	Rabbit	"Wrecking Ball" by Miley Cyrus	undisclosed	SAFE
7	Panda	"Strangelove" by Depeche Mode	undisclosed	SAFE
8	Lion	"Hotline Bling" by Drake	undisclosed	SAFE

=== Week 6 (16 October) ===
Performances on the sixth episode
#	Stage name	Song	Identity	Result
1	Panda	"One Way or Another (Teenage Kicks)" by One Direction	undisclosed	SAFE
2	Lion	"Oficial Îmi Merge Bine" by Simplu	undisclosed	SAFE
3	Fox	"All of Me" by John Legend	undisclosed	SAFE
4	Rabbit	"Sweet but Psycho" by Ava Max	Alexandra Stan	OUT
5	Raven	"Livin' la Vida Loca" by Ricky Martin	undisclosed	SAFE
6	Ogre	"Whenever, Wherever" by Shakira	undisclosed	SAFE

=== Week 7 (23 October) - Semi-final ===
Performances on the seventh episode
#	Stage name	Song	Identity	Result
1	Lion	"Wild Thoughts" by DJ Khaled feat. Rihanna & Bryson Tiller	undisclosed	SAFE
2	Fox	"Loco Contigo" by DJ Snake, J Balvin & Tyga	Costi Ioniță	OUT
3	Raven	"Fireball" by Pitbull feat. John Ryan	undisclosed	SAFE
4	Panda	"Perfect fără tine" by Vama	undisclosed	SAFE
5	Ogre	"Sunny" by Boney M.	undisclosed	SAFE

=== Week 8 (30 October) - Final ===
==== Round One ====
Performances on the eighth episode – round one
#	Stage name	Song	Identity	Result
1	Ogre	"Can't Stop the Feeling!" by Justin Timberlake	undisclosed	SAFE
2	Raven	"Let Me Entertain You" by Robbie Williams	undisclosed	SAFE
3	Lion	"Bang Bang" by Jessie J, Ariana Grande & Nicki Minaj	Karmen	THIRD
4	Panda	"Uptown Funk" by Mark Ronson feat. Bruno Mars	Mircea Radu	OUT

==== Round Two ====
Performances on the eighth episode – round two
#	Stage name	Song	Identity	Result
1	Ogre	"Set Fire to the Rain" by Adele	Irina Rimes	RUNNER-UP
2	Raven	"The Greatest Show" by Hugh Jackman	Mugur Mihăescu	WINNER

== Season 2 ==
=== Celebrities ===
Stage name	Celebrity	Occupation	Episodes													
Stage name	Celebrity	Occupation	1	2	3	4	5	6	7	8	9	10	11	12	13	
Stage name	Celebrity	Occupation	1	2	3	4	5	6	7	8	9	10	11	12	A	B
Muma Pădurii	Andreea Marin	TV Presenter	WIN		SAFE		SAFE		SAFE	SAFE	SAFE	SAFE	RISK	SAFE	SAFE	WINNER
Fluturele	Nadine	Singer	RISK		SAFE			SAFE	SAFE	SAFE	SAFE	SAFE	SAFE	RISK	SAFE	RUNNER-UP
Albina	Theo Rose	Singer	WIN		SAFE			SAFE	SAFE	SAFE	SAFE	SAFE	SAFE	SAFE	THIRD	
Șaorma	Cabral Ibacka	TV Personality	WIN		SAFE		SAFE		SAFE	RISK	SAFE	SAFE	SAFE	SAFE	OUT	
Păunul (WC)	Jorge	Singer									SAFE	RISK	SAFE	OUT		
Lady Panda (WC)	Alina Eremia	Singer					SAFE		SAFE	SAFE	SAFE	SAFE	OUT			
Dragonii	Mihai Rait	Actor		WIN		SAFE		SAFE	SAFE	SAFE	SAFE	OUT				
Dragonii	Ecaterina Ladin	Actress		WIN		SAFE		SAFE	SAFE	SAFE	SAFE	OUT				
Pinguinul	Viorica Manole	Singer		WIN		SAFE	SAFE		SAFE	SAFE	OUT					
Papagalul	Alex Velea	Singer	RISK		SAFE		SAFE		SAFE	OUT						
Monstrulica (WC)	Oana Zăvoranu	Actress						SAFE	OUT							
Pisica	Antonia	Singer		RISK		SAFE		SAFE	OUT							
Steaua	Mihai Trăistariu	Singer		RISK		SAFE		OUT								
Gheisa	Cleopatra Stratan	Singer		WIN		SAFE	OUT									
Robotul	Marian Drăgulescu	Gymnast		WIN		OUT										
Șarpele	Radu Vâlcan	Actor		RISK		OUT										
Cameleonul	Cătălin Zmărăndescu	Kickboxer	WIN		OUT											
Pufosul	Corina Caragea	TV Host	RISK		OUT											
Emoji	Carla's Dreams	Singer		OUT												
Bufnița	Ilie Năstase	Tennis player	WD (Note: Năstase, after completing his performance and letting the panel give their guesses, complained about how hot it was in the costume and then proceeded to unmask himself which thereby caused him to be eliminated from the competition after doing so.)													

The masked singer won their face-off and remained in the competition.
The masked singer was safe from elimination.
The masked singer lost their face-off and was in the bottom three/two, but was not eliminated.
The masked singer was eliminated from the competition and unmasked upon their elimination.
The masked singer did not perform.
The masked singer unmasked themselves and left the competition.

=== Week 1 (9 September) ===
Performances on the first episode
#	Stage name	Song	Identity	Result
1	Mother of the Forest	"Bunica bate toba" by Zdob şi Zdub	undisclosed	WIN
2	Butterfly	"Rise Like a Phoenix" by Conchita Wurst	undisclosed	RISK
3	Fluffy	"Big Big World" by Emilia Rydberg	undisclosed	RISK
4	Shawarma	"Kiss Kiss"by Tarkan/"Constantine" by Mateo	undisclosed	WIN
5	Bee	"Alive" by Sia	undisclosed	WIN
6	Parrot	"Ayy Macarena" by Tyga	undisclosed	RISK
7	Chameleon	"I'm Too Sexy" by Right Said Fred	undisclosed	WIN
8	Owl	"My Way" by Frank Sinatra	Ilie Năstase	WD

=== Week 2 (16 September) ===
Performances on the second episode
#	Stage name	Song	Identity	Result
1	Cat	"Toxic" by Britney Spears	undisclosed	RISK
2	Dragons	"Say Something" by A Great Big World and Christina Aguilera	undisclosed	WIN
2	Dragons	"Say Something" by A Great Big World and Christina Aguilera	undisclosed	WIN
3	Geisha	"Toy" by Netta Barzilai	undisclosed	WIN
4	Star	"Bring Me to Life" by Evanescence	undisclosed	RISK
5	Penguin	"Despablito" by Delia Matache	undisclosed	WIN
6	Emoji	"I Want It That Way" by Backstreet Boys	Carla's Dreams	OUT
7	Robot	"Panamera" by Lino Golden	undisclosed	WIN
8	Serpent	"Cancion Del Mariachi" by Antonio Banderas	undisclosed	RISK

=== Week 3 (23 September) ===
Performances on the third episode
#	Stage name	Song	Identity	Result
1	Mother of the Forest	"Let's Get Loud" by Jennifer Lopez	undisclosed	SAFE
2	Fluffy	"Savage Love" by Jason Derulo	Corina Caragea	OUT
3	Parrot	"Smells Like Teen Spirit" by Nirvana	undisclosed	SAFE
4	Butterfly	"Single Ladies (Put a Ring on It)" by Beyoncé	undisclosed	SAFE
5	Chameleon	"Basul Și Cu Toba Mare" by Vița de Vie	Cătălin Zmărăndescu	OUT
6	Bee	"Born This Way" by Lady Gaga	undisclosed	SAFE
7	Shawarma	"Liberă La Mare" by André	undisclosed	SAFE

=== Week 4 (30 September) ===
Performances on the fourth episode
#	Stage name	Song	Identity	Result
1	Cat	"Feeling Good" by Michael Bublé	undisclosed	SAFE
2	Penguin	"Make You Feel My Love" by Adele	undisclosed	SAFE
3	Geisha	"Ce-ți cântă dragostea" by Roxen	undisclosed	SAFE
4	Serpent	"The Business" by Tiësto	Radu Vâlcan	OUT
5	Dragons	"Señorita" by Shawn Mendes and Camila Cabello	undisclosed	SAFE
5	Dragons	"Señorita" by Shawn Mendes and Camila Cabello	undisclosed	SAFE
6	Star	"Bad Guy" by Billie Eilish	undisclosed	SAFE
7	Robot	"Tot Mai Sus" by Guess Who ft. Marius Moga	Marian Drăgulescu	OUT

=== Week 5 (7 October) ===
Performances on the fifth episode
#	Stage name	Song	Identity	Result
1	Shawarma	"Walk This Way" by Run-DMC/"Lala Song" by Bob Sinclair	undisclosed	SAFE
2	Penguin	"Apa" by Loredana	undisclosed	SAFE
3	Mother of the Forest	"Firestarter" by The Prodigy	undisclosed	SAFE
4	Parrot	"Kiss from a Rose" by Seal	undisclosed	SAFE
5	Geisha	"Nas Ne Dogonyat" by t.A.T.u.	Cleopatra Stratan	OUT
Wildcard	Lady Panda	"New Rules" by Dua Lipa	undisclosed	SAFE

=== Week 6 (14 October) ===
Performances on the sixth episode
#	Stage name	Song	Identity	Result
1	Star	"Can't Get You Out of My Head" by Kylie Minogue	Mihai Trăistariu	OUT
2	Dragons	"Fara Tine" by Pepe and Miki	undisclosed	SAFE
2	Dragons	"Fara Tine" by Pepe and Miki	undisclosed	SAFE
3	Bee	"1234 (Unde Dragoste Nu E)" by Delia	undisclosed	SAFE
4	Butterfly	"Vogue" by Madonna	undisclosed	SAFE
5	Cat	"I Like It" by Cardi B, Bad Bunny, and J Balvin	undisclosed	SAFE
Wildcard	Lady Monster	"Finesse" by Bruno Mars feat. Cardi B	undisclosed	SAFE

=== Week 7 (21 October) ===
Performances on the seventh episode
#	Stage name	Song	Identity	Result
1	Bee	"Zitti e buoni" by Måneskin	undisclosed	SAFE
2	Cat	"Un-Break My Heart" by Toni Braxton	Antonia	OUT
3	Dragons	"Tupeu De Borfaș" by La Familia	undisclosed	SAFE
3	Dragons	"Tupeu De Borfaș" by La Familia	undisclosed	SAFE
4	Penguin	"Shallow" by Bradley Cooper and Lady Gaga	undisclosed	SAFE
5	Shawarma	"Jerusalema" by Master KG feat. Nomcebo	undisclosed	SAFE
6	Mother of the Forest	"Don't Cha" by The Pussycat Dolls feat. Busta Rhymes	undisclosed	SAFE
7	Parrot	"I Like to Move It" by Reel 2 Real feat. The Mad Stuntman	undisclosed	SAFE
8	Butterfly	"Mariola" by Minelli	undisclosed	SAFE
9	Lady Monster	"Biniditat" by Skizzo Skillz feat. Karie	Oana Zăvoranu	OUT
10	Lady Panda	"California Dreamin'" by The Mamas & the Papas	undisclosed	SAFE

=== Week 8 (28 October) ===
Performances on the eighth episode
#	Stage name	Song	Identity	Result
1	Parrot	"Bad" by Michael Jackson	Alex Velea	OUT
2	Lady Panda	"Taki Taki" by DJ Snake feat. Selena Gomez, Ozuna and Cardi B	undisclosed	SAFE
3	Butterfly	"Poate eu, Poate tu" by Narcisa Suciu	undisclosed	SAFE
4	Bee	"Raise Your Glass" by Pink	undisclosed	SAFE
5	Mother of the Forest	"All That Jazz" from Chicago	undisclosed	SAFE
6	Dragons	"Runnin' (Lose It All)" by Naughty Boy feat. Beyoncé and Arrow Benjamin	undisclosed	SAFE
6	Dragons	"Runnin' (Lose It All)" by Naughty Boy feat. Beyoncé and Arrow Benjamin	undisclosed	SAFE
7	Penguin	"Selecta" by Anda Adam	undisclosed	SAFE
8	Shawarma	"Stay With Me" by Sam Smith	undisclosed	RISK

=== Week 9 (4 November) ===
Performances on the ninth episode
#	Stage name	Song	Identity	Result
Wildcard	Peacock	"SexyBack" by Justin Timberlake	undisclosed	SAFE
2	Dragons	"Strazile din Bucuresti" by Florian Rus feat. Mira	undisclosed	SAFE
3	Lady Panda	"Bitch Better Have My Money" by Rihanna	undisclosed	SAFE
4	Mother of the Forest	"Ma Doare La Bass" by Marius Moga feat Shift and What Up	undisclosed	SAFE
5	Bee	"Fallin'" by Alicia Keys	undisclosed	SAFE
6	Shawarma	"Seven Nation Army" by The White Stripes	undisclosed	SAFE
7	Butterfly	"Flashbacks" by INNA	undisclosed	SAFE
8	Penguin	"Perfect" by Ed Sheeran	Viorica Manole	OUT

=== Week 10 (18 November) ===
Performances on the tenth episode
#	Stage name	Song	Identity	Result
1	Shawarma	"Pump It" by Black Eyed Peas	undisclosed	SAFE
2	Lady Panda	"Someone You Loved" by Lewis Capaldi	undisclosed	SAFE
3	Dragons	"Pa' Ti" by Jennifer Lopez & Maluma	Mihai Rait	OUT
3	Dragons	"Pa' Ti" by Jennifer Lopez & Maluma	Ecaterina Ladin	OUT
4	Butterfly	"Man in the Mirror" by Michael Jackson	undisclosed	SAFE
5	Peacock	"Toată Lumea Dansează" by Fuego	undisclosed	RISK
6	Mother of the Forest	"Eroina" by Carla's Dreams	undisclosed	SAFE
7	Bee	"Dangerous Woman" by Ariana Grande	undisclosed	SAFE

=== Week 11 (24 November) ===
Performances on the eleventh episode
#	Stage name	Song	Identity	Result
1	Mother of the Forest	"Mamasita" by Narcotic Sound & Christian D	undisclosed	RISK
2	Butterfly	"Cheap Thrills" by Sia	undisclosed	SAFE
3	Peacock	"Adidasii" by Șatra B.E.N.Z ft. Damia	undisclosed	SAFE
4	Bee	"Once Upon a December" from Anastasia	undisclosed	SAFE
5	Lady Panda	"Beggin'" by Måneskin	Alina Eremia	OUT
6	Shawarma	"Jealous" by Labrinth	undisclosed	SAFE

=== Week 12 (2 December) - Semi-final ===
Performances on the twelfth episode
#	Stage name	Song	Result	
1	Peacock	"Mundian To Bach Ke" by Panjabi MC	RISK	
2	Bee	"Work" by Rihanna	SAFE	
3	Shawarma	"Somewhere Over the Rainbow" by Israel Kamakawiwoʻole	SAFE	
4	Butterfly	"Don't Start Now" by Dua Lipa	RISK	
5	Mother of the Forest	"Iubirea Schimbă Tot" by Andra	SAFE	
Sing-off details			Identity	Result
1	Peacock	"Bambolina" by Killa Fonic ft. Carla's Dreams	Jorge	OUT
2	Butterfly	"Say My Name" by Destiny's Child	undisclosed	SAFE

=== Week 13 (9 December) - Final ===
- Group Performance: "Let's Get It Started" by Black Eyed Peas

==== Round One ====
Performances on the thirteenth episode – round one
#	Stage name	Song	Identity	Result
1	Butterfly	"Love Me Again" by John Newman	undisclosed	SAFE
2	Shawarma	"Moves Like Jagger" by Maroon 5 feat. Christina Aguilera	Cabral Ibacka	OUT
3	Mother of the Forest	"Manele" by Spike	undisclosed	SAFE
4	Bee	"Just Dance" by Lady Gaga	Theo Rose	THIRD

==== Round Two ====
Performances on the thirteenth episode – round two
#	Stage name	Song	Identity	Result
1	Butterfly	"Skyfall" by Adele	Nadine	RUNNER-UP
2	Mother of the Forest	"Trandafir De La Moldova" by Loredana Groza	Andreea Marin	WINNER
