= Daytime Emmy Award for Outstanding Special Class Special =

Annual television award

The Daytime Emmy Award for Outstanding Special Class Special is an Emmy Awards given to "single original program." Fiction, non-fiction, music, and variety events are all eligible for this single category. Categories similar to this have been awarded since the Daytime Emmys early years.

== Winners and nominees ==
Winners in bold

=== Outstanding Special Class Special ===
==== 2000's ====
2000

- **Macy's Thanksgiving Day Parade** (NBC)
- Film Preservation Classics with Billy Bob Thornton (AMC)
- World Aids Day '99 (MTV)
- Great Performances ("From Vienna: The New Year's Celebration 1999") (PBS)
- MTV Uncensored (MTV)

2001

- **Reel Models: The First Women of Film** (AMC)
- L
- Macy's Thanksgiving Day Parade (NBC)
- Against All Odds: AMC's Tribute to Hollywood's Disabled (AMC)
- Film Preservation Classics with Jodie Foster (AMC)
- MTV Movie Awards (MTV)

2002

- **Beyond Tara: The Extraordinary Life of Hattie McDaniel** (AMC)
- Macy's Thanksgiving Day Parade (NBC)
- A Prayer for America: Yankee Stadium Memorial (SYN)
- Call to Action: An Untold Story of 9/11 (AMC)
- Live from Lincoln Center ("The Chamber Music Society of Lincoln Center: An Evening of Beethoven") (PBS)

2003

- **Hollywood Rocks the Movies** ("The 1970s") (AMC)
- Tournament of Roses Parade
- Macy's Thanksgiving Day Parade (NBC)
- Behind the Scenes of This Old House (PBS)
- Opening Ceremony Salt Lake Paralympic Winter Games (NBC)

2004

- **Macy's Thanksgiving Day Parade** (NBC)
- Tournament of Roses Parade (SYN)
- 9/11 Memorial from Ground Zero (SYN)
- The Another World Reunion (SOAPnet)
- Live from Lincoln Center ("The Complete Brandenburg Concertos") (PBS)

2005

- **9/11 Memorial from Ground Zero** (SYN)
- The Brady Bunch 35th Anniversary Reunion Special: Still Brady After All These Years (TV Land)
- An Evening with Scott Hamilton & Friends (NBC)
- Macy's Thanksgiving Day Parade (NBC)
- Walt Disney World Christmas Day Parade (ABC)

2006

- **Walt Disney World Christmas Day Parade** (ABC)
- Tournament of Roses Parade
- Macy's Thanksgiving Day Parade (NBC)
- 9/11 Memorial from Ground Zero (SYN)
- SOAPnet Reveals ABC Soap Secrets (SOAPnet)

2007

- **A Question of Life or Meth** (A&E)
- Tournament of Roses Parade
- 9/11 Memorial from Ground Zero (SYN)
- Macy's Thanksgiving Day Parade (NBC)
- Walt Disney World Christmas Day Parade (ABC)

2008

- **America's Invisible Children: The Homeless Education Crisis in America** (CW)
- Legally Blonde: The Musical (MTV)
- Macy's Thanksgiving Day Parade (NBC)
- Walt Disney World Christmas Day Parade (ABC)
- Who's Who of World Giving (CW)

2009

- **Macy's Thanksgiving Day Parade** (NBC)
- Clean House ("The Messiest Home In The Country") (Style)
- 11th Annual Ribbon of Hope Celebration (Here TV)
- Life on the Edge: A Global Crisis (FOX Reality)
- Walt Disney World Christmas Day Parade (ABC)

==== 2010's ====
2010

- **Clean House** ("The Messiest Home In The Country") (Style)
- On the Edge: The Poverty Crisis in Africa (FOX Reality)
- We Are One: The Obama Inaugural Celebration at the Lincoln Memorial (HBO)

2011

- **New Orleans: Getting Back to Normal** (APT)
- mtvU's Stand In with John Legend (MTVU)
- Macy's Thanksgiving Day Parade (NBC)
- Private Sessions ("Sting at Red Rocks") (A&E)
- The Rally to Restore Sanity and/or Fear (Comedy Central)

2012

- **Style Exposed** ("Baring It All") (Style)
- 30 Years From Here (Here TV)
- Thanksgiving Live! (Food Network)
- The Joni Show ("Holocaust: From Horror to Hope") (Daystar)
- Style Exposed ("Sperm Donor") (Style)
- President Obama’s 2011 Race To The Top Commencement Challenge (MTV 2)

2013

- **Guy Fieri's Family Reunion** (Food Network)
- Macy's Thanksgiving Day Parade (NBC)
- Giada at Home ("The Royal Treatment") (Food Network)

2014

- **The Young and the Restless** ("Jeanne Cooper Tribute") (CBS)
- A World of Dreams: Voices From the OUT100 (Here TV)
- Disney Parks Christmas Day Parade (ABC)
- mun2 News Special ("Hecho en America") (mun2)

2015

- **Laverne Cox Presents: The T Word** (MTV)
- E! Breaking News: Joan Rivers (E! Entertainment)
- Taco Trip (Cooking)
- Thanksgiving at Bobby’s (Food Network)

2016

- **Matt Shepard Is a Friend of Mine** (Logo)
- 30th Independent Spirit Awards (IFC)
- Barefoot in L.A. (Food Network)
- R.L. Stine's Monsterville: Cabinet of Souls (Netflix)
- White People (MTV)

2017

- **Out of Iraq** (Logo)
- MTV Docs ("Transformation") (MTV)
- Bookaboo ("Bookaboo's Barkin' New Year's Eve") (Amazon)
- The Wildlife Docs ("Africa") (ABC)
- Disney Parks Magical Christmas Celebration (ABC)

2018

- **Kevyn Aucoin: Beauty & the Beast in Me** (Logo)
- Macy's Thanksgiving Day Parade (NBC)
- An American Girl Story ("Ivy & Julie 1976: A Happy Balance") (Amazon)
- Bean (Fuse)
- I’m With The Banned (VICELAND)
- Skyward (Amazon)

2019

- **Quiet Heroes** (Logo)
- Light in the Water (Logo)
- A Long Road to Freedom: The Advocate Celebrates 50 Years (Here TV)
- Macy's Thanksgiving Day Parade (NBC)
- Super Soul Sunday ("Oprah's Book Club: Freedom After 30 Years on Death Row") (OWN)

==== 2020's ====
2020

- **Sesame Street's 50th Anniversary Celebration** (HBO)
- Hate Among Us (Popstar TV)
- Macy's Thanksgiving Day Parade (NBC)
- This Old House ("40th Anniversary Special") (PBS)
- The Young and the Restless ("Kristoff St. John Tribute") (CBS)

2021

- **Space Launch Live: America Returns to Space** (Discovery and Science Channel)
- 94th Annual Macy’s Thanksgiving Day Parade (NBC)
- 2020 Film Independent Spirit Awards (IFC)
- David Blaine Ascension (YouTube Originals)
- Jeopardy! The Greatest of All Time (Syndicated)
