= Oblivion 2: Backlash =

- Home video cover art
- Directed by: Sam Irvin
- Screenplay by: Peter David
- Story by: Charles Band; Mark Goldstein; John Rheaume; Greg Suddeth
- Produced by: Oana Paunescu; Vlad Paunescu
- Starring: Richard Joseph Paul; Andrew Divoff; George Takei; Julie Newmar; Isaac Hayes; Musetta Vander; Meg Foster
- Cinematography: Adolfo Bartoli
- Edited by: Andy Horvitch
- Music by: Pino Donaggio
- Production company: Full Moon Entertainment
- Distributed by: Full Moon Entertainment; The Kushner-Locke Company
- Release date: April 2, 1996
- Running time: 83 minutes
- Country: United States
- Language: English

Oblivion 2: Backlash (also released as Backlash: Oblivion 2) is a 1996 American direct-to-video space Western film directed by Sam Irvin, written by Peter David, from a story by Charles Band, Mark Goldstein, John Rheaume and Greg Suddeth. Produced by Full Moon Entertainment. It was shot in Romania and is a sequel to the 1994 film Oblivion.

The first film's cast (Richard Joseph Paul, Andrew Divoff, George Takei, Julie Newmar, Isaac Hayes, Musetta Vander and Meg Foster) reprise their roles, with Maxwell Caulfield as a new antagonist.

== Synopsis ==
The film begins shortly after the events of the first film. The setting is the alien-western world of Oblivion.

A bounty hunter named Sweeney arrives to arrest the seductive outlaw Lash on multiple charges, including murder. Sweeney is the deadliest bounty hunter in the universe, and despite appearing as an English dandy, is something far more sinister.

Lash, who just "inherited" a mine of Derconium (the most valuable mineral in the universe) from Crowley in a game of cards, meets up with Red Eye's brother, Jaggar.

Sheriff Zack had killed Red Eye in a duel in the previous film. Jaggar wants the mine for himself and use its ore to rule the galaxy.

Miss Kitty, owner of the local bar/cathouse, reveals to Zack that she is a wanted woman.

A fight develops over Lash between the sheriff of Oblivion (Zack), Jaggar, and Sweeney. In the resulting battle, Miss Kitty is apparently killed. With Jaggar defeated, Sweeney departs.

Miss Kitty, alive, makes an appearance at her own funeral.

== Cast ==
- Richard Joseph Paul as Zack Stone
- Andrew Divoff as Jaggar / Einstein
- George Takei as Doc Valentine
- Julie Newmar as Miss Kitty / Ariel Gwen Shana
- Isaac Hayes as Buster
- Musetta Vander as Lash
- Meg Foster as Stell Barr
- Maxwell Caulfield as Sweeney
- Jackie Swanson as Mattie Chase
- Carel Struycken as Mr. Gaunt
- Jimmie F. Skaggs as Buteo
- Irwin Keyes as Bork
- Nadine Voindrouh as Josephine
- Sam Irvin as Joe "Stogie Joe"

== Production ==
Principal photography took place in Romania back-to-back with the first film.

Newmar stated in Starlog that she liked the story and the character, and drew on her experience of running a real estate agency in her portrayal of Miss Kitty.

== Reception ==
TV Guide gave the film two out of five stars, liking the cast but finding they had little to work with. Entertainment Weekly found the film "nerd-fun" and complimented the in-jokes, but commented that the film was padded and that the sex scene was unnecessary. Creature Feature preferred the first movie.

The movie was released digitally in March 2018 by movie mocking website RiffTrax.com featuring a humorous commentary by comedians Michael J. Nelson, Kevin Murphy, and Bill Corbett.
