= Gaydar (film) =

- Gaydar film poster
- Directed by: Larry LaFond
- Written by: Larry LaFond; Terry Ray
- Produced by: Camela Coggins; Bobby Gibis; Larry LaFond; Mark Mervis; Terry Ray; Terry Ray
- Starring: Terry Ray; Bryan Dattilo; Jennifer Echols; Jim J. Bullock; Charles Nelson Reilly
- Cinematography: Mark Mervis
- Edited by: Bobby Gibis
- Music by: John Boswell
- Release date: October 12, 2002 (Austin Film Festival)
- Running time: 20 minutes
- Country: United States
- Language: English

Gaydar is a 2002 American short comedy film directed by Larry LaFond, written by LaFond and Terry Ray. The film stars Ray, Bryan Dattilo (from Days of Our Lives), Jennifer Echols, and Jim J. Bullock, and features Charles Nelson Reilly in his last film appearance.

== Production ==
Gaydar was filmed in West Hollywood, California.

== Plot ==
Randy has a crush on a fellow office worker, Jack. Randy's friend from the next booth over, Frankalina also has a big crush on Jack, but does not know whether he's gay or straight. Randy comes across a "GAYDAR gun" at a yard sale put on by former partner of Maurice which might just put an end to this mystery.

== Cast ==
- Terry Ray as Randy
- Bryan Dattilo as Jack
- Jennifer Echols as Frankalina
- Jim J. Bullock as Maurice's Ex
- Charles Nelson Reilly as Uncle Vincent
- Thomas Cagle as Dewayne
- Rachel Winfree as Mary Kay

== Reception ==
The film has "appeared in over 120 film festivals around the world and won numerous awards."

== Awards and nominations ==
- 2003, won Grand Jury Award for 'Best Narrative Short Comedy' at Bare Bones International Film Festival
- 2003, won Best Short Comedy Film' at Cinequest San Jose Film Festival
- 2003, won 'Bronze Plaque Award'for Entertainment' at Columbus International Film & Video Festival
