= The Mole (American TV series) season 1 =

The Mole
- Season 1
- Region 1 DVD cover
- Presented by: Anderson Cooper
- No. of contestants: 10
- Winner: Steven Cowles
- Runner-up: Jim Morrison
- Location: California; France; Monaco; Spain
- The Mole: Kathryn Price
- No. of episodes: 9

Release
- Original network: ABC
- Original release: January 9 – February 28, 2001

Season chronology
- Next → Season 2

The first season of The Mole aired on ABC in 2001. It was produced by Stone Stanley Entertainment and was released to DVD by Eagle Rock Entertainment on March 8, 2005. The season was hosted by news reporter Anderson Cooper and featured American contestants; it was filmed mainly in France, Monaco, and Spain. Adapting the format of Belgian reality game show De Mol (The Mole), many challenges and locations were inspired by their counterparts from De Mol's second season in Spain.

== Show details ==
Airdates

- January 9, 2001 – February 28, 2001

Locations

- California, United States (Mojave Desert)
- France (Paris, Cannes)
- Monaco (Monte Carlo)
- Spain (Seville, Jerez)

Rules summary

- Ten players, all strangers. Nine contestants, and one "Mole" (whose identity is kept secret from all the other players and the viewing audience).
- The players participate in various tests (games, physical challenges, puzzles, etc.) to try to earn money to a cash pot, up to a maximum of $1,000,000. The mole's duty is to sabotage the games, and prevent money from being added to the pot, while avoiding, or deflecting suspicion.
- Each episode, the players take a 20-question quiz about the identity of the mole. The player who answers the fewest questions correctly (or in case of a tie, finishes the test the slowest), is "executed" and must leave the game immediately.
- Each episode, one player is executed; the game continues until only three players remain. Two contestants, and the mole. The contestant who scores the highest on the final quiz wins the game, and the entire accumulated cash pot.

Details
Casting for the first season of The Mole was held in late August 2000. Filming was done over 28 days from September 22-October 19, 2000. In late December 2000, ABC announced the contestants. The ten players and 176 crew members traveled to 34 cities in four countries, and stayed at 65 hotels.

Unlike other similar reality shows, contestants on The Mole were ordinarily treated to full course dinners, sit-down breakfasts, and fine wines at supper, while staying some nights at fancy hotels in exotic locations. Often travel was done in nice cars, or comfortable trains. It contrasted sharply with other reality shows of the time, such as Survivor, that saw players in wilderness locations eating meager meals. However, as part of the gameplay, some night stays were less comfortable.

GSN acquired the rights to the program in early 2004. Season 1 was shown in its entirety at varying timeslots. However, after low ratings and changes at the network, it was pulled. In March 2005, the entire season 1 was released on DVD by Eagle Vision USA. In the summer of 2007, Fox Reality acquired the rights to all four Mole seasons, and showed season one the first week of July. It was aired again as a marathon on January 20, 2008. Another marathon of the show was broadcast on June 1, 2008. Netflix began airing seasons 1 and 2 in June 2021.

== Contestants ==
Player	Age	Hometown	Occupation	Finish
Steven Cowles	30	Denver, Colorado	Undercover cop	The Winner
Kathryn Price	28	Chicago, Illinois	Law school lecturer	The Mole
Jim Morrison	29	Newton, New Jersey	Helicopter pilot, lawyer	The Runner Up
Charlie McGowan	63	New York City, New York	Retired police detective	7th executed
Kathleen "Kate" Pahls	55	Cincinnati, Ohio	Real estate investor	6th executed
Jennifer Biondi	35	San Jose, California	Communications manager	5th executed
Henry Wintz	23	Miami, Florida	Bartender	4th executed
Wendi Wendt	29	Cedar Rapids, Iowa	Visual display artist	3rd executed
Afi Ekulona	23	Colorado Springs, Colorado	Medical school applicant	2nd executed
Manuel Herrera	42	Oxnard, California	Events coordinator	1st executed

† Charlie died on April 30, 2018, at the age of 81.

== Execution chart ==
Color key:

Winner
The Mole
Runner-up
Earned or claimed exemption
Executed

	Episode 1	Episode 2	Episode 3	Episode 4	Episode 5	Episode 6	Episode 7	Episode 9 Final
Quiz	1	2	3	4	5	6	7	8
Starting value	$0	$115,000	$135,000	$250,000	$310,000	$370,000	$410,000	$490,000
Money earned	$125,000	$20,000	$115,000	$60,000	$60,000	$60,000	$80,000	$20,000
Penalties	-$10,000	(none)				-$20,000	(none)	
Total value	$115,000	$135,000	$250,000	$310,000	$370,000	$410,000	$490,000	$510,000
Steven	Safe	Safe	Safe	Safe	Safe	Safe	Exempt	Winner (Episode 9)
Kathryn	Safe	Safe	Safe	Safe	Safe	Safe	Safe	The Mole (Episode 9)
Jim	Safe	Safe	Safe	Safe	Safe	Safe	Safe	Runner-up (Episode 9)
Charlie	Safe	Safe	Safe	Safe	Safe	Safe	Executed	Executed (Episode 7)
Kate	Safe	Safe	Exempt	Safe	Safe	Executed	Executed (Episode 6)	
Jennifer	Safe	Safe	Safe	Safe	Executed	Executed (Episode 5)		
Henry	Safe	Safe	Safe	Executed	Executed (Episode 4)			
Wendi	Safe	Safe	Executed	Executed (Episode 3)				
Afi	Safe	Executed	Executed (Episode 2)					
Manuel	Executed	Executed (Episode 1)						
Exemptions	(none)		Kate	(none)			Steven	(none)
Executed	Manuel; Lowest score	Afi; Lowest score	Wendy; Lowest score	Henry; Lowest score	Jennifer; Lowest score	Kate; Lowest score	Charlie; Lowest score	Kathryn; The Mole
Executed	Manuel; Lowest score	Afi; Lowest score	Wendy; Lowest score	Henry; Lowest score	Jennifer; Lowest score	Kate; Lowest score	Charlie; Lowest score	Jim; 13 correct answers
Executed	Manuel; Lowest score	Afi; Lowest score	Wendy; Lowest score	Henry; Lowest score	Jennifer; Lowest score	Kate; Lowest score	Charlie; Lowest score	Steven; 16 correct answers

== Episodes ==
Episode	Airdate	Amount in Pot (Note: Pot earnings: indicates an increase indicates no change indicates a decrease)	Location	Days	Eliminated	
1	January 9, 2001	$0 → $115,000	Mojave Desert.,California, USA & Paris, France	1-3	Manuel	
2	January 16, 2001	$115,000 → $135,000	Monte Carlo, Monaco, Cannes & Crest, France	4-6	Afi	
3	January 23, 2001	$135,000 → $250,000	Medina-Sidonia & Seville, Spain	7-9	Wendi	
4	January 30, 2001	$250,000 → $310,000	Seville, Spain	10-12	Henry	
5	January 6, 2001	$310,000 → $370,000	Paterna de Rivera, El Puerto de Santa María, Jerez, Spain	13-15	Jennifer	
6	January 13, 2001	$370,000 → $410,000	San Lúcar & Jerez, Spain	16-18	Kate	
7	February 20, 2001	$410,000 → $490,000	Montejaque & Ronda, Spain	19-21	Charlie	
Finale	February 27, 2001 & March 6, 2001	$490,000 → $510,000	Montejaque & Ronda, Spain	22-24	Runner-Up	Jim
Finale	February 27, 2001 & March 6, 2001	$490,000 → $510,000	Montejaque & Ronda, Spain	22-24	Winner	Steven
Finale	February 27, 2001 & March 6, 2001	$490,000 → $510,000	Montejaque & Ronda, Spain	22-24	The Mole	Kathryn

=== Episode 1 ===
Episode 1 recapOriginal airdate: January 9, 2001Location: California, USA & Paris, France
Mission	Money earned	Possible earnings
Skydiving	$75,000	$75,000
Night out in Paris	$0	$0
ATM	$50,000	$50,000
1 penalty incurred	−$15,000	
Current Pot	$115,000	$125,000

Execution
Manuel	1st player executed

Skydiving: All ten players arrived at a remote location in the California Mojave Desert. Two helicopters took them to a landing strip where they boarded a plane to skydive from 10,000 feet. If all ten players agreed to skydive tandem, the group pot would earn $75,000. If any one player chose not to jump, no money would be added to the pot. According to clues in episode 8, this test marked the first time the players met, and occurred on September 22, 2000. The players were successful, and earned the full value.

Night out in Paris: The players were flown to Paris, France for their next test. After dinner, the players were allowed to spend the night out in Paris, with a catch - the entire group must stay together, and had to be back to the hotel before midnight (approximately two hours). If the team was not back in time, a $10,000 penalty would be assessed from the pot. The players were successful, and no money was deducted. However, during the test, Manuel insisted on purposely failing the test to spend more time out in Paris. His decision was unanimously overruled.

ATM: The players are shown ten screens which display personal information about their fellow competitors. Two players with the best memories are then chosen from the group. The two have to solve puzzles using the information from the screens to come up with a 4-digit ATM PIN. The PIN is then used to withdraw ₣500 at an ATM somewhere in the town of Draguigan, France. If the team is successful, $50,000 is added to the pot.

Penalty: The remaining players wait during ATM test, and are told not to discuss the information from the screens. Although the players succeeded at the ATM test, Wendi became angry at Charlie and asked how many times his heart has been broken (he is one of two contestants, the other being Kate, to never have had their heart broken), which he responded to. The players were fined $10,000.

- At the elimination, Anderson entered the player's names in alphabetical order. After green screens appeared for Afi, Charlie, Henry, Jim, Jennifer, Kate and Kathryn, the screen turned red when Manuel's name was typed in. Kathryn said she felt sad for Manuel and Kate said she expected to be eliminated first. He thought either Charlie, Jim, Kathryn or Steven (who would become the final four) was the mole.

=== Episode 2 ===
Episode 2 recapOriginal airdate: January 16, 2001Location: Monte Carlo, Monaco & Cannes & Crest, France
Mission	Money earned	Possible earnings
Hostage Rescue	$0	$50,000
Cartier	$20,000	$20,000
Cornfield Maze	$0	$60,000
Current Pot	$135,000	$255,000

Execution
Afi	2nd player executed

Hostage Rescue: The players move on to Monte Carlo, Monaco. One of the players, Steven, is kidnapped from his hotel room in the middle of the night. He is transported to a prison cell and placed in shackles and an iron mask. When the other players arrive for breakfast, they realize he is missing. The other players split into three groups to search for him (by helicopter, boat, and van), and are given clues to his whereabouts. If all eight players find and arrive at his secret location (Cannes, France) in less than two hours with three keys, they will add $50,000 to the pot. The players failed to pass the test in time.

Cartier: Three players are selected who have "Good Eyes" (Henry, Kate, and Kathryn). They are shown two watches, an authentic Cartier, and a fake. They are to determine which is real, and which is the phony, and the phony will be destroyed. If they are correct, $20,000 is added to the pot; if they are wrong, $20,000 is deducted from the pot. The players succeeded at this test.

Production vans test: During the Cartier test, production vans were parked outside the Chateau de Rochegude, where the other players wait for their next mission. The vans were purposely left unlocked and the crew was secretly filming on the rooftop to see if anyone would look into the vans. No penalties were at stake. Afi, Jennifer, Jim, Steven, and Wendi did not bother to look in the vans. However, Charlie was caught snooping, raising suspicion.

Cornfield maze: The other six players ("leaders" and "followers") are brought to a cornfield maze late at night. The three "leaders" are to guide three "followers" through the maze, and avoid two maze guards. Each team that completed the maze added $20,000 to the pot. All three teams failed at this test.

- At the elimination, after green screens appeared for Henry, Jennifer, Steven and Kathryn, the screen turned red when Afi's name was typed in. Wendy said that she felt another one of her allies was eliminated. Jim said he didn't expect her to be eliminated. She thought Henry tried to make himself look like the mole.

=== Episode 3 ===
Episode 3 recapOriginal airdate: January 23, 2001Location: Medina-Sidonia & Seville, Spain
Mission	Money earned	Possible earnings
Bullfight	$65,000	$75,000
Dirty Laundry	$10,000	$10,000
Dice Game	$40,000	$80,000
Current Pot	$250,000	$420,000

Exemption
Kate	Completed 4 tasks in Dice Game

Execution
Wendi	3rd player executed

Bullfight: The eight players traveled to Seville, Spain. They arrived at a bullring, where the next test involved bullfighting. If all eight players faced a charging bull two times, the group pot would earn $50,000. For each player (up to five) that performed a tienta (pulling the bull's tail down to the ground), a bonus $5,000 would be added. The players completed the test successfully, and three of them managed to perform the tienta as well.

Dirty Laundry: Three players were chosen to do the contestants' laundry. They were taken to a village where they had to find places to wash all eight loads, but only one load per location. If successful, $10,000 would be added to the pot. The players were successful.

Dice Game: The five other players each rolled a die. Depending on what was rolled, a rather unsavory task or a rather simple task had to be completed by that player (e.g., draw a nude or be drawn naked, dye one's hair or shave their head, wear a cast on one or both legs, etc.) If three players completed their task, $40,000 would be added to the pot. The final player to roll was offered a special twist. Roll the die four times and complete all four tasks, to earn an additional $40,000, and an exemption for his/her self.

1A. 1,2 or 3 - Paint a nude portrait
1B. 4,5 or 6 - Pose nude (Steven, rolled a 5)

2A. 1,2 or 3 - Cast one leg
2B. 4,5 or 6 - Cast both legs (Jim, rolled a 5)

3A. 1,2 or 3 - Dye your hair
3B. 4,5 or 6 - Shave your head (Kathryn, rolled a 4)

4A. 1,2 or 3 - Wear a ball and chain
4B. 4,5 or 6 - Wear a stockade (Wendi, rolled a 5)

5. All Four Tasks (Kate: 1B, 2B, 3A and 4A)

Although the first four players, except Wendi failed to complete their assigned tasks, Kate managed to complete all four of them to earn the $40,000 bonus.

=== Episode 4 ===
Episode 4 recapOriginal air date: January 30, 2001Location: Sancti Petri & Seville, Spain
Mission	Money earned	Possible earnings
Sniper	$0	$30,000
Trap University	$60,000	$120,000
Current Pot	$310,000	$570,000

Execution
Henry	4th player executed

Sniper: One player out of the group is selected to "take it easy" (the players select Kate, due to her accomplishments from the previous episode), and the rest are "looking for an adventure". Kate is taken to a church in a small village. The players are equipped with laser tag vests (but no weapons). While avoiding laser shooting snipers, the players must rescue Kate and bring her to the cinema and ring a bell. If successful, $30,000 is added to the pot. Unbeknownst to the players, Kate is offered an exemption if she shoots all her fellow players, and rings the bell by herself. The test was failed, and Kate did not earn the exemption.

Trap University: The players are taken to the University of Seville. They broke up into two groups. The first group was directed to solve eight brain teaser puzzles. For each correct answer, $15,000 would be added to the pot. Afterwards, the team was taken on a long, rather winding tour of the university campus. They arrived at a classroom where they saw the second team, live on video, solving the same puzzles. For each puzzle they solved, $15,000 would be deducted. The second team was not aware that they were costing money. One "runner" from the first group would then have to find his or her way back to the room, and convince the other team to stop working. The initial team successfully solved five of the brain-teasers, and the second team solved two. $15,000 was added because the runner started after the second group had begun to solve the second puzzle.

Telephone call: Before the quiz, each player was allowed a five-minute phone call to a family member.

Fake Production Notebook test: During routine one-on-one interviews, the production crew purposely left behind a fake production notebook. A hidden camera watched the players after the crew had left the room to see if they would read it. No penalties were at stake. Charlie, Henry, Jennifer, Jim, Kate, and Steven did not read it. However, Kathryn took the bait, reducing suspicion.

- At the elimination, Steven volunteered to go first and the screen turned green for him. After green screens appeared for Jennifer and Jim, the screen turned red when Henry's name was typed in. Jennifer said she was humored by the fact that Henry was eliminated. Steven said he felt like taking his own game through some of Henry's stories. Henry didn't reveal who he thought was the mole, but he thought Charlie would be eliminated that night.

=== Episode 5 ===
Episode 5 recapOriginal airdate: February 6, 2001Location: Paterna de Rivera & El Puerto de Santa María & Jerez, Spain
Mission	Money earned	Possible earnings
Three Routes	$40,000	$80,000
Reunion	$20,000	$30,000
Current Pot	$370,000	$680,000

Execution
Jennifer	5th player executed

Three Routes: The six remaining players split into three pairs: a "smart" team, a "resourceful" team, and a "stupid" team. The three teams' task is to each find their way to a hotel in Jerez, Spain. If they make it to the hotel before 8 p.m., they can stay there for the night. The "stupid" team is brought directly to the hotel, where they enjoy lavish spa treatment. The "smart" team is provided a Smart car, a map, a cell phone, and a few clues. The "resourceful" team is provided a truck filled with an array of odd items, including a scooter, a bicycle, a liferaft, and geese. It's soon realized the truck is unreliable, and is leaking oil. If either the "smart" or "resourceful" team joins the "stupid" group at the hotel, $40,000 will be added to the pot. However, if both groups arrive, the "stupid" team would be forced to sleep outside for the night. If the "stupid" team can lure the "smart" team awry, letting only the "resourceful" team arrive, the money added to the pot would double to $80,000. The "smart" team arrived at the hotel in time, adding $40,000 to the pot.

Reunion: After nearly three weeks of seclusion, a mystery loved one of each of the six players arrives to be part of the game for a day. The players are told six statements made by the loved ones about their respective player, and must match who the statement pertained to. For each correct answer, $5,000 is added to the pot. The players got four of the answers correct (Jennifer and Kate were wrong). However, all the players were reunited in the end.

- At the elimination, Anderson entered the player's names in random order. After green screens appeared for both Kathryn and Steven, the screen turned red when Jennifer's name was typed in. Charlie thought she played a great game. She didn't reveal who she thought was the mole but thought Steven and Kathryn made a pact.

=== Episode 6 ===
Episode 6 recapOriginal airdate: February 13, 2001Location: San Lúcar & Jerez, Spain
Mission	Money earned	Possible earnings
Fortress	$0	$60,000
Carriage	$60,000	$60,000
1 penalty incurred	−$20,000	
Current Pot	$410,000	$800,000

Execution
Kate	6th player executed

Penalty: Kathryn and Steven violate the rules when they are found in Jim's room. The players had been instructed to not leave their rooms.

Fortress: The players are taken to an abandoned fort and told they must defend it from four trained aggressors. The target is a glass bowl, illuminated by two spotlights on the roof. The aggressor's objective is to either disable both spotlights or move the glass bowl out of the light. To succeed, the players must keep the bowl illuminated from sunset to sunrise, or shoot and hit all the aggressors, preventing further attacks. Success in this task is worth $60,000. While the aggressors were not armed, the players were armed with paintball guns. The players failed at this test.

Carriage: The five players are taken to a library, where they are given a series of clues. However, the books are written in Spanish, yet the players are allowed to use English-Spanish dictionaries and the catalog card to help. The clues point to specific books on the shelves which contain a ticket to ride a horse-drawn carriage. If they can find the book, and take the ticket to a specific stop on the ride, they can board the carriage at that point. The player must go back to the library if they have a ticket for a different stop. If all players board, before the ride is finished, $60,000 is added to the pot.

After answering question #1, Kathryn hands the ticket to Kate, and Kate gets the map portion from Charlie and Steven. She manages to make it to stop #1 on time. Charlie fails to find the book for question #2, but Jim and Kathryn find ticket #3 and hands it to Charlie. As Charlie checks the map, he asks if they skipped question #2 and Jim says no, although they actually did. He goes to stop #2, but is sent back because he has ticket #3. Meanwhile, Jim, Kathryn, and Steven find tickets #4, #5, and #6. Charlie fails to answer question #7, but manages to answer question #8. All the players made it onto the carriage, succeeding at the test.

- At the elimination, Jim volunteered to go first and the screen turned green for him. Steven went next and he was also revealed to be safe. Kate was the next volunteer and the screen turned red for her. Kathryn said she felt it was either her or Kate that night. Jim said he was glad to have survived. Charlie thought he would be executed and Steven said he liked Kate more as the game went on. Kate didn't reveal who she thought the mole was but as she was leaving, she said she thought she knew for sure who the mole was.

=== Episode 7 ===
Episode 7 recapOriginal airdate: February 20, 2001Location: Trebujena & Seville & Jerez, Spain
Mission	Money earned	Possible earnings
Sheep herding	$20,000	$30,000
Art	$0	$40,000
Trust	$60,000	$60,000
Current Pot	$490,000	$930,000

Exemption
Steven	Convincing all players to pass at Trust

Execution
Charlie	7th player executed

Sheep herding: Two players are chosen as the group that "can count to 751." Their test is to herd sheep into a pen, and count them. Three dogs are provided to help, but only one is trained to herd sheep. If they successfully herd the sheep, $20,000 is added to the pot. If they count the number of sheep correctly, an additional $10,000 is added. The players succeeded at the main mission, but failed to earn the bonus (there were 751 sheep, the exact number listed at the beginning of the test).

Art: The other two players are chosen as the "arty" group. Their test is to create a piece of artwork which will be displayed in a real art gallery amongst many fine conceptual art pieces. They have countless items in a workshop at their disposal. After completing the piece, a professional art critic is brought in to see if she could spot their work and distinguish it from the authentic pieces. If they fool her and she chooses the wrong piece, $20,000 will be added to the pot. If the other two players (who played the sheep herding game) could pick out their piece, an additional $20,000 would be added. The players failed at this mission.

Trust: The four players are asked to list the player whom they most and least wish would get executed. Steven is selected by the group as least wanted to be executed. Steven must convince the other three players to be blindfolded and participate in a challenging task. Depending on their decisions, the following outcomes would result.

1. If all three players complete their challenge, $60,000 is added to the pot, and Steven receives an exemption.
2. If two players complete their challenge, $60,000 is added to the pot.
3. If only one player completes their challenge, no money is added to the pot, and that one player receives an exemption.
4. If no players complete their challenge, no money is added to the pot, and Steven receives an exemption.

The three tasks are as follows: one player has to stand blindfolded against a wall as a knife thrower throws a hatchet at them. One player, blindfolded, has to run across hot coals. The third player has to walk a plank blindfolded off a bridge and over a ravine.

Steven was able to convince all three players to complete their task, however, none were as risky as suspected. The knife thrower did not throw the hatchet at Kathryn, he walked up and simply banged it into the wall. In addition, the coals Jim ran over ended up not being lit. Charlie's task was the only one with some danger, however, he was strapped to harnesses, and could not have fallen.

=== Episode 8 ===
Episode 8 recapOriginal airdate: February 27, 2001Location: Montejaque & Ronda, Spain
Mission	Money earned	Possible earnings
Three Questions	$20,000	$30,000
Three Rooms	$0	$75,000
Final Pot	$510,000	$1,035,000

Three Questions: The three remaining players are asked personal and revealing questions about each other. One by one, each player is hidden in a village. The two other players are asked the same questions, and must try to match the answers given by the hidden player. After each response, the two players go either left or right in a fork in the road. If they answer all three questions correctly, they will successfully guide themselves through the village and find the hidden player. If they make just one wrong answer, they will go down the wrong fork in the road and will not find the hidden player. Each round is worth $10,000, for a maximum of $30,000. Two of three tests were passed.

Three Rooms: The final test sees the players check into a hotel in Ronda, Spain. All three players are locked in separate rooms, each with a different environment, different clues and different objects and resources. All three must use what they have in their rooms to figure out how to contact the others, and escape to the lobby within 90 minutes. If all three meet Anderson within the allotted time, $75,000 is added to the pot. According to clues during the game, this test occurred on the final full day of filming, October 19, 2000. The players failed at this test.

Final quiz: Steven, Jim, and Kathryn took the final quiz. The finalist who scores the highest on the 25-question final quiz will win the game and the grand prize of $510,000 out of a possible $1,050,000.

=== Episode 9 ===
The details of the final quiz were revealed. After taking the final quiz, the three finalists were given the results that same night. The three players sat one at a time to watch the screen to see if they were executed. The results, however, were to be kept a secret. Four months later, the executed players were reunited to see the results of the final quiz. Highlights of the season, including sabotage, and "moleish" behavior was documented, as well as secret hidden clues. Kathryn is revealed to be the mole, with Steven the winner of $510,000, and Jim the runner-up, the final player executed. It turned out that Charlie suspected Kathryn from day 1, and unwittingly gave the information to Steven, who in turn gave it to Jim. In the end, Steven answered 16 out of 25 questions correctly on the final quiz. Jim answered 13 correctly.

== Mole sabotage ==
Hostage Rescue: Kathryn was part of the land-based team, and recognized that all the teams were making numerous errors. She figured out early that they were at the wrong fort, but convinced the players to look again and stalled them. She wasted enough time that Jennifer's disappearance factored into the players losing the challenge.

Cartier: The team had to decide which watch was authentic, and which was fake. Kathryn tried repeatedly to stall, and insisted on asking for additional assistance.

Dice game: Kathryn discussed with Wendi the day before that if asked, she would not shave her head for money. The dice game was staged such that Kathryn's task was to do just that: shave her head. Since she was planning for her wedding in a couple months, she refused to do the task, had a good excuse, and avoided suspicion.

Laser tag: Considering the difficulty of the game, and having reasonable suspicion that the game was unwinnable anyway, Kathryn kept a low profile. She did little to help, and simply allowed the other players to mess the game up. The game failed miserably, and she avoided all suspicion.

Three routes: Kathryn purposely chose to be part of the "resourceful" team. She knew the van would eventually break down, so she attempted to waste time having Steven try to fix it. She also purposely missed a turnoff, and blamed Steve for poor navigation.

Fake Production Notebook test: Kathryn was the only person to read the fake production notebook, reducing suspicion about her.

Fortress test: Kathryn took the interior, and admitted to all other players that her position was "weak." Her complaints were largely ignored. She was able to communicate with the aggressors via a secret radio, told them of the team's plan, and told them of the weak security inside. She then made a feeble attempt to defend it. The other players broke down afterwards, and blame was diverted elsewhere.

Art: Kathryn noticed that the professional pieces of art were very simple. Her strategy was to throw as much junk as possible into their piece, such that it would stand out as complex from the others. The art critic even stated that the jewels (a feature she insisted be included) were a give-away.

Trust: The producers did not give Kathryn any information about the test, so that she would exhibit genuine fear. After she fainted, she felt she had to go through with the task, otherwise it would stand out as obvious sabotage.

Hotel rooms: After being given all of the information ahead of time about the rather difficult and complex test, Kathryn attempted to guide Steven and Jim though the test, and be seen as the hero who won the test for the group. She thought that winning the game would cause one last bit of confusion for the other players. Both Steven and Jim, however, were unable to pick up on her (rather obvious) clues, and the test failed.

During the final episode, it was revealed that Kathryn struggled to keep her cover as the mole at certain times during the four weeks of filming. She started crying after Manuel and Charlie were executed, feeling sorry for them. In the later parts of the show, she broke down during the three questions test (after a stinging question about whether she would cheat on her soon-to-be husband), and also broke down in her room during the hotel room test about her role in the game.

== Hidden clues ==
Episode 1:

- Opening Shots: During the opening scene when the players arrived, Kathryn was the fourth to arrive, and the word Mole has four letters in it.
- Night out in Paris: When some of the players were asked to repack the other players' belongings into the official mole bags, Anderson held up Kathryn's bag as an example.
- ATM: When Anderson says, "Clues about the Mole's identity", it shows Kathryn's profile on the screen.

Episode 2

- Cartier: Towards the end of the test, the group decided on which watch is the fake. Kathryn suggested "Pulling the trigger" on the choice. The one they chose as a fake was shot, therefore "Pulling the trigger" hints at Kathryn's beforehand knowledge of the challenges as the mole.

Episode 5:

- Monologue: During Anderson's monologue at the beginning of the episode, he said "Henry paid the Price. He was the Mole's 4th Victim." The two clues were the number four (again referring to the number of letters in the word Mole), and Kathryn's last name is Price and it's the "fourth" word in the sentence.

Episode 7:

- Superstitions: At dinner before the test, Anderson asks whether the players have become more superstitious. Jim reveals that he carries a baggie of his hair. He says that when it was shaved he lost his powers, like Samson. Kathryn chimes in, "Samson and Delilah." In the Book of Judges, Delilah was a mole for the Philistines, convincing Samson to reveal his weakness and then cutting his hair to weaken him.
