= Seoul High School =

- Hangul: 서울고등학교

Location
- 1526-1, Seocho-3-dong, Seocho-gu; Seoul; Korea

Information
- Type: Public
- Motto: Be Clean, Diligent and Responsible (깨끗하자, 부지런하자, 책임지키자)
- Established: Mar 5, 1946
- Founder: Kim, Won Kyu
- Principal: Oh Seok Kyu (오석규)
- Faculty: approx. 114
- Gender: Boys
- Enrolment: 1831
- Campus: 73,744 m^{2}
- Tree: Pine
- Flower: Mugunghwa
- Newspaper: The Seoul Senior
- Website: http://seoul.sen.hs.kr/index.do

Seoul High School (Hangul: 서울고등학교) is a public high school located in Seocho-dong, the greater Gangnam area Seocho-gu, Seoul, South Korea. Seoul High School is a member school of Gangnam School District Eight (강남8학군).

== History ==
The school was established at the site of Gyeonghuigung in 1946, moving to the current site (Seocho-dong) due to restoration of Gyeonghuigung. Named Kyung Sung Middle School during Japanese occupation.

== History ==
- Feb 1 1946 Inauguration of the first principal Kim, Won Kyu
- Mar 5 1946 School opening ceremony and entrance ceremony (12 classes, 552 students)
- June 1947 Named 'Seoul Public Middle School'
- June 5, 1949 First graduation ceremony
- Sep 1 1951 In accordance with the reform of educational system separated as Seoul High School (10th-12th grades)
- Feb 28 1971 In accordance with the equalization of middle Schools, Seoul Middle School was closed after the twentieth graduation ceremony
- July 3, 1971 Establishment of Inwang Scholarship Foundation
- June 9, 1980 Moved to the present campus
- Mar 1 1985 Expanded to 60 classes
- Sep 1 2004 Inauguration of the twenty-third Principal Sung, Kee Won
- Feb 3 2005 Held the fifty-seventh graduation ceremony (39,013 alumni in total)
- Mar 1 2006 Decreased to 51 classes
- Mar 1 2007 Inauguration of the 24th Principal Lee, Kyu Seok
- Mar 1 2007 48 classes in total and a special class for the handicapped
- Feb 1 2008 The 60th graduation ceremony (42,187 alumni in total)
- Mar 1 2008 45 classes in total and a special class for the handicapped
- Mar 1 2008 Inauguration of the 25th Principal Park, Hee-Song

== Memorial facility ==
- Samil Pagoda: Built in celebration of the 41st anniversary of March 1st Movement
- Pochung Monument: Set up on June 15, 1956, in remembrance of Seoul High School students who sacrificed their lives for the Korean War or the April Revolution
- The Statue of Major Kang, Jae-gu: Set up on April 12, 1986, in honor of Major Kang, who sacrificed his life to save more than 100 subordinates on Oct 4, 1965, when one of his subordinates threw a hand grenade in the wrong direction by mistake during the military training for the Vietnamese War

== Notable alumni ==
=== Academia ===
- Lee Soo-sung, former president of Seoul National University and prime minister of South Korea

=== Business ===
- Choi Ji-Sung, CEO of Samsung Electronics
- Chung Mong-won, CEO of Halla Group and Mando Corporation, IIHF Hall of Fame inductee

=== Public service ===
- Yoon Jeung-Hyun, Minister of Strategy & Finance
- Lee Shi-Yoon, former chairman of the Board of Audit and Inspection of Korea and professor at the law school of Seoul National University
- Won Se-Hoon, former chairman of National Intelligence Service

=== Politics ===
- Cho Soon-hyung, assemblyman

=== Literature ===
- Choi In-ho, novelist
- Hwang Dong-gyu, poet

=== Sports ===
- Kim Dong-Soo, professional baseball player
- Lee Sang-Hoon, professional baseball player
- Kang Baek-Ho, professional baseball player

=== Culture ===
- Bae Chang-ho, film director
- Jang Sun-woo, film director
- Lee Soon-jae, actor and former assemblyman
- Yim Jae-beom, rock singer
- Joo Sang-wook, actor

== See also ==
- Category:Seoul High School alumni
