= House Hunters =

American reality television series

- Genre: Reality
- Directed by: Anna Skąpska
- Narrated by: Suzanne Whang; Colette Whitaker; Andromeda Dunker
- Country of origin: United States
- Original language: English
- No. of seasons: 262
- No. of episodes: 2,415+

Production
- Running time: 22 minutes

Original release
- Network: HGTV
- Release: October 7, 1999 – present

House Hunters is an American unscripted television series that airs on HGTV and is produced by Pie Town Productions. Each episode follows people making a decision about a new home purchase or rental. Debuting in October 1999, the show has produced over 2,400 episodes to date.

== Format ==
House Hunters follows individuals, couples, or families searching for a new home with the assistance of a local real estate agent. In each episode, the buyers must decide among three potential houses or apartments to buy or rent, ultimately choosing one before the end of the episode. The show concludes by revisiting the chosen home a few weeks or months later, when participants describe the changes they've made and the effect the new home has had on their life.

Although the TV format is that of a reality show, producers usually recruit buyers who are already in escrow with one of the houses that is featured in the episode. One buyer stated that "the show is not really a reality show. You have to already own the house that gets picked at the end of the show. But the other houses in the show are actually the other houses we considered buying." The usual course of events, as reported by The Washington Post, is that the two properties not purchased are usually chosen by producers, recycled from the buyers' completed hunt, or staged by obliging friends. Network director Brian Balthazar acknowledges that production requires some advance knowledge of the purchased home. Buyers are said to be typically paid $500 to film around 50 hours of footage, which is then edited down.

In response to questions about the show's authenticity, the show's publicist said:

We're making a television show, so we manage certain production and time constraints, while honoring the home buying process. To maximize production time, we seek out families who are pretty far along in the process. Often everything moves much more quickly than we can anticipate, so we go back and revisit some of the homes that the family has already seen and we capture their authentic reactions.

=== Narration ===
The series was originally hosted on-screen and narrated by Suzanne Whang through 2007. She died in 2019 after a 13-year battle with breast cancer; she expressed pride at the diversity of house hunters featured on the show. In 2008, the show was narrated by Colette Whitaker. The current (2021) narrator, Andromeda Dunker, began voicing the show in 2009, but does not appear on screen.

== Marketing and growth ==
A January 2016 Washington Post article said that the "milquetoast" and "proudly formulaic" series was "one of the most unlikely and unstoppable juggernauts on TV," consistently attracting 25 million viewers per month, nearly all through household television. Calling House Hunters "HGTV's no-risk crown jewel", another Washington Post commentator noted that, paradoxically, the show was "low budget, incredibly formulaic and lacking any prestige or even a host".

HGTV is said to have referred to itself as "shelter TV", not only because it deals with homes but also because, according to a professor of cinematic studies, "it feels like you can protect yourself from other things going on in the world". In 2019 another Washington Post commentator reported that millennial and Generation Z viewers make up a significant portion of HGTV's audience, and though its unscripted programming is "decidedly uncool", it is "endlessly appealing" and offers "both an escape from global chaos and a window into the seemingly distant fantasy of homeownership". Characterizing the show as "an on-screen utopia" that has included buyers of varied age, race, sexual orientation and location, it presents "people from all backgrounds seamlessly achieving the same domestic goal of purchasing a home".

The show's 26 first-year episodes (1999) grew to 447 new episodes in 2015, with the number of new episodes tripling between the 2005 peak of the real estate bubble and the 2009 end of the Great Recession. As of 2016, fifteen camera crews were recording new American episodes at any given time, with another 25 teams of directors, camera chiefs, sound technicians and local fixers producing House Hunters International episodes.

The average episode is filmed in three days, and costs a small fraction of the US $2 to $4 million typically spent on an hour-long TV drama. The show's ratings and "safe predictability" attract advertisers, especially those targeting homeowners. Marketing techniques have included in-episode product placement and sponsor-related quizzes.

== Spin-offs ==
- House Hunters International is the first House Hunters spin-off series. It features the same narrator, but focuses on properties outside of the United States. Normally it features an individual, couple, or family moving from either the United States or Canada to another country with a different language and culture either for a retirement or vacation house, schooling, or job opportunities. House Hunters International can be viewed on HGTV.
- House Hunters on Vacation is the second House Hunters spin-off series. Rather than featuring the same narrators as the other two series, this show introduces a new host, Taniya Nayak. Families have the opportunity to stay in a vacation home of their choosing for one week. Each episode has homebuyers choose which of three properties they would most like to stay in for their week-long vacation (which is paid for by HGTV).
- House Hunters: Where Are They Now focuses on people who have previously purchased homes on House Hunters. They are typically visited 6 to 12 months after the original filming and show how they have settled in.
- House Hunters Renovation is a one-hour show as opposed to the typical 30-minute episodes. The first 30 minutes are spent in typical fashion, looking for the home and then deciding between three homes. The second half is spent following the purchaser through the renovations they do to their homes.
- House Hunters International Renovation fuses together two other spin-offs, taking the original renovation concept around the world.
- House Hunters: Million Dollar Homes crosses international boundaries investigating lavish estates. This show focuses on people looking to spend over one million U.S. dollars (or the local equivalent) on their dream home. This is not listed as a separate series by HGTV, but as a designation for occasional episodes across several different seasons (of which there are now several dozen) of the original House Hunters.
- House Hunters International: Million Dollar Budgets is a separate series, again combining the concepts from two other spin-offs.
- House Hunters Family focuses on entire families rather than an individual or couple. Parents and their kids house hunt together to select which house suits them best.
- Island Hunters is House Hunters focusing on buyers moving to tropical islands. Island Hunters premiered on New Year's Day 2013. Buyers are looking for a tropical getaway: their own private island. Families investigate three separate islands, complete with vacation homes and private beachfronts. It is hosted by Chris Krolow, CEO of Private Islands Inc., who is also the executive producer of the show. Rental episodes are hosted by his associate Adam Mckie. The series was renewed for a second season in May 2015.
- Houseboat Hunters is House Hunters with people seeking a primary residence or a vacation home that floats (such as the eponymous houseboat).
- House Hunters: RV features people who are seeking a recreational vehicle as their primary residence or vacation home on-the-go.
- Tiny House Hunters debuted in November 2014 and features families looking to downsize to a house smaller than 600 square feet (56 m^{2}).
- House Hunters Pop'd debuted in November 2014 and features families looking to purchase a home while trivia questions and facts pop up on the screen, similar to VH1's Pop-Up Video.
- House Hunters Off the Grid features people seeking homes in remote and secluded areas, where they live off the grid.
- House Hunters Outside the Box premiered in December 2017. It features home buyers who are not looking for a traditional home building. Instead, they are looking for theaters, lighthouses, warehouses, or other buildings to convert for use as a home.
- House Hunters: Comedians on Couches premiered on June 2, 2020 and ran for eight episodes on HGTV. In the series, comedians watch classic episodes of House Hunters and react to the show. The series later returned in January 2021 with the title House Hunters Comedians on Couches: Unfiltered, exclusively on discovery+. The series is hosted by Natasha Leggero and Dan Levy, with a guest comedian featured in each episode. Featured comedians on the series have included John Mulaney, Whitney Cummings, and J. B. Smoove.
- Car Hunters, a Fall 2010 series of Chevrolet commercials using the House Hunters format, in which a prospective buyer test drives a Chevrolet Cruze or Chevrolet Traverse and two other cars, always choosing the Chevrolet vehicle. Conducted by an independent research firm, the shopper was not informed until the end that Car Hunters was actually a commercial for Chevrolet. The series of ads, which carried the same look as House Hunters (apart from using a blue color scheme instead of yellow), debuted on HGTV in September 2010 as part of a sweepstakes sponsored by HGTV and Chevrolet.
- House Hunters: Amazing Water Homes premiered in 2023 with ten episodes featuring couples buying properties on or near the water. Season 4 is currently in production.
- House Hunters: Cabin Dreams premiered in 2024 with ten episodes buying cabin properties that ranged from the small and rustic to the big and luxurious.

== Appearance fees ==
The families are reported to make $500 for appearing on the original series, while making $1,500 for House Hunters International.

== See also ==
- Escape to the Country
