= From Here on OUT =

American TV sitcom (2014)

- Genre: Sitcom
- Created by: Terry Ray
- Written by: Terry Ray
- Directed by: Sam Irvin
- Starring: Terry Ray; T.J. Hoban; Suzanne Whang; Juliet Mills; Austin Robert Miller; Adrian Gonzalez; Michael Lanham
- Composer: Nick Soole
- Country of origin: United States
- Original language: English
- No. of seasons: 1
- No. of episodes: 6

Production
- Executive producers: Paul Colichman; Stephen P. Jarchow
- Producer: David Millbern
- Editor: Michael Willer
- Camera setup: Single Camera
- Running time: Approx. 21 minutes (without commercials)
- Production company: here! TV

Original release
- Network: here! TV
- Release: February 28, 2014

From Here on OUT is an American sitcom on Here TV, starring Terry Ray, T.J. Hoban, Suzanne Whang, Juliet Mills, Austin Robert Miller, Adrian Gonzalez and Michael Lanham. The series, which premiered on February 28, 2014, is the first original gay sitcom created by a gay network.

== Synopsis ==
After years of failed attempts, aging gay writer Jimmy Randall (Terry Ray) finally sells his show Guy Dubai: International Gay Spy to the 18 year-old President of the tiny, financially strapped cable network Here TV with the deal breaking proviso that Jimmy must hire an openly gay leading man.

With a non-existent budget, that 'proviso' was the easiest item on Jimmy’s to-do list when he casts the breathtakingly sexy and talented Sam Decker (T.J. Hoban) – but Sam, unbeknownst to the network, is secretly straight. To keep from losing their jobs, Jimmy and Sam must pretend to be an unlikely but believable couple as they, a sweet but slutty pool boy (Adrian Gonzalez), a diva maid / actress wannabe (Suzanne Whang), the teenage network president (Austin Robert Miller), and his domineering nanny / receptionist (Juliet Mills), along with a ridiculously hot office assistant (Michael Lanham), struggle every week to make a new television show ... and in the process, a new family.

=== Regular cast ===
- Terry Ray – Jimmy Randall
- Michael Lanham – Brad
- T. J. Hoban – Sam Decker
- Adrian Gonzalez – Rico
- Suzanne Whang – Divina
- Austin Robert Miller – Taylor
- Juliet Mills – Dottie Cooper

=== Guest cast ===
- Julie Brown
- Sam Pancake
- Jesse Pepe - Sean
- David Millbern
- Anthony Marciona
- Emrhys Cooper
- John J. Joseph
- Junade Khan
- Gary Anthony Stennette
- Spike Mayer
- Billy Yoder
- Lorielle New
