= Here TV =

American LGBT television station

- Country: United States

Ownership
- Owner: Here Media
- Key people: Paul Colichman and Stephen Jarchow (founders)

History
- Launched: 2002

Links
- Website: heretv.com

Availability

Streaming media
- Sling TV: Internet Protocol

Here TV (also known as Here! or stylized as here!) is an American premium television network targeting LGBTQ audiences. Launched in 2002, Here TV is available nationwide on all major cable systems, fiber optics systems, and Internet TV providers as either a 24/7 premium subscription channel, a video on demand (VOD) service, and/or a subscription video on demand (SVOD) service. Here TV is actively involved in the LGBTQ community and offers sponsorship to yearly events such as gay pride events and film festivals as well as supporting a number of community organizations. In 2013, Here TV programming became available on the YouTube paid channels.

== Programming ==
Here TV offers a variety of programming targeted toward the lesbian, gay, bisexual, and transgender (LGBTQ) community. Here TV both produces original programming and acquires programming to air on the network. The channel airs original series, movies, documentaries, talk shows, reality series, and comedy specials.

=== Notable Shows ===
Dante's Cove
Created by Michael Costanza and directed by Sam Irvin, Dante's Cove combined elements of the horror and soap opera genres in telling the story of Kevin (Gregory Michael) and Toby (Charlie David), a young couple seeking to be together and overcome the dark mystical forces that conspire to separate them. The show debuted in 2005 to a mixed critical reception. The third season ended on December 21, 2007.

Conframa
Conframa is a dramedy series that takes a candid look at what happens when you bring together a loving couple and someone else into the relationship. Created by Anthony Bawn, directed by Robert Adams. Season 1 episodes begin airing in September 2018 to mostly favorable reviews & is also available on the streaming platform Amazon Prime. BroadwayWorld announced on August 15, 2019 that the series was renewed for a second season with new cast members and executive produced by Shaun Cairo (Pitchfork (film).

The Lair
The Lair is an American gay-themed vampire television series produced by Here. The first season, consisting of six episodes, wrapped production in January 2007. The first two episodes premiered on June 1, 2007. Season 2, consisting of nine episodes, debuted on September 5, 2008. A third season of 13 episodes was announced in September 2008 and Colton Ford confirmed that filming took place in October and November 2008. Season 3 premiered September 4, 2009.

Just Josh
Just Josh is an American talk show hosted by television personality, writer, and director Josh Rosenzweig. Filmed on location throughout New York City, Rosenzweig conducts celebrity interviews, visits VIP events, and discusses all things pop culture. The show premiered on January 28, 2011.

For & Against
For & Against is an American talk show hosted by Jim Morrison. Each episode features Morrison discussing issues that affect the LGBT community. Morrison also interviews policymakers and pundits spanning the political landscape. The show provides news and headlines from an LGBTQ perspective. For & Against premiered on January 6, 2012.

She's Living for This
She's Living for This is an American television comedy and variety series created by Keith Levy and Josh Rosenzweig. The series stars drag performer Sherry Vine. The series premiered on February 24, 2012.

From Here on OUT
From Here on OUT is an American television sitcom created and written by Terry Ray, produced by David Millbern and directed by Sam Irvin. The series is a comic spoof about making the ultra sexy TV show "Guy Dubai: International Gay Spy" for a fictionalized and wild send-up of Here TV. The cast includes Terry Ray, Juliet Mills, T.J. Hoban and Suzanne Whang. The series premiered on February 28, 2014.

Single, Out
Single, Out is an Australian comedy drama television series created by Lee Galea and produced by Indie Melbourne Productions. The series follows Adam, a young man who comes out as gay following his first sexual experience.

=== Notable Documentaries ===
30 Years From Here
30 Years From Here is an American made-for-television documentary about the 30-year war on the HIV and AIDS pandemic. The documentary, directed by Josh Rosenzweig, debuted on November 25, 2011. In 2012, 30 Years From Here was nominated for a Daytime Emmy Award by the National Academy of Television Arts & Sciences.

- Heart of Broadway: The Ensemble Behind Broadway Cares/Equity Fights AIDS
- The Ribbon of Hope Celebration

=== Other series ===
- Go Go
- Not So Straight in Silver Lake
- The Gay Agenda
- Gayliens
- Food Fetish
- Indoor Boys
- Collar Confessions
- Derek & Cameron
- Portugays
- Demonhuntr

== Corporate history ==
- Here TV launched in 2002 as an on-demand and pay-per-view service available in either three-hour blocks or as a monthly subscription. The company brokered distribution deals with DirecTV in 2003, and expanded to In Demand, TVN Entertainment, Time Warner Cable, and Adelphia. Deals with Comcast and Cox followed in early 2005.
- Here TV expanded to a 24-hour premium network in October 2004.
- In 2012 it was announced that select Here TV programming would be made available on demand through the online service Hulu.
- In 2013, Here TV programming became available on the YouTube paid channels.

== Awards ==
- In 2006, Here TV shared the GLAAD Media Awards’ Barbara Gittings Award with cable networks Logo and Q Television Network. The Barbara Gittings Award honors pioneering individuals, groups, and media outlets that have made significant contributions to the development of LGBTQ media.
- In 2009, Here TV became the first LGBTQ network to earn a Daytime Entertainment Emmy Award nomination. It was nominated in the Outstanding Special Class Special Category for its broadcast of The Ribbon of Hope Celebration.
