= Terry Ray (actor) =

American actor (born 1961)

- Born: Terry Wayne Ray; February 12, 1961 (age 65); Columbus, Ohio, United States
- Occupations: actor, writer, producer, director
- Years active: 1988—present
- Website: www.terryray.tv

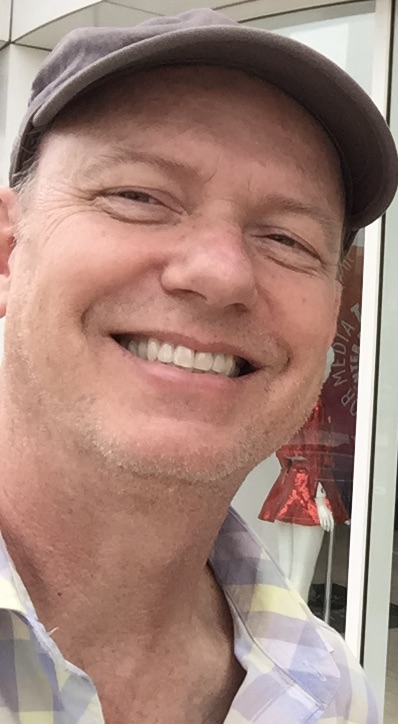
Actor / Writer Terry Ray

Terry Ray (born February 12, 1961) is an American actor, screenwriter, playwright and producer. Some of his work includes Gaydar (2002) and the long-running play Electricity (2016). Gaydar appeared in over 120 film festivals around the world, winning numerous awards and was named by California Independent Film Festival as one of the "Best Short Comedy Films of the Decade". Ray is the creator and writer of Here TVs sitcom From Here on OUT, the first original gay sitcom created by a gay network. Terry stars in the sitcom, along with Juliet Mills, Suzanne Whang and T.J. Hoban. Ray wrote and co-starred along with Dawn Wells in a series of spoofs of her classic Mary Ann character from Gilligan's Island called She's Still on That Freakin' Island. Terry is also the co-creator, co-writer and stars in the series My Sister Is So Gay with Loni Anderson who plays his mother. The show also stars Tilky Jones, Wendy Michaels, Debra Wilson and Rae Dawn Chong.

Terry Ray is the playwright of the hit play Electricity which Ray has been starring in since 2016 and touring the country to rave reviews. Over four years in three venues Electricity became the longest running play in Palm Springs. Ray won The Desert Theatre League Star Award for Best Original Play.

Terry Ray's 1987 appearance on Scrabble is listed as number 3 in the 10 Great Gay Moments in Game Show History, after Charles Nelson Reilly and Paul Lynde. In the same appearance, Terry was also named as one of the 5 Weirdest Game Show Contestants Ever, by Movieline.

Terry's first professional writing job was the stage performance "Hollywood Goes Classical" at the venerable Dorothy Chandler Pavilion starring Mickey Rooney, Michael York, Dean Jones, Rhonda Fleming and several other classic film stars. He wrote and starred in two more shows at the Dorothy Chandler Pavilion, one co-starring Amanda Bynes and the other Hilary Duff.

Each episode of Ray's series TV Therapy features a different classic TV character played once again by the original actor in therapy today with all the issues that character would have now. Guest stars include Erin Murphy as Tabitha from Bewitched, Dawn Wells as Mary Ann from Gilligan's Island, Ted Lange as Isaac from The Love Boat, Kathy Garver as Cissy from Family Affair, Juliet Mills as Nanny in Nanny and the Professor, Bob Bergen as Porky Pig, Wesley Eure and Kathy Coleman as Will and Holly from Land of the Lost, Butch Patrick as Eddie from The Munsters, Alexandra Paul as Stephanie from Baywatch, Johnny Whitaker as Johnny in Sigmund and the Sea Monsters, and Jon Provost as Timmy from Lassie.

Terry is also the voice of the Gaydar Gun, a spinoff toy from the film Gaydar.

Ray has acted in over 120 plays in theaters across the country, sharing the stage with stars such as Elaine Stritch, Dixie Carter, Patricia Heaton and Matthew Perry. In December 2022, Terry Ray, along with Steve Rosenbaum, co-founded the LGBT theater, The Bent, in Palm Springs which launched with the world premiere of Terry Ray's play The Lincoln Debate, a comedic but entirely factual examination of the four years Abraham Lincoln shared a bed with Joshua Speed, a man history records as Lincoln's best friend. The Bent is one of only a handful of theaters in Southern California dedicated entirely to presenting LGBTQ stories and authors. Its home is at the Palm Springs Cultural Center. Since its inception The Bent has quickly grown to be one of the most respected theaters in the Coachella Valley with its production winning multiple awards year after year.

== Filmography ==
Year	Title	Role
2024	Here We Are	Bobby
2024	The Lair: OnlyFangs	Irving
2022	Jacked	Malcolm
2019-Current	TV Therapy	Dr. Stephen Nielsen (plus writer / producer)
2021	Gays Without Cages	Gavin (plus director)
2012-2019	Child of the '70s	James Hunter
2016-2019	My Sister Is So Gay	Seth (plus writer / producer)
2017	Love Unplugged	(screenwriter)
2015-2017	She's Still on that Freakin' Island	Actor (plus writer)
2015	Joe Dirt 2: Beautiful Loser	Mr. Yauch
2015	Modd Couples	(co-creator & writer)
2015	It Had to Be You	writer (story by)
2014	Mentor	Walter
2014	From Here on OUT	Jimmy Randall (plus creator & writer)
2012	A.N.T. Farm	Samuel French
2012	The End of Our Lives	Kenneth
2011	The Rosie Show	Bruce the Elf
2009	SpongeBob SquarePants	Craig Ferguson's Assistant
2009	Cost of Living	Buck (plus writer & producer)
2007	Drake & Josh	Wedding Coordinator
2005	Passions	Tom Stevens
2005	Receiver	Joe McCormick
2004	Men's Mix 1	Randy (Gaydar Segment)
2004	The Mullets	Greeter
2003	Titillating Steven	Hotel Desk Clerk
2002	Gaydar	Randy (plus writer & producer)
2002	Waiting Room	Nurse
2002	Teddy Bears' Picnic	Can-Can Dancer
2002	All That	Dad with toupee
2001	The Amanda Show	Waiter
2000	7th Heaven	Theater Manager
2000	Kenan & Kel	Peppy Employee
2000	7-Teen Sips	Jimmy McDonald
1999	Days of Our Lives	French Waiter
1998	The Godson	Waiter
1997	The Good Bad Guy	Milo
1996	Clown TV	Nosy (plus writer)
1995	Angel's Tide	Bank Teller
1994	Confessions of a Marriage Junkie	Thayer Threadgill
1994	In Living Color	Man with Shish Kebab
1989	Road House	Dancing Barfly (uncredited)
1988	Elvira: Mistress of the Dark	Nerdy Townsperson (uncredited)
1988	Die Hard	S.W.A.T. (uncredited)
1988	Midnight Run	Deplaning Passenger (uncredited)
1988	Night Wars	P.O.W.
1988	Hell Comes to Frogtown	Frog Guard
