= Guilty as Charged (film) =

- Directed by: Sam Irvin
- Written by: Charles Gale
- Produced by: Randolph Gale
- Starring: Rod Steiger; Lauren Hutton
- Cinematography: Richard Michalak
- Edited by: Kevin Tent
- Music by: Steve Bartek
- Distributed by: IRS Media
- Release date: April 19, 1991 (WorldFest-Houston)
- Running time: 95 minutes
- Country: United States
- Language: English
- Budget: $1.3 million

Guilty as Charged is a 1991 American comedy film directed by Sam Irvin and starring Rod Steiger and Lauren Hutton.

== Cast ==
- Rod Steiger as Kallin
- Lauren Hutton as Liz
- Heather Graham as Kimberly
- Lyman Ward as Stanford
- Isaac Hayes as Aloysius
- Zelda Rubinstein as Edna
- Michael Beach as Hamilton
- Irwin Keyes as Deek
- Earl Boen as Chemical Manufacturer
- Ricky Dean Logan as Ricky Landon
- Gale Mayron as Fran
- Michael Talbott as Sparrow

== Production ==
The film marked the directorial debut of Sam Irvin who had gained experience as Brian De Palma's production assistant. With his eye set on directing, Irvin developed Stiff, a comedy involving a dead body, with writer Brian Clemens whom Irvin had met during his tenure writing for fanzine Bizarre. Irvin found some of the financial backing from RCA/Columbia Home Video and was directed by them to seek the rest of the funding from I.R.S. Media. While I.R.S. ultimately passed due to having several other scripts further along in development, they did show Irvin a selection of scripts for him to potentially direct with the one that stood out being Guilty as Charged written by Charlie Gale (brother of Bob Gale). While the film was initially written as something more serious, I.R.S. wanted something comedic which they thought would blend well with Irvin's style as seen in his short film Double Negative.

== Reception ==
Leonard Maltin gave it two and a half stars.
