= Kim Won-kyu =

South Korean educator (1945–2013)

Kim, Won Kyu (died 1969) was a Korean educator who founded and was the first principal for what is now known as Seoul High School. His family originates from Hwanghae Province. He is survived by his youngest brother Pablo Jin Kyu Kim and his children. His granddaughter is Suzanne Whang.

- Feb 1 1946 Inauguration of the first principal Kim, Won Kyu

== Work ==
A tough yet supportive educator, Kim was known as the "Exam Czar" by the general Korean population and credited with Korea's modern entrance exam system by his former students.
