= Oblivion (1994 film) =

1994 space western by Sam Irvin

- VHS artwork
- Directed by: Sam Irvin
- Screenplay by: Peter David
- Story by: Charles Band; John Rheaume; Greg Suddeth; Mark Goldstein
- Produced by: Peter David; Oana Paunescu; Vlad Paunescu; Michael Catalano; Albert Band; Richard Band
- Starring: Richard Joseph Paul; Jackie Swanson; Andrew Divoff; George Takei; Julie Newmar; Isaac Hayes; Meg Foster
- Cinematography: Adolfo Bartoli
- Edited by: Margaret-Anne Smith
- Music by: Pino Donaggio
- Production company: Full Moon Entertainment
- Distributed by: Paramount Home Video
- Release date: December 14, 1994
- Running time: 94 minutes
- Countries: United States; Romania
- Language: English
- Budget: $2.5 million

Oblivion is a 1994 space Western film directed by Sam Irvin and written by Peter David from a story by Charles Band, John Rheaume, Greg Suddeth, and Mark Goldstein.

The film, starring Richard Joseph Paul, Andrew Divoff, George Takei, Julie Newmar, Musetta Vander, Isaac Hayes and Meg Foster, follows a sheriff's son who defends a futuristic Western town from a reptilian alien. Despite negative reviews, a sequel, Oblivion 2: Backlash, was released in 1996.

== Plot ==
Set in the year 3031 on a frontier planet light years away from Earth, a bizarre gang of futuristic desperadoes have their sight set on turning the tumbleweed town of Oblivion into their own private playground.

The action begins with the murder of the town's Marshal Stone by a power-hungry villain called Red Eye. Using a substance prized on the planet—which also happens to short out electrical devices—Red Eye cheats his way to victory during a showdown on the street, killing Stone and disabling his cyborg deputy, Stell. He and his cronies begin to bully and persuade the townspeople into allowing him to take over the town. Oblivion's mortician, Gaunt, who possesses supernatural ability to foresee death, seeks out the Marshal's son, Zack, who is prospecting in the wilderness.

Meanwhile, Zack saves a "native", Buteo, from an untimely death by giant scorpion. They team up just before Gaunt arrives with the news of Marshal Stone's death, and they all journey together to Oblivion for the funeral. During a misadventure in a saloon along the way, Zack avoids violence, even when harangued by one of Red Eye's henchmen. After attending his father's funeral, Zack visits his old friend Doc Valentine, an inventor whose technology had failed to protect the Marshal. At the local whorehouse, a townswoman, Mattie, learns that Zack is not a coward, but an empath, who feels everything that those around him experience. This leads him to abhor violence. Buteo learns that one of Red Eye's associates had been responsible for the deaths of his wife and children, and seeks revenge. Challenging him to a fair fight, Buteo triumphs and his opponent is killed. Red Eye and his gang capture Buteo in retaliation, place him in stocks, and whip him.

Sensing that something unsavoury is going on, Zack confronts his fears, saving Buteo and shooting many of the townspeople who had taken Red Eye's side. Apparently having won a victory, Zack celebrates until he learns that Mattie has been taken by Red Eye into the Badlands. He and his friends rush to save her, and in the process defeat all of the villains for good.

== Cast ==
- Richard Joseph Paul as Marshal Zack Stone
- Jackie Swanson as Mattie Chase
- Andrew Divoff as Red Eye
- Meg Foster as Stell Barr
- Musetta Vander as Lash
- Jimmie F. Skaggs as Buteo
- Isaac Hayes as Buster
- Sam Irvin as Whipping Boy
- Jeff Moldovan as Spanner
- Mike Genovese as Marshal Zed Stone, Zack's Father
- Tim Miller as Stinking Turncoat
- Peter David as Cowhand
- Frank Roman as Wormhole
- Irwin Keyes as Bork
- Carel Struycken as Mr. Gaunt
- George Takei as Doc Valentine
- Julie Newmar as Miss Kitty
- Nadine Emilie Voindrouh as Josephine

== Release ==
After quick runs at numerous film festivals, the film was released directly to videocassette by Paramount Home Video during the 1994 holiday season. In 2002, the film was released on DVD by Artisan Entertainment but was discontinued for reasons not given. The film has subsequently been re-released on DVD, by Full Moon Entertainment, in 2010, and on DVD again by Shout! Factory on July 5, 2011.

The movie was released digitally in September 2017 by movie mocking website RiffTrax.com featuring a humorous commentary by comedians Michael J. Nelson, Kevin Murphy, and Bill Corbett.

== Reception ==
Cinema Crazed found the film could be "silly and hard to follow, but it works well as a space western, and a western without the science fiction conventions." Joe Bob Briggs recommended "check it out."

Gone With The Twins website is quoted saying "Outside of the visuals, 'Oblivion' consists of ideas that could have been enjoyable if they weren't executed so poorly", and gave it a 3 out of 10 rating.
