= Jackie Swanson =

American actress (born 1963)

- Born: June 25, 1963 (age 63); Grand Rapids, Michigan
- Occupation: Actress
- Years active: 1987–present

Jackie Swanson (born June 25, 1963) is an American actress. She is best known for her role on the American sitcom Cheers as Kelly Gaines the rich, naïve love interest of Woody Boyd and as Amanda Hunsaker in the first Lethal Weapon movie.

== Early life, family and education ==
Jackie Swanson was born in Grand Rapids, Michigan. She is one of four children of high school sweethearts Scott B. and Ruth K. (née Lamb) Swanson: two other daughters, Becky and Lori; and a son, Peter. Becky, who died in 2011, was also one of Jackie's closest friends. The family resided in Cadillac, Michigan.

Jackie attended Northern Michigan University, but she left to pursue an acting career, much to her parents' chagrin.

== Career ==
In 1985, Swanson made her professional debut in the Prince music video "Raspberry Beret" as the girl wearing the raspberry-colored beret who hands Prince his guitar at the beginning of the song. She recalled being paid about $35 for the role. She and Prince remained friends. He wrote a song, "Palomino Pleasure Ride", for her. In 1987, Swanson made her feature debut in the opening scene of Lethal Weapon. She played Amanda Hunsaker, who falls to her death from a building onto the roof of a car. She performed this free-fall stunt from 35 ft (11 m) into an airbag under the training of stuntman Dar Robinson. Lethal Weapon would be Swanson's first time working with cinematographer Steven Goldblatt. She worked with Goldblatt again on Charlie Wilson's War.

In 1989, Swanson joined the cast of Cheers in the recurring role of Kelly Gaines, a pretty, wealthy, naïve, Lutheran young woman who would eventually marry Woody Boyd (played by Woody Harrelson). Her character was meant originally for one segment, but she continued to appear throughout the remainder of the series, which ended in 1993.

In 1991, she had a recurring role in the series Baby Talk. In 1992, Swanson appeared on the cover of TV Guide. She modeled in a runway show for Ralph Lauren.

In 2002, she appeared in an automotive TV commercial in which she is seen driving a GM vehicle to pick up her husband, who emerges from a submarine that pops through thick ice. She has appeared in a number of other national ad campaigns including commercials for: Broan (directed by Academy Award-winning director Joachim Back), Stacy's Pita Chips (directed by Christian Loubek), Orville Redenbacher (directed by Zach Math), Hummer (directed by Nick Lewin), Ford (directed by Eric Saarinen) and Toyota (directed by Jeff Karnoff) and in which she portrays the wife of a character played by Jim Belushi). Swanson also made a public service announcement for the Partnership for a Drug Free America/Anti-Meth Campaign (directed by Michael Patterson). She also was a stand-in for Gwyneth Paltrow for the feature film Contagion.

== Personal life ==
Swanson married Andrew Smith, a volleyball player. They resided in Pacific Palisades, California, in 2011, but by 2019 resided in Santa Monica, California.

She has been an avid runner and hiker.

On April 12, 2012, while driving, Swanson's vehicle was struck by a "'distracted' driver" which caused her car to flip and crash. She sustained a concussion and bruising and lacerations from broken glass, but she recovered.

After marrying Andrew Smith, Swanson brought up two children, making sure that creativity and education were woven into everyday family life.

== Filmography ==
- Lethal Weapon (1987) as Amanda Hunsaker
- Slam Dance (1987) as Mystery Girl (uncredited)
- It's Alive III: Island of the Alive (1987) as Tenant
- Less than Zero (1987) as Jandie (uncredited)
- The Charmings (1988, TV Series) as Candy
- Perfect Victims (1988) as Carrie Marks
- Almost Grown (1988, TV Series)
- She's the Sheriff (1989, TV Series) as Cherie
- Cheers (1989–1993, TV Series) as Kelly Susan Boyd-Gaines
- The People Next Door (1989, TV Series) as Debbie
- Dragnet (1990, TV Series) as Miss Carpen
- Baby Talk (1991, TV Series) as Stella
- The Golden Girls (1992, TV Series) as Tracy
- Oblivion (1994) as Mattie Chase
- Hope & Gloria (1995, TV Series) as Sister Theresa
- Oblivion 2: Backlash (1996) as Mattie Chase
- Artie (2000) as Dana Wilson
- NYPD Blue (2001, TV Series) as Trish Howlett
- Cold Case (2005, TV Series) as Sarah 1993
- Charlie Wilson's War (2007) as Texas Socialite (uncredited)
- Reality Inc (2011, TV Series) as Mrs. Blackburn
