= Sam Irvin =

American film director

- Sam Irvin in 2026
- Born: June 14, 1956 (age 70); Asheville, North Carolina
- Occupations: Film director, producer, screenwriter, actor

Sam Irvin (born June 14, 1956) is an American film and television director, producer, screenwriter, actor, author and film teacher.

Irvin's directing credits include Guilty as Charged, Oblivion, Elvira's Haunted Hills, and all the episodes of two television series: Dante's Cove and From Here on OUT. His other credits include co-executive producer of Bill Condon's Academy Award-winner Gods and Monsters; associate producer of Brian De Palma's Home Movies; and historical consultant on the Tony Award-winner Liza's at the Palace. Irvin authored the acclaimed biography Kay Thompson: From Funny Face to Eloise (Simon & Schuster), the children's book parody Sam's Toilet Paper Caper! (Knuckle Samwitch Books), and the novel ORBGASM: An Erotic Pulp Sci-Fi Satyricon (Knuckle Samwitch Books). Irvin has won two Rondo Awards for Best Article of the Year ("The Epic Saga Behind Frankenstein: The True Story" published in Little Shoppe of Horrors magazine #38) and Best Interview of the Year ("Elvira Exposed!" published in Screem magazine #36). Between projects, Irvin taught graduate courses on directing at the University of Southern California School of Cinematic Arts.

== Early life ==
Samuel Lowe Irvin, Jr. was born June 14, 1956, in Asheville, North Carolina. His grandfather, Warren Irvin, was the district manager for Wilby-Kincey Theaters, a chain of cinemas throughout the southeastern United States. His father, Sam Irvin Sr., co-owned Irvin-Fuller Theaters, a competing chain with cinemas in both North and South Carolina. Irvin worked in these theaters in his youth. Later, during his college years, he worked for Irvin-Fuller Theaters as its Advertising and Publicity Manager.

As a teenager, Irvin edited and published two issues of the fanzine Pit (69-70), and four annual issues of Bizarre (1972–1975), a fanzine on fantasy, horror and science fiction films, for which he twice traveled to England to conduct in-person interviews, including Christopher Lee, Peter Cushing, Vincent Price, Diana Rigg, Jane Seymour, Joan Collins, Terence Fisher, Freddie Francis, Sir James Carreras, Michael Carreras, etc.

In 1978, Irvin graduated from the University of South Carolina with a Bachelor of Arts in Media Arts. While attending the university, he was the film critic for The Gamecock, the campus newspaper, and won a student film award for his thesis short film. He was also chairman of the University of South Carolina Film Committee that ran a year-round cinema program at the campus theater.

== Career ==
During his summer break in 1977, Irvin interned at the Chicago shooting location for Brian De Palma’s The Fury. He worked on the feature as a production assistant, an extra, and also wrote a journal on the making of the movie that was published in Cinefantastique magazine, Vol. 7, No. 2, 1978. Irvin also conducted an exclusive interview with Amy Irving in which, for the first time anywhere, she discussed her relationship with Steven Spielberg; it was published in Cinefantastique, Vol 6, No. 4 / Vol. 7, No. 1, 1978.

In 2013, Irvin was extensively interviewed on camera by filmmaker Robert Fischer about his experiences on the set of The Fury for The Fury: A Location Journal, a 50-minute bonus feature that is included on the 2013 Blu-ray DVD release of The Fury distributed by Arrow Films in the U.K. and Ireland and by Carlotta Films in France. In its October 26, 2013 issue, Telegraph Magazine (the weekly supplement to London's popular daily newspaper The Telegraph) ran a full-page story and photo of Irvin reminiscing about his time on the set of The Fury.

After graduating from the University of South Carolina in May 1978, Irvin worked as the Associate Producer and Production Manager on Brian De Palma's Home Movies. Then, Irvin worked as De Palma's assistant on Dressed to Kill starring Michael Caine, Angie Dickinson, Nancy Allen and Keith Gordon. He also worked with De Palma on several projects in development, including Blow Out.

Irvin wrote a comprehensive, 13,000-word chronicle on the making of Dressed to Kill for Boobs and Blood magazine (fundraising for the Keep a Breast Foundation), issue number 4, published in December 2020. The entire issue was devoted to Irvin's article.

Irvin gave up his position as De Palma's assistant to produce The First Time, a coming-of-age comedy co-written by William Finley, for which De Palma served as a credited Creative Consultant. Released by New Line Cinema, the film starred Tim Choate, Wendie Jo Sperber, Wallace Shawn, Cathryn Damon and Jane Badler.

During the 1980s, Irvin served as Vice President of Marketing for three film distributors: United Artists Classics, Spectrafilm, and Vestron. During this period, Irvin won The Hollywood Reporter Key Art Awards for designing the movie posters for François Truffaut’s Confidentially Yours and Paul Verhoeven’s The Fourth Man. He also helped spearhead the record-breaking year-long run of Jean-Jacques Beineix's Diva in New York City.

Irvin's first directorial effort, which he also wrote and produced, was the 1985 dark comedy short Double Negative, which starred Bill Randolph, Justin Henry, Wayne Knight, Dori Legg, and William Finley. It premiered as an official selection at the Sundance Film Festival and subsequently played theatrically in New York and Los Angeles as a warm-up for various feature films. It was nominated for a Gold Hugo Award for Best Short Film at the 1985 Chicago International Film Festival. Janet Maslin of The New York Times wrote that it was "an exceptionally promising first effort." Double Negative is included as an extra bonus feature on the 2013 Blu-ray DVD release of Brian DePalma's The Fury distributed by Arrow Films in the U.K. and Ireland and by Carlotta Films in France.

Irvin went on to direct many feature films, including:

- Guilty as Charged starring Rod Steiger, Lauren Hutton, Heather Graham, and Isaac Hayes. (The film won the Gold Special Jury Award for Best Independent Feature at Houston Worldfest.)
- Out There a Showtime Original Movie starring Billy Campbell, Billy Bob Thornton, Rod Steiger, Jill St. John, Paul Dooley, Robert Picardo, David Rasche, Bill Cobbs, and Julie Brown.
- Acting on Impulse a Showtime Original Movie starring C. Thomas Howell, Linda Fiorentino, Nancy Allen, Paul Bartel, Mary Woronov, Isaac Hayes, and Cassandra Peterson.
- Fat Rose and Squeaky a Showtime Original Movie starring Louise Fletcher, Cicely Tyson, Julie Brown and Lea DeLaria.
- A Very Cool Christmas starring George Hamilton and Donna Mills.
- Deadly Skies starring Antonio Sabato Jr., Rae Dawn Chong and Michael Moriarty.
- Elvira's Haunted Hills starring Cassandra Peterson as Elvira, Mistress of the Dark, and Richard O'Brien. (The film won the Audience Award at the 2002 Provincetown International Film Festival.)
- My Santa starring Samaire Armstrong, Matthew Lawrence, Julie Brown, Jim O'Heir, Channing Chase, Ben Gavin, and Paul Dooley.
- Fatal Acquittal a Lifetime original movie starring Joely Fisher, Denise Richards, Patrick Muldoon, Debra Wilson, and Jim O'Heir.
- Naughty and Nice starring Haylie Duff, Tilky Jones, Maureen McCormick, Jim O'Heir, Eric Peterson, Tyler Jacob Moore, C.J. Hoff. (On November 6, 2014, critic Neil Genzlinger wrote in The New York Times that Naughty & Nice was "the best" of the season's new Christmas movies.)
- Mothers of the Bride starring Gail O'Grady, Betsy Brandt, Julie Brown, Debra Wilson, Daniela Bobadilla, Carolyn Hennesy, Scott Atkinson. Irvin also wrote the lyrics and co-wrote the music (with Al Sgro) for a song featured in the movie called "Partay at the Soirée", sung by Debra Wilson.
- The Nurse starring Willa Ford, Brigid Brannagh, John Heard, Costas Mandylor, Jack Noseworthy, David Millbern, T.J. Hoban.
- I'm Not Ready for Christmas starring Alicia Witt, George Stults, Brigid Brannagh, Maxwell Caulfield, and Dan Lauria. A Hallmark Channel premiere movie.
- Christmas Land starring Nikki DeLoach, Luke Macfarlane, Jason-Shane Scott, Richard Karn, Cynthia Gibb, Chonda Pierce and Maureen McCormick. A Hallmark Channel premiere movie which was the Number One most-watched cable television show (all channels) on the night it aired, with 4.244 million viewers, one of the most-watched programs on Hallmark during all of 2015.
- The Wrong House a Lifetime original movie starring Clare Kramer, Tilky Jones, Allison McAtee, Thomas Calabro, Jim O'Heir, Carolyn Hennesy, Keiko Agena, Ashlyn Jade Lopez, Scott Atkinson and Dori Legg. Aside from directing, Irvin was also one of the writers.
- Open Marriage a Lifetime original movie starring Tilky Jones, Nikki Leigh, Kelly Dowdle, Jason Tobias and Debra Wilson.
- The Wrong Neighbor starring Andrea Bogart, Steve Richard Harris, Cristine Prosperi, Ashlynn Yennie, Michael Madsen, Dominic Leeder, James Gaisford and Brian Nolan.
- My Christmas Prince starring Alexis Knapp, Callum Alexander, Pamela Sue Martin, Parker Stevenson, Marina Sirtis, Jane Carr, Charles Shaughnessy, Catriona Toop, Brad Benedict and Chelsea Gilson.
- Hidden Family Secrets aka Hidden Family Secrets starring Diora Baird, Blanche Baker and Abbie Gayle.
- Homecoming Revenge starring April Bowlby, Kim Director and Abbie Gayle.
- Seduced by My Neighbor starring Andrea Bogart, Trevor St. John, Rocky Myers, Sierra McCormick and Beth Broderick.
- Pretty Little Stalker starring Ashley Pickards, Nicky Whelan, Jesse Hutch and Sierra McCormick.
- Christmas Made to Order starring Alexa PenaVega, Jonathan Bennett and Jo Marie Payton.
- Madam of Purity Falls starring Olivia d'Abo, Kristanna Loken, Trevor Stines and Beth Broderick.
- Sister of the Bride starring Becca Tobin, Ryan Rottman, Michael Gross, Beth Broderick and Tilky Jones.
- Check Inn to Christmas starring Rachel Boston, Wes Brown, Richard Karn and Tim Reid.
- Engaged to a Psycho starring Anna Hutchison, Audrey Landers, Melissa Bolona and Jason-Shane Scott.
- Mile High Escorts starring Christina Moore, Saxon Sharbino, Gary Weeks, Steve Coulter, Adam Huss, Griffin Freeman and Esteban Benito.

From his own original screenplay, Irvin directed the Showtime Original Movie Kiss of a Stranger starring Mariel Hemingway, Dyan Cannon, Corbin Bernsen and David Carradine.

Irvin directed the cult sci-fi westerns Oblivion and its sequel Backlash: Oblivion 2 starring Julie Newmar, George Takei, Isaac Hayes, Meg Foster and Maxwell Caulfield. (Oblivion won the Gold Award for Best Fantasy / Science Fiction Feature at Houston Worldfest.)

He also directed the Disney Channel time-travel pirate fantasy Magic Island starring Zachery Ty Bryan and French Stewart.

For television, Irvin directed several episodes of Comedy Central's Strip Mall starring Julie Brown, Cindy Williams, Jim O'Heir, Carolyn Hennesy, Maxwell Caulfield, and Stella Stevens.

Irvin directed all the episodes of the hit television series Dante's Cove starring Tracy Scoggins, Charlie David, Jenny Shimizu, Thea Gill, Stephen Amell, Booboo Stewart, and Reichen Lehmkuhl. (Irvin also wrote the lyrics and co-composed the music for the series' international hit theme song, "Dying to Be with You").

Irvin was the sole director and co-producer of the comedy series From Here on OUT starring Terry Ray, T. J. Hoban, Juliet Mills, Suzanne Whang, and Julie Brown. Additionally, Irvin wrote the lyrics and co-composed the music for the series' theme song "From Here on OUT".

Irvin was also the first season director and co-producer of the television series My Sister Is So Gay starring Terry Ray, Wendy Michaels, Tilky Jones, Debra Wilson, and Loni Anderson.

Also for television, Irvin directed the opening of The 100th Anniversary of the World Series (October 18, 2003) for the Fox Network (a "through the ages" montage featuring the music of and starring Sheila E).

Irvin directed several segments for the Fox Network's 2005 Super Bowl XXXIX including several comedy sketches starring Eugene Levy as a nutty gadget inventor trying to improve the entertainment value of football. Other vignettes included Will Smith, Drew Barrymore, and Jimmy Fallon. Irvin also directed the surrealistic opening battle between ninja warriors and football players.

And for the Fox Network opening of the 2007 Allstate Sugar Bowl, Irvin directed "Dueling Musicians" shot on the streets of New Orleans (broadcast January 3, 2007).

After directing several American-financed films in Romania, Irvin was invited by Romanian-based Mediapro Studios to direct Garcea si olteni, a spin-off of Romania's most popular television show, starring a Monty Python-like sketch comedy group known as Vacante Mare. It became the highest grossing motion picture in Romanian history up to that time, beating the previous record-holder, James Cameron's Titanic.

Also in Romania, Irvin directed Am să mă întorc bărbat (I Will Return A Man), a rock opera performed by the Romanian rock group Vama Veche broadcast live on television from the National Theater in Bucharest. It was an anti-war musical in the same genre as Pink Floyd's The Wall.

His credits as a producer include:

- Associate producing Brian De Palma's Home Movies starring Kirk Douglas, Nancy Allen and Keith Gordon. (Irvin also served as Production Manager.)
- Co-executive producing Bill Condon's Academy Award-winning film Gods and Monsters starring Sir Ian McKellen, Brendan Fraser and Lynn Redgrave. (Irvin also co-directed the "Making of" documentary for the DVD, entitled The World of Gods and Monsters: A Journey with James Whale.)
- Co-producing Greg Berlanti's The Broken Hearts Club: A Romantic Comedy starring Timothy Olyphant, Dean Cain, Zach Braff, John Mahoney, Nia Long and Justin Theroux.
- Co-executive producing Bob Clark's I'll Remember April starring Haley Joel Osment, Pat Morita, Mark Harmon, Pam Dawber and Paul Dooley. (Irvin also was the second-unit director.)
- Co-executive producing Big Monster on Campus (aka Boltneck: Teen Frankenstein) starring Ryan Reynolds, Shelley Duvall, Matthew Lawrence and Judge Reinhold.
- Associate producing The Mating Habits of the Earthbound Human starring Mackenzie Astin, David Hyde Pierce, Carmen Electra and Lucy Liu.
- Co-producing Error in Judgment starring Joanna Pacula, Joe Mantegna, Kate Jackson and Paul Dooley.
- Co-producing When Time Expires starring Richard Grieco, Mark Hamill and Chad Everett.
- Associate producing Sticky Fingers starring Helen Slater, Melanie Mayron, Eileen Brennan, Carol Kane, Christopher Guest, Danitra Vance, and Loretta Devine.
- Executive producing Too Outrageous! (1987) starring Craig Russell.
- Associate producing Staging Christmas starring Soleil Moon Frye, George Stults and Jalael White.
- Producing The First Time starring Tim Choate, Wendie Jo Sperber, Wallace Shawn, Cathryn Damon and Jane Badler. Creative Consultant: Brian De Palma.

Irvin's first book, Kay Thompson: From Funny Face to Eloise, was published by Simon & Schuster (November 2010) and was honored by Kirkus Reviews and The Theatre Library Association Awards as one of the "Best Biographies of 2010." Acclaimed by columnist Liz Smith as "a smashing work," and by entertainer Michael Feinstein as "one of the best showbiz bios I've ever read." This comprehensive biography covers the life and career of the legendary singer-actress-composer-arranger-author-fashionista Kay Thompson. She was the mentor/best friend of Judy Garland, the vocal guru to Frank Sinatra and Lena Horne, the mentor and longtime lover of Andy Williams, and the godmother/Svengali to Liza Minnelli (who recreated Thompson's nightclub act in the 2009 Tony Award-winning event Liza's at the Palace).

In connection with his research on the life of Thompson, Irvin served as a historical consultant on the Tony Award-winning Broadway event Liza's at the Palace. He produced and annotated the 2009 3-CD box set compilation Think Pink! A Kay Thompson Party (Sepia Records) and he appeared in and consulted on Paramount Home Entertainment's documentary Kay Thompson: Think Pink! (an extra included in Paramount's Centennial Collection DVD edition of Stanley Donen's Funny Face starring Audrey Hepburn, Fred Astaire, and Kay Thompson).

Irvin was the Guest Editor of a special issue of Little Shoppe of Horrors No. 38 focusing on the making of Frankenstein: The True Story, published June 2017, including Irvin's 50,000-word chronicle on the movie which won the 2017 Rondo Hatton Classic Horror Award for Best Article of the Year. The magazine also included Irvin's exclusive interviews with Leonard Whiting, Jane Seymour, David McCallum, Nicola Pagett, Don Bachardy, among many others. The issue also features an exclusive never-before-published essay on the writing of the movie by the late Christopher Isherwood and his partner Don Bachardy. Irvin also arranged for a special Foreword by best-selling author Anne Rice and an essay by Mark Gatiss, the co-creator of Sherlock.

Subsequently, Irvin did all the special features for Shout! Factory's 2020 Blu-ray release of Frankenstein: The True Story—including a three-hour audio commentary plus newly-filmed interviews with Jane Seymour, Leonard Whiting and co-screenwriter Don Bachardy.

As a noted expert on the career of Vincent Price, Irvin appears as an on-camera authority in Constantine Nasr's 2013 documentary House of Wax: Unlike Anything You've Ever Seen, also featuring exclusive on-camera interviews with Martin Scorsese, Joe Dante, Wes Craven, Rick Baker, and Victoria Price. The 48-minute documentary is featured as an extra on Warner Home Video's 2013 3D Blu-ray edition of House of Wax (1953) starring Vincent Price.

Irvin also won a second Rondo Award for Best Interview of the Year for "Elvira Exposed!", an in-depth interview with Cassandra Peterson published in Screem magazine #36 in 2018.

Between projects, Irvin has served as an adjunct faculty member at the University of Southern California School of Cinematic Arts where he taught graduate courses on directing. Among his former students is Ryan Coogler, writer-director of Fruitvale Station, winner of the Grand Jury Prize and Audience Award at the 2013 Sundance Film Festival, as well as the Un Certain Regard award at the 2013 Cannes Film Festival. Coogler has since directed Creed starring Michael B. Jordan and Sylvester Stallone; and the Marvel superhero movie Black Panther.

Most recently, Irvin authored Sam's Toilet Paper Caper!, a children's book parody, illustrated by Dan Gallagher. The book was inspired by Irvin's own real-life quest to find toilet paper during the 2020 pandemic paper panic. Drenched in movie references from The Sound of Music to Carrie, the grocery store clerk is a dead ringer for Peter Lorre. Published by Irvin's own imprint, Knuckle Samwitch Books, it is available in paperback and ebook on Amazon.com. All profits from the sales of the book are being donated to the World Health Organization's COVID-19 Solidarity Response Fund.

Irvin also authored the novel ORBGASM: An Erotic Pulp Sci-Fi Satyricon, published by Irvin's own imprint, Knuckle Samwitch Books, available in paperback and ebook on Amazon.com. All profits from the sales of the book are being donated to the World Health Organization's COVID-19 Solidarity Response Fund.

== Personal life ==
Irvin resides in Los Angeles with Gary Bowers, his partner since 1982. They married August 12, 2016.

== Filmography ==
=== As director ===
- Double Negative (1985) short film
- Guilty as Charged (1991)
- Acting on Impulse (1993) (TV)
- Oblivion (1994)
- Out There (1995) (TV)
- Magic Island (1995) (V)
- Backlash: Oblivion 2 (1996)
- Kiss of a Stranger (1999)
- The World of Gods and Monsters: A Journey with James Whale (1999) (V)
- Strip Mall (2000) (TV series)
- Elvira's Haunted Hills (2001)
- Garcea si olteni (2001)
- Am să mă întorc bărbat (I Will Return a Man) (2002) (TV)
- A Very Cool Christmas (2004) (TV) aka Too Cool for Christmas
- Deadly Skies (2005) (TV) aka Force of Impact
- Fat Rose and Squeaky (2006)
- Dante's Cove (12 episodes, 2005–2007) (TV)
- My Santa (2013) (TV)
- From Here on OUT (2014) (TV series)
- Fatal Acquittal (2014) (TV)
- Naughty and Nice (2014) (TV) aka Christmas Mix (2015) (DVD)
- Mothers of the Bride (2015) (TV)
- The Nurse (2015) (TV)
- I'm Not Ready for Christmas (2015) (TV)
- Christmas Land (2015) (TV)
- My Sister Is So Gay (2016) (TV series)
- The Wrong House (2016) (TV)
- Open Marriage (2017) (TV)
- The Wrong Neighbor (2017) (TV)
- My Christmas Prince (2017) (TV)
- Homecoming Revenge (2018) (TV)
- Seduced by My Neighbor (2018) (TV)
- Hidden Family Secrets (2018) (TV)
- Pretty Little Stalker (2018) (TV)
- Christmas Made to Order (2018) (TV)
- Madam of Purity Falls (2019) (TV)
- Sister of the Bride (2019) (TV)
- Check Inn to Christmas (2019) (TV)
- Engaged to a Psycho (2020) (TV)
- Mile High Escorts (2020) (TV)

=== As producer ===
- Home Movies (1979)
- The First Time (1983)
- Double Negative (1985)
- Too Outrageous! (1987)
- Sticky Fingers (1988)
- When Time Expires (1997) (TV)
- Error in Judgment (1998)
- Gods and Monsters (1998)
- The World of Gods and Monsters: A Journey with James Whale (1999) (V)
- I'll Remember April (1999)
- Ancient Evil: Scream of the Mummy (1999)
- The Mating Habits of the Earthbound Human (1999)
- The Broken Hearts Club: A Romantic Comedy (2000)
- Big Monster on Campus (2000) aka Boltneck: Teen Frankenstein
- Defending the Super$ave (2001)
- Just Can't Get Enough (2001)
- From Here on OUT (2014) (TV series)
- The Nurse (2015) (TV)
- My Sister Is So Gay (2016) (TV series)
- Staging Christmas (2019) (TV)

=== As actor ===
- Guilty as Charged (1991)
- Oblivion (1994)
- Magic Island (1995) (V)
- Backlash: Oblivion 2 (1996)
- Garcea si oltenii (2001)
- Dante's Cove (1 episode, 2005) (TV)
- Fatal Acquittal (2014) (TV)
- Naughty and Nice (2014) (TV)
- Mothers of the Bride (2015) (TV)

=== As writer ===
- Double Negative (1985)
- Sweet Deception (1998) (TV)
- Kiss of a Stranger (1999)
- A Christmas Reunion (2015) (TV)
- The Wrong House (2016) (TV)

=== As author ===
- Kay Thompson: From Funny Face to Eloise (published by Simon & Schuster, 2010)
- Sam's Toilet Paper Caper! (published by Knuckle Samwitch Books, 2020)
- ORBGASM: An Erotic Pulp Sci-Fi Satyricon (published by Knuckle Samwitch Books, 2020)

=== As guest editor ===
- Little Shoppe of Horrors No. 38 on the making of Frankenstein: The True Story published by Richard Klemensen, June 2017. The Epic Untold Saga Behind Frankenstein: The True Story by Sam Irvin won the 2017 Rondo Hatton Classic Horror Award for Best Article of the Year.
