= Lee Shi-yoon =

South Korean lawyer and judge (1935–2024)

- 이시윤

Justice of the Constitutional Court of Korea
- In office 15 September 1988 – 17 December 1993
- Preceded by: position established
- Succeeded by: Lee Jae-hwa

Personal details
- Born: 10 October 1935 Keijō, Korea, Japan
- Died: 9 November 2024 (aged 89) Seoul, South Korea
- Education: Seoul National University
- Occupation: Lawyer; Judge

Lee Shi-yoon (Korean: 이시윤; 10 October 1935 – 9 November 2024) was a South Korean lawyer and judge. He served as a justice of the Constitutional Court from 1988 to 1993.

== Life and career ==
Lee was born in Keijō (modern-day Seoul) in 1935. He graduated from Seoul High School and the Seoul National University School of Law.

In 1988, Lee was appointed as a justice of the newly created Constitutional Court of Korea. Lee studied the German system of constitutional adjudication of the German Federal Constitutional Court and wrote a series of articles called "Personal Views on Constitutional Justice".

Lee died at Severance Hospital on November 9, 2024, at the age of 89.

== Brief history ==
- Born in Seoul on October 10, 1935
- He graduated from the Faculty of Law, Seoul National University, in 1958 and passed the military service examination.
- Lecturer at Seoul National University Faculty of Law, Graduate School of Law 1962,Seoul National University, Kookmin University, Kukje University, and Ewha Womans University
- Seoul District Court Judge 1962.
- Seoul Civil Court Judge, 1963
- Assistant Professor, Seoul National University School of Law and Graduate School of Judicial Studies, 1964
- Acting Seoul High Court Judge 1970
- Seoul High Court Judge 1973
- Research Judge of the Supreme Court in 1974
- 1975 Chief Justice of the Seoul Civil District Court and Professor at the Judicial Research and Training Institute
- Chief Justice of the Gwangju High Court, 1981
- Chief Justice of the Seoul High Court, 1982
- Chief Judge of Chuncheon District Court in 1987
- Chief Judge of the Suwon District Court and Permanent Judge of the Constitutional Court in 1988
- 16th Chairman of the Audit and Inspection Board in 1993
- He opened a law firm in 1998 and became a professor at Myongji University.
- President of the Civil Law Society in 1998
- Chairman of the Special Committee for the Review of the Civil code, Ministry of Justice, 1999
- Professor, Faculty of Law, Kyung Hee University, 2000
- 2006 Consultant Attorney at Deryon Law Firm.
