= 30 Years from Here =

- Official Key Art
- Directed by: Josh Rosenzweig
- Composer: Nell Balaban
- Country of origin: United States
- Original language: English

Production
- Executive producers: Paul Colichman; Stephen P. Jarchow
- Producers: Eric Feldman; Josh Rosenzweig
- Running time: 60 minutes
- Production company: Here Media

Original release
- Network: here!
- Release: November 25, 2011

30 Years From Here is an American television documentary about the 30 years war on the HIV and AIDS pandemic. The documentary was directed by Josh Rosenzweig for the LGBT cable network here!. The documentary debuted on November 25, 2011.

In 2012 30 Years From Here was nominated for a Daytime Emmy Award by the National Academy of Television Arts & Sciences.

== Premise ==
30 Years From Here examines the trials and tribulations the AIDS pandemic has created over the past 30 years. The documentary looks at how the nondiscriminatory disease has affected many lives over many years. The documentary features personal accounts from people who were there in the beginning and have seen both the sorrow over lives lost and the hope generated by advances in medical research. Activists, medical experts, and people who were on the ground describe their stories from the war on AIDS.

== Cast ==
- Terrence McNally
- Larry Kramer
- Marjorie Hill
- Frank Spinelli
- Jerry Mitchell
- Larry Flick
- Demetre Daskalakis, M.D.
- Anthony Donovan
- David Drake
- Regan Hofmann
- John Knoebel
- Danny Logan
- Larry Mass, M.D.
- Dvorah Stohl
- Krishna Stone
- Sean Strub
