= Mai bună ca niciodată =

Studio album by Oana
- Released: 28 June 2007
- Studio: Korekt Studio
- Length: 35:07
- Language: Romanian; English; Spanish
- Label: Roton; Sincron
- Producer: Adrian Cristescu

Mai bună ca niciodată (Romanian: Better than Ever) is the only studio album recorded by Romanian actress, television host and singer Oana Zăvoranu under her mononym Oana. It was released on 28 June 2007 by Roton and Sincron. Zăvoranu had gained significant popularity in her native country in the early 2000s for her acting roles, but took a hiatus in 2006 to focus on a music career and parted ways with the television production company Media Pro.

Mai bună ca niciodată features production by Adrian Cristescu, who was also a contributing songwriter along with Georgiana Ariton, Sabina Cojocar, Dan Lazăr and Silviu Păduraru. "Pusă pe fapte" and "Cariño" featuring Cristescu under his stage name Adi Korekt were selected as singles to support the album, with the latter receiving an accompanying music video and peaking at number 99 on the Romanian Top 100 chart.

== Background and release ==
Oana Zăvoranu is a Romanian actress, television host and singer. She gained widespread national popularity throughout the early 2000s after starring in several sitcoms, movies and soap operas, most notably Numai iubirea (Only the Love) and Păcatele Evei (Eva's Sins). In March 2006, Zăvoranu announced that she had parted ways with the television production company Media Pro and taken a hiatus from acting to focus on a music career. Guided by composer Marius Moga, vocal coach Crina Mărdare and her manager Joey d'Alvare, she had been working on her debut studio album for over a year.

Mai bună ca niciodată was eventually released by Roton and distributed by Sincron on 28 June 2007, going on to sell "beyond expectations" according to Zăvoranu. She performed all of the album's songs at its release party at the Paradiso club in Bucharest. Mai bună ca niciodată contains 10 tracks, which were composed by Georgiana Ariton, Sabina Cojocar, Adrian Cristescu, Dan Lazăr and Silviu Păduraru. The songs were recorded, mixed and mastered at Cristescu's Korekt Studio, with some of them featuring the contributions of Marian Bulacu and Petruț Remus on saxophone and guitar, respectively. Cristescu charged Zăvoranu €7,000 for the production of Mai bună ca niciodată, with the costs for each song amounting to €700. The album cover was shot by Marius Bărăgan, while the make-up was done by Narcisa Simadan, the hairstyling by Cristina Gheorghe and the outfit brought by Zăvoranu.

== Singles and music videos ==
Mai bună ca niciodată was preceded by the release of two singles—"Pusă pe fapte" (Put to Action), and "Cariño" (Dear) featuring Cristescu under his stage name Adi Korekt. A music video for the former was directed by Marian Crișan and had a budget of €15,000, but was scrapped after creative and personal disputes between Crișan and Zăvoranu; Crișan was hesitant about Zăvoranu's wish for the music video to feature her cat Marty and several press people. The visual has since been leaked online. Petre Năstase directed the music video for "Cariño", which was premiered on the Romanian television show TeoViziunea and whose budget was €11,000. It was filmed in Snagov, Romania, on the same Western and Texas-inspired set that had been used for the production of the 2003 war film Cold Mountain. The clip featured Marty alongside cowboys and old-looking police cars, fire engines and motorcycles. Zăvoranu wore make-up applied by Alexandru Abagiu in a span of two hours. "Cariño" went on to reach number 99 on the Romanian Top 100.

== Track listing ==
Mai bună ca niciodată
No.	Title	Length
1.	"Cariño" (featuring Adi Korekt)	3:44
2.	"Pusă pe fapte"	3:26
3.	"Ai inima"	3:26
4.	"Am găsit la tine dragostea" (featuring Adi Korekt)	4:15
5.	"Lumea mă iubește"	3:11
6.	"Cine te crezi"	3:18
7.	"Cu sufletul nu știu să mint"	3:15
8.	"Eu pot trișa" (featuring Adi Korekt)	3:28
9.	"Tu…"	3:28
10.	"Fantezia ta"	3:36
Total length:		35:07
