= For & Against =

- For & Against
- Created by: Jim Morrison, Josh Rosenzweig
- Written by: Jim Morrison
- Directed by: Josh Rosenzweig
- Starring: Jim Morrison
- Country of origin: United States
- Original language: English
- No. of seasons: 1
- No. of episodes: 24

Production
- Executive producers: Paul Colichman; Stephen P. Jarchow
- Running time: 30 minutes
- Production company: Here Media, Inc.

Original release
- Network: here!
- Release: January 6, 2012 – present

For & Against is an American talk show hosted by Jim Morrison that currently airs on the LGBTQ channel Here TV. Each episode features Morrison discussing issues that affect the LGBT community and interviewing interviews policymakers and pundits of various political persuasions. The show provides news and headlines from an LGBT perspective. For & Against premiered on January 6, 2012.

Here TV (also known as Here! or stylized as here!) is producing 24 episodes for season one, however the last and 11th episode aired on June 8, 2012.

In 2012 it was announced that episodes of For & Against will be made available on online video service Hulu.

== Premise ==
Progressive commentator Jim Morrison hosts a political talk show series. Speaking directly to the LGBTQ population about politics, politicians, and policies, For & Against explores headlines through an LGBTQ lens.

Each episode features Morrison digging deeper into topical issues, ranging from campaign financing to current and future White House policy directly affecting the LGBT community. Additionally, Morrison sits down with policymakers and pundits to discuss the issues that influence LGBTQ voters.

== Cast ==
=== Main cast ===
- Jim Morrison is the host.

=== Guests ===
- Evan Wolfson
- Regan Hofmann
- Sean Strub
- Fred Karger
