= George Papagheorghe =

Romanian singer, dancer and TV host (born 1982)

George Papagheorghe (JORGE)
- Born: George Papagheorghe; June 22, 1982 (age 44); Constanța, România
- Origin: Constanța
- Genres: Pop; Popcorn; Dancehall; Dance; Opera
- Occupations: Singer, tv host, model
- Instrument: Voice
- Years active: 2002–present
- Labels: Cat Music, UMG, Roton, Media Pro Music

George Papagheorghe (born 22 June 1982, in Constanța) a.k.a. Jorge and at times GEØRGE is a Romanian singer, dancer and TV host, specially for the talent competition România dansează on Antena 1 starting 2013.

== Career ==
=== Beginnings ===
George Papagheorghe was born in Constanța on the Black Sea in an artistic family. His father was a well known celebrity performing in social gatherings, bars and at weddings in Macedonia. He performed at school while 11 in classical opera pieces accompanied by piano. After graduation, he specialized in management at Academia de Studii Economice in Bucarest.

== Musical career ==
=== In band Cocktail ===
He was cast by Media Pro Music when he was 20 to be in a musical band called Cocktail in 2002 with other members being Mihai Dăscălescu, Sandrina Agape, Raluca Coman, și Teodora Vasu and in 2003 took his band to the Romanian version of Popstars broadcast on Pro TV. They won the series with their song "Până-n zori" collecting 212 points. The band released the self-titled album Cocktail with the hit "Ei și ce" gaining them more popularity. The band also released the hit "Lumea-i a mea". and "Prietenii". The album was produced by Bogdan Popoiag, Dan Griober and Marius Moga. But facing financial difficulties and unstable political conditions in Romania, Cocktail folded in 2005.

=== Stage and acting career ===
In 2007–2008 he appeared in the stage production "Micul Paris" with Aurelian Temișan and Maria Buză and in the show "3007-Terra Maimuțelor" at Circul Globus theatre. He collaborated with the blind Romanian singer star George Nicolescu having a charting hit "Îndrăgostit" in 2008. In April 2009, he took part in an operatic role in a musical version of Romeo and Juliet in partnership production between Budapest State Opera and Bucharest-based Theater National Operetta "Ion Dacian". Papagheorghe had the lead role as Romeo and Simona Nae the lead role as Juliet. He also made voice-overs in Romanian with Disney films like in the role of Flynn Rider in O poveste încâlcită (Tangled in English) (2010) and in Regatul de gheață (Romanian version of Frozen, 2013).

=== Solo music career ===
In 2014, he had a major hit with "Nu ne potrivim" featuring CRBL. In 2015 he had another hit "Nimeni nu-i perfect" featuring singer JO. This was followed by "Detector de minciuni" featuring Amna in 2016.

=== Television career ===
With the demise of Cocktail in 2005, Papagheorghe moved to television presenting Fete de gașcă on Euforia TV. He also took part in the Romanian dance competition Dansez pentru tine without making it to the final.

In 2010, he was offered by channel Antena 1, to co-present with Alina Crișan, a former member of the band ASIA, in a musical competition show Cântă dacă poți! (meaning Sing if you can!) which followed 8 competitors, in groups of two, competing in four rounds to win the title.

He appeared in Te cunosc de undeva! (the Romanian version of Your Face Sounds Familiar) in the first 2 seasons of the show in 2012 and 2013 winning season 2.

Papagheorghe is best known however for hosting the danse show România dansează on Antena 1. In 2017 he hosted the emission Super Potriveala on Kanal D Romania.

== Discography ==
=== Albums ===
As part of Cocktail

| Year | Album | Peak position |
|---|---|---|
| 2003 | Cocktail | 2 |

=== Singles ===
In band Cocktail

- "Până-n zori"
- "Ei și ce"
- "Lumea-i a mea"
- "Prietenii"

Solo

| Year | Title | Peak positions | Album |
|---|---|---|---|
| 2008 | "Îndrăgostit" (feat. George Nicolescu) | 28 | Niciun |
| 2013 | "Geamantan" (with Pavel Stratan) | 14 | |
| 2014 | "Nu ne potrivim deloc" (with CRBL) | | |
| 2016 | "Detector de minciuni" (feat. Amna) | | |
| 2017 | "Podul de piatra" | | |
| 2018 | "Iarta-ma" | | |
| 2019 | "Spumele Marii" | | |

== Filmography ==
Film
| Year | Title | Role | Note |
|---|---|---|---|
| 2010 | O poveste încâlcită (Romanian version of Tangled) | Flynn Rider (voice in Romanian version) | Animated film |
| 2011 | Regatul de gheață (Romanian version of Frozen) | Prince Hans (voice in Romanian version) | Animated film |

- 2016– Trolls- Branch (Romanian version)
