= Nadine Voindrouh =

Romanian actor and singer (born 1977)

- Born: Nadine Emilie Voindrouh; February 24, 1977 (age 49); Bucharest, Romania
- Occupations: Singer, actress, television presenter
- Notable work: Școala Vedetelor on TVR 1, Vorbeşte lumea on Pro TV
- Spouse: Dragoş Apostolescu
- Children: 1

Nadine Emilie Voindrouh or simply Nadine (born February 24, 1977) is a Romanian singer, actress and television presenter. She is of Congolese descent through her father.

She was born in Bucharest to a Romanian mother who died when she was young and a Congolese father, whom she never met.

Nadine was orphaned when she was only six years old, and lived in an orphanage. She lived in the United States seven years.

== Filmography ==
Film
Year	Title	Role
1994	Oblivion	Josephine
1996	Oblivion 2: Backlash	Josephine
