= Jennifer Echols =

American writer

- Occupation: American writer
- Notable work: Major Crush
- Website: jennifer-echols.com

Jennifer Echols is an American writer of romantic fiction for young adults. A former newspaper editor, college teacher, and freelance copyeditor, Echols now writes full-time.

Her first novel, Major Crush, drew on her own experiences as the first female drum major of her high school marching band. Echols splits her writing between light romantic comedies and more intense dramas. In April 2012, Echols wrote "I love writing romantic dramas like Such a Rush and the book I'm cooking up now [Dirty Little Secret], but I would feel a hole in my heart if I didn't have the chance to write YA romantic comedies again."

Major Crush won the National Reader's Choice Award, and Going Too Far was a finalist in the RITA, the National Reader's Choice Award, and the Book Buyer's Best, and was nominated by the American Library Association as a Best Book for Young Adults. Love Story was a 2011 Finalist for the Goodreads Choice Award for Young Adult Fiction.

The Romantic Times described Jennifer Echols as a "tremendously talented writer with a real gift for developing relationships".

April 10, 2012, Echols announced on her Livejournal that she has sold three more YA romantic comedies to Simon Pulse. These novels will not be a part of the Simon Pulse Romantic Comedy series. Instead, they will be a trilogy focused on high school students who have won superlative awards. Echols described the "Superlatives Series" as "three novels about seniors at a Florida high school who are selected for their class Who's Who categories, and how the labels change the way they view themselves and alter the course of their lives." These novels were published in 2014 and 2015.

In her November 10, 2012, blog post, Echols also mentioned a desire to write more novels for the Levitating Las Vegas and Stargazer series as well as more young adult dramas but said future contracts depend entirely on the sales of her 2013 novels.

In February 2013, Echols noted on her Twitter account and Livejournal blog that she was starting to work on proposals for the possible sequels in the Levitating Las Vegas and Stargazer series as well as a new young adult drama as Dirty Little Secret is the last that she has scheduled. Echols also mentioned that she has completed the first manuscript for the first young adult comedy in the Superlatives series and has also been working on an outline for the second. Both of these novels are slated for release in 2014.

In August 2013, it was confirmed that there will be a third novel in the Stargazer series.

== Bibliography ==
=== Young adult comedies ===
- Major Crush (August 1, 2006)
- The Boys Next Door (June 26, 2007) - included in the bind-up Endless Summer
- The Ex Games (September 8, 2009) - included in the bind-up Winter's Kiss
- Endless Summer (May 25, 2010) - bind-up including The Boys Next Door and its sequel which is also titled Endless Summer. This was the first bind-up created for the SimonPulse Romantic Comedies series.
- The One That I Want (December 6, 2011 [ebook]; February 7, 2012 [paperback])
- Winter's Kiss (January 3, 2012) - bind-up including The Ex Games and Catherine Hapka's The Twelve Dates of Christmas
- Biggest Flirts (May 20, 2014) - first book in the Superlatives series
- Perfect Couple (December 2014) - second book in the Superlatives series
- Most Likely to Succeed (August 2015) - third book in the Superlatives series

=== Young adult dramas ===
- Going Too Far (March 17, 2009)
- Forget You (July 20, 2010)
- Love Story (July 19, 2011) - Nominee for Goodreads Choice Award - 2011 Best Young Adult Fiction
- Love on the Edge (January 31, 2012) - bind-up including Going to Far and Forget You
- Such a Rush (July 10, 2012)
- Dirty Little Secret (July 16, 2013)

=== New adult ===
- Levitating Las Vegas (May 7, 2013)

=== Adult ===
- Starcrossed (February 26, 2013) - first novel in the Stargazer series
- Playing Dirty (October 29, 2013) - second novel in the Stargazer series

== Personal life ==
Echols lives in Alabama with her husband and son.
