= Suzanne Whang =

American actress (1962–2019)

- Born: September 28, 1962; Arlington, Virginia, U.S.
- Died: September 17, 2019 (aged 56); Los Angeles, California, U.S.
- Occupations: Actress, television host, comedian, radio host, author, minister, writer, producer, political activist
- Years active: 1990–2019
- Spouse(s): Michael Freed (divorced) Jay Nickerson (m. 2013; div. 2015)

Suzanne Whang (Korean: 황보희, Hwang Bo-hui, September 28, 1962 – September 17, 2019) was an American television host, comedian, radio host, author, minister, writer, producer, and political activist. She is best known for having been the host of the HGTV series House Hunters for nine years, and for her recurring role as manicurist Polly Chae on Las Vegas for four seasons. Suzanne also starred as Divina the maid/wannabe actress in the Here TV sitcom From Here on OUT.

== Personal life ==
Whang was Korean-American. Her parents were born in Seoul, South Korea. Her maternal grandfather is Kim Won-Kyu. She was born in Arlington, Virginia. She held a B.A. in psychology from Yale University and an M.Sc. degree in cognitive psychology from Brown University. As a graduate student, she conducted research with William H. Warren on visually guided action.

Whang, in temporary remission from stage 4 breast cancer, wrote and performed a solo show about her experience, and was writing a book about it at the time she died.

On October 19, 2013, Whang married long-time boyfriend Jay Nickerson at The Church of St. Paul and St. Andrew in Manhattan. The two had met decades prior, working together in theater.

Whang died on September 17, 2019, in her Los Angeles home, after a 13-year battle with cancer, aged 56. Her remains were later cremated.

== Career ==
Whang hosted House Hunters from 1999 to 2007 on HGTV and had a recurring role as Polly the spa manager on NBC's drama Las Vegas. She made her television debut as a "Road Warrior" (remote correspondent) on the FX network's two-hour morning show Breakfast Time in the 1990s, and later co-hosted the network's Pet Department.

In 2002, Whang won the Best Up & Coming Comedian Award at the Las Vegas Comedy Festival, for her controversial alter ego character, Sung Hee Park.

Whang won the first annual Andy Kaufman Award at the 2004 New York Comedy Festival.

She made a guest appearance on Criminal Minds in the episode "Poison" in a brief cameo as a local TV reporter.

Since January 2011, Whang had portrayed Carol Cheng, Brenda Barrett's wedding planner and rumored to have been involved with Franco, on the TV series General Hospital.

In November 2011, Whang joined the cast of Don't Tell My Mother, a monthly storytelling event in which celebrities share true stories they'd never want their mothers to know.

== Filmography ==
=== Television ===
Year	Title	Role	Notes
1994	Personal fX: The Collectibles Show	Self	
1994	Personal fX: Breakfast Time	Self	
1996	Personal fX: The Pet Department	Self	
1996	Fox After Breakfast	Self	
1998	New Attitudes	Self	
1998	TV Censored Bloopers 98	Self	
1999	House Hunters	Self/Host	129 episodes
1999	V.I.P.	Diana Lu	1 episode
2000	Blitz Build 2000	Self	Television special
2000	18 Wheels of Justice	Tina Mack	Episode #2.12: A Place Called Defiance
2001	The Chronicle	Christy Kwan	1 episode
2001	NYPD Blue	Dr. Kim	1 episode
2001	The Norm Show	Woman #3	1 episode
2002	The Practice	Foreperson	1 episode
2002	Robbery Homicide Division	Reporter	1 episode
2002	Strong Medicine	Dr. Sporich	1 episode
2004	Still Standing	Patron	1 episode
2004	The Sports List	Self	
2005	The Making of the Rose Parade 2005	Self	TV special
2005	Las Vegas	Polly Nguyen	Recurring role, 12 episodes
2005	Nip/Tuck	Nurse Lee	1 episode
2005	Two and a Half Men	Anesthesiologist	1 episode
2005	The Making of the Rose Parade 2006	Self	TV special
2006	Brothers & Sisters	Carly	1 episode
2006	Cold Case	Mrs. Lee	1 episode
2006	Without a Trace	Linda Porter	1 episode
2006	Boston Legal	Juror #1	1 episode
2006	Criminal Minds	Reporter	1 episode
2006	2006 Asian Excellence Awards	Self	TV special
2006	Premium Blend	Self	1 episode
2006	House Hunters International	Self/Host	153 episodes
2007	Tom Green's House Tonight	Self	1 episode
2009	GSN Live	Self	6 episodes
2009	Live! From the Future	Self	1 episodes
2009	Un-Broke: What You Need to Know About Money	Anchorwoman	TV special
2010	The Secret Life of the American Teenager	Fern	1 episode
2011	General Hospital	Carol Cheng	8 episodes
2013	Arrested Development	Olive Garden	1 episode
2013	Dexter	Anchor Woman	2 episodes
2014	Anger Management	Bank Teller	1 episode
2014	From Here on OUT	Divina Sung Hee	Series regular, 6 episodes
2014	Hell's Kitchen	Self	Episode #12.04: "17 Chefs Compete"
2014	TMI Hollywood	Various	3 episodes
2014	Hungry	Reverend Sookee	1 episode
2014	Don't Ask Nancy	Sung-Hee Park	3 episodes
2014	The Kim Kardashian Show	Sung-Hee Park	1 episode
2014	The McCarthys	Surgeon	1 episode
2014	About a Boy	Another Mom	1 episode
2015	Kingdom	Dr. Lynn Bennett	2 episodes
2015	Quantum Wisdom	Self	
2015	Reality Television Awards	Self/Presenter	TV special
2015	Beverly Hills Royal	Self	1 episode
2015	The Playboy Morning Show	Self	2 episode
2015	After Dark with Julian Clark	Self	1 episode
2016	Angel from Hell	Woman	1 episode
2017	The Mick	Dr. Frenkel	Recurring role, 2 episodes
2019	For the People	Lori Pak	Episode #2.02: "This is America"

=== Film ===
Year	Title	Role	Notes
1990	A Matter of Degrees	Student	
2002	Seoul Mates	Sung-Hee Park	Short
2003	Date or Disaster	Sock Puppet Actor	Short
2003	Melvin Goes to Dinner	Extra	Short
2004	Ring of Darkness	Television Reporter	TV movie
2004	The Perfect Husband: The Laci Peterson Story	Second Reporter	TV movie
2005	Edison	Medical Examiner	
2005	Constantine	Mother	
2005	Traci Townsend	Rosa	
2006	Material Girls	TV News Anchor	
2009	Twice as Dead	Courier Person	
2011	Son of Morning	Ch 7 Anchor Sherrie	
2014	Midnight	Madame Yumi	Short
2014	The Widow's Mark	Auntie Jean	
2016	The Family Weekends	Sue Clancy	
2017	Til Death Do Us Part	Dr. Wong	
2017	Think and Grow Rich: The Legacy	March Fong Eu	
2019	Mr. Right Now	Sabrina	Short
TBA	The Pipeline	Judy	Posthumous release, in post-production

=== Miscellaneous ===
Year	Title	Role	Notes
1996	Secrets of the Luxor	Sammy Lee (Voice)	Video Game
2005	Now That's Funny		Video
2005	Fresh News	Myung	Video
2009	Spiritual Liberation	Self	Video
2011	Carmageddon, Traffic Update	Ching Chong Ling Long Ting Tong	Video
2014	The Heidi Selexa Show	Self	Podcast
2015	Kim Jong-Un Hosts the Tonight Show	Sung-Hee Park	Video
2015	Scheana Shay Wedding Planner	Ming	Video
2019	Defrost: The Virtual Series	WorldCast Floor Manager	Video
