= DeLuise =

DeLuise may refer to:

- Members of the DeLuise family of entertainers:
  - Dom DeLuise (1933–2009), American actor and comedian
  - Carol DeLuise (1935–2020), American actress known professionally as Carol Arthur; wife of Dom
  - Peter DeLuise (born 1966), American actor, television director, and television producer; son of Dom and Carol
  - Anne Marie DeLuise (born 1969), Canadian actress; wife of Peter
  - Michael DeLuise (born 1969), American former actor; son of Dom and Carol
  - David DeLuise (born 1971), American actor; son of Dom and Carol
- 84012 Deluise, a minor planet discovered in 2002
