= Ezio Greggio =

Italian comedian, actor, writer and film director

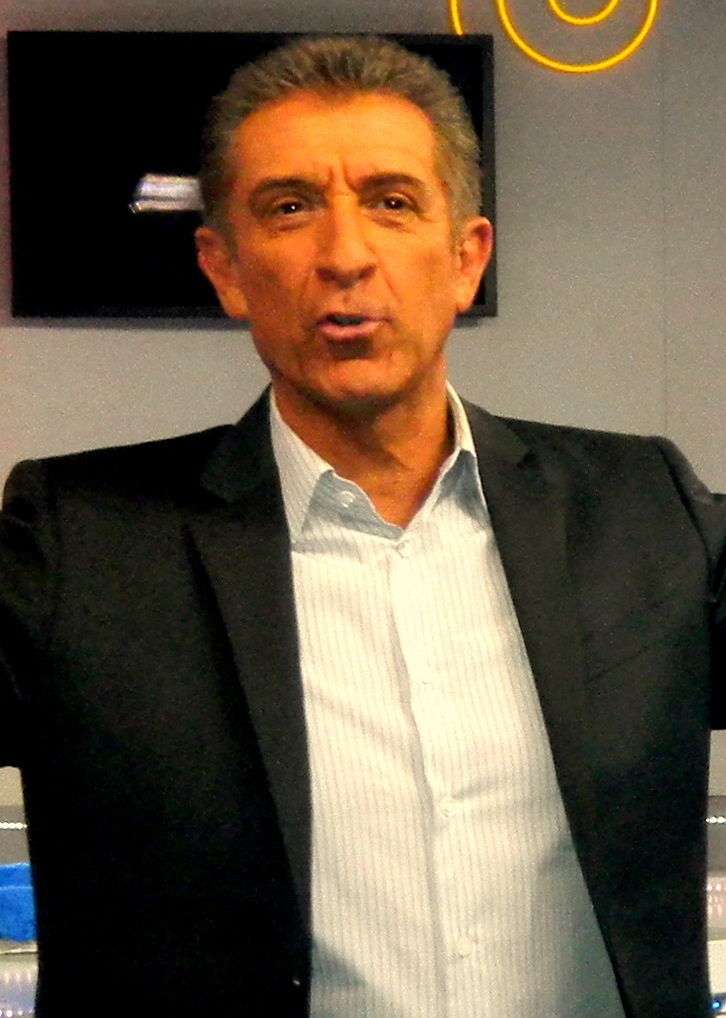
- Greggio in 2012
- Born: 7 April 1954 (age 72); Cossato, Italy
- Occupations: Actor; comedian; film director; writer
- Years active: 1972–present
- Website: eziogreggio.it

Ezio Greggio (Italian pronunciation: [ˈɛttsjo ˈɡreddʒo]; born 7 April 1954) is an Italian comedian, actor, writer and film director.

In Italy, he is known for his long-lasting appearances in TV shows like Drive In and Striscia la notizia; abroad he is noted for his movies and his collaboration with Mel Brooks.

== TV career ==
Born in Cossato, a small town near Biella, Greggio began his TV career at age 18 in Telebiella, the first local private owned station in Italy.

In 1978 he was hired as a comedian in RAI, appearing in La sberla e Tutto compreso with Giancarlo Nicotra and Giancarlo Magalli. His appearances in the national TV didn't gain him fame, but Greggio had the chance to meet Gianfranco D'Angelo, another young comedian.

D'Angelo convinced Greggio to move to the new Fininvest (later Mediaset), a local TV channel founded in Milan by Silvio Berlusconi. They were both included in the cast of the main show of the network, Drive In, a 2-hour weekly show featuring a bunch of young emerging comedians. Greggio quickly became spotlight chaser of the whole show.

In 1988 he followed the creator and head writer Antonio Ricci to a long series of successful shows: after Odiens, a show loosely inspired by Drive In, Greggio in 1990 and 1993 presented Paperissima, a container for bloopers and funny homemade videos. In these shows, Greggio created his most famous recurring gags.

Since 1988 he has been the main presenter (along with D'Angelo and later Enzo Iacchetti) of Striscia la notizia, a daily television news parody. He starred in the program every year for some months, from the beginning up to now.

== Movie career ==
Greggio wrote and acted his first movie, Sbamm!, in 1980.

He was noted by Carlo Vanzina, and was included in the cast of Yuppies, in the 1986 sequel Yuppies 2 and in the 1987 film Montecarlo Gran Casinò with Paolo Rossi.

He appeared in many other comic/trash films, almost always directed by Enrico Oldoini.

In 1994, he debuted as director with The Silence of the Hams, a parody movie inspired by The Silence of the Lambs and Psycho. The movie was shot in the United States: during this work, Greggio built a strong friendship with movie director Mel Brooks and with Dom DeLuise (both appearing in the movie).

Brooks named one of Dom DeLuise's killers in his Robin Hood: Men in Tights, "Dirty Ezio", and had Greggio in the cast of Dracula: Dead and Loving It.

In 1997, Greggio came back to the camera, directing The Good Bad Guy and in 1999 Screw Loose, with Mel Brooks as actor.

Since 2000, Greggio has acted in a great number of TV productions, although he would return to movies once more in 2011 with Box Office 3D: The Filmest of Films.

Greggio moved his residence to Montecarlo, and is the director of the Montecarlo Film Festival.

== Personal life ==
Ezio Greggio has two sons, Giacomo and Gabriele, born respectively in 1991 and 1995, with then-wife and Spanish model Isabel Bengochea. They divorced in the early 2000s. He later had relationships with other younger women. From 2019 to 2023 he had a romance with Romina.

In February 2025, he confirmed his relationship with the Food Influencer Nataly Ospina.

Since 2015 he also has Albanian citizenship.

== As a writer ==
Ezio Greggio published five humor books with Mondadori:

- Presto che è tardi (1997)
- Chi se ne fut-fut (1998)
- E lui o non è lui? (1999)
- E su e giù e trik e trak (2003)
- In una certa manieeera (2005)
- N°1. Una vita di avventure, incontri, scherzi e risate (2023)

== Filmography ==
Film roles showing year released, title, role played and notes
Title	Year	Role	Notes
Sbamm!	1980	Pallone	Feature film debut
Yuppies	1986	Willie	
Yuppies 2	1986	Willie	
Montecarlo Gran Casinò	1987	Oscar	
Occhio alla perestrojka	1990	Marco	
Vacanze di Natale '90	1990	Arturo Zampini	
Vacanze di Natale '91	1991	Leopoldo	
Infelici e contenti	1992	Vittorio	
Anni 90	1992	Psychologist	Cameo appearance
The Silence of the Hams	1994	Antonio Motel	Also director and screenwriter
Miracolo italiano	1994	Manuel Rodriguez	
Selvaggi	1995	Bebo	
Dracula: Dead and Loving It	1995	The Coachman	
The Good Bad Guy	1997	Joe Fortunato	Also producer, director and screenwriter
Screw Loose	1999	Bernardo Puccini	Also director
2001: A Space Travesty	2000	Valentino	
Un'estate al mare	2008	Ugo Persichetti	
Giovanna's Father	2008	Sergio Ghia	
Box Office 3D: The Filmest of Films	2011	Various	Also director, screenwriter and executive producer
Lockdown all'italiana	2020	Giovanni	

=== Television ===
Television roles showing year released, title, role played and notes
Title	Year	Role	Notes
La sberla	1978–1979	Co-host	Variety show
Tutto compreso	1981	Co-host	Variety show
Drive In	1983–1988	Various characters	Main performer (seasons 1–5)
Miss Italia 1987	1987	Host	Annual beauty contest
Striscia la notizia	1988–present	Host	Regular host (seasons 1–3, 5–27, 29–present)
Odiens	1988–1989	Host	Variety show
Paperissima	1990–1993	Host	Seasons 1 and 3
Anni '50	1998	Arturo Colombo	Miniseries
Anni '60	1999	Vittorio Ferrari	Miniseries
Un maresciallo in gondola	2002	Arturo Colombo	Television film
Benedetti dal Signore	2004	Friar Giacomo	Lead role; 8 episodes
O la va, o la spacca	2004–2005	Erminio	Miniseries
Veline	2008–2012	Host	Seasons 3–4
Occhio a quei due	2009	Edo Marchini	Television film
