= David DeLuise =

American actor (born 1971)

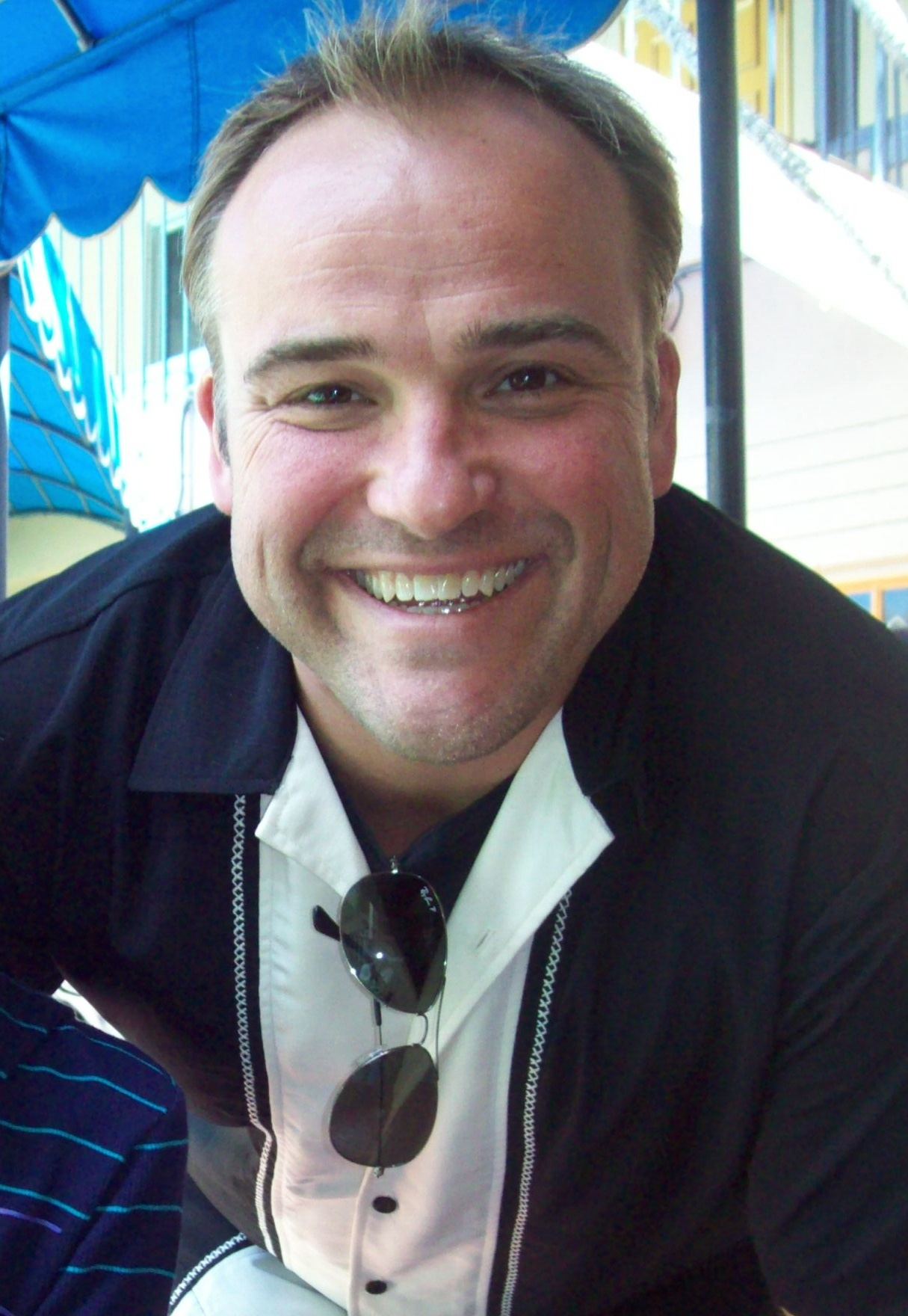
- DeLuise in 2007
- Born: David Dominick DeLuise; November 11, 1971 (age 54); Burbank, California, U.S.
- Occupation: Actor
- Years active: 1979–present
- Spouses: Brigitte DeLuise (m. 1994; div. 2003) Julia Stoepel (m. 2019)
- Children: 2
- Parent(s): Dom DeLuise; Carol Arthur
- Relatives: Michael DeLuise (brother); Peter DeLuise (brother)

David Dominick DeLuise (born November 11, 1971) is an American actor. He has had roles in numerous films and television shows. He is best known for playing Coop on Megas XLR and Jerry Russo on Wizards of Waverly Place.

== Early life, family and education ==
David DeLuise is one of three sons of actors Dom DeLuise and Carol Arthur. David's brothers, Michael DeLuise and Peter DeLuise, are also actors.

== Career ==
David, began acting when he was a child.

He appeared in several TV series in his 20s. In 1998, he performed on the first season of the sitcom Jesse. He had a recurring role in 3rd Rock from the Sun as Bug Pollone. His first leading role came in 2003 with Dantre Cole, in BachelorMan. He also played a recurring role in Stargate SG-1 as Pete Shanahan.

He was also seen in a Purina commercial for Beneful dog food, and a Kentucky Fried Chicken commercial. He also had special appearances in Gilmore Girls season 4 episodes 20 and 21 as TJ's brother.

DeLuise is also known for voicing Coop on the short-lived action animated Megas XLR (later reprising his role for the Cartoon Network game FusionFall) and Sergeant Brutto in Roughnecks: Starship Troopers Chronicles. In 2005, he starred opposite Maggie Wheeler on the NBC pilot The Sperm Donor. In 2012, he had a guest role on Rizzoli & Isles as Dominic.

He portrayed the character of Jerry Russo, the family patriarch and former wizard on Disney Channel's Wizards of Waverly Place and Wizards of Waverly Place: The Movie from 2007 to 2012. DeLuise also directed numerous episodes of the series, beginning with the episode "My Tutor, Tutor" (2009). He has since directed episodes of How to Rock, See Dad Run, Lab Rats, and The Thundermans.

In 2010 David started mentoring young actors at AGB Studios. Various young actors have started successful acting careers under David.

In August 2012 he appeared in a commercial for KFC's Original Recipe Bites.

In February 2023 he started the podcast Wizards of Waverly Pod with Jennifer Stone, where both talk about their experience on the show Wizards of Waverly Place.

== Personal life ==
DeLuise is dyslexic. He is married to German voice actress Julia DeLuise. He has two children. Around the time his first daughter was born, he was working in carpentry.

== Filmography ==
=== Film ===
Year	Title	Role	Notes
1979	Hot Stuff	David Fortunato	
1983	Happy	Rogie	Television film
1991	Driving Me Crazy	Stanley	
1991	Seeds of Tragedy	Customer	Television film
1993	Robin Hood: Men in Tights	Villager	Uncredited role
1993	The Liars' Club	Joey Matthews	
1994	The Silence of the Hams	Policeman #1	
1995	Kicking and Screaming	Bouncer	
1995	Dracula: Dead and Loving It	Intern	
1996	Where Truth Lies	Policeman #1	
1998	Hairshirt	Peter Angelo	
1998	The Godson	Gaffer	
1999	Dirt Merchant	Sly	
2000	Terror Tract	Allen Doyle	Segment: "Make Me An Offer"
2001	Ladies and the Champ	Darold Boyarsky	Television film
2001	Dr. Dolittle 2	School Fish #2 (voice)	
2002	Rockboy	Chadd Nessbaum	Short film
2002	Buying the Cow	Fratguy	
2003	Between the Sheets	Director	
2003	Art of Revenge	Benjamin Bloom	
2003	BachelorMan	Ted David	
2005	Play Dates	Billy	Television film
2006	Intellectual Property	Detective Kopf	
2006	Jam	Jerry	
2006	Where There's a Will	Willy	Television film
2006	Mojave Phone Booth	Michael	
2007	Route 30	Original Bill	
2007	Who's Your Monkey?	Hutto	
2008	Dear Me	Bass Vanders	
2008	Bundy: An American Icon	Detective Jennings	
2008	Mostly Ghostly	John Doyle	Direct-to-video film
2008	A Christmas Proposal	Andy	
2009	RoboDoc	Dr. Bonacasa	
2009	Prep & Landing	Dancer (voice)	Television film
2009	Wizards of Waverly Place: The Movie	Jerry Russo	Television film
2010	Vampires Suck	Fisherman Scully	
2011	American Decaf	David	
2012	Ira Finkelstein's Christmas	Max Finkelstein	
2012	Last Call	Mike	
2012	A Christmas Wedding Date	Minister	Television film
2013	The Wizards Return: Alex vs. Alex	Jerry Russo	Television film
2013	Alone for Christmas	Dad	
2014	Beethoven's Treasure Tail	Phil	
2015	Unity	Narrator	Documentary
2016	Believe	Tom Blackhorn	
2016	Pup Star	Steven	Television film
2017	Sweet, Sweet Summertime	Scott Burns	
2018	Unbroken: Path to Redemption	Howard Lambert	
2021	Last Shoot Out	Joe	
TBA	Concert Heroes		

=== Television ===
Year	Title	Role	Notes
1990	21 Jump Street	Stevenson	Episode: "Number One with a Bullet"
1991	Hunter	Randy Morton	Episode: "All That Glitters"
1993	Saved by the Bell: The College Years	Tony	Episode: "The Poker Game"
1993	Lois & Clark: The New Adventures of Superman	Toaster #2	Episode: "I've Got a Crush on You"
1994	Blossom	Randy	Episode: "A Little Help from My Friends"
1994	seaQuest DSV	Manager	Episode: "Vapors"
1995	Ellen	Robber in Hat	Episode: "Guns 'N Ellen"
1995	Pig Sty	Cal's Friend	Episode: "Party!!!"
1996	Buddies	Tom	Episode: "John, I've Been Thinking"
1996–2001	3rd Rock from the Sun	Bug Pollone	Recurring role (46 episodes)
1997	Home Improvement	Dennis Turner	Episode: "Communication Breakdown"
1997	The Single Guy	Booth Guy	Episode: "Grandfather Clause"
1998–1999	Jesse	Darren Warner	Main role, season 1 (22 episodes)
1999	Good vs Evil	Roland	Episode: "To Be or Not to Be Evil"
1999–2000	Roughnecks: The Starship Troopers Chronicles	Sgt. Francis Brutto	Voice; recurring role (11 episodes)
2000	Zoe, Duncan, Jack and Jane	Todd Lamber	Episode: "The Feud"
2000	V.I.P.	Alvin	Episode: "Lights, Camera, Val"
2001	Grounded for Life	Father Tim	Episode: "Devil with A Plaid Skirt"
2001	Heavy Gear: The Animated Series	Dirx	Voice
2001	CSI: Crime Scene Investigation	Cliff Renteria	Episode: "Scuba Doobie-Doo"
2003	She Spies	The Jeff	Episode: "Learning to Fly"
2003	Spider-Man: The New Animated Series	Jack / Mack	Voice, episode: "Flash Memory"
2004	Heavy Gear	Dirx	40 episodes
2004	Gilmore Girls	T.J.'s Brother	2 episodes
2004	Good Girls Don't	Tim	Episode: "Oh, Brother"
2004	Las Vegas	Tom	Episode: "Have You Ever Seen the Rain? "
2004–2005	Stargate SG-1	Pete Shanahan	4 episodes
2004–2005	Megas XLR	Coop, Evil Coop, additional voices	Voice, main role (26 episodes)
2005	CSI: NY	Lance Moretti	Episode: "Til Death Do We Part"
2005	Blind Justice	Detective Jason Strode	Episode: "Under the Gun"
2005	ER	Brad Anderson	Episode: "Blame It on the Rain"
2005	Yes, Dear	Dan	Episode: "Jimmy the Teacher"
2006	CSI: Miami	Paul Sanders	Episode: "The Score"
2006	Monk	Larry Cutler	Episode: "Mr. Monk and the Garbage Strike"
2007	Without a Trace	Alex Brown	Episode: "Desert Springs"
2007	Bones	Santa Jeff Mantell	Episode: "The Santa in the Slush"
2007–2012	Wizards of Waverly Place	Jerry Russo	Main Role
2011	Imagination Movers	Clutch	Episode: "One Cool Mover"
2011	Svetlana		Episode: "Amerimorphation"
2012	Hot in Cleveland	Jake	Episode: "How Did You Guys Meet, Anyway?"
2012	The Mentalist	Mr. Loveland	Episode: "Something Rotten in Redmund"
2012	Grey's Anatomy	Charlie Connor	Episode: "Let the Bad Times Roll"
2012	Rizzoli & Isles	Dominick Bianchi	Episode: "Crazy For You"
2013	R.L. Stine's The Haunting Hour	Cupid	Episode: "Terrible Love".
2013	Pulling the Goalie	Therapist	Short film
2013	Sox	Nick	
2013	Abner, the Invisible Dog	Murdoch	
2013	Delicious Ambiguity	John	Short
2013	Catch	Umpire	Short
2014	Baby Daddy	David Brinkerhoff	Episode: "From Here to Paternity"
2014	Sam & Cat	Photographer Assistant	Episode: "#GettinWiggy"
2014	Hawaii Five-0	Brad Weiss	Episode: "Ho'oma'ike (Unmasked)"
2015	Born Again Virgin		Episode: "Sex, Kings and Wigs"
2017	Hey You, It's Me	Ben	Episode: "Yes! But Different"
2017	Real Rob	Dean Edelstein	Episode: "Best Play Date Ever"
2019	NCIS	Michael Franklin	Episode: "Going Mobile"
2019	Shameless	Army Proctor	Episode: "A Little Gallagher Goes A Long Way"
2021	9-1-1	Tom Gladden	Episode: "Ghost Stories"
2022	The Rookie	Truman	Episode: "Long Shot"
2022	This Is Us	Bill Lundy	Episode: "Miguel"
2024	That '90s Show	Judge Jezner	Episode: "I'll Stand by You"
2024–2025	Wizards Beyond Waverly Place	Jerry Russo	2 episodes

=== Video games ===
Year	Title	Voice role
2005	Megas XLR: Appetite for Demolition	Coop
2009	FusionFall	Coop
