= Bloodsuckers (2005 film) =

- Written by: Matthew Hastings
- Directed by: Matthew Hastings
- Starring: Dominic Zamprogna; A.J. Cook; Natassia Malthe
- Theme music composer: Davor Vulama
- Country of origin: Canada
- Original language: English

Production
- Producer: Gilles LaPlante
- Cinematography: Eric J. Goldstein
- Editor: Garry M.B. Smith
- Running time: 99 minutes
- Production companies: Daniel Grodnik Productions; Lions Gate Films; Vega Productions; Kandu Entertainment; Creative Arts Entertainment Group Inc. Coote Hayes Productions

Original release
- Network: Sci Fi Channel
- Release: May 8, 2005

Bloodsuckers (also known as Vampire Wars: Battle for the Universe) is a 2005 television film by Daniel Grodnik Productions directed by Matthew Hastings and produced by Gilles Laplante. The film stars Natassia Malthe and Dominic Zamprogna as the premier protagonists working as vampire hunters in space. The film had a mixed reception.

== Plot ==
The year is 2210. Humans have moved out into space. In doing so, they have encountered several alien races—like the Leatherfaces and the Vorhees—all of them vampiric. In order to make space safe for humans, V-San (Vampire Sanitation) crews serve as advance teams, sweeping planets of vampires and making them habitable for humans. The V-San crew of the Heironymous is captained by Nicholas Churchill, who loves his job as vampire hunter. First officer is Damian Underwood, new to the job after being hand-picked by Churchill after Damian was blacklisted by Star Fleet for leading a mission that got his entire crew killed. Damian would rather do almost anything but V-San work, but Churchill isn't about to sign for Damian's transfer, not when he can get a cheap but top-notch Star Fleet educated commander who needs just a bit of training (and stomach) in vampire killing. Rosa Wong and Roman Kuchinsky form the rest of the human crew. Then there is Quintana—beautiful, telepathic, and born a vampire-human of two humans who were vampirized. Quintana has chosen to side with humans in the intergalactic war against vampires, but that doesn't stop Rosa and Roman from questioning her loyalty and making snide remarks to her face.

After cleaning up the mess following a Vorhee attack on Earth Base Quantum in the Takai System, the Heironymous receives a distress call from a scared soil-sample technician on Basra 14, a remote mining colony. Fiona Kennedy is the sole survivor of an attack by Leatherfaces. His stomach still churning from his first experience hunting vampires, Damian follows the captain into the mining shafts, where they are trapped and the captain is captured and killed. Suddenly, Damian is catapulted to the position of Captain of the crew, but Rosa and Roman make it clear they aren't going to take orders from Damian, blaming him for not doing enough to save Churchill from the Leatherfaces.

With no further assignments in the roster, the Heironymous puts down at Transit Station DHF in the Millerton Quadrant to drop off Fiona and allow the crew a little R&R while awaiting orders. After an evening at the clubs, Damian tries to get his crew back to the ship only to find that Rosa and Roman are refusing to reboard. Instead, they have put in for a transfer and intend to go clubbing in the interim, but their retinal scans and IDs suddenly won't work. They have been classified as V-San persona non grata and now have nowhere to go but back to the ship where Damian offers them a deal. One more assignment together and he'll sign for their transfers. Until then, all protocols must be followed under his command, and the bickering between Rosa, Roman, and Quintana must stop. After more bickering, they agree.

Suddenly, an urgent SOS comes in from the Transit Station. They are under attack. By the time the Heironymous returns, everyone is dead. After a preliminary investigation of the dead bodies, Quintana admits that she doesn't recognize the vampire species but can tell that they kill by injecting a venom that causes immediate necrotization of the tissues; it is on the dead, rotting, warm flesh that these vampires feed. The hunters go in search of the vampire and find him feeding; they shoot him but, horror upon horror, a number of leech-like vampire worms crawl out of his mouth. Quintana now recognizes Vermis nosferati, a species of wormlike vampires that lives inside the body of a host and comes out only to feed. After the crew stabs and shoots all the vampires until the last one emerges from a hole in the vampire's stomach, Quintana tries to talk to it. It will say nothing but rant about the arrogance of humans. Remembering how vampires killed his entire family when he was a child, Roman shoots it, which starts another big row between Quintana, Rosa, and Roman.

Meanwhile, watching from closed circuit cameras, Fiona and her friends Gilles and Vondi discuss the arrogance of their human species and applaud the work their group has accomplished in their efforts to put a monkey wrench in "unbridled Earth imperialism." Convinced that the Earth's declaration of Manifest Destiny is a plague on the galaxy, they have been plotting with Muco, leader of the Vorhees to stop the intergalactic expansion of humans and end prejudice against vampires.

Back on the Heironymous, Damian is attempting to fit the pieces together. One thing he noticed in both the last two attacks is that, although the vampire species involved were different, the electronic defense systems of both stations had been shut down. He also noticed that Fiona's body was not amongst the dead found on the Transit Station and wonders if she might be the key. Fiona goes to a station, he reasons, and dismantles the electronic defense system. When the vampires come in, Fiona gets out and moves on to her next target. Reasoning further that Fiona must have left the Transit Station just before they returned, Damian calls up the record of her departing flight plan and learns that it leads to Cosmosis. Just then, they get a call from HQ directing them on a search and destroy mission in the Knobe System, but Damian and the crew decide that taking a little detour to Cosmosis is necessary to revenge Captain Churchill's death, even if it means they'll all be fired. The crew doesn't know that Damian made up the assignment from HQ, but it served the purpose of uniting the crew.

The Heironymous follows Fiona's ship, which leads them, instead, to Dhiagalev 8, a depleted ore planet. Just after they land, they are attacked by a small craft that Roman manages to shoot out of the sky. Unfortunately, it lands on the Heironymous and blows it up. Stranded, they decide to head for the old colony, looking for a way off the planet. They find the colony, and they also find Fiona and vampires. Fiona promises that no one will get hurt if Damian goes with her. She leads him to Muco and Captain Churchill, who has been turned into a vampire. Churchill explains how the vampires want to learn from humans—things like compassion and cooperation—so that they can unite and take over the world. Damian refuses to teach them, so Muco orders Damian and his crew killed. Fiona, realising that Muco has lied to her, challenges Muco to show the other vampires what he is capable of, so Muco capably fires a bullet into her stomach.

While Churchill and Damian duke it out, Gilles and Vondi, after seeing the ease with which Muco killed Fiona, convince the vampires holding the Heironymous crew that Muco has ordered them released. Gilles and Vondi grab weapons and escort Rosa, Roman, and Quintana to the room where Churchill has almost bested Damian. As they enter, Gilles and Vondi toss the weapons back to the crew and they open fire on the vampires. Damian stabs Churchill in the heart with a shard of glass, then sneaks up on Muco and stabs him. Their work done here, Damian and crew head back to HQ to get a new ship.

== Cast ==
- Joe Lando as Churchill
- Dominic Zamprogna as Damian
- Natassia Malthe as Quintana
- Leanne Adachi as Rosa
- Aaron Pearl as Roman
- Jake Kaese as Young Roman
- A. J. Cook as Fiona
- Michael DeLuise as Gilles
- Michael Ironside as Muco
- David Palffy as Phleg
- Elias Toufexis as Officer Brackish
- Carrie Ann Fleming as Damian's Wife
- Charisse Baker as Woman
- John DeSantis as Ble-Ka
- Geoff Redknap as Worm Host Creature
- Krista Bell as Roman's Mom
- Daniel Bacon as Vorhee Lieutenant Pu
- Steven McMichael as Vorhee #2
- Mike Desabrais as Vorhee #3
- Brett Armstrong as Dead IPC Officer
- Mike Carpenter as Giant Beast
- Peter DeLuise as Vondi, The German Space Tourist

== Production ==
It was shot completely in Canada in the city of Vancouver and the province British Columbia.

== Soundtrack ==
The soundtrack was composed by Croatian Pop artist Davor Vulama.

=== Track list ===
- "I Know" by Max Serpentini
- "Ancient Daydream" by Malvado
- "Like You Promised" by Long John Baldry
- "Devil's Road" by King Karma
- "I Need You" by Vibrolux
- "I've Gone For A Ride" by Elevator To Hell
- "Q's Cue" by Suzka & McMillan
- "The Search" by El Mattador
- "The Clock Thickens" by Gyr8 featuring The Psychosis Twins
- "Lost" by Moneca Delain
- "Slave Ship" by The Darkest of the Hillside Thickets
- "Break Me Down" by James Murdoch
- "I'm Listening" by King Karma

== Release ==
The film premiered on 8 May 2005 in France and was released in the US on the Sci-Fi Channel on 30 July 2005. It was released to DVD on 20 June 2006.

== Reception ==
Critical reception has been mixed. Dread Central criticized the film's vampires for not being "all that menacing or compelling" while also stating that "Bloodsuckers easily ranks one of the Sci-Fi Channels most entertaining original productions yet." DVD Talk shared similar sentiments, writing "Chock full of bad acting, ridiculously pulpy dialogue, and tons of sloppily satisfying gore, Vampire Wars is by all conceivable measures a pretty awful movie. But that doesn't mean I didn't have some fun with it!"
