= Carol Arthur =

American actress (1935–2020)

- Born: Carol Arata; August 4, 1935; Hackensack, New Jersey, U.S.
- Died: November 1, 2020 (aged 85); Los Angeles, California, U.S.
- Occupation: Actress
- Years active: 1961–2004
- Spouse: Dom DeLuise (m. 1965; died 2009)
- Children: Peter DeLuise; Michael DeLuise; David DeLuise

Carol Arthur DeLuise (born Carol Arata; August 4, 1935 – November 1, 2020), known professionally as Carol Arthur, was an American actress, mainly recognizable in supporting roles in films directed by Mel Brooks.

== Early life ==
Arthur was born in Hackensack, New Jersey and raised in nearby East Rutherford, the daughter of Mildred (née Foehl) and Peter Arata, a police officer. She graduated from East Rutherford High School, where she edited the school paper and performed on stage.

== Career ==
Arthur appeared in minor roles in four films directed by Mel Brooks and in other works with her husband, Dom DeLuise, including Brooks' Blazing Saddles (1974) as the outspoken town school teacher Harriett Johnson ("You are the leading asshole in the state!").

One of her more notable credits was as the daughter of George Burns' character in The Sunshine Boys (1975). She also guest-starred on many television shows from the mid-1970s to the mid-2000s, including The Dom DeLuise Show, Emergency!, Sanford and Son, Rhoda, Alice, Steven Spielberg's Amazing Stories, St. Elsewhere, and 7th Heaven.

During the late-1970s and early-1980s, Arthur appeared as "Safety Sadie", the spokeswoman for the United States Consumer Product Safety Commission (CPSC) in several television and radio public service announcements.

Arthur also appeared in various stage productions, including the role of Mrs. Paroo in the short-lived 1980 Broadway revival of The Music Man starring Dick Van Dyke.

== Personal life ==
Arthur met her future husband, DeLuise, in 1964 while working on stage in Provincetown, Massachusetts. The couple married in 1965; together they had three sons, all of whom have become actors: Peter, Michael, and David DeLuise.

== Death ==
Arthur died on November 1, 2020, at age 85, at the Motion Picture & Television Country House and Hospital in Los Angeles. She had been diagnosed with Alzheimer's disease eleven years earlier. She was survived by her three sons and several grandchildren.

== Filmography ==
=== Film ===
Year	Title	Role	Notes
1971	Making It	Mrs. Warren	
1974	Blazing Saddles	Harriett Johnson	
1974	Our Time	Gym Teacher	
1975	The Sunshine Boys	Doris Green	
1976	Silent Movie	Pregnant lady	
1977	The World's Greatest Lover	Woman in record store	
1979	Hot Stuff	Ernie's wife	
1989	The Princess and the Dwarf		
1991	Driving Me Crazy	Jaguar boss	
1992	Almost Pregnant	Saleswoman	as 'Carol DeLuise'
1993	Robin Hood: Men in Tights	Complaining Villager	
1995	Dracula: Dead and Loving It	Villager	
1997	The Good Bad Guy	Liza	
1998	The Godson	Mama Calzone	
2000	Intrepid	Marcia Lowell	
2002	It's All About You	Producer	
2003	Between the Sheets	Gabby	

=== Television ===
Year	Title	Role	Notes
1971	Arnie	Christina	Episode: "My Sister's Keeper"
1974	Emergency!	Eloise Tanner	Episode: "Fools"
1975	Karen	Beverly Blyden	Episode: "Hartford Revisited"
1976	Sanford and Son	Ms. Barnes	Episode: "The Camping Trip"
1977	The McLean Stevenson Show	Mrs. Alcott	Episode: "What Makes Mac Run?"
1977	Rhoda	Doris	Episode: "To Vegas with Love"
1978	What's Happening!!	Mrs. Lawrence	Episode: "The Creep Detective"
1981	The Brady Girls Get Married	Mrs. Logan	TV movie
1983	Alice	The Bag Lady	Episode: "Vera on the Lam"
1983	Venice Medical	Mrs. Baker	TV movie
1983	Happy	Floor manager	TV movie
1984	St. Elsewhere	Mrs. Stovall	Episode: "Sweet Dreams"
1985	Amazing Stories	Mother	Episode: "Guilt Trip"
1990	True Colors		Episode: "Soft Shell"
1990	Lifestories		Episode: "Jerry Forchette"
1999	Boys Will Be Boys	Blanche	TV movie
2004	7th Heaven	Gertrude Fleaming	Episode: "Two Weddings, an Engagement and a Funeral"

== Theatre ==
Year	Title	Role	Notes
1961	Kicks and Co.	Ensemble	
1963	On the Town	Performer	London Revival
1964	High Spirits	Edith	Original Broadway Production
1980	The Music Man	Mrs. Paroo	Broadway Revival
1981	Woman of the Year	Jan Donovan	Original Broadway Production
