= Screw Loose =

- DVD cover
- Directed by: Ezio Greggio
- Written by: Rudy De Luca
- Produced by: Ezio Greggio; Whitney R. Hunter; Massimo Santorsola
- Starring: Mel Brooks; Ezio Greggio
- Distributed by: Columbia TriStar Home Video; Medusa Distribuzione
- Release date: 15 February 1999
- Running time: 98 min
- Country: Italy
- Language: English

Screw Loose, released as Svitati in Italy, is a 1999 Italian comedy film. It was directed by Ezio Greggio, and written by Rudy De Luca and Steve Haberman. The film stars Greggio along with Mel Brooks and Julie Condra. Filming locations included Monte Carlo and Milan. Produced by Atmosphere Film S.r.l and Wolf Pictures, it was released on 15 February 1999.

== Plot ==
A man named Bernardo Puccini visits the Italian natural food company, owned by his wealthy but hot-tempered father Guido Puccini for a work as a food examiner and flavour developer. He is delighted by the taste of a new cream cheese for which he had asked, which contains no sugar, fat and preservatives. However, its lack of sugar displeases Guido, and he angrily argues with his son for additional chemical additives instead of natural substitutes. He then experiences a heart attack and is taken to the hospital, along with his elderly doctor, Dr. Caputo.

In the hospital, while speaking to Bernardo, Guido recalls an incident during World War II where a statue of the Virgin Mary had fallen on him and pinned him down, but he was saved by an American soldier named Jake Gordon. He tells his son to go to America and deliver Jake to him as his last request for a half of his business, and Bernardo reluctantly accepts the request. Sofia, his girlfriend, who has just scheduled for a plastic surgery, questions about the request and tells him not to take up the job, but he pursues to fulfill his father's will.

Bernardo discovers that Jake Gordon has been committed to a mental hospital for decades, having been diagnosed as delusional just a day after the war ended. Arriving at Los Angeles, California, he visits the mental hospital where Jake is located. Dr. Barbara Collier and her father Dr. Hugo refuse to release him because Jake's behaviour is unpredictable and destructive. Bernardo somehow sneaks in; he manages to find Jake, reminds him of the day he saved his father, and convinces him to escape so he can reunite with Guido. Together, they escape the hospital after pushing the mental patients on wheelchairs to distract the gate guards; however, they are spotted by Dr. Barbara and Dr. Hugo, who orders for Jake to be retrieved.

As they arrive in Italy, Jake offers Bernardo a drink in which he has dissolved five sedative pills. Bernardo unknowingly downs it, causing him to become perplexed in arrival terminal. They are soon found by Dr. Barbara Collier, and Jake steals Bernardo's wallet and quickly escapes to Monte Carlo, Monaco. After recovering, Bernardo confronts Dr. Collier, saying he needs to bring Jake to his father to fulfil the request, but Collier wants Jake to return to the mental hospital so that Dr. Hugo won't hold her responsible for letting the patient escape. They both go to find Jake.

Bernardo and Collier arrive in Monte Carlo, and enter the hotel where an unidentified Jake had checked in. Bernardo tells the lobby his own name, and finds out that Jake checked in under his name. The lobby tells them that he went to the beach, and Bernardo finds Jake covering the topless female sunbathers with hand towels. Bernardo removes them, but accidentally includes a sensitive, aged sunbather, who reports him to the police for sexual harassment. Bernardo is promptly arrested. After being released from prison by Collier, Bernardo's twitching sensation is increasing, and he tells her that having Jake with him turns him insane every time Jake causes trouble. In the diner, Collier advises him to stay calm so he will be fine. When he hears the piano tune and is annoyed by twitches, he rushes for it and finds Jake. When Jake finds Collier, he departs the building, causing Bernardo to chase after him, but causing the police to follow them.

Bernardo is almost pinned down by the statue of Virgin Mary, and Jake reminds him about the incident. They finally sidestep from the police chase, but Jake is handcuffed by Collier who demands to take him with her. Bernardo does not surrender and sets up the trap, installing a fake corridor in the airport, but Jake escapes in a truck. Bernardo is arrested again. In the police station, Bernardo madly recalls Jake's practical jokes and tells them that it caused his compulsive behaviour. Dr. Collier feels remorse, so she allows him and Jake to depart back to Italy.

As Bernardo and Jake meet Guido, whose heart condition is recuperating, Guido strangles Jake for revenge because of the death of his wife. Bernardo breaks them apart, and Jake states his reason of vengeance that he had married 'Giovanna', who claimed to be Guido's wife, but realized that 'she' was actually a man disguised as a woman. Sofia approaches with her new surgical body parts, and tells the police to arrest Jake for his insanity. Dr. Collier intervenes and declares Jake a "free man", so he is released. Bernardo scolds Sofia for her abnormal femininity and her obsession with plastic surgery, and dumps her. He then persuades his father to let him take over the factory. Guido asks to call over Dr. Caputo, but his son realizes that he is dead. Bernardo later falls in love with Dr. Collier while Jake enjoys his marching dance with other patients.

Later, Bernardo marries Dr. Collier and becomes Jake's assistant, but then pretends to dislike the cream cheese the way Guido did. He visits Jake in the office, and gets a headache. Jake uses a "relocating pain" again by hitting Puccini's leg with a golf club. Bernardo runs away while Jake tries to finish the "treatment".

== Cast ==
- Ezio Greggio as Bernardo Puccini
- Mel Brooks as Jake Gordon
- Julie Condra as Dr. Barbara Collier
- Gianfranco Barra as Guido Puccini
- Randi Ingerman as Sofia
- John Karlsen as Dr. Caputo
- Enzo Iacchetti as the factory guard
- Robert Dawson as Dr. Hugo
- Sofia Milos as the woman in airport

== Reception ==
Aaron Beierle of DVD Talk called the film "oddly watchable, taking a thin plot and stringing it together with some slapstick gags that the actors overplay strangely, making the moments that do work seem almost accidental." He wrote further that "there's a certain amateurish charm about the whole thing that lets a few laughs slip through. But 'Screw Loose' is still quite a few screws short of a good picture." He found Brooks' performance to be lacking the "spark" of his previous acting efforts. Nathan Rabin of The A.V. Club wrote, "As a vehicle for the good-natured comic stylings of Greggio, Screw Loose is hopelessly broad, lazy, and underdeveloped. As a film-length argument for a mandatory retirement age for slapstick comics, it's all too convincing."

Film critic David Bleier, writing in TLA's 2004 Video & DVD Guide, rated it one out of four stars. He stated, "While Greggio and company obviously aim for the old-school comedy style of Buster Keaton and Jacques Tati, they fall well below the mark. Painful one-liners, sloppy slapstick and zero comic timing sink this quickly." Critic Leonard Maltin awarded it two out of four stars and wrote, "Brooks hams it up, but the results are only sporadically funny."
