= Situation: Comedy =

2005 American reality television show

Production
- Producers: Sean Hayes; Todd Milliner

Original release
- Network: Bravo
- Release: July 26 – September 9, 2005

Situation: Comedy is a reality show that aired on the Bravo network from July 26 until September 9, 2005. It was produced by Sean Hayes and Todd Milliner. The winner of the series was "Stephen's Life". The runner up was "The Sperm Donor".

== The Sperm Donor ==
"The Sperm Donor" was written by Mark Treitel and Shoe Schuster and directed by Amanda Bearse. It starred Maggie Wheeler, David DeLuise, Richie Keen, and Lauren Schaffel.
