= Montecarlo Gran Casinò =

- Italian theatrical release poster
- Directed by: Carlo Vanzina
- Written by: Carlo Vanzina; Enrico Vanzina
- Produced by: Aurelio De Laurentiis
- Starring: Massimo Boldi; Christian De Sica; Ezio Greggio; Paolo Rossi; Florence Guérin; Enrico Beruschi; Lisa Stothard; Lucia Stara; Guido Nicheli; Philippe Leroy
- Cinematography: Luigi Kuveiller
- Edited by: Ruggero Mastroianni
- Music by: Manuel De Sica
- Release date: 1987
- Running time: 95 min
- Language: Italian

Montecarlo Gran Casinò (i.e. "Monaco Gran Casino") is a 1987 Italian comedy film directed by Carlo Vanzina.

== Plot ==
Misadventures of five Italians at the Monte Carlo Casino: a penniless playboy lives off money from an ugly billionaire to support his gambling habit; two businessmen lose the money they needed to conclude an important deal; two cheaters, after an epic night, manage to defeat an unbeatable French card player.

== Cast ==
- Massimo Boldi as Gino
- Christian De Sica as Furio
- Ezio Greggio as Oscar
- Paolo Rossi as Paolo
- Florence Guérin as Sylvia
- Lisa Stothard as Patrizia
- Enrico Beruschi as Lino
- Philippe Leroy as Baron Duroc de Rothschild
- Guido Nicheli as Ambrogio Colombo
- Renzo Ozzano as Butler
- Mario Brega as Luciano
- Lucia Stara as Magda

== See also ==
- List of Italian films of 1987
