= Benedetti dal Signore =

- Genre: Comedy
- Created by: Ezio Greggio; Enzo Iacchetti
- Starring: Ezio Greggio; Enzo Iacchetti; Gianfranco Barra; Oliviero Corbetta; Gianni Palladino; Orio Scaduto; Daniele Nicoli; Mimmo Craig
- Country of origin: Italy
- No. of seasons: 1
- No. of episodes: 8

Production
- Running time: 50 minutes

Original release
- Network: Canale 5
- Release: January 23 – February 13, 2004

Benedetti dal Signore (Blessed by the Lord) is a 2004 Italian comedy television series set in a convent of Franciscan friars.

== See also ==
- List of Italian television series
