= Peter DeLuise =

American actor/director/producer (born 1966)

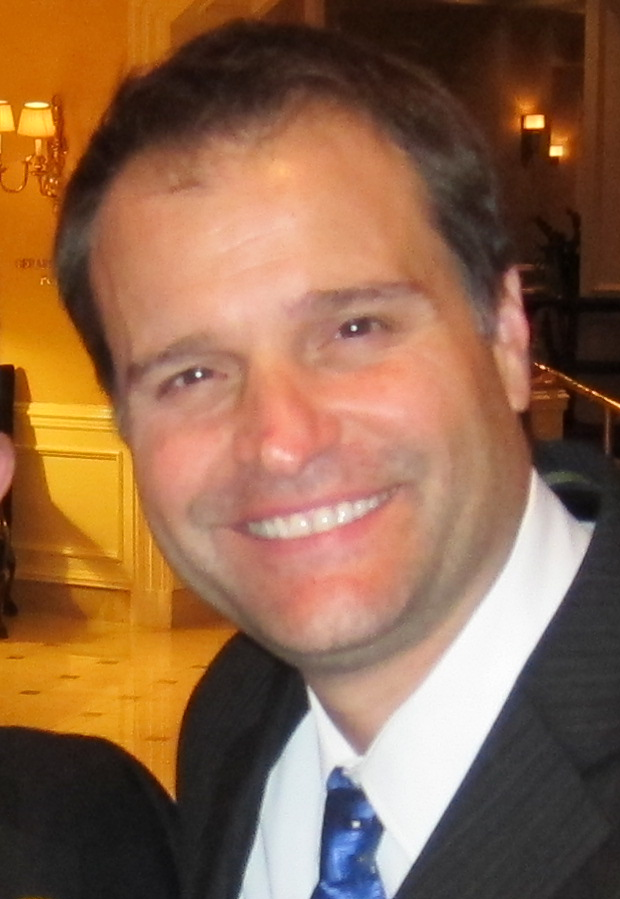
- DeLuise in 2011
- Born: Peter John DeLuise; November 6, 1966 (age 59); New York City, U.S.
- Citizenship: United States; Canada
- Occupations: Actor; director; producer; screenwriter
- Years active: 1979–present
- Spouses: Gina Nemo (m. 1988; div. 1992); Anne Marie Loder (m. 2002)
- Children: 1
- Parents: Dom DeLuise (father); Carol Arthur (mother)
- Family: Michael DeLuise (brother); David DeLuise (brother)

Peter John DeLuise (born November 6, 1966) is an American and Canadian actor, director, producer, and screenwriter. He is known for his role as Officer Doug Penhall in the Fox TV series 21 Jump Street and for directing and writing episodes of science fiction television shows, particularly in the Stargate franchise. DeLuise has been a director on the Hallmark Channel original series When Calls the Heart since its third season, including writing the fifth episode of season nine.

== Early life, family and education ==
Peter DeLuise is a son of actors Dom DeLuise and Carol Arthur. He was born in New York City. Peter has two younger brothers, actors Michael DeLuise and David DeLuise.

== Career ==
DeLuise made his film debut in the 1979 film Hot Stuff. He appeared as Officer Doug Penhall in the 1987 Fox series 21 Jump Street with other promising actors including Johnny Depp. His brother Michael came on the show in the fifth season where Michael played Peter’s character's younger brother, Officer Joey Penhall. DeLuise is also well known for his role as Dagwood on the NBC science fiction television series SeaQuest DSV from 1994 to 1996.

DeLuise has made guest appearances on the television shows The Facts of Life, 21 Jump Street spin-off Booker, Friends, Supernatural, Highlander: The Series, Gene Roddenberry's Andromeda, and Stargate SG-1.

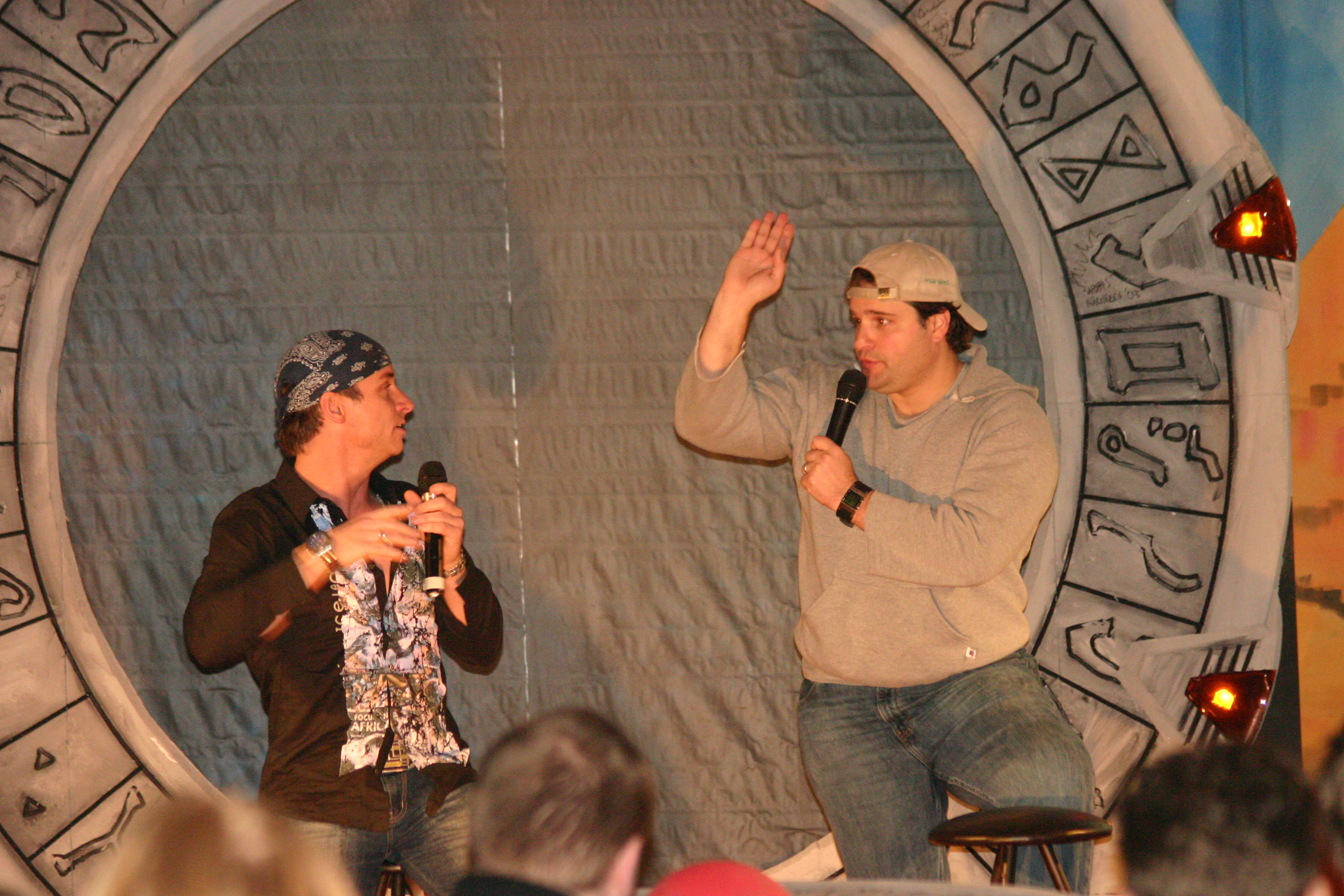
Colin Cunningham and DeLuise, at GermanCityCon on December 12, 2004

In 1997, he began working on the series Stargate SG-1, serving as producer, writer, director, and creative consultant. He has appeared, normally as an extra, in every episode of the series he has directed. He went on to work as executive producer, director and writer for the Stargate SG-1 spin-off Stargate Atlantis, and directed eight episodes of the spin-off Stargate Universe. His father, Dom DeLuise, made a guest appearance in the Stargate SG-1 episode "Urgo", which Peter directed. Peter also made a cameo in the episode as the "Urgo" character transformed to be a young man in a United States Air Force uniform.

DeLuise directed the CBC television series jPod, based on the novel of the same name by Douglas Coupland, which debuted in January 2008 and directed the fantasy film Beyond Sherwood Forest.

He made a brief cameo appearance alongside Johnny Depp in the 2012 film adaptation, 21 Jump Street. Depp, DeLuise and Holly Robinson reprised their roles as Tom Hanson, Doug Penhall and Judy Hoffs, respectively.

== Personal life ==
DeLuise was previously married to Gina Nemo; they divorced in 1992. He later married actress Anne Marie Loder on June 7, 2002; together they have one child.

== Selected filmography ==
=== Film ===
- Hot Stuff (1979)
- Free Ride (1986)
- Solarbabies (1986)
- Winners Take All (1987)
- Listen to Me (1989)
- Children of the Night (1991)
- Rescue Me aka Street Hunter (1993)
- The Silence of the Hams aka Il Silenzio dei Prosciutti (1994)
- National Lampoon's Attack of the 5 Ft. 2 In. Women (1994)
- The Shot (1996)
- Between the Sheets (1998)
- Southern Heart (1998)
- Bloodsuckers (2005)
- The Bar (2007)
- Smile of April (2008)
- 21 Jump Street (cameo) (2012)

=== Television ===
- Happy (1983)
- The Facts of Life, (1 episode, 1985)
- The Midnight Hour (1985)
- Diff'rent Strokes (1 episode, 1986)
- Booker (2 episodes, 1989)
- 21 Jump Street (84 episodes, 1987–1990)
- Haunted Lives: True Ghost Stories (1 episode, 1992)
- Highlander: The Series (1 episode, 1992)
- The Hat Squad (1 episode, 1993)
- Street Justice (1 episode, 1993)
- Friends (as Carl, 1 episode, 1996)
- SeaQuest DSV (35 episodes, 1994–1996)
- 3rd Rock from the Sun (1 episode, 1998)
- The New Outer Limits (1 episode, 1998)
- V.I.P. (1 episode, 2000)
- Before I Say Goodbye (2003)
- Stargate SG-1 (Loki; Season 7 Episode 3, 2003)
- Gene Roddenberry's Andromeda (1 episode, 2004)
- Bloodsuckers (Uncredited, 2005)
- Stargate Atlantis (Uncredited, Season 2 Episode 2, 2005)
- Engaged to Kill (2006)
- Stargate SG-1 (15 episodes, 5 uncredited episodes, 1999–2006)
- To Love and Die (Unknown episodes, 2007)
- Robson Arms (5 episodes, 2007)
- Painkiller Jane (1 episode, 2007)
- Sanctuary (2 episodes, 2007)
- Supernatural (1 episode, 2008)
- Yeti: Curse of the Snow Demon (2008)
- Stargate Universe (Peter; Season 1 Episode 4, 2009)
- Prep and Landing (2009; voice of Dancer)
- Sanctuary (1 episode, 2011)
- All Summer Long (TV Movie 2019) (Roland) (with wife)

=== Director ===
- 21 Jump Street (3 episodes, 1990–1991)
- Silk Stalkings (2 episodes, 1996)
- The Net (2 episodes, 1998–1999)
- Southern Heart (1999)
- Stargate SG-1 (57 episodes, 1999–2007)
- Hope Island (1 episode, 1999)
- Higher Ground (4 episodes, 2000)
- Romantic Comedy 101 (2001)
- V.I.P. (3 episodes, 2000–2001)
- The New Outer Limits (1 episode, 2001)
- Jeremiah (2 episodes, 2002)
- Just Deal (1 episode, 2002)
- Gene Roddenberry's Andromeda (8 episodes, 2003–2005)
- Stargate Atlantis (6 episodes, 2004–2006)
- Blood Ties (1 episode, 2007)
- Painkiller Jane (2 episodes, 2007)
- jPod (2 episodes, 2008)
- Kyle XY (4 episodes, 2008–2009)
- Sanctuary (4 episodes, 2008–2011)
- Stargate Universe (8 episodes, 2009–2011)
- 16 Wishes (TV film, 2010)
- Tower Prep (2 episodes, 2010)
- R. L. Stine's The Haunting Hour: The Series (13 episodes, 2011–2012)
- Level Up (11 episodes, 2012–2013)
- Zapped (TV film, 2014)
- R.L. Stine's Monsterville: Cabinet of Souls (TV film, 2015)
- Harvest Moon (TV film, 2015)
- Dark Matter (1 episode, 2016)
- Shadowhunters (2 episodes, 2017–2018)
- When Calls the Heart (multiple episodes, 2016–present)
- Love Under the Olive Tree (TV film, 2020)

=== Producer ===
- Jeremiah (7 episodes, 2002)
- From Stargate to Atlantis: Sci Fi Lowdown (2004)
- Stargate Atlantis (19 episodes, 2004–2005)
- Stargate SG-1 (22 episodes, 2002–2003)
- Level Up (18 episodes, 2012–2013)
- All Summer Long (TV Movie 2019) (Executive Producer)

=== Writer ===
- Between the Sheets (1998)
- Stargate Atlantis (2 episodes, 2004)
- Stargate SG-1 (15 episodes, 2000–2005)
- When Calls the Heart (1 episode, 2022)
