= Michael DeLuise =

American actor and director (born 1969)

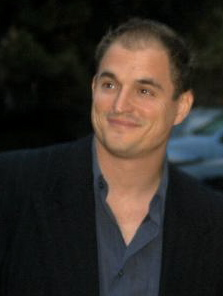
- DeLuise in 2006
- Born: Michael Robert DeLuise; August 4, 1969 (age 57); Los Angeles, California, U.S.
- Other name: Michael R. DeLuise
- Occupations: Actor; director; producer
- Years active: 1979–2013 (acting)
- Parents: Dom DeLuise; Carol Arthur
- Relatives: Peter DeLuise (brother); David DeLuise (brother)

Michael Robert DeLuise (born August 4, 1969) is an American former actor, film director, and film producer best known as Tony Piccolo in seaQuest DSV (1994–1996), Officer Joey Penhall in 21 Jump Street (1990–1991), and TJ in Gilmore Girls (2004–2007).

== Early life, family and education ==
Michael DeLuise was born on August 4, 1969, in Los Angeles, California, the second son of actor and comedian Dom DeLuise and actress Carol Arthur. Michael's brothers are actor, writer, director Peter DeLuise and actor David DeLuise.

== Career ==
DeLuise had a few bit roles as a youngster, and some additional roles as a teenager. He made his film debut in 1979 opposite his father in the comedy Hot Stuff. As a teen, he was a series regular on the Danny Thomas vehicle, the syndicated sitcom One Big Family.

He decided to pursue acting as a career after spending six months backpacking through Europe following his high school graduation.

Beginning in 1990, he played Officer Joey Penhall on the Fox TV series 21 Jump Street. His character was the younger brother of his brother Peter DeLuise's character, Officer Doug Penhall. He and Peter were also on SeaQuest DSV, where Michael played Tony Piccolo from 1994 to 1996. He made recurring appearances as TJ on the TV series Gilmore Girls and as Andy Sipowicz's older son on the TV series NYPD Blue. He has also made guest appearances on CSI: NY, Lost, and Stargate SG-1.

He played Alan, one of Wayne's headbanger friends in Wayne's World, and Matt Wilson, the school bully and primary villain in Encino Man.

DeLuise has not appeared on screen since 2013.

== Filmography ==
Film
Year	Film	Role	Notes
1979	Hot Stuff	Boy With Fish	
1991	Little Secrets	Pizza Delivery Boy	
1992	Wayne's World	Alan	
1992	Encino Man	Matt Wilson	Alternative title: California Man
1992	Stringer	-	Director
1992	Almost Pregnant	-	Director
1993	The Man Without a Face	Douglas Hall	
1994	Midnight Edition	Darryl Weston	
1996	The Shot	Bob Mann	
1999	Hard Time: The Premonition	Dee	Alternative title: The Premonition
2001	Discord	Billy Dunbarton	
2002	The Master of Disguise	Businessman	
2003	Between the Sheets	The Real Director	Director, producer
2005	Comedy Hell		
2007	He Was a Quiet Man	Detective Soreson	
2008	Patsy	Carl	
2008	Circle	Bill	
2009	The Shift	The Film Maker	
Television
Year	Title	Role	Notes
1983	Happy		Television movie
1985	Amazing Stories	Boyfriend	1 episode
1986	One Big Family	Brian Hatton	Unknown episodes
1988	Eisenhower and Lutz	Jay Warner	2 episodes
1988	My Two Dads	Mitch	1 episode
1989	One of the Boys	Luke Lukowski	1 episode
1989	TV 101	Stoner #2	1 episode
1989	Class Cruise	Boz Crenshaw	Television movie
1988 and 1990–1991	21 Jump Street	Teenage Doug Penhall / Officer Joey Penhall	12 episodes
1990	L.A. Law	Keith Haas	1 episode
1990	Sunset Beat	Officer Tim Kelly	Television movie
1990	Sunset Beat	Officer Tim Kelly	2 episodes
1993	Rio Shannon	Patrick Cleary	Television movie
1993	Tales from the Crypt	Sparks	1 episode
1993–2000	NYPD Blue	Andy Sipowicz Jr.	12 episodes
1994–1996	seaQuest DSV	Tony Piccolo	34 episodes
1997	Boys Will Be Boys	Skip Larue	Television movie
1997–1998	Brooklyn South	Officer Phil Roussakoff	22 episodes
1998	3rd Rock from the Sun	Paulie Pollone	1 episode
2001	Some of My Best Friends	Pino Palumbo	3 episodes
2001	Stargate SG-1	Nick Marlowe / Colonel Danning	1 episode
2003	The Dan Show	Patrick Kennedy	Television movie
2004	Las Vegas	Harry	1 episode
2004	Lost	David	1 episode "Confidence Man"
2004–2007	Gilmore Girls	T.J.	13 episodes
2005	Bloodsuckers	Gilles	Television movie Alternative title: Vampire Wars: Battle for the Universe
2005–2006	CSI: NY	Sonny Sassone	2 episodes
2013	Bunheads	Joe "Jo-Jo" Deline	1 episode
Music Videos
Year	Title	Role	Notes
2000	Goodbye Earl	Cop	By The Dixie Chicks
