= In questo mondo di ladri (film) =

- Directed by: Carlo Vanzina
- Written by: Carlo Vanzina; Enrico Vanzina; Claudio Pallottini; Piero De Bernardi
- Produced by: Vittorio Cecchi Gori
- Starring: Carlo Buccirosso; Valeria Marini; Biagio Izzo; Enzo Iacchetti; Max Pisu
- Edited by: Luca Montanari
- Production company: Cecchi Gori Group
- Distributed by: Variety Distribution (Italy); Miramax (Select territories)
- Release date: 29 October 2004
- Running time: 92 minutes
- Country: Italy
- Language: Italian

In questo mondo di ladri (lit. 'In this world of thieves') is a 2004 Italian comedy film directed by Carlo Vanzina.

== Cast ==
- Carlo Buccirosso as Fabio Di Nardo
- Valeria Marini as Monica Puddu
- Biagio Izzo as Nicola
- Enzo Iacchetti as Lionello
- Max Pisu as Walter
- Ricky Tognazzi as Mr. Gastone
- Leo Gullotta as Colonel Leonardo
- Mariella Valentini as Emma Di Nardo
- Daniele Bettini as Giacomino Di Nardo
- Nicola Pistoia as Sironi
