= The Good Bad Guy =

1997 Italian-American comedy film

- Italian theatrical release poster
- Italian: Killer per caso
- Directed by: Ezio Greggio
- Written by: Ezio Greggio; Rudy De Luca
- Produced by: Ezio Greggio
- Starring: Ezio Greggio; Jessica Lundy
- Cinematography: Massimo Zeri
- Edited by: Marc Grossman
- Music by: John Dickson
- Distributed by: Medusa Film (Italy)
- Release date: 26 January 1997 (Italy)
- Running time: 102 minutes
- Countries: Italy; United States
- Languages: English; Italian
- Box office: $0.7 million (Italy)

The Good Bad Guy (Italian: Killer per caso) is a 1997 Italian-American comedy film directed by Ezio Greggio.

== Plot ==
Joe Fortunato is an Italian petty thief who flees to New York to escape the criminal underworld. While on the run, he accidentally steals a hitman's car, resulting in a case of mistaken identity that leads to a multi-million dollar offer for a hit. In his attempt to pull off the job, however, he unwittingly becomes a hero and even finds love.

== Cast ==
- Ezio Greggio as Joe Fortunato
- Jessica Lundy as Carol Graham
- Rudy De Luca as Vince
- Carmine Caridi as Tony Fusciacca
- Dom DeLuise as the Judge
- Ron Carey as Robert Lambert
- Pat Asanti as Sergeant O'Neill
- Ronnie Schell as Chief Harrison
- Carol Arthur as Liza
- Adam Tomei as a policeman
- Jack Carter as a driver
- Alissa A. Nichols as a girl

== Reception ==
The film opened on 58 screens in Italy and grossed $323,173 for the weekend, ranking seventh at the Italian box office.
