= Sbamm! =

- Directed by: Francesco Abussi
- Written by: Francesco Abussi; Ezio Greggio
- Starring: Ezio Greggio; Valeria D'Obici; El Pasador; Cristina Moffa
- Cinematography: Sergio Martinelli
- Edited by: Roberto Sterbini
- Music by: El Pasador
- Release date: 1980
- Running time: 82 minutes
- Country: Italy
- Language: Italian

Sbamm! is a 1980 Italian comedy film directed by Francesco Abussi, starring Ezio Greggio.

== Cast ==
- Ezio Greggio as Pallone
- Valeria D'Obici as Pallone's girlfriend
- El Pasador as the record producer
- Cristina Moffa as the tourist guide
- Umberto Carollo as Quercia
