= Gina Nemo =

American poet

- Born: March 22, 1965 (age 60); Manhattan, New York, U.S.
- Occupations: Actress, singer, executive producer, writer, director, marketing executive, poet
- Years active: 1987–present
- Spouse: Peter DeLuise (m. 1988; div. 1992)
- Father: Henry Nemo

Gina Nemo (born March 22, 1965) is an American actress, singer, author, and marketing executive who had an award-winning role as Dorothy Pezzino in the American television series 21 Jump Street in the 1980s. She is the daughter of jazz musician Henry Nemo.

== Early years ==
Born in Manhattan, Nemo was raised in Pacific Palisades, California by her father and grandmother Annetta Holt. Nemo's mother died when she was eight years old. Nemo wrote poetry and songs and performed in school musicals and plays. Starting at age four, she performed in television commercials, holiday specials and televised dance shows on major television networks.

== Music career ==
Nemo began her singing career at Stepping Tone Records, an Indie record label in Hollywood. In the early 1990s, she formed the band "22 Nemo", performing concerts in the Hollywood area along the Sunset Strip and at private functions. She also produced an album for an indie Label in Buffalo, New York, but it was never released.

In 1999, Nemo produced and released the alternative pop/rock album Plastic Wonderland on her own record label, Omen Records. Several songs from this album were used in indie films and promotional campaigns for the television show Stargate SG-1. Her next musical venture was Waiting, an EP recorded in the UK (2009). She then released Cicada, an electronica dance music album from her company G Plan Music, G Plan Media in 2014.

== Music/marketing executive ==
Nemo later became a marketing executive for Universal Records and Sony/Epic,. She eventually became an independent public relations/marketing company for musical artists, music labels, entertainment companies and small businesses.

Nemo serves as a singer, writer, director, producer and marketing consultant for G Plan Media. She also produces commercials, television marketing campaigns, television pilots and documentaries. Her other production company, Omen Fiction, Inc, has produced campaigns for Sony Corporation, and advertising promos and television pilots.

== Personal life ==
Nemo was married to Peter DeLuise from 1988 to 1992 (he was a costar on 21 Jump Street). She was also married to British producer J. Page from 1995 to 2010. Nemo and Page had two children.

== Discography ==
- Henry Nemo Tribute (with Billy Vera) (2019 EP)
- Cicada (2014)
- Waiting...with Bohemia Road (2009)
- Plastic Wonderland (1999)

== Books ==
- 22 Love Poems (2017)
- GINA NEMO: Book of Haikus (2016)
- Carousel (2015)
- Scarlet (2014)
- Strings (2013)
