= The Silence of the Hams =

1994 film

- Theatrical release poster
- Directed by: Ezio Greggio
- Written by: Ezio Greggio
- Produced by: Julie Corman; Ezio Greggio
- Starring: Ezio Greggio; Dom DeLuise; Billy Zane; Joanna Pacuła; Charlene Tilton; Martin Balsam; Stuart Pankin; John Astin; Phyllis Diller; Bubba Smith; Larry Storch; Rip Taylor; Shelley Winters
- Cinematography: Jacques Haitkin
- Edited by: Robert Barrere; Andy Horvitch
- Music by: Parmer Fuller
- Production companies: Silvio Berlusconi Productions; 30th Century Wolf
- Distributed by: October Films
- Release date: 11 March 1994
- Running time: 81 minutes
- Countries: Italy; United States
- Language: English
- Budget: $3 million

The Silence of the Hams (Italian: Il Silenzio dei Prosciutti) is a 1994 comedy thriller film written by, directed by and starring Italian comedian Ezio Greggio. It is a parody of many popular thriller and horror films, notably The Silence of the Lambs and Psycho. Along with Greggio, it features an ensemble cast of Dom DeLuise, Billy Zane, Joanna Pacuła, Charlene Tilton and Martin Balsam.

Like many of its contemporary satires (including The Naked Gun), it is largely driven by wordplay, sight gags, running jokes, references to popular culture of the time (such as Michael Jackson's Thriller) and tongue-in-cheek references to then-current American politics (such as a fight scene between Presidents George H. W. Bush and Bill Clinton). Mel Brooks, who made a number of well regarded parodies (Blazing Saddles, Young Frankenstein, Spaceballs), makes a cameo appearance.

== Plot ==
The film follows rookie detective Jo Dee Fostar on his first case: apprehending a serial killer wanted for over 120 murders. To find the killer, Fostar enlists the help of convicted murderer Dr. Animal Cannibal Pizza. During the investigation, Fostar's girlfriend, Jane Wine is asked by her boss to take a large sum of money to the bank; instead, she leaves town with the money. She decides to hide out at the Cemetery Motel, which is revealed to be a cemetery named Motel after its owner, Antonio Motel. Jo must then enlist the help of Det. Martin Balsam and Dr. Pizza to find not only the murderer, but his missing girlfriend. This takes the cast on many adventures at the Cemetery Motel. In the final confrontation, most of the characters are revealed to be other people in disguise.

== Cast ==
- Ezio Greggio as Antonio Motel
- Dom DeLuise as Dr. Animal Cannibal Pizza
- Billy Zane as Jo Dee Fostar
- Joanna Pacuła as Lily Wine
- Charlene Tilton as Jane Wine
- Martin Balsam as Detective Martin Balsam
- Stuart Pankin as Inspector Pete Putrid
- John Astin as The Ranger
- Phyllis Diller as Old Secretary
- Bubba Smith as Olaf
- Larry Storch as Sergeant
- Rip Taylor as Mr. Laurel
- Shelley Winters as Mrs. Motel
- Nedra Volz as Ranger's Wife
- Andre Rosey Brown as Motorcycle Cop
- Henry Silva as Police Chief
- Marshall Bell as Cross-Dressing Agent
- Pat Rick as Bill Clinton
- Tony Cox as Jail Guard
- Joe Dante as Dying Man
- John Carpenter as Trench Coat Man
- Irwin Keyes as Gimp
- Eddie Deezen as Cameraman
- Ken Davitian as Luciano Pavaratti
- Peter DeLuise as Checkout Guard
- John Landis as FBI Agent
- David DeLuise as Policeman
- Al Ruscio as Phillip Morris
- Dom Irrera as Gas Attendant
- Lance Kinsey as Interrogator
- Shelly Desai as Trick
- Debra Christofferson as Misery Woman
- Rudy De Luca as Malicious Mel
- Jeff Celentano as Agent
- Raymond Serra as Agent Prostitute #1
- Daniel McVicar as Forensics Expert
- Wilhelm von Homburg as Maitre D'
- John Roarke as George H. W. Bush
- Lynn Shirey as Hillary Clinton
- Mel Brooks as Checkout Guest (uncredited)

== Critical response ==
The Silence of the Hams has widely received negative reviews from critics and has a 0% approval rating on review aggregate Rotten Tomatoes based on eight reviews.

Time Out London called it a "wholly redundant exercise", while Empire criticised it for "a script staggeringly bereft of humour or invention, and a clumsy, amateurish direction that seems largely concerned with focusing on Charlene Tilton's breasts".
