= Venice Medical =

- Genre: Short; Comedy
- Directed by: Hy Averback
- Starring: Carol Arthur; Michael Brandon; David Faustino; Ramón Franco; Rick Garcia; Elaine Giftos; Clara Perryman
- Music by: Jack Elliott
- Country of origin: United States
- Original language: English

Production
- Executive producers: Douglas S. Cramer; Aaron Spelling
- Producer: Jim Mulligan
- Cinematography: George Spiro Dibie

Original release
- Release: July 29, 1983

Venice Medical is a 1983 American television film. It was directed by Hy Averback.

== Cast ==
- Carol Arthur as Mrs. Baker
- Michael Brandon as Dr. Pete Marcus
- David Faustino as Terry Marcus
- Ramón Franco as Jorge
- Rick Garcia as Officer Montoya
- Elaine Giftos as Gwen Marcus
- Clara Perryman as Dr. Becky Warfield
- Rebecca Holden as Tawney
