= Enzo Iacchetti =

Italian actor, comedian and television presenter

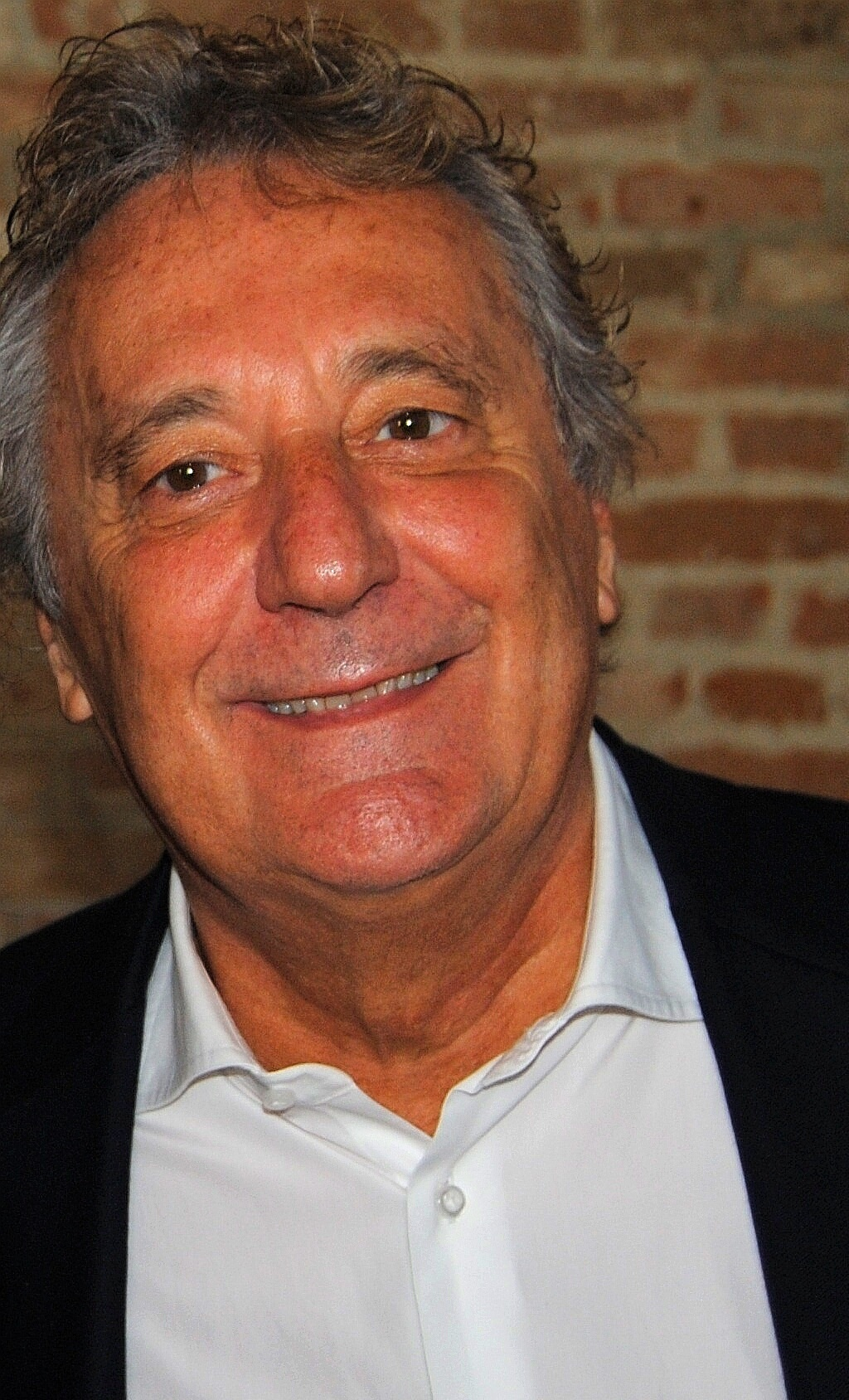
- Iacchetti in 2015
- Born: Vincenzo Iacchetti; 31 August 1952 (age 73); Castelleone, Italy
- Occupations: Stand-up comedian; actor; television presenter

Vincenzo "Enzo" Iacchetti (born 31 August 1952) is an Italian stand-up comedian, actor, television presenter and singer.

== Biography ==
Born in Castelleone, Iacchetti graduated in accounting and then made his apprenticeship as an entertainer performing in pizzerias and in restaurants in occasion of baptisms and weddings. In 1978 he was responsible for the programming of Radio Tresa, a little radio station in Lavena, also working as a speaker and an interviewer. In 1979 he moved to Milan, where he started performing at the Derby Club alongside other future successful comedians such as Giorgio Faletti and Francesco Salvi.

In 1981 Iacchetti made his television debut, playing a series of practical jokes for the RAI show Il Sabato dello Zecchino. After appearing in a number of other variety shows, he had his breakout in the early 1990s as a recurring guest in the Canale 5 talk show Maurizio Costanzo Show, where he became popular for his "bonsai" songs, very short humor songs usually lasting less than a minute whose lyrics were surrealistic and often nonsensical. Starting from 1994, Iacchetti got a large success as the presenter of the satirical Striscia la notizia, a role he reprised in the following seasons. In 1995, he made his debut as lead actor in the film Come quando fuori piove.

In 2009, he provided the voice for an amnesiac SpongeBob SquarePants in the Italian dub of the eponymous animated series' episode "What Ever Happened to SpongeBob?"

== Filmography ==
=== Films ===
Year	Title	Role(s)	Notes
1999	Screw Loose	Factory guard	Cameo appearance
1999	La grande prugna	Bart	
1999	Tifosi	Carlo Colombo	
2001	Our Tropical Island	Weather Man	
2001	Aida of the Trees	Kak	Italian dub; voice role
2003	Il segreto del successo	Himself	Cameo appearance
2004	In questo mondo di ladri	Mr. Lionello	
2008	Torno a vivere da solo	Ivano	
2009	L'ultimo crodino	Pes	
2012	Brave	Lord Macintosh	Italian dub; voice role
2013	Mi rifaccio vivo	Taxi driver	Cameo appearance
2015	Nuovo ordine mondiale	Minister Biancardi	

=== Television ===
Year	Title	Role(s)	Notes
1988–1989	Fate il vostro gioco	Himself / Co-host	Variety show
1989	Der lange Sommer	Stefano	Television film
1989–1990	Don Tonino	Lukas	Episode: "Delitto ad arte"
1989–1990	Don Tonino	Gioele	Episode: "Don Tonino e l'artiglio insanguinato"
1990–1999	Maurizio Costanzo Show	Himself / Regular guest	Talk show
1991–1992	Il TG delle vacanze	Himself / Reporter	Docureality
1992–1993	Dido…menica	Himself / Co-host	Variety show
1994–present	Striscia la notizia	Himself / Host	Satirical program (season 6–present)
1995	La stangata	Himself / Host	Variety show
1996–1997	Quei due sopra il varano	Enzo Riboldazzi	Lead role
1998	Da cosa nasce cosa	Pierfrancesco Delani	Television film
1998–2001	Quelli che... il Calcio	Himself / Recurring guest	Talk show
1999	Anni '60	Pino's nephew	Episode: "Episode 1"
2004	Benedetti dal Signore	Martino	Main role; also co-creator
2004–2008	Il mammo	Silvano Zerbi	Lead role
2005	Quelli dell'intervallo	Enzo Tinelli	2 episodes
2008	Marameo	Ottavio	Television film
2008	Medici miei	Dr. Enzo Zanetti	Lead role
2008	SpongeBob SquarePants	SpongeBob SquarePants (voice)	Episode: "What Ever Happened to SpongeBob?"
2009	Occhio a quei due	Edoardo Marchini	Television film
2018	Untraditional	Himself	Episode: "Come una corda"
