= The Wrestler (1974 film) =

- Theatrical release poster
- Directed by: Jim Westman
- Written by: Eugene Gump
- Produced by: W.R. Frank; Verne Gagne
- Starring: Ed Asner; Elaine Giftos; Verne Gagne; Billy Robinson
- Cinematography: Gil Hubbs
- Edited by: Neal Chastain
- Music by: William Loose
- Release date: February 1, 1974 (US)
- Running time: 95 minutes
- Country: United States
- Language: English

The Wrestler is a 1974 independent film directed by Jim Westman, produced by professional wrestler Verne Gagne and W.R. Frank, starring Ed Asner as Frank Bass, a wrestling promoter. Verne Gagne also stars in the film as Mike Bullard, the current wrestling champion of his "league". After a long reign as champion, Bullard is getting older and feeling pressure from all sides, including his wife and wrestling promoters, to pass the championship to Billy Taylor and retire. Bullard's resistance to their requests that he step aside is the central conflict in the film. The film presents professional wrestling as a truly competitive sport, always maintaining the illusion that matches are a result of athletic combat and not pre-determined outcomes decided before the matches.

At one point during the film, a number of wrestlers who had either died during a match or as a result of in-ring injuries are mentioned. That list of names was not fictional, but taken from the history of professional wrestling.

== Plot ==
Professional wrestling promoter Frank Bass (Ed Asner) has to deal with the pressures of running a professional wrestling promotion, facing the pressures of constantly finding new wrestlers to pull in the crowds, keeping the wrestlers he has under contract under control and especially dealing with the fact that the top man, the champion of "the League" Mike Bullard (Verne Gagne) is getting old and there is pressure to replace him with a younger wrestler. One such possible replacement is the latest challenger Billy Taylor (Billy Robinson). At one point, Bass meets with a number of other wrestling promoters (played by real life wrestling promoters from the National Wrestling Alliance, including Vincent J. McMahon) to possibly create a "Super Bowl of Wrestling". Facing pressure, Frank Bass decides to back Bullard as he faces the challenger Billy Taylor in the climax of the movie.

== Cast ==
- Ed Asner as Frank Bass
- Elaine Giftos as Debbie
- Verne Gagne as Mike Bullard
- Billy Robinson as Billy Taylor
- Sarah Miller as Betty Bullard
- Hard Boiled Haggerty as The Bartender
- Sam Menacker as The Mobster
- Harold Sakata as Odd Job
- Joe Scarpello as Jack Cutter

=== As themselves ===
The film features a number of actual wrestlers in the role of the various wrestlers throughout the movie, most of them worked for Verne Gagne's American Wrestling Association at the time The Wrestler was filmed. The Wrestler also mixed in footage from actual wrestling shows, creating the setting for the film while not being important to the actual plot of the film.

==== Wrestlers ====
- Jerry Wade
- Don Muraco
- James Blears
- Dan Hodge
- Joe Scarpello
- Dick Afflis as The Bruiser
- Dan Gable
- Reginald Lisowski as The Crusher
- Dusty Rhodes
- Wahoo McDaniel
- Joe Dusek
- Nick Bockwinkel
- Superstar Billy Graham
- Jay Hyon
- Ray Stevens
- Lawrence Batson
- Ric Flair
- Dick Murdoch
- Greg Gagne
- Larry Hennig
- Wilbur Snyder
- Bobby Cox
- Ken Patera
- Dennis Hilgart
- James Brunzell
- Horst Hoffman
- Fred Marxen
- Dave Goldson
- Jack Cornall
- Jack "Wildman" Armstrong
- Dory Funk Jr.
- Pedro Morales
- Mike Graham

==== Wrestling promoters ====
- Vincent J. McMahon
- Bill Crouch
- Eddie Graham
- Wally Karbo
- Rod Trongard

==== Other roles ====
- Mel Jass, announcer
- Marty O'Neil, announcer
- Rodger Kent, announcer
- James Klobuchar, sportswriter

== Production ==
The movie was filmed in Minnesota, with Saint Paul's historic Landmark Center serving as the location of Frank Bass (Ed Asner)'s office.

== Critical reception ==
Variety noted, "Technical credits are so-so, offering nothing out of the ordinary ... Box-office potential appears fair for this low budgeter because of the vast following pro wrestling enjoys, but hefty ballyhooing will be needed." Gene Siskel of the Chicago Tribune gave the film two stars out of four, calling it "as predictable as, well, a wrestling match ... All of the material outside the ring seems phony compared to the real phoniness inside the ropes." Jill Forbes wrote in The Monthly Film Bulletin: "Designed to appeal mainly to the converted, The Wrestler is not without its attractions for non-enthusiasts of the sport," adding that "the comic set-pieces really carry the film."

== See also ==
- List of American films of 1974
