= Elaine Giftos =

American actress

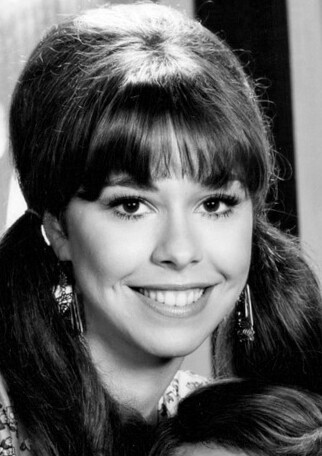
- Giftos in 1970
- Education: Pittsfield High School
- Occupations: Actress; dancer; model
- Years active: 1969–2001
- Known for: New York City Ballet; The Partridge Family; The Interns; Love, American Style
- Spouse: Herbert Wright (m. 1973; died 2005)
- Website: elainegiftoswright.com

Elaine Giftos is an American retired model, actress, and dancer.

== Early life ==
The daughter of Mr. and Mrs. Charles P. Giftos, she attended Pittsfield High School.

While working as a fashion model in New York, Giftos was selected by the Clairol company as Miss Ultra Smooth in 1964. In this role, she traveled around the United States promoting the company's soothing lotion for shaving women's legs. Her work as a photographer's model resulted in photographs of her being used in Ingenue, Redbook, and Seventeen magazines.

== Career ==
Trained by George Balanchine as a member of the New York City Ballet, Giftos performed on Broadway in Leonard Sillman's New Faces of 1968 and Pousse-Café, then moved to California to pursue a career in movies and television.

Giftos' first television appearance was in an episode of I Dream of Jeannie ("Jeannie the Matchmaker") as a dating-service clerk. Other shows in which she appeared were Bonanza; My Three Sons; The Interns; Ironside; Adam-12; Love, American Style; The Streets of San Francisco; The Paul Lynde Show; The Partridge Family in a recurring role as Reuben Kinkcaid's girlfriend Bonnie Kleinschmidt; Kolchak: The Night Stalker; The Bob Newhart Show; The Six Million Dollar Man; Otherworld; Barney Miller; Three's Company; Hawaii Five-O; Quincy, M.E.; Knight Rider; Magnum, P.I.; Murder, She Wrote; Tales of the Unexpected; War of the Worlds; Ally McBeal; Mars and Beyond and Family Law.

Her movie credits include roles in On a Clear Day You Can See Forever (1970); The Student Nurses (1970); Gas-s-s-s (1970, as the female lead Cilla); No Drums, No Bugles (1972); Everything You Always Wanted to Know About Sex* (*But Were Afraid to Ask) (1972); The Wrestler (1974); Paternity (1981); Angel (1984); and The Trouble with Dick (1987).

== Personal life ==
Giftos was married to writer/producer Herbert Wright until his death in 2005.

Since 1989, Giftos Wright has provided consulting services for feng shui under the name The Wright Way of Feng Shui.

== Filmography ==
=== Film ===
Year	Title	Role	Notes
1970	On a Clear Day You Can See Forever	Muriel	Comedy drama fantasy film
1970	The Student Nurses	Sharon	Drama film
1970	Gas! -Or- It Became Necessary to Destroy the world in Order to Save It.	Cilla	Comedy drama science fiction film
1972	No Drums, No Bugles		War film
1972	Everything You Always Wanted to Know About Sex* (*But Were Afraid to Ask)	Mrs. Ross	
1974	The Wrestler	Debbie	Action crime film
1981	Paternity	Woman in Oak Room Bar	Comedy romance film
1984	Angel	Patricia Allen	Action crime thriller film
1987	The Trouble with Dick	Sheila	Comedy science fiction film
1989	Another Time, Another Place	Winky Heinson	
1995	Body Chemistry IV: Full Exposure	Charlotte Sanders	Thriller film
2000	Mars and Beyond	NASA Oversight Officer Gennifer Gianni	Short science fiction film

=== Television ===
Year	Title	Role	Notes
1969	I Dream of Jeannie	Laverne Sedelko	Episode: "Jeannie, the Matchmaker"
1970	Bonanza	Charley (uncredited); Charity McGill	Episode: "The Trouble with Amy"; Episode: "The Lady and the Mark"
1970-1971	The Interns	Bobbe Marsh	24 episodes
1971	Cade's County	Eleanor Jameson	Episode: "Safe Deposit"
1971	Ironside	Stephie Parker	Episode: "Murder Impromptu"
1972	My Three Sons	Jewel Marsenick	Episode: "Lonesome Katie"
1972	Adam-12	Kathy Stephens	Episode: "Lost and Found"
1972	Temperatures Rising	Nina	Episode: "The Muscle and the Medic"
1972	The Streets of San Francisco	Irene Jepsen	Episode: "Timelock"
1972	The Bob Newhart Show	Cynthia Fremont	Episode: "Anything Happen While I Was Gone?"
1972	Banyon	Verna	Episode: "The Lady Killer"
1972	Cool Million	Kahadija Messadi	Episode: "The Million Dollar Misunderstanding"
1973	The Paul Lynde Show	Judy Murdock	Episode: "Is This Trip Necessary?"
1971-1973	Love, American Style	Susan; Elizabeth; Karen Smith; Gwen	(segment "Love and the Second Time") (segment "Love and the Awakening (segment "Love and the Family Hour" (segment "Love and the Single Husband"
1972-1973	The Partridge Family	Bonnie Kleinschmidt	Episode: "Home Is Where the Heart Was"; Episode: "Bedknobs and Drumsticks"; Episode: "Reuben Kincaid Lives"; Episode: "Double Trouble"
1973	Chase	Gloria	Episode: "The Garbage Man"
1974	The New Perry Mason	Shelby Danton	Episode: "The Case of the Tortured Titan"
1974	Kolchak: The Night Stalker	Nurse Janis Eisen	Episode: "The Energy Eater"
1975	The Secret Night Caller	Chloe	TV film
1973-1975	Marcus Welby, M.D.	Melanie Gates; Doris	Episode: "The Problem with Charlie"; Episode: "Save the Last Dance for Me"
1975	Ladies of the Corridor	Betsy Ames	TV film
1975	Cannon	Margaret Hatt	Episode: "To Still the Voice"
1977	Stonestreet: Who Killed the Centerfold Model?	Arlene	TV film
1978	The Six Million Dollar Man	Emily	Episode: "Date with Danger: Part 1"; Episode: "Date with Danger: Part 2"
1979	Breaking Up Is Hard to Do	Tina Scapa	TV film
1979	Quincy, M.E.	Loxie Adams	Episode: "Hot Ice"
1980	Barney Miller	Laura Kiergo	Episode: "Vanished: Part 1"; Episode: "Vanished: Part 2"
1976-1980	Hawaii Five-O	Janice Lockman Lily Kalima; Anne Chernus	Episode: "The Last of the Great Paperhangers"; Episode: "The Friends of Joey Kalima"; Episode: "Clash of Shadows"
1981	Number 96	Hildy	Episode: "Father's Day"
1981	Through the Magic Pyramid	Nefertiti	TV film
1982	Games Mother Never Taught You		TV film
1980-1982	Three's Company	Darlene; Randy	Episode: "A Hundred Dollars a What?"; Episode: "An Affair to Forget"
1982	Magnum, P.I.	Ginger Leah Grant	Episode: "Mixed Doubles"
1983	Venice Medical	Gwen Marcus	TV film
1983	Matt Houston	Nikki Sheffield	Episode: "The Centerfold Murders"
1982-1984	Trapper John, M.D.	Katie Miller	Episode: "Ladies in Waiting"; Episode: "Special Delivery"
1985	Knight Rider	Debra Sands	Episode: "Custom Made Killer"
1985	Murder, She Wrote	Lonnie Valerian	Episode: "Broadway Malady"
1985	Otherworld	Belisama	Episode: "I Am Woman, Hear Me Roar"
1985	Tales of the Unexpected	Grace	Episode: "In the Cards"
1986	Blacke's Magic	Agent Joanna Kelsey	Episode: "Last Flight from Moscow"
1987	What a Country!	Danny the Bartender	Episode: "The Road from Morocco"
1989	War of the Worlds	Q'Tara	Episode: "The Angel of Death"
1989-1990	Dragnet	Joan Randall; Martha Lester	Episode: "The Connection"; Episode: "Family Affair"
1998	Ally McBeal	Nancy Foote	Episode: "Forbidden Fruits"
2001	Family Law	U.S. Attorney Annette Hodge	Episode: "Liar's Club: Part 1"
