= The Godson (film) =

1998 film

- Directed by: Bob Hoge
- Written by: Bob Hoge
- Produced by: Morris Ruskin; Jeff Ritchie; Kevin Flint
- Starring: Rodney Dangerfield; Kevin McDonald; Dom DeLuise; Fabiana Udenio; Lou Ferrigno
- Production company: Shoreline Entertainment
- Release date: 1998
- Running time: 100 minutes
- Country: United States
- Language: English

The Godson is a 1998 American crime comedy film directed by Bob Hoge and starring Rodney Dangerfield, Kevin McDonald and Dom DeLuise. The film is a parody of The Godfather film series and Scarface, as well as other gangster films that were popular in the 1970s, 1980s, and 1990s.

== Plot ==
The head of the Calzone mob family sends his son to "Mafia University." The head of a rival crime family sees this as an opportunity to bring the Calzones to their knees.

== Cast ==
- Rodney Dangerfield as "The Rodfather"
- Kevin McDonald as "Guppy" Calzone (credited as Kevin Hamilton McDonald)
- Dom DeLuise as "The Oddfather"
- Fabiana Udenio as Don Na
- Lou Ferrigno as "Bugsy" / Alice
- Paul Greenberg as Frito Calzone
- Carol DeLuise as Mama Calzone (credited as Carol Arthur)
- Barbara Crampton as Goldy
- Bob Hoge as Sunny Calzone (credited as Bob 'The Sicilian Salami' Hoge)
- Pat Crawford Brown as Toenail Lady
- Bobbie Brown as Sunny's Babe

== Reception ==
As it is a direct-to-video release, there were few critical reviews. The soundtrack features music from Del Noah and the Mt. Ararat Finks with Eric Wilson of Sublime on double bass.
