= What Ever Happened to SpongeBob? =

- SpongeBob SquarePants episode
- Promotional artwork for the episode depicting a scene where SpongeBob is in New Kelp City with the Bubble Poppin' Boys gang about to assault him.
- Episode no.: Season 5 Episode 18
- Directed by: Alan Smart (animation and supervising); Tom Yasumi (animation); Casey Alexander (storyboard); Zeus Cervas (storyboard)
- Written by: Casey Alexander; Zeus Cervas; Steven Banks
- Production code: 151-535/151-536
- Original air date: October 13, 2008
- Running time: 22 minutes

Guest appearance
- Ray Liotta as the Bubble Poppin Boys Leader

Episode chronology
← Previous "The Battle of Bikini Bottom"	Next → "The Two Faces of Squidward"
- SpongeBob SquarePants (season 5)

"What Ever Happened to SpongeBob?" (alternatively titled "WhoBob WhatPants?" and "SpongeBob in WhoBob WhatPants?") is the 18th episode of the fifth season of the American animated television series SpongeBob SquarePants, and the 98th episode overall. It first aired on Nickelodeon in the United States on October 13, 2008.

In the episode, SpongeBob thinks that his friends do not like him anymore after he made them angry because of a few accidents and decides to leave Bikini Bottom. Along the way, he accidentally bumps his head and loses his memory. SpongeBob wanders away into a new place called New Kelp City and attempts to get a new job, unaware he is becoming a target for a criminal gang known as the Bubble Poppin' Boys, while Patrick, Sandy and a reluctant Squidward try to find him.

The episode was written by Casey Alexander, Zeus Cervas, and Steven Banks, and the animation was directed by supervising director Alan Smart and Tom Yasumi. The episode features a guest appearance by Ray Liotta as the voice of the leader of the Bubble Poppin' Boys. The episode's premiere pulled an average of 7.7 million viewers, but received mixed to negative reviews from critics.

== Plot summary ==
SpongeBob wakes up on a normal day as usual, hoping to have a good day. However, a series of bad events happen throughout the day: he accidentally breaks Gary's shell when hugging him too hard, accidentally crushes a cake Patrick made for his mother's birthday, accidentally disturbs Squidward's beauty sleep, accidentally destroys Sandy's new robot or her invention, and accidentally deep-fries Mr. Krabs and two of his dollar bills. Each of these is met with SpongeBob being thrown out and angrily called "IDIOT BOY" by all of his friends.

A devastated SpongeBob, believing none of his friends like him anymore and want him out of town, decides to leave Bikini Bottom permanently. He leaves Gary with food and, without telling anyone else, walks out of town with a blanket-on-a-stick of supplies. That night, however, SpongeBob gets spooked in the dark and runs off a cliff, repeatedly bumping his head on the cliff rocks and getting knocked unconscious. Back in Bikini Bottom, Sandy and Patrick find a goodbye note from SpongeBob inside his pineapple and, feeling remorseful, show it to Mr. Krabs and Squidward. To make matters worse, without SpongeBob making Krabby Patties at the Krusty Krab, the city breaks out into massive chaos. The four resolve to retrieve SpongeBob. To this end, Sandy creates a sea sponge locator device, only for Squidward, having no intention of finding SpongeBob, to smash it with a mallet. Angered by this, Mr. Krabs bribes Squidward to find SpongeBob on foot by promising him a Fabergé egg as a reward, accompanied by Patrick and Sandy.

Meanwhile, SpongeBob wakes up with amnesia. He sees a couple of tramp fish, who deem him "CheeseHead BrownPants" to steal his possessions, leaving him with only a bottle of bubble soap in his pants. SpongeBob eventually wanders into New Kelp City, a dilapidated urban city, where he attempts to get a job. Each time he does, he displays his bubble-blowing ability, but this strikes fear into all the residents of the city and results in his termination. Late that night, his activity brings up a confrontation with "the Bubble Poppin' Boys", a gang of greasers. They explain that having developed an unreasonable hatred against bubbles for blinding them upon popping in their eyes, and they have spent the last two decades killing anyone who blows bubbles, resulting in their unofficial ban and the city's downfall. The gang chases SpongeBob, who eventually defeats them by trapping them in a bubble that carries them out of the city forever. He is rewarded by getting the position of mayor of New Kelp City.

While on the road, Squidward's group learns about SpongeBob's mayoral appointment, but when they go to New Kelp City to retrieve him, SpongeBob cannot remember who they are and brushes them off. They manage to kidnap SpongeBob and return him to the Krusty Krab, but he still rejects them. Squidward celebrates this, only to slip on a spatula and throws the Fabergé egg onto SpongeBob's head, restoring his memory. SpongeBob is then given an apology from his friends for running him out of town. Although he forgives them, SpongeBob still decides to return to New Kelp City since the city still needs its mayor. At that moment, a breaking news report comes on, saying that the bubbles in New Kelp City are blinding the citizens, who blame SpongeBob. This finally makes SpongeBob change his mind, and he says that he will stay in Bikini Bottom. Before the episode ends, Squidward opens his head and throws his brain into the trash can.

== Production ==
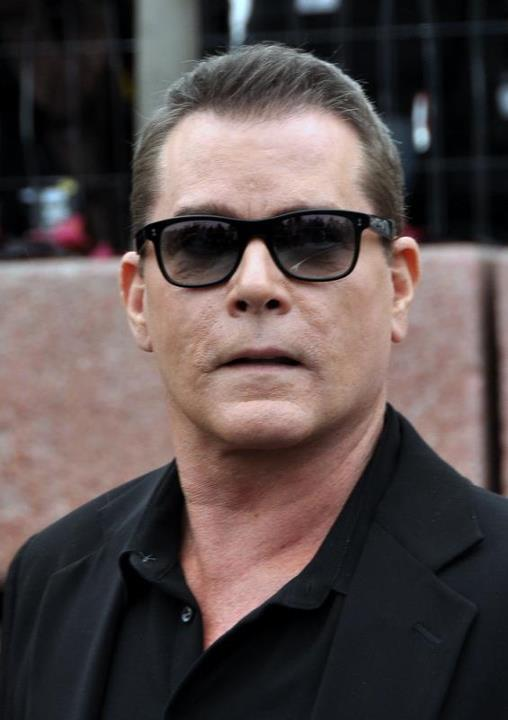
Ray Liotta guest starred in the episode.

"What Ever Happened to SpongeBob?", also known as "WhoBob WhatPants?", was a special episode written by Casey Alexander, Zeus Cervas, and Steven Banks. The animation and supervising director was Alan Smart. Alexander and Cervas also functioned as storyboard directors. The episode was first announced by Nickelodeon on September 24, 2008, on a press release. According to the network, SpongeBob "wanders the ocean, a stranger in his own pants," and finds himself in a rough part of New Kelp City, where he faces off against the Boys' gangleader, Liotta's character.

The episode originally aired in the United States on October 13, 2008. From October 3, 2008, TurboNick featured a special playlist of content dedicated to the episode, including a sneak-peek of the special, themed episodes, short-form content, song clips, and an instant replay of the special following the television premiere. Nick.com, on October 2, 2008, presented an online game called "SpongeBob SquarePants: WhoBob WhatPants???" to celebrate the episode's television airing. The episode also features SpongeBob's signature sea chanty altered to "WhoBob WhatPants?" during the chorus answers in the title sequence.

In addition to the regular cast, the late Ray Liotta guest starred in the episode as the voice of the leader of New Kelp City's Bubble Poppin' Boys gang, and the main villain in the episode.

On October 14, 2008, "What Ever Happened to SpongeBob?" became available in the DVD compilation called SpongeBob's WhoBob WhatPants, along with six other episodes including "Goo Goo Gas", "The Two Faces of Squidward", "SpongeHenge", "Banned in Bikini Bottom", and "Stanley S. SquarePants". It also became available in the SpongeBob SquarePants: Season 5, Vol. 2 DVD on November 18, 2008. On September 22, 2009, "What Ever Happened to SpongeBob?" was released on the SpongeBob SquarePants: The First 100 Episodes DVD, alongside all the episodes of seasons one through five.

== Reception ==
"What Ever Happened to SpongeBob?" was viewed by 7.7 million audiences. This ranked the program the number one most viewed entertainment show of the night, and the number two most viewed show in all categories after ESPN Monday Night Football.

Despite the high ratings, the episode received mixed-to-negative reviews from critics. Maxie Zeus of Toon Zone cited the episode as an example of the series' decline. Lesley Aeschliman of Yahoo! Voices wrote, "I have to look at this special like the 'Friend or Foe?' special. While 'WhoBob WhatPants?' works well as a regular story for SpongeBob SquarePants, I'm not entirely convinced that it deserved to be hyped up as a special. While this story had the potential to be 'special material,' it just didn't materialize in the final produced product." Roy Hrab of DVD Verdict said, "It makes me sad to think about how something so pleasurable has declined into something so tedious." Paul Mavis of DVD Talk said, "With a laugh-skimpy script, 'What Ever Happened to SpongeBob?' may be confirming a trend I noticed back with the last original SpongeBob toon to get its own disc release, Pest of the West: SpongeBob shorts are starting to get tired. And 'What Ever Happened to SpongeBob?' is even less funny than 'Pest of the West'," adding the episode was "Not a good sign." Maddy Pumila was more positive, saying that the episode was "extremely fun and entertaining. I hadn't watched SpongeBob in a while, but the laughs in this episode provided more laughs than I would get in an entire day."
