= James Murdoch (singer) =

Canadian rock singer-songwriter

- Born: James Alex Murdoch; Whitehorse, Yukon, Canada
- Origin: Edmonton, Alberta, Canada
- Genres: pop rock, folk rock
- Occupation: Singer-songwriter
- Label: Shameless Records
- Website: jamesmurdochband.com

James Murdoch is a Canadian rock singer-songwriter. He has released five full-length albums. Murdoch is a multi-instrumentalist, playing guitar, piano, mandolin, banjo and singing on his records, which he often helps produce himself. His 2007 release, In Transit, was co-produced by compatriot Hawksley Workman.

Born in Whitehorse, Yukon, Murdoch now resides in Edmonton, Alberta. Murdoch has been described as a "Canadian John Mayer," and his sound has been compared to that of rock groups Blue Rodeo and Crowded House.

== Biography ==
Murdoch was born into an entertainment-oriented family; his father and uncles were writers and actors and his mother was both a concert producer and art director. He began playing music at an early age; at six, he could play the piano and guitar, and he first performed on national radio when he was just eight years old. By the time he was fourteen, Murdoch was touring northern Canada with numerous musicians and groups. He had released several albums with various bands by the time he graduated from high school. After traveling across North America and briefly settling in Victoria, British Columbia he found himself in Edmonton, where he now lives and runs a recording studio, Norwood Studio, with Captain Tractor frontman Chris Wynters. Murdoch has stated that one of his biggest musical influences is the Blue Rodeo album Five Days in July (1984). "Every time I put it on, I feel a sense of inspiration and comfort," he explains. "I always want to pick up my guitar when I hear it and just write. I've played music for over 10 years, starting in rock bands like many do, but I was always drawn to want to write in the sweet, melodic mystery of Five Days. When I finally started to do my solo thing, that record lent me the motivation to move toward the folk-pop style that I now attempt to pursue." Murdoch ended up working with Blue Rodeo producer John Whynot in 2005.

His debut album, Polyphonic, earned him a Pop Album of the Year nod at the 2002 Prairie Music Awards. He has been nominated for several Western Canadian Music Awards, including three nominations in 2008 for his album In Transit: Outstanding Pop Recording, Video of the Year and Best Album Design, for the artwork designed by Nick Perreault, whom Murdoch toured with in the fall of 2008. In Transit took almost three years to write and record; it was recorded and scrapped twice before Hawksley Workman was brought in to work on a third version of the record with Murdoch, and that version saw eventual release in the fall of 2007.

In the fall of 2008 James was released from his contract with Indica Records allowing him to independently self-record and produce his latest album, Wondering Where The Rush Has Gone. The album, the first released as the James Murdoch Band, marked a return to working with John Whynot, who mixed and mastered it. The album is rootsier than his previous efforts and was largely recorded live off the floor. It was released 9 June 2009 on Shameless Records.

== The James Murdoch Band ==
Murdoch has recorded all his four albums with his band; together they are known as the James Murdoch Band. His band accompanies him on most tours.

- James Murdoch – lead vocals, guitar (both electric and acoustic), songwriting, mandolin, banjo
- Darcy Johnstone – bass guitar and background vocals
- Chris Budnarchuk – drums and background vocals
- David Aide – piano, organ, accordion
- Nathan Carroll – guitar, pedal steel, and background vocals

== Discography ==
- Polyphonic (2002)
- Between the Lines (2005)
- Postcards EP (2006)
- In Transit (2007)
- Wondering Where The Rush Has Gone (2009)

== Videos ==
- "Believe" (2004, from Between the Lines)
- "Break Me Down" (2004, from Between the Lines)
- "Transportation" (2008, from In Transit)
