= Anne Marie DeLuise =

Canadian actress (born 1969)

- Born: Anne Marie Loder; August 3, 1969 (age 56); St. John's, Newfoundland and Labrador, Canada
- Occupation: Actress
- Years active: 1993–present
- Height: 5 ft 7 in (1.70 m)
- Spouse: Peter DeLuise (m. 2002)
- Children: 1
- Awards: Leo Award (2015)

Anne Marie DeLuise (née Loder) is a Canadian actress.

== Career ==
DeLuise has had a number of supporting roles in film and television. Her most notable roles are Dr. Greene in Fifty Shades of Grey and Mrs. Briggs on Strange Empire, a role which won her a Leo Award.

== Personal life ==
DeLuise is from St. John's, Newfoundland and Labrador, Canada. She is married to American actor and television director Peter DeLuise. They have one child.

== Filmography ==
- Family Pictures (1993)
- Kung Fu: The Legend Continues episode "Tournament" (1994)
- Janek: The Silent Betrayal (1994)
- Jungleground (1995)
- Darkman II: The Return of Durant (1995)
- Side Effects episode "Leave My Bum Alone" (1995)
- Goosebumps episode "The Haunted Mask: Part 1 & 2" (1995)
- Iron Eagle IV (1995)
- Christmas in My Hometown (1996)
- F/X: The Series episode "Get Fast" (1997)
- Eerie, Indiana: The Other Dimension episode "Young and the Twitchy" (1998)
- Reluctant Angel (1998)
- Sweet Deception (1998)
- Highlander: The Raven episode "Cloak & Dagger" (1998)
- Earth: Final Conflict episodes "Isabel" and "Atavus" (1998)
- Total Recall 2070 (1999)
- Due South (1997-1999)
- Black Light (1998)
- Sweet Lies (1999)
- Don't Look Behind You (1999)
- A Song From The Heart (1999)
- Code Name Eternity (1999)
- Y2K (1999)
- Quarantine (1999)
- First Wave episode "Night Falls" (2000)
- Seven Days episode "Rhino" (2000)
- Big Sound episode "You Bet Your Ass" (2000)
- Higher Ground (2000)
- Life-Size (2000)
- Stargate SG-1 episode "The Other Side" (2000)
- The Chris Isaak Show episode "Tomorrowland" (2001)
- The Outer Limits episode "Rule of Law" (2001)
- Mysterious Ways episode "Friends in Need" (2002)
- Just Deal episode "Happy Medium" (2002)
- The Twilight Zone episode "Future Trade" (2002)
- The Dead Zone episode "The Storm" (2003)
- Jinnah - On Crime: White Knight, Black Widow (2003)
- NTSB: The Crash of Flight 323 (2004)
- Andromeda episode "Trusting the Gordian Maze" and "Pitiless as the Sun" (2001–2004)
- The Collector episode "The Prosecutor" (2004)
- Dead Like Me episode "Haunted" (2004)
- Supernatural episode "Bugs" (2005)
- Engaged to Kill (2006)
- Shock to the System (2006)
- Psych episode "Woman Seeking Dead Husband: Smokers Okay, No Pets" (2006)
- Black Christmas (2006)
- Stargate SG-1 episode "Bounty" (2007)
- Painkiller Jane episode "Nothing to Fear But Fear Itself" (2007)
- Sabbatical (2007)
- Ace of Hearts (2008)
- Smile of April (2009)
- Charly (2009)
- The Thaw (2009)
- Fear Island (2009)
- The Troop episode "Do the Worm" (2009)
- Love Happens (2009)
- Sanctuary episode "Fragments" (2009)
- Frankie & Alice (2010)
- Pretty Little Liars episode "Pilot" (2010)
- Smallville (2006–2011)
- R.L. Stine's The Haunting Hour episode "My Sister the Witch" (2011)
- The Edge of the Garden (2011)
- Om Inc. (2011)
- Strange Empire 12 episodes (2014–2015)
- iZombie (2015)
- Fifty Shades of Grey (2015)
- When Calls the Heart 2 episodes (2016)

== Awards and nominations ==
| Year | Award | Category | Work | Result | Ref |
|---|---|---|---|---|---|
| 2015 | Leo Awards | Best Supporting Performance by a Female in a Dramatic Series | Strange Empire | Won | |
