= Dom DeLuise =

American actor (1933–2009)

- DeLuise in 1957
- Born: Dominick DeLuise; August 1, 1933; New York City, New York, U.S.
- Died: May 4, 2009 (aged 75); Santa Monica, California, U.S.
- Resting place: Calvary Cemetery
- Education: Tufts University
- Occupations: Actor; musician; comedian; director; chef; author
- Years active: 1951–2009
- Spouse: Carol Arthur (m. 1965)
- Children: Peter; Michael; David

Dominick DeLuise (August 1, 1933 – May 4, 2009) was an American actor, comedian, director, musician, chef, and author. Known primarily for comedic roles, he rose to fame in the 1970s as a frequent guest on television variety shows. He is widely recognized for his performances in the films of Mel Brooks and Gene Wilder, as well as a series of collaborations and a double act with Burt Reynolds. Beginning in the 1980s, his popularity expanded to younger audiences from voicing characters in several major animated productions, particularly those of Don Bluth.

== Early life ==
DeLuise was born in Brooklyn, New York, to Italian American parents Vincenza "Jennie" (née DeStefano), a homemaker, and John DeLuise, a public employee (NYC Sanitation ). He was the youngest of three children, having an older brother, Nicholas "Nick" DeLuise, and an older sister, Antoinette DeLuise-Daurio. He grew up in Bensonhurst, Brooklyn.

DeLuise graduated from Manhattan's High School of Performing Arts and later attended Tufts University in Medford, Massachusetts, where he majored in biology. DeLuise was Catholic and had a particular devotion to the Virgin Mary.

== Career ==
DeLuise's paid stage debut, at age 18, of Bernie the dog was in the drama Bernie's Christmas Wish. His first steady gig was as an intern at the Cleveland Play House, 1952–54, as stage manager and actor.

In 1961, DeLuise played in the off-Broadway musical revue Another Evening with Harry Stoons, which lasted nine previews and one performance. Another member of the cast was 19-year-old Barbra Streisand. He was also in the off-Broadway play All in Love, which opened on November 10, 1961, at the Martinique Theatre and ran for 141 performances. Other New York theater performances included Half-Past Wednesday (off-Broadway) (1962); Around the World in 80 Days (off-Broadway) (1963); The Student Gypsy (Broadway) (1963); Here's Love (Broadway) (1963); and Last of the Red Hot Lovers (Broadway) (1969).

DeLuise generally appeared in comedic parts, although an early appearance in the movie Fail-Safe as a nervous USAF technical sergeant showed a broader range. His first acting credit was as a regular performer in the television show The Entertainers in 1964. He gained early notice for his supporting turn in the Doris Day film The Glass Bottom Boat (1966). In his review in The New York Times, Vincent Canby panned the film but singled out the actor, stating, "[T]he best of the lot, however, is a newcomer, Dom DeLuise, as a portly, bird-brained spy."

In the 1970s and 1980s, he often co-starred with his real-life friend Burt Reynolds. Together they appeared in the films The Cannonball Run and Cannonball Run II, Smokey and the Bandit II, The End, and The Best Little Whorehouse in Texas. DeLuise was the host of the television show Candid Camera from 1991 to 1992. He was a mainstay of Burke's Law, an American television series that aired on CBS during the 1993–1994 and 1994–1995 television seasons.

DeLuise also lent his distinctive voice to various animated films and was a particular staple of Don Bluth's features, playing major roles in The Secret of NIMH, An American Tail, A Troll in Central Park and All Dogs Go to Heaven (also with Reynolds). All Dogs Go to Heaven also featured Reynolds' voice as Charlie B. Barkin and DeLuise voiced Itchy Itchiford, Charlie's best friend, wing-man and later partner in business. Unlike DeLuise, however, Reynolds did not contribute a voiceover to any of the eventual film or television series or sequels.

DeLuise also voiced the incarnation of Charles Dickens' Fagin in the Walt Disney film Oliver & Company and made voice guest appearances on several animated television series.

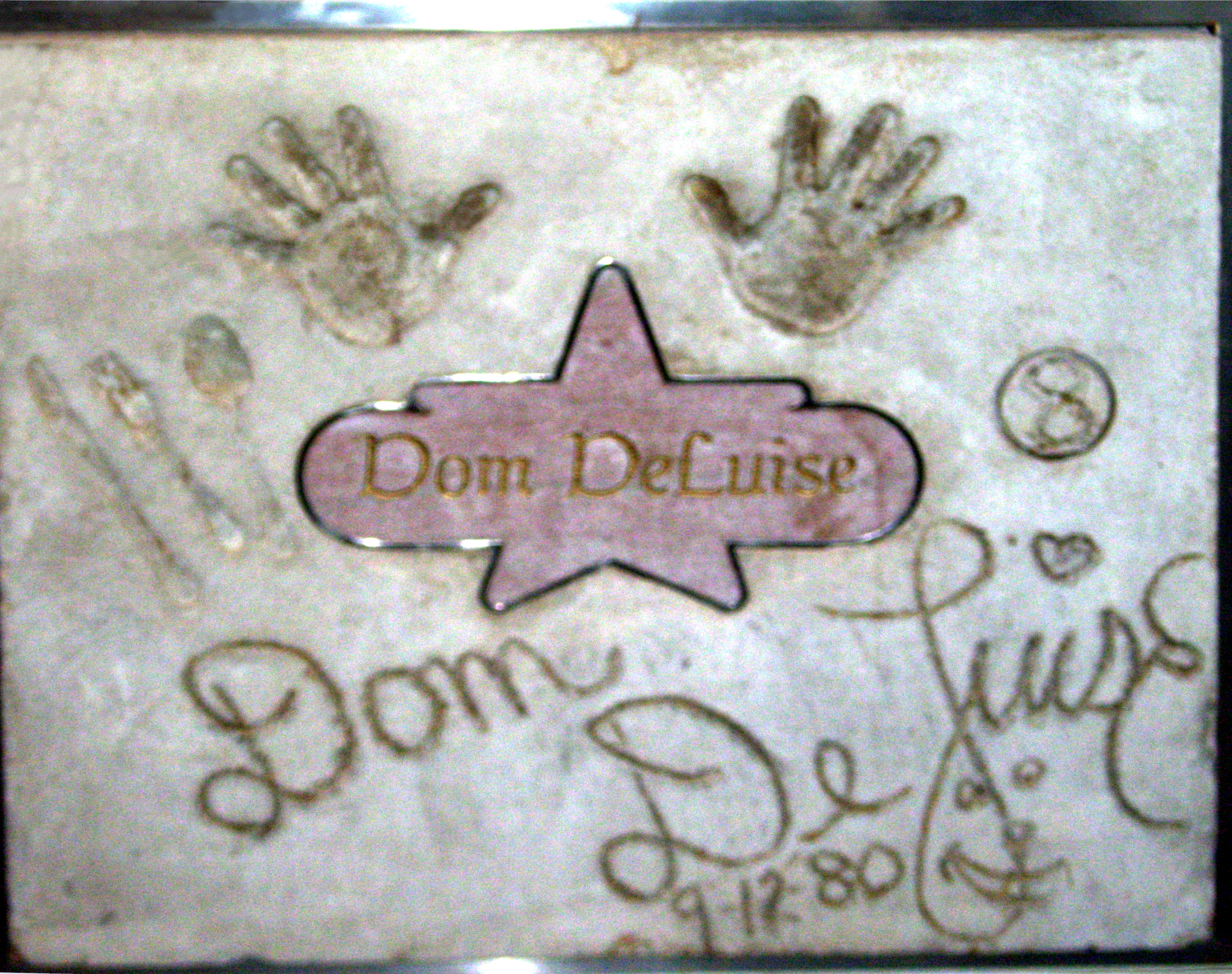
The handprints of Dom DeLuise in Atlantic City, New Jersey

Television producer Greg Garrison hired DeLuise to appear as a specialty act on The Dean Martin Show. DeLuise ran through his "Dominick the Great" routine, a riotous example of a magic act gone wrong, with host Martin as a bemused volunteer from the audience. Dom's catchphrase, with an Italian accent, was "No Applause Please, Save-a to the End". The show went so well that DeLuise was soon a regular on Martin's program, participating in both songs and sketches.

Garrison also featured DeLuise in his own hour-long comedy specials for ABC. (Martin was often off-camera when these were taped, and his distinctive laugh can be heard.)

In 1968, DeLuise hosted his own hour-long comedy variety series for CBS, The Dom DeLuise Show. Taped in Miami at The Jackie Gleason Theater, it featured many regular Gleason show cast members including The June Taylor Dancers and The Sammy Spear Orchestra. DeLuise's wife Carol Arthur also regularly appeared. The 16-week run was the summer replacement for The Jonathan Winters Show. He later starred in his own sitcom, Lotsa Luck (1973–1974).

DeLuise was probably best known as a regular in Mel Brooks's films. He appeared in The Twelve Chairs, Blazing Saddles, Silent Movie, History of the World, Part I, Spaceballs, and Robin Hood: Men in Tights. Brooks' wife, actress Anne Bancroft, directed Dom in Fatso (1980).

DeLuise exhibited his comedic talents while playing the speaking part of the jailer Frosch in the comedic operetta Die Fledermaus at the Metropolitan Opera, playing the role in four separate revivals of the work at the Met between December 1989 and January 1996. In the production, while the singing was in German, the spoken parts were in English. A lifelong opera fan, he also portrayed the role of L'Opinion Publique in drag for the Los Angeles Opera's production of Offenbach's Orpheus in the Underworld.

An avid cook and author of several books on cooking, he appeared as a regular contributor to a syndicated home improvement radio show, On The House with The Carey Brothers, giving listeners tips on culinary topics. He was also a friend and self-proclaimed "look-alike" of famous Cajun chef Paul Prudhomme and author of seven children's books.

== Personal life ==
In 1964, while working in a summer theater in Provincetown, Massachusetts, DeLuise met actress Carol Arthur. They married in 1965 and had three sons, all of whom became actors, writers, and directors themselves: Peter, Michael, and David DeLuise. In 1994, DeLuise was charged with criminal sexual contact with a male casino worker. The charges were later dropped.

== Death ==
DeLuise died in his sleep of kidney failure on May 4, 2009, at Saint John's Health Center in Santa Monica, California, at age 75. He had cancer for more than a year prior to his death and also had high blood pressure and diabetes.

Burt Reynolds paid tribute to DeLuise in the Los Angeles Times, saying: "As you get older and start to lose people you love, you think about it more, and I was dreading this moment. Dom always made you feel better when he was around, and there will never be another like him." Mel Brooks also made a statement to the same paper, telling them that DeLuise "created so much joy and laughter on the set that you couldn't get your work done. So every time I made a movie with Dom, I would plan another two days on the schedule just for laughter. It's a sad day. It's hard to think of this life and this world without him."

== Filmography ==
=== Film ===
| Year | Title | Role | Notes |
|---|---|---|---|
| 1964 | Diary of a Bachelor | Marvin Rollins | |
| 1964 | Fail Safe | Sgt. Collins | |
| 1966 | The Glass Bottom Boat | Julius Pritter | |
| 1967 | The Busy Body | Kurt Brock | |
| 1968 | What's So Bad About Feeling Good? | J. Gardner Monroe | |
| 1970 | Norwood | Bill Bird | |
| 1970 | The Twelve Chairs | Father Fyodor | |
| 1971 | Who Is Harry Kellerman and Why Is He Saying Those Terrible Things About Me? | Irwin Marcy | |
| 1972 | Every Little Crook and Nanny | Mario Azzecca | |
| 1974 | Blazing Saddles | Buddy Bizarre | |
| 1975 | The Adventure of Sherlock Holmes' Smarter Brother | Eduardo Gambetti | |
| 1976 | Silent Movie | Dom Bell | |
| 1977 | The World's Greatest Lover | Adolph Zitz | |
| 1978 | Sextette | Dan Turner | |
| 1978 | The End | Marlon Borunki | |
| 1978 | The Cheap Detective | Pepe Damascus | |
| 1979 | Hot Stuff | Ernie Fortunato | Also director |
| 1979 | The Muppet Movie | Bernie the Agent | |
| 1980 | Fatso | Dominic DeNapoli | |
| 1980 | The Last Married Couple in America | Walter Holmes | |
| 1980 | Wholly Moses! | Shadrach | |
| 1980 | Smokey and the Bandit II | Dr. Frederico "Doc" Carlucci | |
| 1981 | History of the World, Part I | Emperor Nero | |
| 1981 | The Cannonball Run | Victor Prinzim / Captain Chaos | |
| 1981 | Peter-No-Tail | Bull | English version |
| 1982 | The Best Little Whorehouse in Texas | Melvin P. Thorpe | |
| 1982 | The Secret of NIMH | Jeremy (voice) | |
| 1984 | Cannonball Run II | Victor Prinzi / Captain Chaos / Don Canneloni | |
| 1984 | Johnny Dangerously | The Pope | |
| 1986 | Haunted Honeymoon | Aunt Mary Kate | |
| 1986 | An American Tail | Tiger (voice) | |
| 1987 | Going Bananas | Big Bad Joe Hopkins | |
| 1987 | A Taxi Driver in New York | Captain T. Favretto | |
| 1987 | Spaceballs | Pizza the Hutt (voice) | |
| 1988 | Oliver & Company | Fagin (voice) | |
| 1989 | Happily Ever After | The Looking Glass (voice) | Original title: Snow White: The Adventure Continues |
| 1989 | All Dogs Go to Heaven | Itchy Itchiford (voice) | |
| 1990 | Loose Cannons | Harry Gutterman | |
| 1991 | Driving Me Crazy | Mr. B | Alternate title: Trabbi Goes to Hollywood |
| 1991 | Dragon and Slippers | Goliath the Dragon (voice) | English version |
| 1991 | An American Tail: Fievel Goes West | Tiger (voice) | |
| 1992 | Almost Pregnant | Doctor Beckhard | |
| 1992 | The Magic Voyage | Christopher Columbus (voice) | English version |
| 1992 | Munchie | Munchie (voice) | |
| 1993 | Robin Hood: Men in Tights | Don Giovanni | |
| 1993 | The Skateboard Kid | Rip (voice) | |
| 1994 | The Silence of the Hams | Dr. Animal Cannibal Pizza | |
| 1994 | A Troll in Central Park | Stanley (voice) | |
| 1995 | The 4th of July Parade | Pizza Guy | |
| 1996 | Red Line | Jerry | |
| 1996 | All Dogs Go to Heaven 2 | Itchy Itchiford (voice) | |
| 1997 | The Good Bad Guy | The Judge | |
| 1998 | Between the Sheets | | Cameo |
| 1998 | The Godson | The Oddfather | |
| 1998 | An American Tail: The Treasure of Manhattan Island | Tiger (voice) | Direct-to-video |
| 1998 | The Secret of NIMH 2: Timmy to the Rescue | Jeremy (voice) | Direct-to-video |
| 1999 | My X-Girlfriend's Wedding Reception | Father O'Rdeal | |
| 1999 | Baby Geniuses | Lenny | |
| 1999 | An American Tail: The Mystery of the Night Monster | Tiger (voice) | Direct-to-video |
| 2000 | The Brainiacs.com | Ivan Lucre | |
| 2000 | Monsters, Inc. | Narrator | Read-along Audiobook |
| 2000 | Lion of Oz | Oscar Diggs (voice) | Credited as Dom DeLuises |
| 2001 | Always Greener | | |
| 2002 | It's All About You | | |
| 2003 | Remembering Mario | Mario (voice) | |
| 2004 | Girl Play | Gabriel | |
| 2004 | Breaking the Fifth | Flealand Cunchulis | Last on-screen film role |
| 2006 | Video Classroom Lesson 1: Space and Sea | Animated School Teacher | Video short |
| 2019 | Bongee Bear and the Kingdom of Rhythm | Myrin (voice) | Recorded in 2006; posthumous release; final film role; dedicated in memory |

=== Television ===
| Year | Title | Role | Notes |
|---|---|---|---|
| 1962 | The Shari Lewis Show | Kenny Ketchem | 1 episode |
| 1963 | The Joey Bishop Show | Patient | Episode: "My Son, the Doctor" |
| 1964–1965 | The Entertainers | Himself | 5 episodes |
| 1966 | The Munsters | Dr. Dudley | Episode: "Just Another Pretty Face" |
| 1966 | The Dean Martin Summer Show | Himself | 6 episodes |
| 1968, 1987–1988 | The Dom DeLuise Show | Himself/host | 11 episodes |
| 1969 | The Ghost and Mrs. Muir | Seaman Elroy Applegate | Season 2 Episode 5 Seaman |
| 1971 | The Des O'Connor Show | Regular performer | |
| 1971–1972 | The Glen Campbell Goodtime Hour | Regular performer | |
| 1972 | The Roman Holidays | Mr. Francis Evictus (voice) | Episode: "Hectic Holiday" |
| 1972–1973 | The Dean Martin Show | Regular performer | |
| 1972 | Evil Roy Slade | Logan Delp | Television film |
| 1973–1974 | Lotsa Luck | Stanley Belmont | 22 episodes |
| 1974 | Only with Married Men | Murray West | Television film |
| 1977 | The Muppet Show | Himself | |
| 1977 | The Jacksons | Himself | 1 episode |
| 1983 | Happy | Roger Handover | Also executive producer |
| 1985 | Amazing Stories | Guilt | Episode: "Guilt Trip" |
| 1989 | 21 Jump Street | Uncle Nick | Episode: "Wooly Bullies" |
| 1989 | B.L. Stryker | Toby Beaumont | Episode: "Die Laughing" |
| 1990 | Timeless Tales from Hallmark | The Emperor (voice) | Episode: "The Emperor's New Clothes" |
| 1991 | Precious Moments Christmas: Timmy's Gift | Nicodemus (voice) | Direct-to-video |
| 1991–1992 | Candid Camera | Host | |
| 1991–1992 | Fievel's American Tails | Tiger (voice) | 13 Episodes |
| 1993 | Married... with Children | Floyd the Dog (voice) | Episode: "Change for a Buck" |
| 1993 | Diagnosis Murder | Buddy Blake | Episode: "Murder at the Telethon" |
| 1994 | Don't Drink the Water | Father Drobney | TV movie |
| 1994 | The Magic School Bus | Baker (voice) | Episode: "Gets Ready, Set, Dough" |
| 1994–1995 | Burke's Law | Vinnie Piatte | 25 episodes |
| 1994 | seaQuest DSV | Nick Piccolo | Episode: "Vapors" |
| 1995 | The Tin Soldier | Mr. Fallon | TV movie |
| 1995 | The Ren & Stimpy Show | Big Kahuna (voice) | Episode: "Aloha Höek" |
| 1995 | Alef Bet Blast-Off Lights of Freedom | Pharaoh | |
| 1996 | Shari's Passover Surprise | Himself | Television film |
| 1997 | Duckman | The Governor (voice) | Episode: "A Star Is Abhorred" |
| 1997 | Cow and Chicken | Jean-Paul Beaver / Governor #2 / Owl #2 / Mayor / Frenchman #3 / Neighbor #2 (voices) | 2 Episodes |
| 1997 | Beverly Hills 90210 | Magic Morton | Episode: "I Only Have Eyes for You" |
| 1997 | 3rd Rock from the Sun | Mr. Timmy Polone | Episode: "Auto Erodicka" |
| 1998 | An All Dogs Christmas Carol | Itchy/Ghost of Christmas Past (voice) | TV movie |
| 1998 | Sabrina, the Teenage Witch | Mortimer | Episode: "The Pom Pom Incident" |
| 1998 | The Charlie Horse Music Pizza | Cookie | Season 1 - Season 2 |
| 1998 | Police Academy: The Series | Zeus (voice) | Episode: "Bring Me the Turtle of Commandant Hefilfinger" |
| 1998 | Hercules: The Animated Series | Bacchus (voice) | Episode: "Hercules and the Bacchanal" |
| 1996–1998 | All Dogs Go to Heaven: The Series | Itchy Itchiford (voice) | 20 Episodes |
| 1998 | The Wild Thornberrys | Baby Condor (voice) | Episode: "Flight of the Donnie" |
| 1997–1999 | I Am Weasel | Mayor / Frenchman #3 / Neighbor #2 (voices) | 2 episodes |
| 1997–2003 | Dexter's Laboratory | Koosy / Koosalagoopagoop (voice) | 4 episodes |
| 1998–1999 | The Charlie Horse Music Pizza | Cookie (voice) | 23 episodes |
| 1999 | Stargate SG-1 | Urgo | Episode: "Urgo" |
| 1999 | Stargate SG-1 | Togar | Episode: "Urgo" |
| 1999 | Boys Will Be Boys | Chef | TV movie; also director |
| 2001 | Emeril | Himself | Episode: "One Man's Cornbread" |
| 2002 | Rugrats | Director (voice) | Episode: "Starstruck/Who's Taffy?" |
| 2004 | Father of the Pride | Duke (voice) | Episode: "One Man's Meat Is Another Man's Girlfriend" |
| 2005 | Robot Chicken | Victor Prinzim / Himself (voices) | Episode: "Gold Dust Gasoline" |
| 2005 | Duck Dodgers | Roy Serpenti (voice) | Episode: "All in the Crime Family" |
| 2009 | Spaceballs: The Animated Series | Pizza the Hutt (voice) | Episode: "Pilot Part 1: The Avenge of Dark Helmet" (Final acting role) |

=== Video games ===
| Year | Title | Role | Notes |
|---|---|---|---|
| 1996 | Toonstruck | 'Fingers' the Cashier | |

=== Theme parks ===
| Year | Title | Role | Notes |
|---|---|---|---|
| 1990 | An American Tail Theatre | Tiger | |
| 1999 | Dudley Do-Right's Ripsaw Falls | Bear | |

== Works ==
=== Writings for children ===
- Charlie the Caterpillar, illustrated by Christopher Santoro, Simon & Schuster, 1990
- Goldilocks (also known as Goldie Locks & The Three Bears: The Real Story!), illustrated by Santoro, Simon & Schuster, 1992
- Hansel & Gretel, by Santoro, Simon & Schuster,1997
- The Nightingale (also known as Dom DeLuise's The Nightingale), illustrated by Santoro, Simon & Schuster, 1998
- King Bob's New Clothes, illustrated by Santoro, Simon & Schuster, 1999
- The Pouch Potato, illustrated by Derek Carter, Bacchus Books, 2001
- There's No Place Like Home, illustrated by Tim Brown

=== Cookbooks ===
- Eat This ... It Will Make You Feel Better: Mamma's Italian Home Cooking and Other Favorites of Family and Friends (also known as Eat This), Simon & Schuster, 1988
- Eat This Too! It'll Also Make You Feel Better (also known as Eat This Too!), Atria, 1997
- The Pizza Challenge
