= Trabbi Goes to Hollywood =

1991 film by Jon Turteltaub

- DVD cover
- Directed by: Jon Turteltaub
- Written by: Jon Turteltaub; David Tausik; R. M. London
- Produced by: Brad Krevoy; Steven Stabler
- Starring: Thomas Gottschalk; Michelle Johnson; Billy Dee Williams; Dom DeLuise; James Tolkan
- Cinematography: Phedon Papamichael
- Edited by: Armen Minasian; Nancy Richardson
- Music by: Joey Balin; Christopher Franke
- Distributed by: Motion Picture Corporation of America
- Release date: March 16, 1991 (Germany)
- Running time: 87 minutes
- Countries: United States; Germany
- Languages: English; German

Trabbi Goes to Hollywood (English title: Driving Me Crazy) is a 1991 American comedy film directed by Jon Turteltaub and starring Thomas Gottschalk, Billy Dee Williams, Michelle Johnson, Dom DeLuise, and James Tolkan.

== Plot ==
Gunther Schmidt (Thomas Gottschalk) is a young, eccentric East German inventor who (like many others) attempts to flee across the border to the West using his inventions, but constantly meets with failure. Finally, he constructs a gadget which actually works: a modified Trabant ("Trabbi") with a motor running on turnip juice, making it ultimately environmental but still capable of attaining a speed of up to 250 km/h. But by the time his invention is perfected, East and West Germany are reunited, rendering the Trabbi's role as an escape vehicle obsolete.

As Western capitalism moves into Gunther's hometown Engelswald, American tycoon John McReady (George Kennedy), who intends to buy the town to erect a factory there, invites him to go to an Automobile Festival in Los Angeles. With no German car manufacturers interested in his invention, Gunther decides to try his luck in the United States, a totally new world for him, where he befriends his hotel's parking valet, Max (Billy Dee Williams). As he rehearses for the presentation of his invention, he is overheard by Vince (James Tolkan), an associate of Mr. B (Dom DeLuise), an influential but deceitful car designer. After checking out the validity of Gunther's claims, Vince nabs the Trabbi and escapes.

With no clue where his car was taken to, Gunther pays a visit to Ricki Stein (Michelle Johnson), the niece of one of his fellow townspeople who lives in LA. Later on, when Max uses his street contacts to discover the Trabbi's whereabouts, he and Gunther learn where to find Vince. Vince tells them that he has delivered the car to the house of Mr. B, who, eager to present a new car design in order to make money, intends to pass off Gunther's Trabbi as his own invention at an auction the very next day. With no legal way to get his car back, and after a falling-out with Max, Gunther seeks out McReady's firm for help, only to find out that McReady intends to expand his business all over the world, including Engelswald, with extreme aggressiveness. With the deadline for McReady's acquisition of Engelswald coming up, and the purchase price set at $15 million, Gunther is all the more under pressure to get his car back and prevent the conversion of his hometown into a singular factory complex.

With Ricki's help, Gunther infiltrates Mr. B's auction, but they are both identified and captured. Max, who has had a change of heart, frees them and, posing as the auctioneer, gains the attention of car manufacturing president Mr. Goodwyn (Steve Kanaly). Mr. B frees himself and his henchmen, and they open fire on Gunther and Max, forcing them to flee in the Trabbi, with Mr. B, Ricki, and Goodwyn in pursuit. The chase ends in the hills of Los Angeles, where Mr. B promptly presents the Trabbi to Goodwyn, skillfully countering Gunther's claims to the contrary. In the end, Gunther runs the Trabbi off a nearby slope, destroying it, and is now rightfully able to claim that only he can build a new one. With Mr. B exposed as a fraud, Goodwyn gives Gunther the Trabbi's auction price of $15 million, leaving Gunther free to save his hometown and start a romance with Ricki.

== Cast ==
- Thomas Gottschalk as Gunther Schmidt
- Michelle Johnson as Ricki Stein / Frederike Hochstein
- Billy Dee Williams as Max
- Dom DeLuise as "Mr. B"
- James Tolkan as Vince
- George Kennedy as John McCready
- Milton Berle as Hotel Clerk
- Steve Kanaly as Mr. Goodwyn
- Richard Moll as Buzz
- Morton Downey, Jr. as Taj
- Tommy 'Tiny' Lister as "Cubey" (credited as Tiny Lister Jr.)
- Andre Rosey Brown as Bluto
- Peter Lupus as GM Boss
- Vlade Divac as Yugo Boss
- Antony Alda as Jack
- Robert Miano as Omar
- Celeste Yarnall as Volvo Boss

== Reception ==
Trabbi Goes to Hollywood received a generally poor reception. The German film magazine Cinema evaluates the film as a "ramschiger Rübenrotz" ("junky turnip snot") and summarized the film plot's value with the words "Thommy Go Home!". In 2020 the movie was shown on German TV on the show Die schlechtesten Filme aller Zeiten, on the occasion of the 70th birthday of Thomas Gottschalk.
