= Hot Stuff (1979 film) =

1979 comedy film by Dom DeLuise

- Theatrical release poster
- Directed by: Dom DeLuise
- Written by: Michael Kane; Donald E. Westlake
- Produced by: Mort Engelberg
- Starring: Dom DeLuise; Suzanne Pleshette; Jerry Reed
- Cinematography: James Pergola
- Edited by: Neil Travis
- Music by: Patrick Williams
- Production company: Rastar
- Distributed by: Columbia Pictures
- Release date: August 10, 1979
- Running time: 91 minutes
- Country: United States
- Language: English

Hot Stuff is a 1979 American action crime comedy film starring Dom DeLuise, Suzanne Pleshette, Jerry Reed and Ossie Davis. DeLuise also directed the film (the only film where he did so), and the song "Hot Stuff" was written and performed by Reed.

== Plot ==
In Miami, police detectives Ernie, Ramon, and Doug grow frustrated at their inability to convict the criminals they arrest. Ernie is the most frustrated, and plans to retire within days so he can receive his pension. Their supervisor Captain John Geiberger recruits another police detective, Louise Webster, to help them. One night, Doug observes a fence named Hymie buying stolen merchandise inside his pawn shop, and arrests him. The next morning, Doug proposes to Geiberger and his co-workers to set up a sting operation to trap criminals making illegal transactions, and record them on a portable VHS videotape camera. Geiberger gets the police chief's approval to the operation, but will deny any knowledge if word is leaked to the department or the press.

Inside Hymie's pawn shop, they test the videotape camera for sound quality and positioning. For a period of time, the sting appears successful. One night, three criminals rob the pawn shop of their earnings. They purchase a guard dog they name Jaws to protect the shop. Sometime later, Kiley, a police lieutenant, arrives after receiving a tip that the pawn shop is conducting a fencing operation. Ernie and Doug deny this and pay him a thousand dollars a week to keep quiet. Kiley leaves, then, a young boy arrives wanting to sell a dog for one hundred dollars to feed both him and his baby sister. They do not purchase the dog, but generously hand him one hundred dollars.

Carmine, a mob boss, arrives and threatens Ernie and Doug for trenching into their business area. As their sting operation continues, they deal with quirky customers, including a hitman who sells a revolver, an elderly Jewish woman attempting to buy a toaster, and a British couple selling marijuana. Meanwhile, Ernie and Doug notice Carmine's men parked near the pawn store. They are also approached by two gunrunners who try to sell them a truckload of M76 submachine guns. While Louise and Ramon videotape from afar, Ernie and Doug are taken to a waterfront condominium construction site where the guns are stored. They reveal they are actually detectives and a shootout ensues. The gunrunners are arrested.

Carmine threatens them again by sending them a dead fish wrapped in newspapers. However, they decide to continue the operation but decide to re-sell some of their stolen items to stay in business. Geiberger reprimands them for their misuse of police funds, but is amazed that they have videotaped 171 suspects up till now. Back at the pawn shop, Louise notices that one of the Cuban cigar boxes they recently bought earlier contains a bomb deliberately planted by Carmine. The bomb is thrown out, but destroys Doug's car.

Before closing the operation, they invite the suspects to a party where they hope to arrest them en masse. However, Carmine arrives unannounced with his men, and assaults Ernie and Doug. The suspects stand up for them, and help to fight the mobsters. More police officers arrive after Geiberger calls them in and the mobsters and suspects are apprehended, with 250 arrested (of which 231 are convicted). Ernie decides not to retire and is appointed as lieutenant and the new assistant director of the burglary task force. Doug, having fallen in love with Louise, begins a new relationship with her before they eventually get hitched.

== Main cast ==
- Dom DeLuise as Ernie Fortunato
- Suzanne Pleshette as Louise Webster
- Jerry Reed as Doug von Horne
- Ossie Davis as Captain John Geiberger
- Luis Ávalos as Ramon
- Pat McCormick as Area Mob hitman (man with cigars)
- Marc Lawrence as Carmine
- Sydney Lassick as Hymie
- Mayor Leonard Haber as Carmine's Hood #3

== Production ==
Mostly filmed in 1978, in South Beach, Miami Beach, in the South of Fifth neighborhood and on Española Way.

Ernie Fortunato's (Dom DeLuise) family is played by Dom DeLuise's actual wife and children.

The script was co-written by best-selling crime novelist Donald E. Westlake.

== Critical reception ==
"...has the form of an extended television sketch that can never be any better or more than its individual parts. More important than anything else, though — and don't underrate the surprising effect of this — "Hot Stuff" is a movie about essentially nice people."

Movie critic Roger Ebert gave the film two and a half out of four stars and said:

"It is easy to imagine this material not working even though the movie is also livened up by explosions, shootouts and a wild party. Most of the movie's character-building and most of the laughs happen on one set, and repeat the one situation. But the characters are so well-drawn (not deeply drawn, just well drawn) that we get to like them. DeLuise, directing himself, doesn't indulge himself, and gives a lot of the best lines to his three costars."

"DeLuise was a brilliant comic but only within restrained bits. Stretched out to feature-length, he wears on your nerves." — armchaircinema.com
