= Lauren Chen =

Canadian conservative political commentator (born 1994)

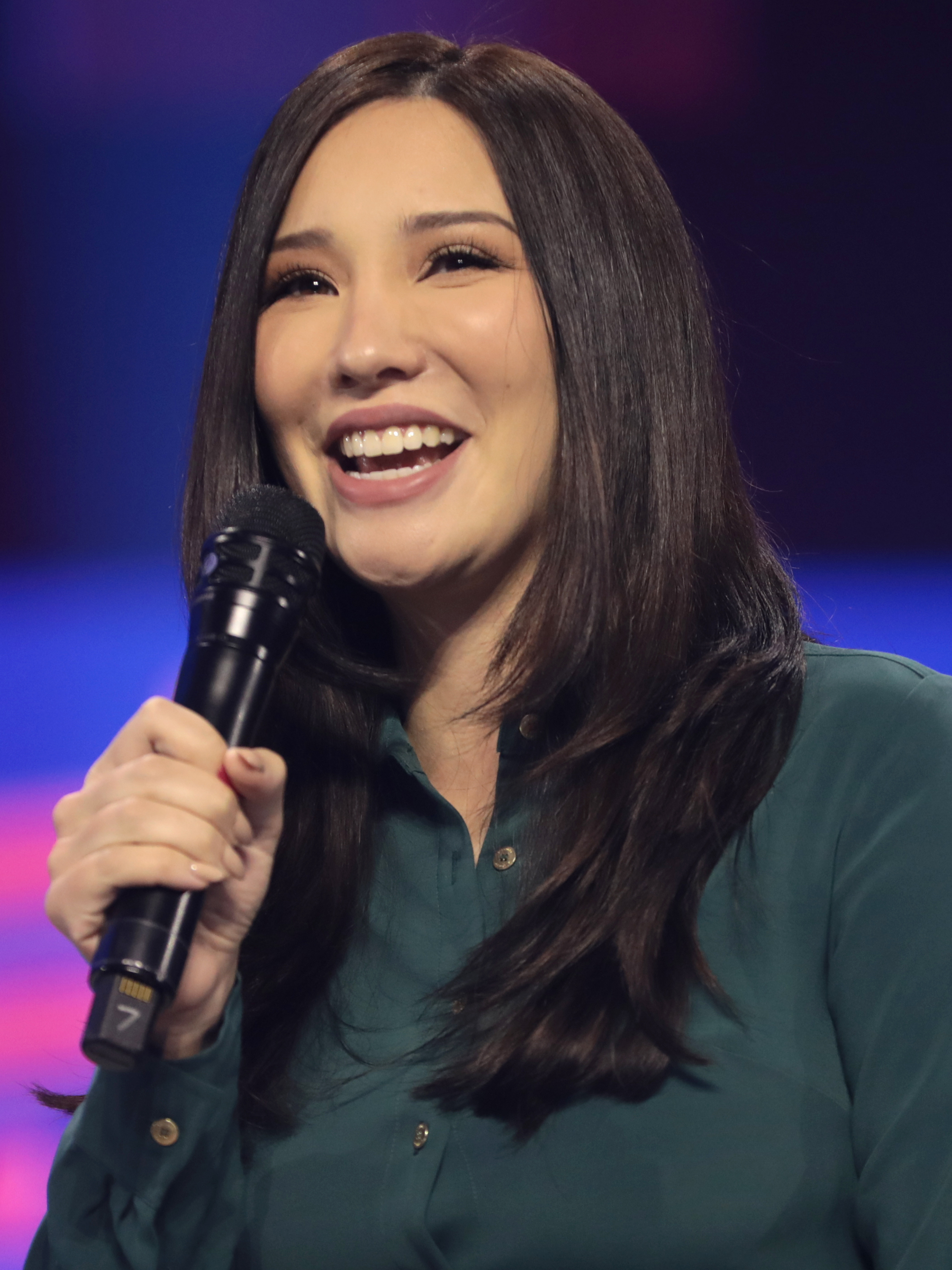
- Chen in 2022
- Born: Lauren Yu Sum Tam; 30 June 1994 (age 32); Quebec, Canada
- Other name: Roaming Millennial
- Education: Brigham Young University (BA)
- Spouse: Liam Donovan
- Children: 2

YouTube information
- Channel: Lauren Chen
- Years active: 2016–2024 (now suspended)
- Subscribers: 572 thousand
- Views: 100.7 million
- Last updated: September 2024

Lauren Chen (born 1994, as Lauren Yu Sum Tam) is a Hong-Kong–Canadian conservative political commentator and former YouTube personality. She has worked with BlazeTV, Turning Point USA, and has contributed opinion pieces to RT. Her husband, Liam Donovan, was president of the now-defunct Tenet Media, a company they co-founded.

== Early life and education ==
Lauren Yu Sum Tam was born in Quebec, Canada, and spent much of her childhood in Hong Kong. She has lived in Shanghai, Singapore, and London. Her father is ethnically Chinese and her parents met in Canada. Chen attended the University of Southern California and Brigham Young University, where she studied political science and screenwriting. In December 2014, Chen graduated from Brigham Young University with a Bachelor of Arts degree in political science with summa cum laude honors.

== Career ==
Chen began her online career in 2016, using the moniker "Roaming Millennial" on YouTube. Her videos focused on various political and social issues from a conservative viewpoint, including critiques of immigration, LGBT rights and feminism. These views helped her gain a significant following among conservative audiences.

Throughout her rise in the conservative media sphere, Chen's platform facilitated connections with both mainstream conservative figures and more controversial individuals. In 2017, she interviewed Richard Spencer, a white supremacist and prominent figure in the alt-right movement, though she publicly distanced herself from his white nationalist views. By positioning herself as a more moderate voice while engaging with controversial figures, she became a bridge between mainstream conservatism and the far-right online ecosystem.

On 5 December 2017, Chen founded Roaming Millenial Inc.: a company that was incorporated in Pointe-Claire, Quebec, Canada. The company currently operates in Hudson, Quebec, and is co-owned by Chen's husband: Liam Donovan.

In late 2018, Chen started writing for Evie Magazine, an antifeminist women's magazine. She wrote pieces deriding hookup culture and careerism in women. In a 2020 column, she argued that calling COVID-19 "the Chinese virus" was not racist and criticized Chinese state media's "propaganda" about COVID-19.

By 2019, Chen had accumulated over 400,000 subscribers on her (now-suspended) YouTube channel and continued to expand her presence. She became a contributor to CRTV, which later merged with Glenn Beck's TheBlaze, where she hosted her own show, Pseudo-Intellectual. She contributed to Turning Point USA, an American conservative nonprofit organization.

In 2021, she began contributing op-eds to RT, a Russian state media outlet, publishing articles with headlines such as "America’s 'white supremacy' is a myth" and "If you’re American and oppose war with Russia, expect to be smeared as unpatriotic." According to a federal indictment, Chen, identified as "Founder-1," was allegedly compensated by RT to create and publish over two hundred videos on her personal YouTube channel without disclosing the source of funding.

Chen has expressed support for white supremacist streamer Nick Fuentes's anti-Israel stance on the Gaza war; and criticized U.S. support for Ukraine in the Russo-Ukrainian War. She has suggested that former U.N. Ambassador Nikki Haley should "move to Ukraine and run for its presidency".

== Tenet Media and alleged Russian connections ==
On 19 January 2022, Chen co-founded Tenet Media with her husband, Liam Donovan. In January 2023, Chen allegedly received a contract from RT to recruit other commentators for Tenet Media as part of the former's efforts to influence U.S. public opinion. Chen recruited conservative or conservative-adjacent commentators Matt Christiansen, Tayler Hansen, Benny Johnson, Tim Pool, Dave Rubin, and Lauren Southern to be a part of the Tenet Media network. Despite her role at Tenet, her name did not appear on the company's website, nor did she publicly associate her title with the organization on social media.

=== United States federal indictment ===
A federal indictment unsealed in September 2024 accused Tenet Media of receiving funding and direction from a covert operation funded by Russia to disseminate pro-Russian propaganda within the United States. The indictment, filed in the Southern District of New York, alleged that Russian state-controlled media company RT funneled nearly US$10 million to Tenet Media to create and distribute content favorable to Russian interests, aimed at amplifying U.S. domestic divisions. The indictment specifically named Kostiantyn Kalashnikov and Elena Afanasyeva, employees of RT, as the main operatives behind the funding.

The Justice Department said that Tenet Media, referred to as "US Company 1" in the indictment, produced numerous videos that supported Russia's geopolitical aims and received significant views on platforms such as YouTube, Twitter, and TikTok. These activities were part of broader Russian efforts to influence U.S. public opinion ahead of the 2024 elections. Although the indictment suggested that not all individuals affiliated with Tenet were aware of the source of funding, it highlighted that founders, including Chen, were cognizant of their financial backers and actively concealed this information.

The indictment stated, "The unsealed indictment said the founders of the unidentified company — widely reported to be Tenet Media — knew their funding came from 'the Russians.'" It alleges the Tenet founders masked their Russian funding by creating a fictitious persona of a wealthy European sponsor, "Eduard Grigoriann." The charged Russian nationals, Kostiantyn Kalashnikov and Elena Afanasyeva, were involved in day-to-day operations of Tenet by fall 2023, using false names to conceal they were Russian RT employees. The indictment alleges the founders acknowledged in private communications that their "investors" were actually the "Russians."

Attorney general Merrick Garland said Tenet "never disclosed to the influencers or to their millions of followers its ties to RT and the Russian government." Prosecutors also allege the US$10 million was a Russian money laundering operation.

=== Canadian government reaction ===
On 10 September, five Canadian members of parliament (MP) issued a letter calling for Chen to testify before a Canadian parliamentary committee.

After being summoned, Chen appeared with counsel during the hearing on 5 November 2024, and refused to answer any questions, citing the U.S. criminal investigation. This prompted the committee, comprising MPs from all parties, to unanimously vote to send the matter to the House of Commons as a potential contempt of parliament case.

=== Response and public statements ===
Following the indictment's public release, Tenet Media and the involved commentators, including Chen, did not immediately respond to requests for comment.

In response to the indictment, BlazeTV officially fired her. Her Turning Point USA profile was also removed. Her channels, as well as that of Tenet Media, were taken down by YouTube. Tenet Media has since been shuttered.

In September 2025, Chen denied the allegations in a post on Twitter.

== Recent developments ==
After her federal indictment in 2024, Chen fled the U.S. with her husband. In 2025 she was welcomed back to the U.S. by State Department employee Joe Rittenhouse (who serves as special adviser to the Bureau of Consular Affairs) and invited to the White House Easter Egg Roll in April 2026. On November 12, 2026, she attended the Citizen Journalist Gala hosted by James O'Keefe at Donald Trump's Mar-a-Lago resort.

== See also ==
- Russian interference in the 2024 United States elections
