= Alternative Influence: Broadcasting the Reactionary Right on YouTube =

Research paper

Alternative Influence: Broadcasting the Reactionary Right on YouTube is a 2018 report by researcher Rebecca Lewis published at the think tank Data & Society that performs network analysis on a collection of 65 political influencers on 81 YouTube channels. Lewis argues that this network propagates right-wing ideology.

== Content ==
Lewis posits that, though this group of thinkers is in some ways ideologically quite diverse, they appear best defined by their reactionary nature. Lewis finds that members of the AIN develop audiences by cultivating ideas of authenticity and "countercultural" appeal. Further, she identifies a variety of mechanisms that draw viewers from less-radical to more-radical rightwing reactionary content. Hosts can invite members from further fringes of the right for softball interviews. Debates can play a role in validating ideas further towards extremes by lending ideas such as ethnonationalism the sense that they are worth considering.

In a short section of the report, Lewis suggests that the most extreme content on YouTube should be demonetized.

=== Methodology ===
Lewis identified guest appearances that occurred on each show. Lewis found that many more moderate libertarian or conservative YouTubers often host much more extreme members of the AIN on their shows, providing uncritical interviews. This style of collaboration is a common method of building YouTube followings, often used in other genres like beauty blogging. Move this section to 'conclusions' ->This makes addressing it much more difficult for YouTube, says Lewis, in contrast to lists of banned words. To address this issue of radicalization, Lewis suggests that YouTube should not only assess the content of hosts in YouTube videos, but also their guests.

== Reception ==
Some individuals named in the report, such as Dave Rubin and Ben Shapiro, opposed their inclusion. They argued that the implied 'rightwing reactionary' label does not apply to them or that their connections to the white supremacists and other extremists on the chart constitute slander by association.

Vox writer Ezra Klein sees Lewis's work as a work related to Bari Weiss's discussion of the intellectual dark web. While Weiss discusses the most respected subset of this fuzzy group of thinkers, Lewis draws a broader map.

== Related works ==
A 2020 study by Harvard Misinformation Review analyzed and compared links from Reddit and 4chan's /pol/ board. It noted that a large number of outlinks are to YouTube channels identified in the Alternative Influence Network, while surprisingly few links go to low-quality "pink slime" news sources. They found that the AIN was more popular on Reddit than on 4chan, with the most popular overall member of the network being Joe Rogan's PowerfulJRE channel. On Reddit, debate- and interview-style shows like Paul Joseph Watson, Jordan Peterson, and Dave Rubin are most popular, while on 4chan direct-audience styles are more common. These include Sargon of Akkad's "The Thinkery" and Baked Alaska's channel. Further, users of the two sites use their links differently. On Reddit, users use links as objects for discussion and analyze, whereas on 4chan users use links to AIN channels as components of arguments.

The paper Mapping YouTube in the journal First Monday used the Alternative Influence Network's channels as a starting point for additional analysis to analyze YouTube's categorization scheme in 2020. The First Monday paper "Alt-right pipeline: individual journeys to extremism online" describes the online radicalization process, in part relying on the AIN and the data Lewis accumulated. The paper notes that the specific radicalization processes discussed mirror Lewis's depiction of the process. The First Monday paper "Influencers and targets on social media" explores the role of social networking and group dynamics on the development of influencer-audience relationships. It relies on Lewis's work to discuss how people develop group preferences, often through cultivation of a countercultural identity by the influencer.
