= Tim Pool =

American political commentator (born 1986)

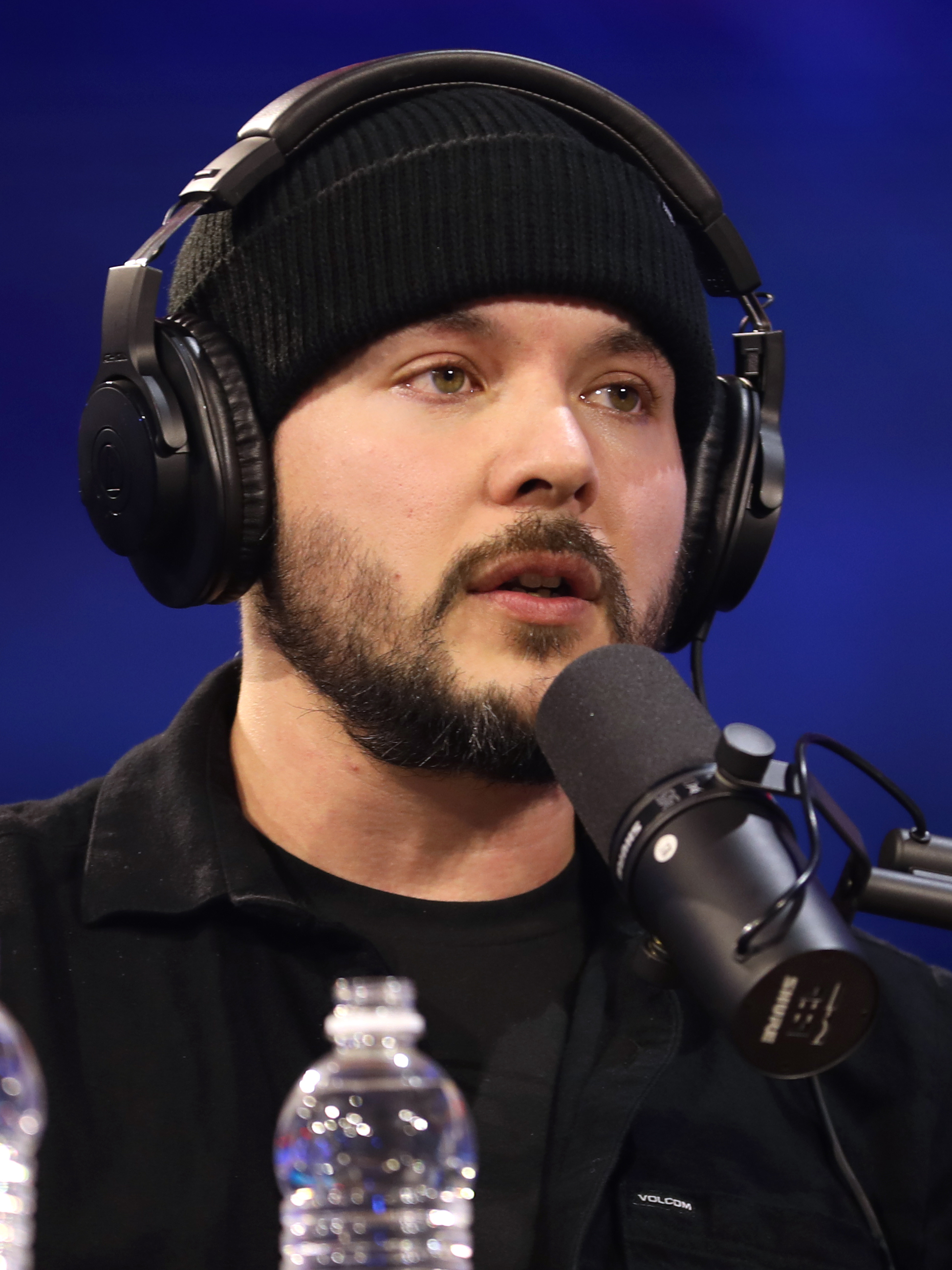
- Pool in 2023
- Born: Timothy Daniel Pool; March 9, 1986 (age 40); Chicago, Illinois, U.S.
- Occupations: YouTuber; podcaster; political commentator
- Years active: 2011–present
- Spouse: Alison Neubauer (m. 2025)
- Children: 1

YouTube information
- Channels: Tim Pool; Timcast; Timcast IRL
- Genre: Political commentary
- Subscribers: 1.37 million (Tim Pool); 1.29 million (Timcast); 1.9 million (Timcast IRL)
- Views: 504 million (Tim Pool); 1.4 billion (Timcast); 1.2 billion (Timcast IRL)
- Tim Pool's voice On fake news and social media censorship Recorded November 2020
- Last updated: September 22, 2024
- Website: timcast.com

Timothy Daniel Pool (born March 9, 1986) is an American right-wing political commentator and podcast host. He live streamed the 2011 Occupy Wall Street protests and his footage was aired on NBC and other mainstream networks. He joined Vice Media and Fusion TV in 2014, later working on YouTube and other platforms.

== Early life ==
Pool was born in Chicago, Illinois, and grew up in a middle class family. His father was a firefighter and his mother sold cars. Pool is of mixed Korean and Irish descent.

Pool attended a Catholic school until completing the fifth grade and left school at the age of 14.

== Career ==
=== Occupy Wall Street ===
After watching a viral video from Occupy Wall Street, Pool purchased a one-way bus ticket to New York. Pool joined the Occupy Wall Street protestors on September 20, 2011. Shortly thereafter, he met Henry Ferry, a former realtor and sales manager, with whom he founded media company The Other 99. Pool also began livestreaming the protests with his cell phone and quickly assumed an on-camera role. Pool used a live-chat stream to respond to questions from viewers while reporting on Occupy Wall Street. Pool also let his viewers direct him on where to shoot footage. He modified a toy remote-controlled Parrot AR.Drone for aerial surveillance and modified software for live streaming into a system called DroneStream. In mid-November 2011, Pool broadcast live streams, one of which reached 21 hours in length, of Occupy Wall Street's eviction from Zuccotti Park. Pool's use of live streaming video and aerial drones during Occupy Wall Street protests in 2011 led to an article in The Guardian querying whether such activities could take the form of counterproductive surveillance.

In January 2012, he was physically accosted by a masked assailant. Also in January 2012, The Other 99 was disbanded following a feud between Pool and Ferry. Pool had also planned on livestreaming occupy protests across the United States for a documentary called Occumentary, but it was never filmed.

Pool's video taken during the protests was instrumental evidence in the acquittal of photographer Alexander Arbuckle, who had been arrested by the NYPD and charged with disorderly conduct. The video showed that the arresting officer lied under oath. While covering the NoNATO protests at the 2012 Chicago summit, Pool and four others were pulled over by a dozen Chicago police officers in unmarked vehicles. The group was removed from the vehicle at gunpoint, questioned, and detained for ten minutes. The reason given by police was that the team's vehicle matched a description of another vehicle they sought.

In the context of the Occupy movement, Pool's footage was aired on NBC and other mainstream networks. According to The Washington Post, Pool "helped demonstrate to activists that livestreaming had potential as an alternative to depending on cable news coverage." He was nominated as a Time 100 personality in March 2012 for his importance to the Occupy movement, alongside David Graeber, as Time dubbed Pool "the eyes of the movement".

In November 2011, Pool told On the Media, "I don't consider myself a journalist. I consider myself an activist 100%" there "to support the movement." In October 2012, he told El País that "I'm not an activist" and described himself as a journalist. In 2018, Pool said that "I don't align with Occupy Wall Street and never did." In 2021, he denounced the Occupy movement as "crooked".

=== Vice and Fusion ===
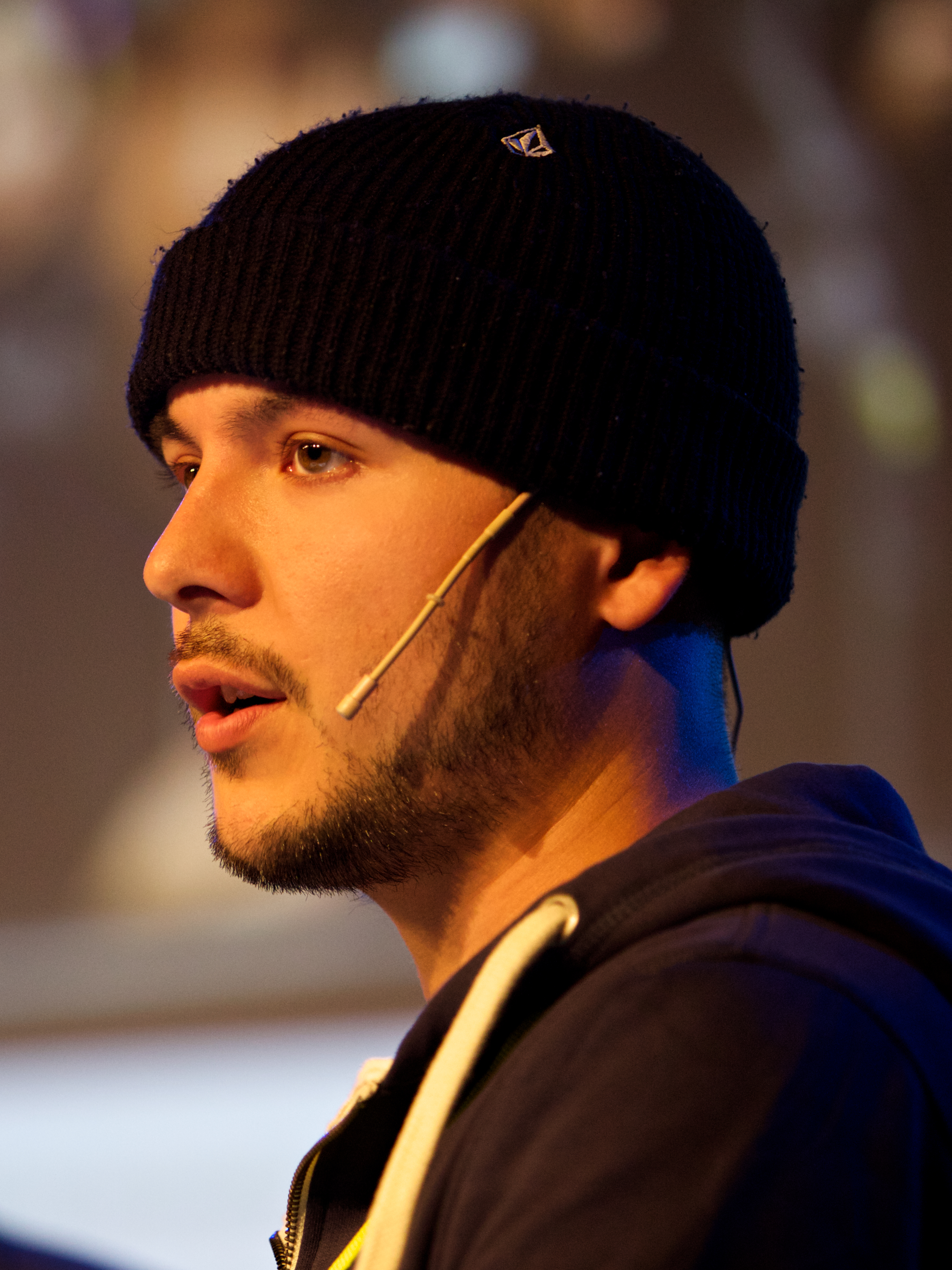
Pool in 2015

After joining Vice Media, Pool began producing and hosting content and developed new methods of reporting. In 2013, he reported on the Gezi Park protests in Istanbul with Google Glass. In April 2013, Pool received a Shorty Award in the "Best Journalist in Social Media" category. From 2013 to 2014, while working for Vice, Pool covered and live streamed the mass protests in Ukraine that led to the collapse of the Yanukovych government. He also covered the Ferguson unrest and covered protests in Thailand, Turkey, and Egypt.

In 2014, he joined Fusion TV as Director of Media innovation and Senior Correspondent.

=== Independent work ===
As of 2021, Pool operates six YouTube channels, two of which, Timcast and Tim Pool, feature daily political commentary, while a third serves as a clip channel for Pool's podcast, Timcast IRL.

In May 2022, it was estimated that Timcast IRL generated $65,824.86 in non-advertising revenue for YouTube across 100 videos on the Timcast IRL channel from October 2020 to November 2021.

==== Journalism and commentary ====
Pool covered the 2016 Milwaukee riots. Pool said he would leave the area and stop reporting on these events, saying he thought it was dangerous due to perceived escalating "racial tensions".

In February 2017, Pool traveled to Sweden to investigate claims of "no-go zones" and problems with refugees in the country. He launched a crowdfunding effort to do so after U.S. president Donald Trump alluded to crimes related to immigration in Sweden. InfoWars writer Paul Joseph Watson offered to pay for travel costs and accommodation for any reporter "to stay in crime-ridden migrant suburbs of Malmö." Watson donated $2,000 to Pool's crowdfund to travel to Sweden. While in Sweden, Pool largely disputed that migrant suburbs of Malmö and Stockholm were crime ridden, saying that Chicago is vastly more violent. While filming in Rinkeby, an "especially vulnerable area" in Stockholm, Pool alleged that he had to be escorted by police, due to purported threats to his safety. Swedish police have disputed Pool's claims, stating, "Our understanding is that he didn't receive an escort. However, he followed the police who left the place." The police stated that, "When Tim Pool took out a camera and started filming, a group of young people pulled their hoods up and covered their faces and shouted at him to stop filming. The officers then told Tim Pool that it was not wise to stay there in the middle of the square and keep filming."

In November 2017, Pool created his second YouTube channel, Timcast News.

In 2019, podcaster Joe Rogan invited Pool onto his podcast, The Joe Rogan Experience, following an interview with Twitter founder Jack Dorsey. The two criticized the banning of alt-right commentator Milo Yiannopoulos from Twitter, arguing that the provocateur had not truly encouraged his fans to harass Ghostbusters actress Leslie Jones. The Atlantic contributor Devin Gordon criticized Rogan and Pool, stating that both men demonstrated a limited understanding of Twitter, censorship, and abuse during the discussion. Rogan invited Pool and Dorsey, as well as Twitter chief legal officer Vijaya Gadde, back on his podcast. Pool described cases where he asserted conservatives were unfairly suspended on Twitter. In particular, Pool brought up the banning of Alex Jones and argued that Twitter rules against misgendering transgender users is ideological. Gadde said that Twitter is a free speech platform on which punishments are based on evaluation of consistently applied harassment guidelines.

In July 2019, Pool was invited to participate in a White House event hosting right-wing internet personalities who Trump characterized as unfairly targeted for their views. Some news outlets described Pool as a spreader of a conspiracy theory about the murder of Seth Rich.

In August 2020, Trump liked a tweet published by Pool expressing sympathy and support for Kyle Rittenhouse, a 17-year-old from Illinois then facing trial on homicide charges of killing two people during the riots in Kenosha, Wisconsin, for which he was ultimately acquitted. Trump's son, Donald Trump Jr., retweeted a statement by Pool describing how the case of Rittenhouse had convinced Pool to vote for Trump.

A report from the Election Integrity Partnership (EIP) said that Pool was a "superspreader" of fake news surrounding voter fraud before and after the 2020 United States presidential election.

In June 2021, Pool invited North Korean defector Yeonmi Park onto his podcast. Park claimed that North Koreans "don't know the concept of love" aside from political admiration of Kim Jong Un. Pool replied by telling her that this was "The most villainous thing I've ever heard." however, an investigation by experts and journalist into Park's claims about North Korea found that she had fabricated many of her stories, including the ones she told Pool.

Pool was a critic of vaccine mandates in the COVID-19 pandemic, said he was unvaccinated, and hosted COVID-19 conspiracy theorists. In August 2021, he criticized New York City Mayor Bill de Blasio's COVID-19 vaccine passport mandate, as it did not have any exemptions for immunocompromised people or people with other disabilities. When Pool contracted COVID-19 in November of that year, he told his audience that he was prescribed and had taken ivermectin, known to be ineffective against the virus, along with monoclonal antibodies, an effective treatment.

In April 2022, Pool and The Daily Wire CEO Jeremy Boreing purchased a billboard in Times Square to accuse Taylor Lorenz of doxxing the Twitter account Libs of TikTok. In response, Lorenz called the billboard "so idiotic it's hilarious."

In November 2022, Pool interviewed rapper and presidential candidate Kanye West on his podcast, Timcast IRL. West's political advisors, Milo Yiannopoulos and white supremacist Nick Fuentes also participated in the interview. The interview came days after West and Fuentes met with former President Trump. During the interview, West made a series of antisemitic statements, including claims about a Jewish conspiracy controlling the American government and media. Pool criticized West's comments on Jews, saying "I'm gonna disagree with you." After Pool refused to criticize Jews, West and his advisors walked out of the interview.

According to The Independent, BuzzFeed News, and The Daily Dot, Pool has a "primarily right-wing audience".

After the 2025 Brown University shooting, Pool shared misinformation falsely identifying a Palestinian Brown University undergraduate student as the perpetrator. A different individual, Cláudio Neves Valente, was subsequently identified as the shooter.

==== 2024 Tenet Media investigation ====
In September 2024, U.S. federal prosecutors charged two employees of Russia's state-controlled media network RT of conspiracy to violate the Foreign Agents Registration Act, conspiracy to commit money laundering and of allegedly launching a $10 million propaganda scheme that enlisted popular right-wing social media influencers. The indictment describes, but does not mention by name, Tenet Media, which has partnered with commentators Pool, Dave Rubin, Lauren Southern, Benny Johnson, Matt Christiansen, and Tayler Hansen. Pool matches the indictment's description of "Commentator-2", who it alleges agreed to provide content to Tenet Media in exchange for "$100k per weekly episode." In his response to the indictment on Twitter, Pool, who had previously stated that Ukraine was one of the United States' enemies, stated that he was unaware of the company's connections to Russian funding and declared himself a victim of the alleged scheme. U.S. Attorney General Merrick Garland said "the company never disclosed to the influencers – or to their millions of followers – its ties to RT and the Russian government."

==== Other activities ====
In 2014, Pool helped launch Tagg.ly, a mobile app that watermarks photos. Pool said he was interested in this kind of application due to experiences where others used his photographs without attribution.

In 2019, he co-founded the news company Subverse, which raised $1 million in 22 hours via regulation crowdfunding in 2019, surpassing the previous record on Wefunder. The service was later renamed SCNR. Pool partnered with Emily Molli and former Vice editor-in-chief Rocco Castoro, although Pool later fired both of them in January 2021.

In 2022, he collaborated with drummer Pete Parada to release two singles, "Genocide (Losing My Mind)" and "Only Ever Wanted". "Only Ever Wanted" reached the No. 2 spot on the global iTunes chart. The single was most downloaded on the Billboard charts in September 2022 in Alternative Digital Song Sales. Both singles reached the No. 1 spot on iTunes.

In May 2025, Pool was a guest on the Bill Maher podcast Club Random.

=== Singles ===
Peak chart positions
Year	Title	US Digital Sales	Emerging Artists	US Rock	US Rock and Alternative	US Alternative	US Alternative Digital	UK Singles	UK Singles Downloads	Label
2020	"Will of The People"	—	—	—	—	—	17	—	—	Trash House Records
2022	"Genocide (Losing My Mind)" (featuring Pete Parada)	4	—	—	—	—	—	—	2	Trash House Records
2022	"Only Ever Wanted"(featuring Pete Parada)	2	—	21	24	16	1	82	81	Trash House Records
2023	"Together Again"	6	9	—	—	—	—	—	—	Trash House Records
"—" denotes releases that failed to chart or were not released

== Views ==
Scholars have identified Pool as part of a broader group of 'alt-lite' figures who frame themselves as disaffected liberals, a strategy understood to convey authenticity to sympathetic audiences. In 2019, Pool described himself as a centrist or "center libertarian left", and rejected a left–right political paradigm for both self-description and in other contexts, instead dividing the public into those who are "discerning" and "skeptical" regarding mainstream media (which Pool describes as intertwined with left-wing politics) and those who are "undiscerning" and "uninitiated", Pool has criticized anti-fascist protestors and progressive social justice movements. He had said that "the news is dying" and that in trying to appeal to young people with sensationalism, it skews towards liberal and left-leaning audiences.A 2019 article in the journal Television & New Media analyzed Pool and two other YouTube influencers, Dave Rubin and Blaire White, as combining "micro-celebrity practices with a reactionary political standpoint." Prior to Occupy Wall Street in 2011, Pool sometimes described himself as being anti-authoritarian or "pro-transparency", but not as very political.

A July 2019 Vice article described Pool as "a right-wing media figure", while another Vice article from the same month described him as "lefty" and "progressive". In 2019, Politico said Pool "describes himself as a pro-Bernie Sanders social liberal" but said his "views on issues including social media bias and immigration often align with conservatives."

According to Al Jazeera in 2020, "Pool has amplified claims that conservative media endure persecution and bias at the hands of tech companies." On August 24, 2020, Pool announced his support for Donald Trump in the 2020 United States presidential election, writing that he felt alienated by changes he perceived in the modern left.

In 2021, the Southern Poverty Law Center (SPLC) described Pool as a "pro-Trump social media personality" who "uses his YouTube show to showcase far-right extremists." In 2022, NBC News referred to Pool as a "right-wing influencer". BBC News in 2023 said Pool's podcasts "cover right-wing talking points and conspiracy theories." The New York Times in 2023 described Pool's podcast as "extreme right-wing" and Pool himself as "right-wing" and a "provocateur". Le Monde in 2024 described Pool as a "star influencer" of the "American far right", and a 2023 article in the Journal of Quantitative Description described Pool as "extreme right".

Pool has criticized aid to Ukraine as a provocation against Russia, and called Ukraine "one of the greatest enemies of our nation" in 2024, after allegations that a Ukrainian was involved in the Nord Stream pipelines sabotage. In July 2026, Pool recanted after Laura Loomer's visit to the country, stating that he saw the nation as "fighting for their very existence." Pool supported Trump in the 2024 United States presidential election.

=== Meeting with Netanyahu ===
In April 2025, Pool was one of a group of podcasters who met with Israeli prime minister Benjamin Netanyahu in the Blair House in Washington D.C., as part of an ongoing effort to push back against anti-Israel trends in the right-wing media world:

Among those in attendance were podcasters including Dave Rubin, Tim Pool and former White House press secretary Sean Spicer, writers Bethany Mandel and David J. Harris Jr., influencer Jessica Kraus, Commentary senior editor Seth Mandel and Federalist editor-in-chief Mollie Hemingway.

Pool expressed concerns about increased antisemitism and anti-Zionism in the pro-Trump podcasting space, according to sources in the room. Pool famously had Kanye West on his podcast, and the rapper walked out mid-interview after Pool pushed back against antisemitic comments.

Responding to Pool, Netanyahu said that is the reason he invited the group to meet with him.

== Personal life ==
Pool lives in West Virginia. Prior to the Occupy movement, Pool lived with his brother in Newport News, Virginia, where he played guitar and made skateboarding videos. Pool married Alison Neubauer in 2025.
