= Arynne Wexler =

American stand-up comedian and conservative commentator

- Born: c. 1993 (age 32–33)
- Education: Wharton School, University of Pennsylvania

Comedy career
- Medium: Stand-up; social media; podcasting
- Genres: Political satire; Observational comedy
- Subjects: American politics; culture; Jewish identity; New York City life
- Website: arynnewexler.com

Arynne Wexler (born c. 1993) is an American stand-up comedian, writer, and conservative political commentator. A former finance professional, she rose to prominence in 2024 and 2025 through short-form political video commentary, amassing several hundred thousand followers across X, TikTok, and Instagram, and has performed stand-up at clubs including the New York Comedy Club and Eastville Comedy Club. In 2025, The Algemeiner named her to its list of the top 100 people positively influencing Jewish life.

== Early life and education ==
Wexler was raised in the New York metropolitan area. She graduated from the Wharton School of the University of Pennsylvania and worked at Goldman Sachs before leaving finance for media and comedy.

== Career ==
=== Commentary and social media ===
Wexler launched her political commentary accounts in late 2023 and, according to The Algemeiner, emerged as one of the most widely viewed Jewish conservative voices of 2024–2025, accumulating millions of views across Instagram, YouTube, and X. By April 2025, she had roughly 400,000 followers across X, TikTok, and Instagram, describing herself as "just a nonlib girl in a superlib world." Her writing has appeared in The Federalist, The Blaze, and Tablet.

Much of her commentary concerns Jewish identity and support for Israel; her output after the October 7, 2023, Hamas-led attacks focused on campus antisemitism and defenses of Israel's military response. Writing in Tablet, she described resisting erosion of Jewish peoplehood as the true meaning of Hanukkah.

She has appeared as a commentator on Fox News programs including Jesse Watters Primetime, on Fox News Radio, and on podcasts including The Rubin Report and The Adam Carolla Show. She has been quoted in features on young conservatives in Vanity Fair, which reported her view that a new kind of city conservative had emerged who was unafraid and openly MAGA, and in The Washington Post.

=== White House "new media" briefing ===
On April 28, 2025, Wexler was seated in the front row of the first White House "influencer briefing" held by press secretary Karoline Leavitt for pro-Trump online media figures, and was called on for the first question. Before asking about enforcement of executive orders concerning transgender athletes in girls' sports, Wexler thanked the administration for its immigration enforcement, saying: "I can attest to the deportations in Florida, my Uber drivers finally speak English again."

The remark drew widespread media attention. HuffPost characterized it as an "anti-immigrant joke" and described the briefings as gatherings of sympathetic pro-Trump voices, while Leavitt and the White House defended the sessions as reflecting the media habits of contemporary American audiences.

=== Stand-up comedy ===
Wexler performs politically themed stand-up from a conservative perspective, addressing life as a political minority in New York, liberal–conservative cultural divides, and current events. She has performed at New York City venues including the New York Comedy Club, Eastville Comedy Club, and the Grisly Pear, and headlines touring shows. She also hosts the podcast NONNEGOTIABLE with Arynne Wexler.

== Political views ==
Wexler is a supporter of Donald Trump and a critic of progressive politics, particularly in New York City, where she grew up as a self-described political minority. In a June 2025 Washington Post feature on conservative dating culture, she attracted attention for a derisive description of liberal women that characterized them as unkempt Marxists in polyamorous relationships. By early 2026, she had publicly tempered her assessment of the conservative movement's cultural momentum, telling The Washington Post: "We were cool for 2½ minutes — that time has passed."

Her pro-Israel advocacy has drawn praise from Jewish community organizations—The Algemeiner credited her with bringing new relatability and credibility to conservative commentary—as well as criticism from pro-Palestinian activists.

== Recognition ==
In 2025, The Algemeiner included Wexler in its annual list of the top 100 people positively influencing Jewish life.
