= The Rubin Report =

Political news talk show hosted by Dave Rubin

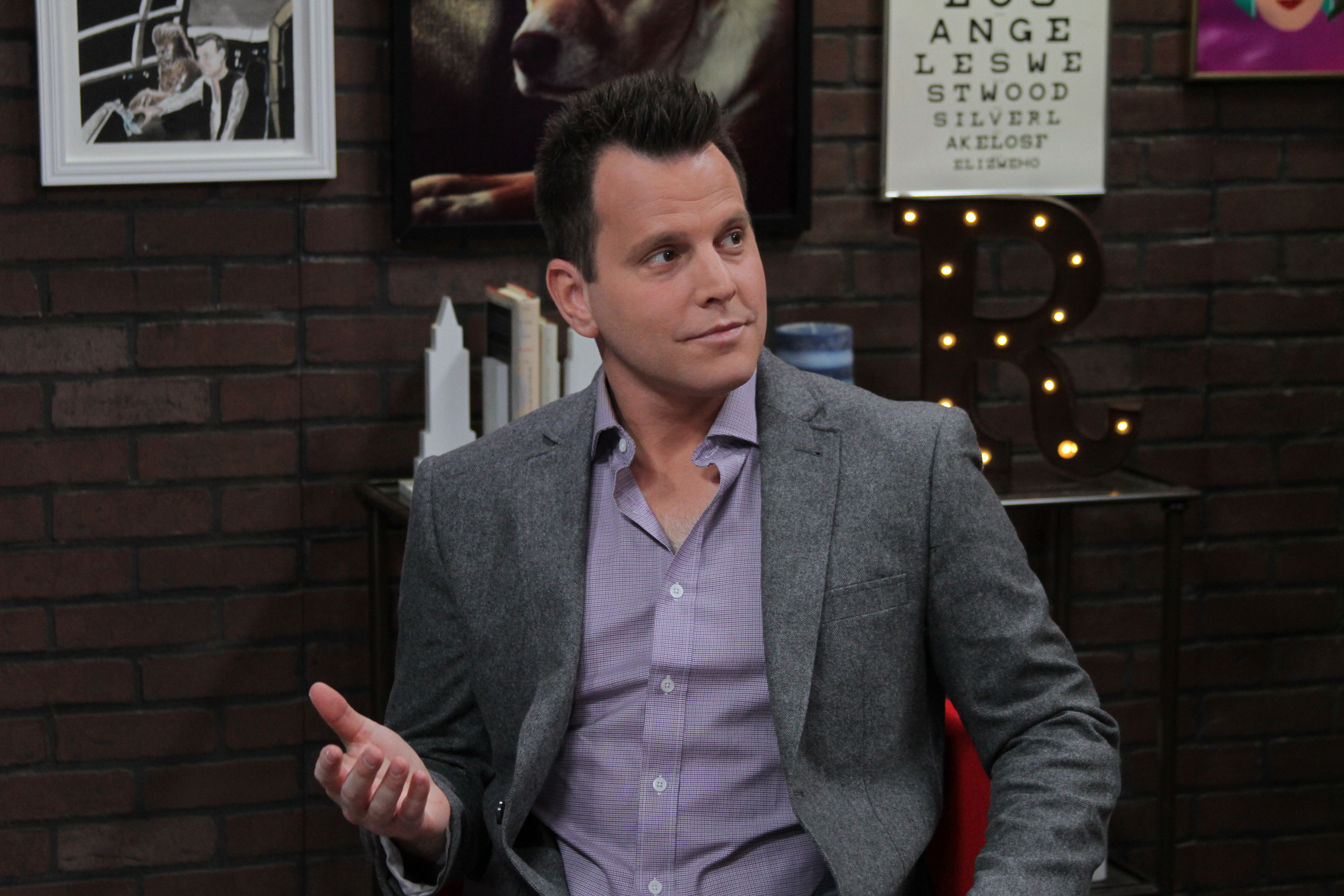
- Genre: Political commentary
- Created by: Dave Rubin; David Janet
- Presented by: Dave Rubin
- Country of origin: United States
- Original language: English

Production
- Executive producer: David Janet
- Production location: Los Angeles, California
- Camera setup: Multi-Camera
- Production companies: The Young Turks 2013–2015; RYOT 2015; Ora TV 2015–2016; Independently Produced 2016–present

Original release
- Release: February 16, 2013 – present

The Rubin Report

YouTube information
- Channel: The Rubin Report
- Genre: political news talk show
- Subscribers: 2.95 million
- Views: 2.08 billion
- Last updated: 23 June 2025

The Rubin Report is a conservative political news talk show hosted by Dave Rubin, airing on BlazeTV and YouTube. In the show, Rubin interviews authors, activists, journalists, comedians, actors, and professors.

== History ==
Dave Rubin left The Six Pack radio show on Sirius XM Satellite Radio in New York City in 2013 to launch a political talk show called The Rubin Report in Los Angeles, California. His show was originally syndicated on The Young Turks Network, where he was also a frequent stand-in host and commentator. In 2014 he began to have a fall-out with The Young Turks after they began criticizing Sam Harris and Bill Maher after Maher and Harris had gotten into a tense exchange with Ben Affleck about the relation between terrorism and Islamic doctrine.

On October 23, 2014, Sam Harris sat down for three hours of debate with Cenk Uygur, the founder of The Young Turks. Rubin described some of his frustrations with that exchange as follows: "The way he (Uygur) became the leader of the group just relentlessly lying about Sam, and then to sit there for three hours with the guy and just double down on every lie—it showed just such a flaw in character." Rubin subsequently left The Young Turks in March 2015. Harris was the guest on the first full-length episode of The Rubin Report in September 2015.

In 2015, the show briefly moved to RYOT News. In August 2015, Larry King's Ora TV picked up the show which debuted on September 9, 2015. The Rubin Report became the network's third political commentary show alongside PoliticKING with Larry King and Jesse Ventura's Off the Grid.

On June 13, 2016, Rubin announced in a YouTube video he and his crew were leaving Ora TV and founding his own independent production company to continue The Rubin Report on YouTube.

In May 2018, The Rubin Report received funds of more than $30,000 per month on Patreon.

In 2019, The Rubin Report became available on BlazeTV, a conservative subscription video service run by Glenn Beck.

In 2020, Rubin moved the site to Locals, a crowdfunding platform he cofounded.

The show is partially funded by George Mason University's Institute for Humane Studies.

== Format ==
From 2013 to 2015, The Rubin Report featured a panel of two guests and covered weekly news stories. After launching on Ora TV in 2015, the show shifted to discussing ideas relating to politics and religion through one on one interviews and monologues from Rubin. The Rubin Report consists of three segments: Direct Message, The Sit Down, and The Panel.

- "The Direct Message" segment is a monologue delivered by Rubin that opens each episode. The segment features Rubin's personal views on the topic that will be discussed with the guest or panel in that episode.
- "The Sit Down" segment features a one-on-one interview between Rubin and the guest. Guests are usually authors, journalists, comedians, or professors.
- "The Panel" segment features a panel of two guests and focuses on a theme within current events.

== Politics ==
On The Rubin Report, Rubin identifies as a conservative. Rubin previously identified as a classical liberal and as a progressive while he was affiliated with The Young Turks.

The show often focuses on criticizing elements within the progressive movement, which he refers to as the "regressive left", a term coined by activist Maajid Nawaz. Rubin has stated that "regressives are the left's version of the tea party", and has characterized progressivism as a "mental disorder." According to Rubin, his show "has become a hub for misunderstood or canceled people or to-be-canceled people to express themselves honestly".

== Reception ==
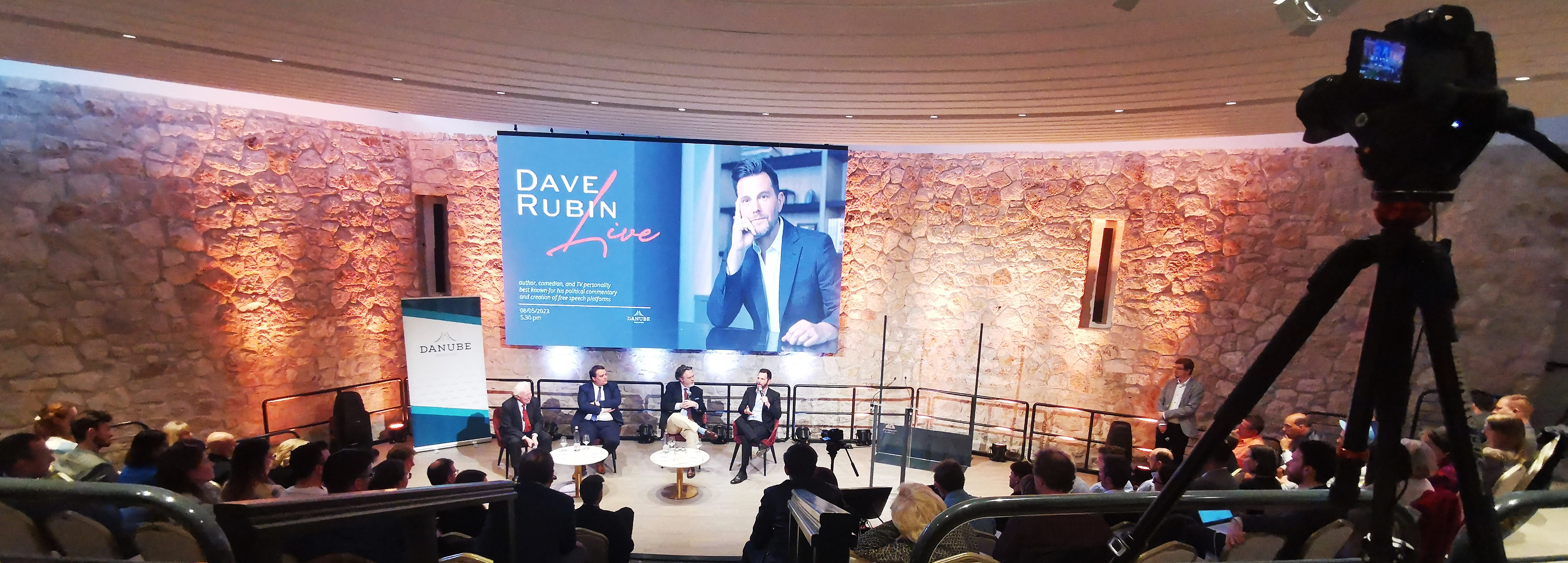
Dave Rubin Live - Danube Institute Budapest

In August 2016, an article in The Daily Telegraph said The Rubin Report "understands the importance of open debate", had a "rebellious appeal" and "outspoken-but-interesting" guests such as John McCain, Ayaan Hirsi Ali and Tommy Robinson. Fans of the show support Rubin for his willingness to have open dialogue with academics, ex-Muslims, disaffected progressives, as well as fringe alt-right figures.

According to an article in The Daily Beast, Rubin has "positively platformed and appeared with bigots, ultra-nationalist identitarians, and hoax conspiracy theorists". An article in Der Spiegel said Rubin's show "provides a platform for alt-right voices in a pseudo-credible setting." Guests on The Rubin Report have included alt-right figureheads such as Stefan Molyneux, Milo Yiannopoulos and conspiracy theorist Paul Joseph Watson.

An article in Tablet said Rubin "almost never tries to convince his guests that they're wrong". Journalist Cathy Young, who has been a guest on The Rubin Report and praised Rubin's interview with James Damore, said Rubin's style of "asking his guests sympathetic questions, almost never challenging them, and often reinforcing their answers with enthusiastic agreement" was unsuccessful when interviewing guests who were unreasonable or misrepresented themselves. Young gave the example of Stefan Molyneux who, despite his "long record of misogyny and racism", "masquerades as a rational 'new centrist'."

According to The Daily Beast, Rubin's show hosted an "uncritical" interview with Lauren Southern where she accused the Canadian Nazi Party of being "backed up and egged on" by a Jewish organisation that wanted more "hate crimes to point out". The Daily Beast article said "at its worst moments, [The Rubin Report] is essentially a re-packaging of reactionary disinformation in a shiny, smiling, high-definition talk show pageant." In a Current Affairs article, political commentator Nathan J. Robinson described The Rubin Report as "Dave Rubin’s slobbering sycophantic interview show".

Rubin said his non-confrontational interviewing style was inspired by Larry King. King said Rubin was "smart and passionate" about politics but he had a different style since Rubin was more "open to giving his opinions".

Sam Harris has indicated to Rubin that he believes The Rubin Report has not devoted enough criticism to Trumpism.
