= Evie Magazine =

American women's magazine

- Cover of 2024 edition featuring Hannah Neeleman
- Editor-in-chief: Brittany Martinez
- Categories: Women's, fashion, lifestyle, health
- Frequency: Annual
- Founder: Brittany Martinez
- Founded: February 2019
- Company: Evie Media Group
- Country: United States
- Language: English
- Website: www.eviemagazine.com

Evie Magazine is an American alt-right (Note: Sources characterizing Evie Magazine as alt-right:) women's magazine. It was founded in February 2019 by husband and wife Gabriel Hugoboom and Brittany Martinez, (Note: Martinez uses her maiden name, Martinez, on Evie, and her married name, Hugoboom, on X (formerly Twitter) and TikTok.) with Martinez as editor-in-chief. Evie has published conspiracy theories, (Note: Sources describing Evie's publication of conspiracy theories:) pseudoscientific content and anti-vaccine misinformation. (Note: Misinformation about COVID-19 and vaccines:) The physical magazine is released annually.

== History ==
Evie Magazine was founded in February 2019 by husband and wife Gabriel Hugoboom and Brittany Martinez. Evie has described itself as a "conservative Cosmo".

In September 2022, Evie launched a femtech app called 28byEvie (later renamed to 28.co), also called 28, which requires users to input the first day of their last period to calculate the menstrual phases. The app's pro-life rhetoric and scientific basis are controversial. The app is funded by Peter Thiel among others.

In December 2024, Evie released a "raw milkmaid" dress aimed at tradwives.

By February 2025, according to internal analytics provided by the magazine's founders, Evie's social media content had garnered approximately 100 million views. By April 2025, Evie had 210,000 Instagram followers. Evie also maintains a TikTok account.

In May 2025, Evie was sued by Elle magazine owner Hachette Filipacchi Presse for trademark infringement. Hachette alleged that Evie's logo was nearly identical to that of Elle. The case was settled and dismissed in November 2025.

== Content ==
Evie is an antifeminist publication. It has been characterized as alt-right and far-right. In 2023, the Southern Poverty Law Center identified Evie as a preeminent publication supporting the male supremacist politics of the hard right. In 2025, The New York Times described Evie's content as promoting "positions that are fringe even within conservative circles — criticisms of no-fault divorce and I.V.F., for example — packaged in a fun and approachable format." Wired characterized Evie's approach to its content as "a classic example of soft power in action—just as the appeal of mid-century Hollywood films wasn't necessarily the anti-Communist messaging but the glitz and glamour, the strength of Evie's politics are in its pretense that it doesn't have any."

Evie has published misinformation about COVID-19 and vaccines, transphobic content and conspiracy theories, including QAnon, and Pizzagate.

Articles in Evie have denounced the body positivity movement and urged women to stop using hormonal contraception. In 2023, Rolling Stone described Evie as "a girlboss-ified Breitbart" and reported that it uses the traditional format of women's fashion publications, including Met Gala slideshows and breakdowns of Taylor Swift's Eras tour outfits, to attract a Generation Z audience.

In 2021, Vice said that Evie "attempt[s] to fit vaccine skepticism and outright COVID denial into what's represented as a 'classical' and 'traditional' worldview... While they are, in and of themselves, nothing especially original, Evie's anti-vax blogs provide[s] a neat little window into how COVID denialism and misinformation are being marketed in one particularly cynical corner of right-wing women's media."

In March 2024, Evie was cited by The Washington Post as an example of "prominent conservative commentators ... sowing misinformation as a way to discourage the use of birth control."

In August 2024, Futurism characterized Evie as an alt-right women's lifestyle publication whose content "range[s] from innocuous lifestyle posts about fashion trends to a range of bizarre and often harmful content including vaccine misinformation, a bevy of wildly unscientific assertions about women's health, anti-trans fearmongering, unsupported 'psyop' conspiracies, and pro-life messaging that often includes false claims about safe and effective abortion drugs." It added, "In other words, Evie isn't a reliable source of news and information, nor is it simply a conservative outlet. It's a deeply conspiratorial website that ignores scientific facts and critical reasoning", citing an Evie article asserting that a "recent projection" had found that 45% of women were expected to be single and childless by 2030; the estimate was from a Morgan Stanley report published in September 2019.

According to NBC News which talks about the case of Evie's attitude towards birth control, the studies about the matters discussed are conflicting and suitable methods should be decided on a case-by-case basis: "Rather, health care experts have said that doctors should discuss any potential mood effects of the medication with patients, as other studies have contradicted the 2018 study, and pregnancy can also have mood side effects." Dr. Danielle Jones, an OB-GYN, said that fertility awareness methods are complicated and could fail, while Mayo Clinic said that fertility cycle tracking is less effective than other methods.

The New York Times has described some perspectives published on Evie as "unconventional for a right-leaning publication", such as sharing sex tips with disclaimers saying "married women only", advising women to resist being pressured into sexual acts, criticizing misogyny in online communities, and having models wear bikinis and crop tops. Martinez has said that Evie was early in writing about topics such as criticism of hookup culture and women's hormonal health that have since entered the mainstream.

Evie publishes articles critical of both hormonal birth control and non-hormonal birth control, such as copper IUDs and condoms, and has published stories of women suffering deadly side effects such as blood clots from hormonal birth control. Print editions of Evie include advertisements for their fertility planning app, 28, which suggests food and exercises for different stages of the user's menstrual cycle and discourages hormonal birth control. Evie also sells birth control "detox" supplements through the app, with advertisements saying "Goodbye toxicity."

Evie's 2024 edition praised Donald Trump's nomination of anti-vaccine activist Robert F. Kennedy Jr. for Secretary of Health and Human Services, and described Dutch far-right commentator Eva Vlaardingerbroek as a "shieldmaiden", a term that has been co-opted by the alt-right to describe the female faces of white supremacy and conservatism.

== Contributors and staff ==
Contributors to Evie include:

- Lauren Chen

Notable staff members include:

- Vani Hari, food editor

== See also ==
- List of women's magazines
