= 2024 Tenet Media investigation =

Investigation into an American conservative media company

- Industry: Media
- Founded: January 2022
- Founders: Lauren Chen; Liam Donovan
- Defunct: September 5, 2024
- Headquarters: Nashville, Tennessee, U.S.
- Key people: Liam Donovan (president)

Tenet Media was an American right-wing media company founded by conservative political commentator Lauren Chen and her husband, Liam Donovan, in 2022. Describing itself as a "network of heterodox commentators that focus on Western political and cultural issues", Tenet Media featured six right-wing influencers: Matt Christiansen, Tayler Hansen, Benny Johnson, Tim Pool, Dave Rubin, and Lauren Southern.

In 2024 the U.S. charged two Russian media executives in a US$10 million scheme to illegally fund Tenet Media and influence it to promote Russian propaganda. The company shut down shortly afterward.

== Topics ==
According to the United States Department of Justice (DOJ), many of Tenet's videos "contain commentary on events and issues in the U.S., such as immigration, inflation, and other topics related to domestic and foreign policy. While the views expressed in the videos are not uniform, most are directed to the publicly stated goals of the Government of Russia and RT — to amplify domestic divisions in the United States."

Tenet's podcasts featured prominent Republican figures, including Republican National Committee co-chair Lara Trump, Project 2025 director Paul Dans, Vivek Ramaswamy, Kash Patel and Kari Lake. Tenet's content included coverage of illegal immigration, diversity in video games, supposed racism against white people, free speech and Elon Musk, as well as climate change denial content.

Around February 2023, Tenet sought to hire two right-wing commentators with 2.4 million YouTube subscribers and 1.3 million YouTube subscribers to produce videos. The two eventually signed on, and "Commentator-1" and "Commentator-2" each received over $400,000 per month for producing political videos for Tenet. According to the DOJ indictment, the two defendants requested that Tenet influencers produce content blaming the Crocus City Hall attack on Ukraine and the U.S.

== Indictment of Russian nationals ==
Two Russian nationals were federally indicted by the DOJ on September 4, 2024, for their alleged activities relating to Tenet. The company was identified only as "Company-1" in the indictment but descriptive information allowed several media sources to identify it as Tenet. According to an unsealed indictment, the two indicted Russians were employees of the Russian state-controlled media company RT who were charged with failing to register as a foreign agent, and allegedly funneling around $10 million into Tenet in order to "distribute content to U.S. audiences with hidden Russian government messaging".

The indictment of the two Russians stated: "The unsealed indictment said the founders of the unidentified company — widely reported to be Tenet Media — knew their funding came from 'the Russians.'" It alleges the Tenet founders masked their Russian funding by creating a fictitious persona of a wealthy European sponsor, "Eduard Grigoriann." The charged Russian nationals, Kostiantyn Kalashnikov and Elena Afanasyeva, were involved in day-to-day operations of Tenet by fall 2023, using false names to conceal they were Russian RT employees. The indictment alleges the founders acknowledged in private communications that their "investors" were actually the "Russians."

Attorney general Merrick Garland said Tenet "never disclosed to the influencers or to their millions of followers its ties to RT and the Russian government." Prosecutors also allege the $10 million was a Russian money laundering operation.

Right-wing influencers hired by the company, including Tim Pool, Benny Johnson and Dave Rubin, have said they were unwitting 'victims' of the alleged scheme."

Following the indictment, YouTube terminated Tenet Media and other channels run by Chen. Prior to its removal, Tenet had around 316,000 subscribers. Tenet influencer Tayler Hansen announced on September 5 that the company had shut down.

The Biden administration said the indictment was part of a wider effort to counter a major Russian government effort to influence the 2024 US presidential election that included sanctions on ten individuals and entities, and the seizure of 32 internet domains. Unlike in 2016 and 2020, when Russia employed armies of trolls and bots to reach Americans, with dubious results, in 2024 Russia had pivoted to exploit established conservative social media influencers to reach Americans with pro-Russia messaging. Russian official Leonid Slutsky responded by characterizing the sanctions as "a clear example of a 'witch hunt,' pressure on freedom of speech and vulgar censorship."
