= The New Norm =

American adult animated sitcom

- Genre: Animated sitcom; Political satire; Black Comedy
- Created by: Akiva Prell; Sophia Prell
- Developed by: José Behar
- Voices of: JP Sears; Dave Rubin; Larry Elder
- Country of origin: United States
- Original language: English
- No. of seasons: 1
- No. of episodes: 5

Production
- Running time: 1–3 minutes

Original release
- Network: X (formerly Twitter)
- Release: June 25, 2024 – present

The New Norm is an American adult animated sitcom web series created by Akiva and Sophia Prell and developed by José Behar. It is based on the Webcomic Woke World, which itself is loosely inspired by All in the Family. Developed and marketed as "The First Animated Sit-Com [sic] on X", the series premiered with a three-minute pilot on June 25, 2024, and was released on the series' X account. JP Sears stars as the titular Norm, alongside a voice cast also including Dave Rubin and Larry Elder.

== Synopsis ==
A sneak peek of the show's sixth episode titled "Full Disclosure", made entirely by artificial intelligence.

The series chronicles the life of Norm (JP Sears), a conservative man whose life is turned upside down when Chaz (Dave Rubin), a non-binary influencer, is sent to live with his family in an attempt to "re-educate" Norm.

== Cast and characters ==
Much of the series' voice cast is uncredited.

=== Main ===
- JP Sears as Norm, a right-wing trophy shop worker who is opposed to the increasingly "woke" nature of America
- Dave Rubin as Chaz, a non-binary influencer who moves in with Norm and his family as a form of parole to re-educate him
- Larry Elder as Charlie, Norm's like-minded best friend and boss
- Chloe, Norm's left-wing daughter who immediately develops an infatuation for Chaz, uncredited
- Janice, Norm's pacifistic wife who attempts to keep peace during family arguments, uncredited
- OMNI, an AI robot in Norm's tracking anklet programmed to call out any of Norm's statements it judges to be offensive, uncredited

=== Guests ===
- Uncredited as Hillary Clinton
- Uncredited as Vladimir Putin
- Uncredited as an unnamed "DEI hire"
- Uncredited as Dave Portnoy

== Episodes ==
No.	Title	Original release date
1	"Pilot"	June 25, 2024
Norm, a staunchly conservative man, has been placed under temporary house arrest with a tracking anklet controlled by the artificial intelligence OMNI after complaining to his daughter Chloe's school board for teaching her about gender theory. As he laments that his favorite beer has been given a rainbow design on the can in support of the LGBTQ+ community, he learns that Chloe's new love interest Chaz, a non-binary influencer who owns a non-binary dog named Billie, will be staying at the house, and that he will be released on conditional parole after Chaz "re-educates" him as part of a new government program. In the end, Elon Musk arrives to celebrate X as "the home of free speech" with the characters in a short musical number, after which Norm's wife Janice announces the family has received tickets to Walt Disney World, much to Norm's horror.
2	"Electile Dysfunction"	October 31, 2024
Norm and his like-minded best friend and boss Charlie are on one side of a crowd opposite Chaz and Chloe at a rally hosted by Donald Trump and Elon Musk. Musk saves Trump from an assassination attempt by Hillary Clinton before the two men leave aboard a SpaceX Starship. Chloe and Chaz attempt to leave aboard an Amazon rocket piloted by a "DEI hire" (appearing as a drag queen) and end up fighting with Norm and Charlie over how they are all stuck with each other. Vladimir Putin reveals that turning Americans against each other was part of his master plan to destroy America, but the DEI hire soon crashes into his estate, killing him. With the threat of Russia against America resolved, Chloe and Chaz begin searching for Billie, unaware that the dog is on the Starship with Trump and Musk, dancing to an AI-generated EDM song.
3	"War Games"	November 5, 2024
While Norm, Charlie, Chloe, and Chaz are watching 2024 presidential election news, Janice turns off the TV and encourages everyone to get along. Instead, the group argues, criticizing each other's chosen candidates and political parties. Two scenarios then play out, revealing that, no matter which side wins, the opposing side will riot, leading to all Americans ultimately losing.
4	"Memecoin Episode"	February 19, 2025
In light of Donald Trump successfully launching the virtual currency $TRUMP, Chaz, lamenting the failure of their "Wokecoin" $WOKE, challenges Norm to see if a virtual currency based on him can outcompete their variation. As soon as $NORM is created, it skyrockets in value to over $1 million.
5	"Memecoin Millionaire"	February 19, 2025
Norm realizes the value in his memecoin, but unfortunately, he forgot his password and cannot redeem the money. The episode ends with a message encouraging the audience not to buy Normcoin, as it will give Norm "FOMO".
6	"Full Disclosure"	TBD

== Reception ==
Jacob Weindling of Splinter called it "bigoted babybrained bullshit" and "a perfect window into the low-grade conservative comedian mind".

Writing for UnHerd, Gareth Roberts praised the "well designed" characters and "decent voice performances", but otherwise criticized the show, saying "it is not just terrible but flesh-creepingly awful. The jokes, such as they are, all crash like bags of tools being dropped down a lift shaft".

== AI livestreams ==
Starting on September 10, 2026, various AI-generated livestreams were held on the website "enterglitch.com" as part of their creator program. The livestreams allow for viewers to create their own New Norm episodes by sending suggestions in chat. Topics suggested by viewers included "make norms [sic] belly big and gassy" and "make norm [sic] eat poop", with many such suggestions being accepted. This led to most of these livestreams being only 10-20 minutes long. These livestreams usually happen every 30 minutes on the website.
