= Ben Harvey (American radio personality) =

American radio, television, and podcast personality

Ben Harvey is a radio, television, and podcast personality in New York City.

Early in his career, Harvey worked at WBRU, Brown University's commercial alternative rock station, where he started as a disc jockey at the age of nineteen.

Harvey's first major-market radio stint was at Y100 in Philadelphia, Pennsylvania, where he worked the evening shift starting in 2001. In 2003, Harvey joined 92.3 K-Rock in New York City, where he worked the evening slot. When K-Rock changed formats to become the all-talk Free FM in 2005, Harvey left the station.

In 2007 he started in television at the LGBT-related Here TV, where he hosted numerous podcasts and TV programs. The Ben and Dave Show, which premiered online at heretv.com in October 2007, features Harvey along with his co-host, comedian Dave Rubin. A televised version of the show premiered on Here TV on March 14, 2008 and continued as The Six Pack podcast and radio show on SiriusXM OutQ through 2012. He also hosted a weekly independent podcast "The Bender", "Your Pop Culture & Music Binge."

Harvey was previously an on-air host at SiriusXM BPM but now is president of Sony's Palm Tree Records.

In 2007, Harvey was the recipient of the National Lesbian and Gay Journalists Association Excellence in Online Journalism Award for his role as host of "here! At the Movies", along with director Michael Eldridge and producer Eric Feldman.
