= JP Sears =

American Internet personality and YouTuber

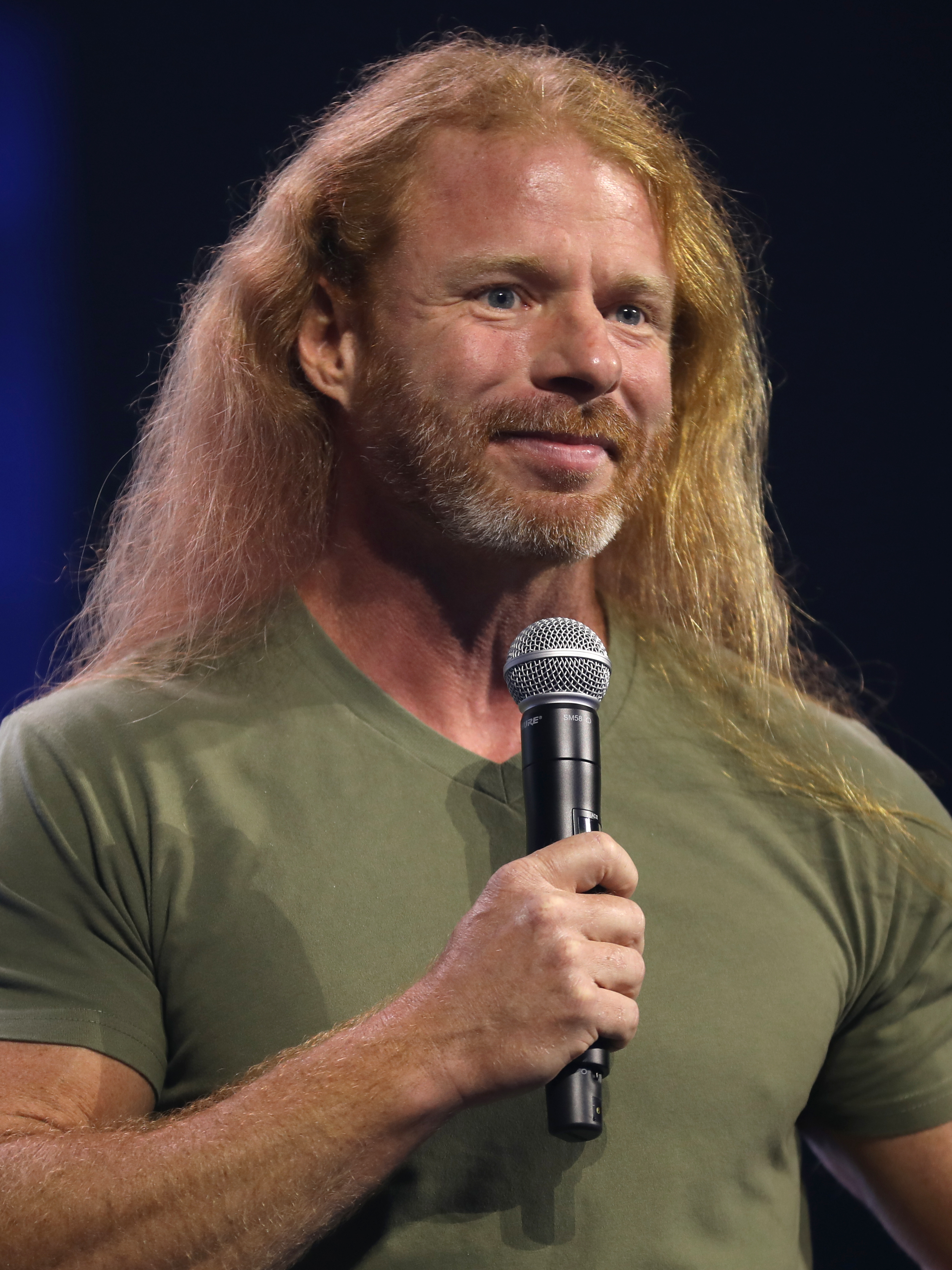
- Sears in 2023
- Born: Jonathan Patrick Sears; Toledo, Ohio, U.S.
- Occupations: YouTuber, comedian
- Years active: 2012–present

YouTube information
- Channel: AwakenWithJP
- Subscribers: 3.02 million
- Views: 602 million
- Last updated: October 6, 2026

Jonathan Patrick Sears is an American YouTube comedian. Sears produces satirical YouTube videos where he parodies lifestyle gurus, wellness coaches, and government policies.

== Biography ==
JP Sears was born in Toledo, Ohio, and raised in Bowling Green, Ohio. According to Sears, he was a class clown in his youth. He attended Bowling Green State University, but withdrew after several months to begin studying holistic culture at the Ohio life coaching school Journeys of Wisdom.

== Career ==
=== Pre-2020 comedy career ===
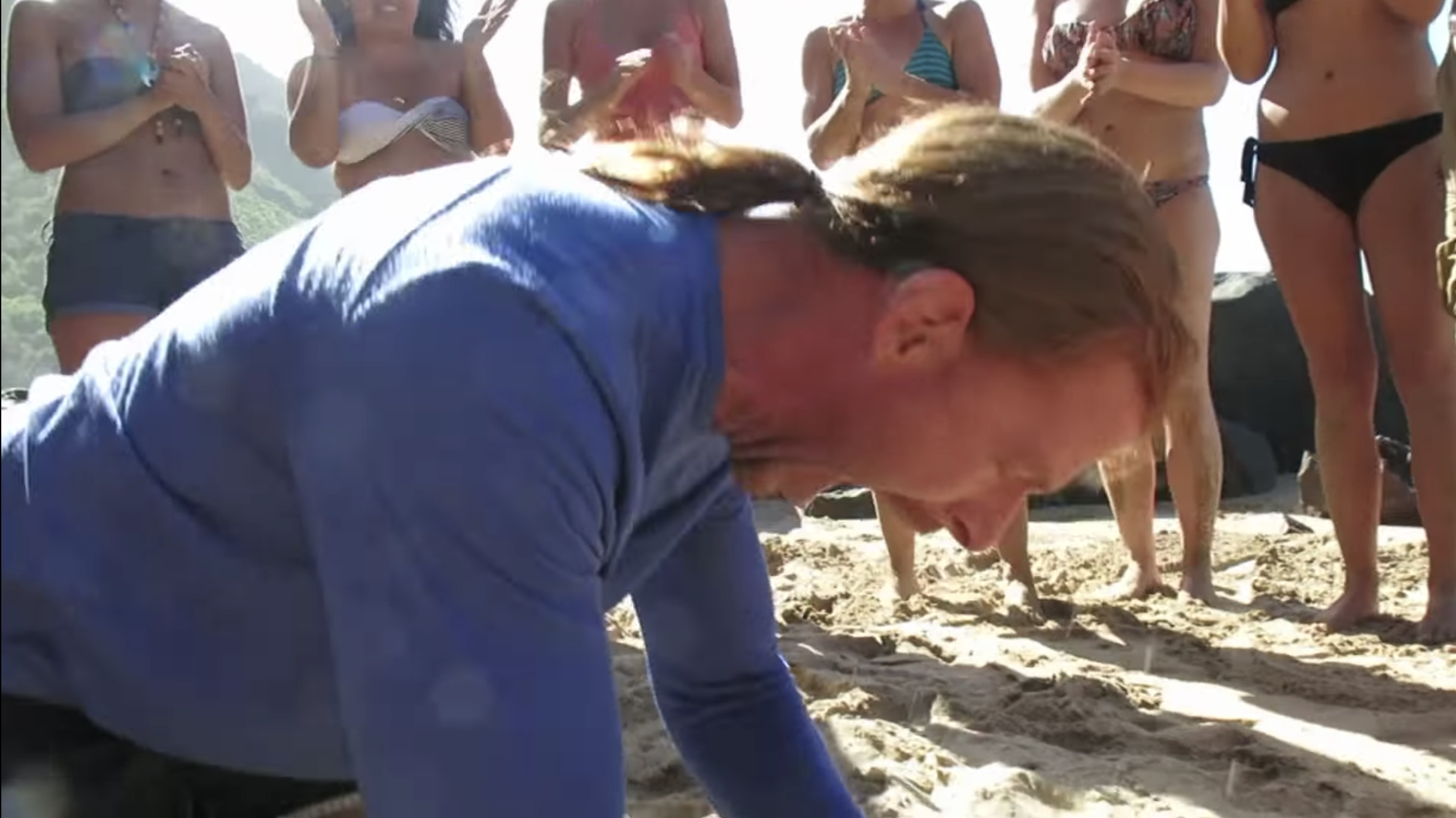
Sears screaming while demonstrating anger management scream therapy in 2013.

In 2004, Sears moved from Ohio to San Diego, California, to begin work as a professional life coach. Prior to his appearance on YouTube, Sears operated the website holistichealthandfitness.com, which featured links to supplements and the website of alternative medicine proponent Joseph Mercola. In 2013, he began uploading YouTube videos providing advice on new age topics.

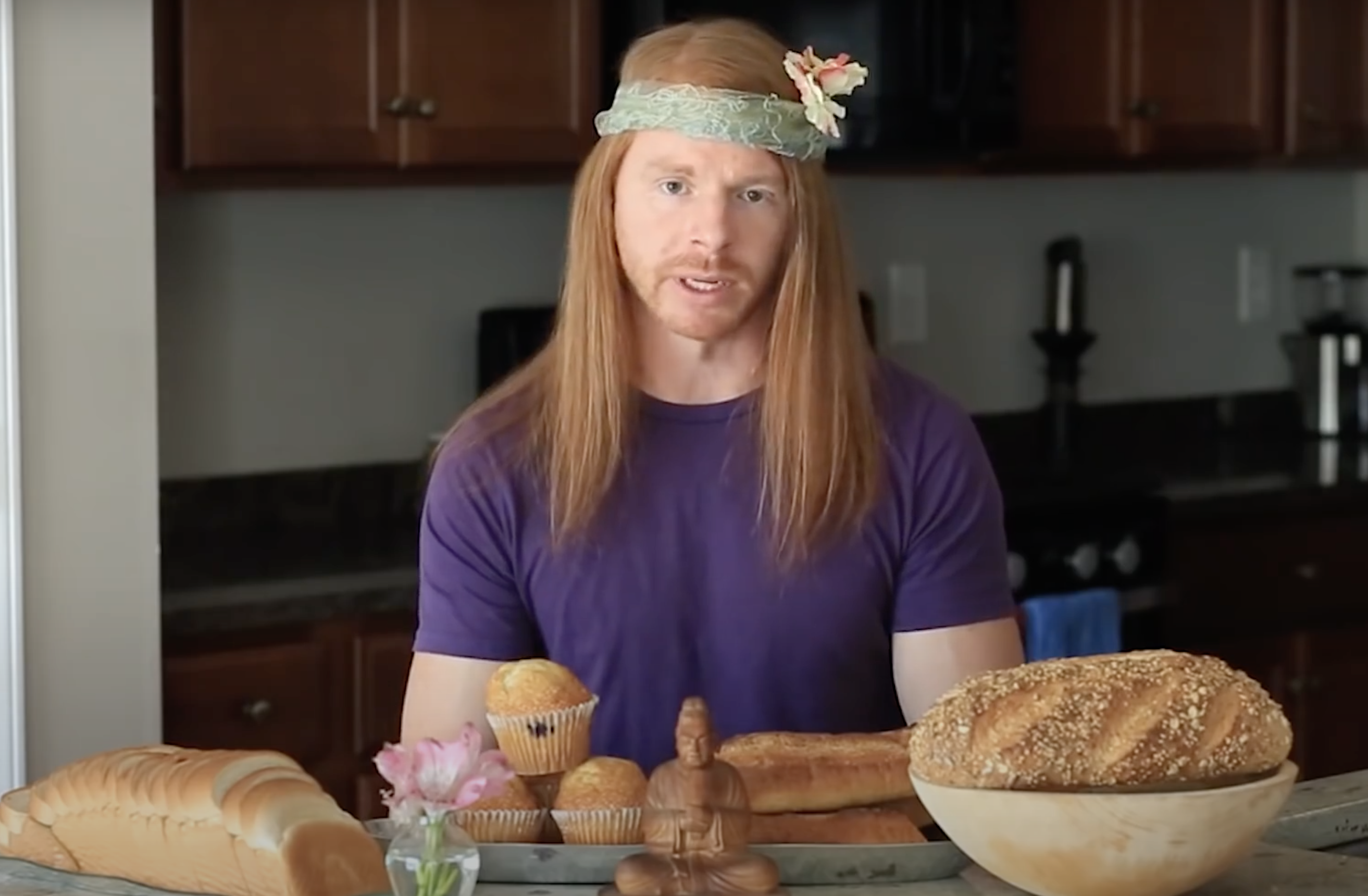
Sears as a hippie in a 2016 video skit

In 2014, Sears relocated to Charleston, South Carolina, after which he changed the tone of his videos from serious life coaching to satirical life coaching. His 2015 YouTube video titled "How to Become Gluten Intolerant" proved popular, receiving over 10 million views. In the video, Sears delivers lines such as "If you're ready to have a ravenous appetite for impossible standards and dogmatic feelings of victimization, then let's get started on what you need to do to become gluten intolerant" in a deadpan and sarcastic manner typical of his YouTube content's approach to satire.

Sears primarily performs as a satirist. In an interview with the Naples Daily News, Sears said he uses comedy to share "sincere life advice" and balances "the sincere and the satirical" while eschewing the idea that "you're either serious, like Deepak Chopra, or you're only joking around like a comedian". Sears has rejected being categorized as either "sincere" or "humorous", explaining that he is both and the premise of the question is like asking, "Do you have a right hand or do you have a left hand?" According to Sears, all of his parody is drawn from aspects of his own life.

Sears was cited by Australia's ABC News as one of "a growing number of comedians satirising fad gluten-free and grain elimination diets".

In March 2017, Sears recorded a segment with CBC Radio's "Early Edition" in which host Samantha Garvey joined him in a tour of Vancouver's "most spiritually trendy spots".

In 2018, Sears recorded a video roast about New Jersey and then a similar roast filmed the same year about Boulder, described by Westword as "hilarious". Sears speculated about "running his own dog, Zephyr, for mayor". But columnist Michael Roberts ultimately concluded that Sears "could always run for mayor in Zephyr's place, especially given his high public profile".

Sears has also produced satirical roasts of Spokane, Phoenix, Portland, and other locations; however, a 2017 satire of Costa Rica was less well received by residents, and Sears subsequently pulled the video from his channel and issued an apology after it was criticized by Costa Rican ambassador to India Mariela Cruz. News outlet Costa Rica Hoy observed that Costa Ricans familiar with Sears's satirical style would probably be amused by the video, while those who were unfamiliar with it would not. The Costa Rica News, an English-language newspaper in Costa Rica, observed that "this is a great lesson in cultural differences, what made JP's popularity in the States, the use of satire and parody is not going to be a successful tactic in Latin America ... JP did realize that he had erred and sought to rectify his actions in a very public way ... Needless to say, JP will not be doing any videos about Costa Rica, he will be sticking to subjects he knows well."

=== COVID era comedy ===
During the COVID-19 pandemic in 2020, Sears's content shifted towards support of conservative political views. In an interview with the Spokesman-Review, Sears remarked that he believed freedoms were threatened during the pandemic, which caused his political shift, though he was not political before. According to Sears, "During the spring of 2020, me being pro-freedom caused some backlash," but said that becoming a conservative comic "turned out to be great for my career." Also according to Sears, there are fewer conservative comics, and therefore he has a "niche" audience.

Sears began attempting to discredit some of the public health measures taken against COVID-19 and promote COVID-19 conspiracy theories. Science communicator Jonathan Jarry of the Office for Science and Society, McGill University described Sears as part of the conspirituality trend, combining conspiracy theories and New Age spirituality. He notes that Sears has promoted claims about COVID-19 such as that Vitamin D provides protection against the disease, has referred to masks as "face suffocators", and had a video removed by YouTube "for spreading unfounded conspiracy theories".

=== Post-COVID era comedy ===
As of 2024, Sears also stars in The New Norm as Norm, a right-wing man who is opposed to the increasingly "woke" nature of America.

== Political activities ==
In February 2021, Sears appeared as a speaker at the Health Freedom Summit, an online event featuring speakers promoting freedom of choice for body autonomy and vaccinations, opposing mask mandates, and protecting homeschool rights.

Sears performed at Republican politician Dan Crenshaw's Crenshaw Youth Summit in September 2021.

Sears was the master of ceremonies at the Defeat the Mandates rally in Washington D.C., on January 23, 2022, alongside Robert W. Malone, a skeptic of COVID-19 vaccine safety and mandates, and anti-vaccine activist Robert F. Kennedy Jr.

== Personal life ==
In September 2020, Sears announced that he and his wife were expecting a child. As of 2021, he resides on a property outside Austin, Texas.

In 2021, Sears stated, "Spirituality is super-important to me." He has not been vaccinated against COVID-19, saying, "I don't feel that I'm at risk due to my age. To be quite frank, this is the most rushed vaccine in medical history."
