= The Six Pack =

American radio talk show and podcast

- Country of origin: United States
- Language: English
- Hosted by: Dave Rubin; Ben Harvey
- Original release: 2009 – 2012

The Six Pack was a radio talk show and podcast that aired on Sirius XM Radio from 2009 to 2012. The show was hosted by Dave Rubin and Ben Harvey. Beginning in May 2009, The Six Pack went on to become the leading LGBT podcast on iTunes.

The show's segments included celebrity interviews, news, pop culture, and music. The duo was referred to as the "gay Lewis and Clark of the airwaves" by Modern Tonic, and their on-air rapport had been labeled a "mas macho" version of Ryan Seacrest and Simon Cowell from American Idol by Entertainment Weekly.

The Six Pack was both recorded and broadcast live at Sirius XM Radio in New York City.

After wrapping up a year on Sirius XM Radio, Dave Rubin went on to host his own talk show, The Rubin Report, on The Young Turks Network in Los Angeles, California.

== Episodes ==
Episode	Title	Guest	Release date
1	Hazy Recollections	Collection of highlights	May 29, 2009
2	Leprechauns on Acid	Levi Kreis	May 30, 2009
3	My Masturbating Neighbor	Davey Wavey	June 5, 2009
4	Gay Eskimos	Kelli O'Donnell	June 12, 2009
5	The Ookie Cookie	Gregory Michael	June 20, 2009
6	Almost Like Being a Porn Star	Marcellas Reynolds	July 4, 2009
7	Who's the Scatman?	Bryan Safi	July 11, 2009
8	Lesbian Podiatrists	Andy Cohen	July 16, 2009
9	Bad Boys	Thom Bierdz	July 26, 2009
10	Guys with iPhones	Bethenny Frankel	August 2, 2009
11	Cigars, Sports, and Scotch	Wayne Besen	August 10, 2009
12	This Much is True	Frank DeCaro	August 16, 2009
13	A Gift from God	Judge David Young	August 22, 2009
14	They're Playing My Song	LuAnn de Lesseps, Jill Zarin, Jack Mackenroth, Lisa Lampanelli	August 31, 2009
15	Tardy for the Party	Bryan Batt	September 14, 2009
16	Ya Know What I Mean?	Thomas Roberts	September 21, 2009
17	Pretentious (Gay) Tools	Chris Salvatore and Michael Walker	September 27, 2009
18	Growing Pains	Jenni Pulos	October 5, 2009
19	Kings of Wishful Thinking	Bob Smith	October 12, 2009
20	Dirty Sanchez	Scott Evans	October 18, 2009
21	Slug Pellets	Bruce Vilanch	October 18, 2009
22	Purification Rubdown	Ivri Lider	November 2, 2009
23	Good for the Gay Trees	Marc Shaiman	November 16, 2009
24	Annoying Drunk White Chicks	Dustin Lance Black, Lance Bass, Victor Garber, Judy Gold	November 25, 2009
25	We're On a Boat	Broadcast from cruise	December 7, 2009
26	A Very Ticklish Christmas	Mason Wyler	December 24, 2009
27	I Didn't Ask Him His Name	Collection of highlights	January 3, 2010
28	Masc Jock vs. Bossy Bottom	Nick Adams	January 10, 2010
29	Sherlock Homos	David Hauslaib	January 18, 2010
30	Debbie Does Dallas	Nicholas Rodriguez	January 24, 2010
31	Postmodern Mashup	Sandra Bernhard	February 3, 2010
32	Valentine's Day Germs	BT	February 14, 2010
33	Vitamin Wars	Jane Velez-Mitchell	February 22, 2010
34	Join the Joyride	Joy Behar	March 1, 2010
35	Latin Drag Queens	Hal Sparks	March 8, 2010
36	Gay Blue People	Sigourney Weaver, Michael Urie, Sandra Bernhard	March 17, 2010
37	Techno Fairy	Jackie Mason	March 29, 2010
38	Playing with Cheese	Kate Clinton	April 14, 2010
39	Move Over Ricky Martin	Reichen Lehmkuhl	April 27, 2010
40	Coming Out Wright	Chely Wright	May 8, 2010
41	Once Upon a Conch	Stanley Roots	May 17, 2010
42	I'm The Only One	Jarrett Barrios	May 31, 2010
43	Sword Slaying	Leslie Jordan	June 14, 2010
44	Trenton Makes, The World Takes	Soledad O'Brien	June 24, 2010
45	The Real Situation	Scott Herman	July 4, 2010
46	Path to Queendom	George Takei	July 17, 2010
47	Undercover Cassock	Paula Poundstone	July 27, 2010
48	Twinks and Jwinks	Brent Everett	August 3, 2010
49	Wait for the Book	Barney Frank	August 15, 2010
50	50 Gates of Wisdom	Margaret Cho	August 23, 2010
51	App for That	John Amaechi	September 9, 2010
52	Lettuce Tossing	Six Packin' Across America Tour – San Diego, California	September 20, 2010
53	San Francisco Babylon	Six Packin' Across America Tour – San Francisco, California	October 2, 2010
54	In a Sentimental Mood	Bettie Naylor, Six Packin' Across America Tour – Austin, Texas	October 17, 2010
55	Whip It Real Good	Steve-O	November 2, 2010
56	Tea Parties	Fran Drescher	November 18, 2010
57	Dreidel Dreidel	Whitney Mixter from The Real L Word	December 11, 2010
58	Merry Craigslist Christmas	Craigslist Missed Connections Set to Christmas Music	December 25, 2010
59	Return of the Murse	Judy Gold	January 1, 2011
60	Beverly Hills Houseguest	Cedric Martinez from The Real Housewives of Beverly Hills	January 24, 2011
61	High Concept Art	Mike Ruiz, Black Spark	January 31, 2011
62	Gaga Gone Gone	Michael Musto	February 22, 2011
63	Nature vs. Nurture	Dave Holmes	February 28, 2011
64	Old School Soda Makers	Melissa Rauch	March 17, 2011
65	Sex Changes and Track Lighting	Andy Dick	March 30, 2011
66	Take Yo Momma Out	Lisa Lampanelli	April 12, 2011
67	Yes to Everything	James Van Der Beek	April 26, 2011
68	Keeping Them Honest	Ben Cohen	May 11, 2011
69	It's All Coming Back	Thomas Roberta	May 26, 2011
70	Reem!	Hudson Taylor	June 15, 2011
71	Til Death Do Us Part	Joy Behar and Ed Koch	June 29, 2011
72	LesbiGod	Whitney Mixter from The Real L Word	July 14, 2011
73	Back Sweat Index	Mo Rocca	July 27, 2011
74	I'm Not a Superman	Daniel Choi	August 10, 2011
75	Pleasant Unconsciousness	Michael Ian Black	August 24, 2011
76	Space Vacation	Don Lemon	September 7, 2011
77	Rainbow Trout	Henry Winkler	September 21, 2011
78	French Lessons	Steve-O	October 5, 2011
79	Puerto Rican Poolboy	Frank Sweeney from The Real World: San Diego (2011)	October 19, 2011
80	Baby Shaker	Justin Utley	November 2, 2011
81	Bienvenidos a Miami	Six Packin' Across America Tour – Miami	November 16, 2011
82	Moving Merchandise	High Pitch Mike from The Howard Stern Show	November 30, 2011
83	A Reality, Reality World	Brad Goreski of It's a Brad, Brad World	December 14, 2011
84	The Underdog	Andy Cohen	December 28, 2011
85	Pikachu Tattoo	Ed Begley, Jr.	January 4, 2012
86	¡Es Justin Bieber!	Six Packin' Across The Globe Tour – Isla Mujeres	January 18, 2012
87	Life is a Highway	Six Packin Across America Tour – Detroit	January 25, 2012
88	Live and Let Live	Wendy Liebman	February 8, 2012
89	Google Romney	Mo Rocca	February 22, 2012
90	Show Me That Smile Again	Melissa Rauch	March 7, 2012
91	Without Horns	Christopher Ciccone	March 21, 2012
92	The SHTF Episode	Don Lemon	April 4, 2012
93	SoLoMo	Richard Lewis	April 18, 2012
94	Lenny and Squiggy	Jessica St. Clair and Lennon Parham	May 2, 2012
95	Pulling a Biden	Carnie Wilson and Lizz Winstead	May 16, 2012
96	Summer of the tank Top	Mike Manning, Alan Thicke	May 30, 2012
Six Pack Short	Short: Jackée Harry	Jackée Harry	June 6, 2012
97	I Wanna Feel Bad	John Fugelsang	June 13, 2012
98	The Budding Grapes	Chris Crocker	June 28, 2012
99	The Secret About Gays and Straights	Steve Guttenberg	July 11, 2012
100	Just the Beginning	Lance Bass	July 25, 2012
101	Three Little Elves	Karl Frisch	August 8, 2012
102	Top Down	Jack Moore from BuzzFeed	August 22, 2012
103	Back To School	Jessica Kirson	September 5, 2012
104	Full Disclosure	Dave Holmes	September 19, 2012
105	Shirtless Curtain Pullers	Frenchie Davis	October 3, 2012
106	Papaya, Mango and Lime	Abby Huntsman	October 24, 2012
Six Pack Short	Short: Larry King	Larry King	October 31, 2012
Six Pack Short	Short: Mayim Bialik	Mayim Bialik	November 14, 2012
109	Penultimate Episode	Rosie O'Donnell	December 19, 2012
