= Benny Johnson (columnist) =

American conservative commentator (born 1987)

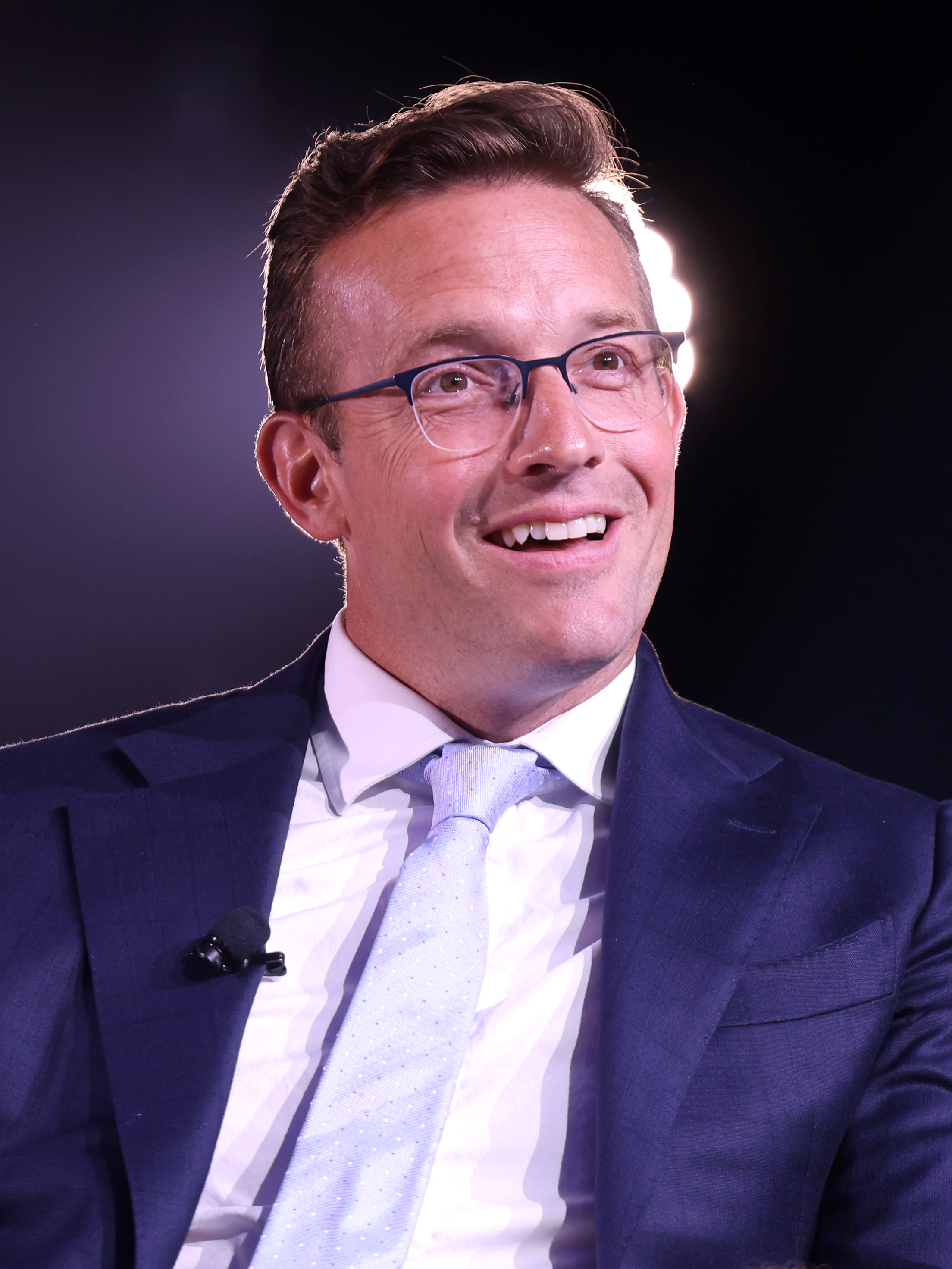
- Johnson in 2026
- Born: May 27, 1987 (age 39); Cedar Rapids, Iowa, U.S.
- Education: University of Iowa (BA)
- Spouse: Katelyn Rieley
- Children: 4

YouTube information
- Channel: Benny Johnson
- Years active: 2020–present
- Genres: Political commentary; Conservative journalism
- Subscribers: 6.1 million
- Views: 4.3 billion
- Last updated: 26 January 2026

Benny Johnson (born May 27, 1987) is an American right-wing political commentator and YouTuber. He has contributed to several conservative media outlets such as Breitbart News, TheBlaze, National Review, and The Daily Caller. Johnson was previously employed with BuzzFeed but was fired in 2014 due to several instances of plagiarism. Johnson has also worked for Turning Point USA and hosted for Newsmax TV.

== Career ==
After attending the University of Iowa, Johnson began contributing opinion pieces to the website Breitbart in 2010. From 2011 to 2012, Johnson was a full-time employee for conservative website TheBlaze, founded by Glenn Beck.

Johnson has faced recurring accusations of plagiarism. From 2012 to 2014, Johnson was a staff writer at BuzzFeed, until he was suspended from BuzzFeed when an online investigation exposed plagiarism in his posts. His writings "periodically lifted text from a variety of sources", including Yahoo Answers, Wikipedia, and U.S. News & World Report, "all without credit". The plagiarized work comprised almost 10 percent of his work; he was subsequently fired from BuzzFeed and apologized for the plagiarism.

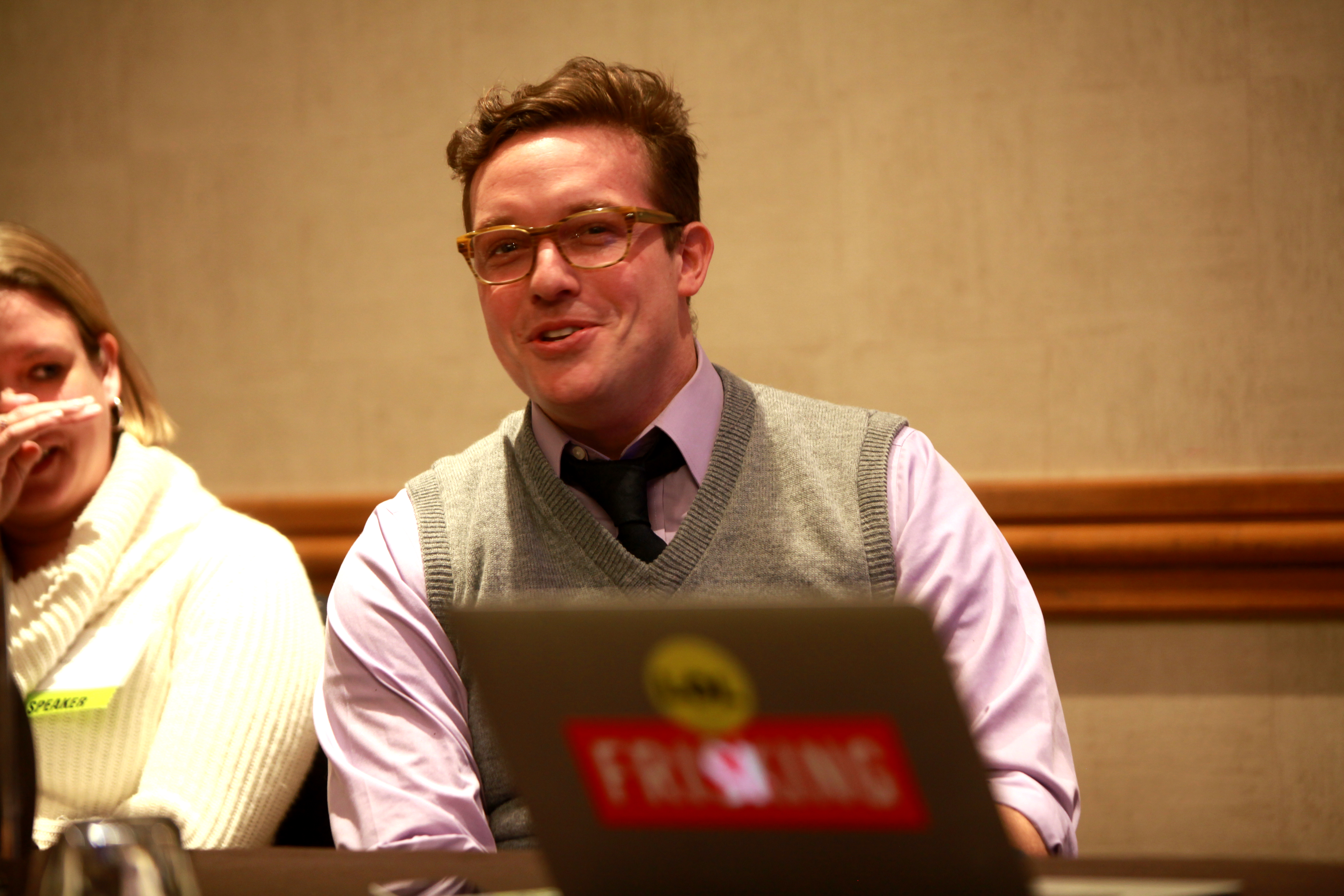
Johnson speaking at the 2014 International Students for Liberty Conference in Washington, D.C.

In September 2014, Johnson became digital director at National Review (NR). In 2015, Johnson left NR to join the Independent Journal Review (IJR) as a creative content contributor. In March 2017, IJR staffers accused Johnson of plagiarizing an article about then-House Republican Conference chairwoman Cathy McMorris Rodgers. Later in the same month Johnson was suspended by the IJR after his involvement in an article which asserted that judge Derrick Watson's partial blocking of Executive Order 13780 was connected to former president Barack Obama's visit to Hawaii. Johnson had been warned that the IJR could potentially be promoting a conspiracy theory, but assigned the story anyway. During this time he wrote an article containing the most controversial tweets of what he thought was the Boston antifa Twitter account, but it was actually a fake account intended to lampoon antifa. Initially an editorial note was added, and the article was later removed. A month after his relationship with the IJR was terminated in October 2017, Johnson joined The Daily Caller.

In 2019, he became a chief creative officer at Turning Point USA. In 2020, Johnson was a host on Newsmax TV.

In April 2022, The Verge published an investigation on Arsenal Media, a conservative boutique co-founded by Johnson. Former employees and contractors described dubious corporate practices, including payments delayed for months, contracts with political campaigns rife with self-dealing, and overworked and underpaid jobs. Johnson has been described as "very abusive, very toxic, screaming at people, like using profanity, vulgarity, making women cry, like pushing them to the edge".

In August 2024, two Russian state media employees were charged with secretly funding almost $10 million to a Tennessee company for the production of political videos to benefit Russia by influencing the United States. The company's description matches that of Tenet Media, which had employed Johnson and other right-wing influencers, with him responding that "myself and other influencers were victims in this alleged scheme", with a request being made for him to produce content for a "media startup", and that he had a "standard, arms length deal, which was later terminated".

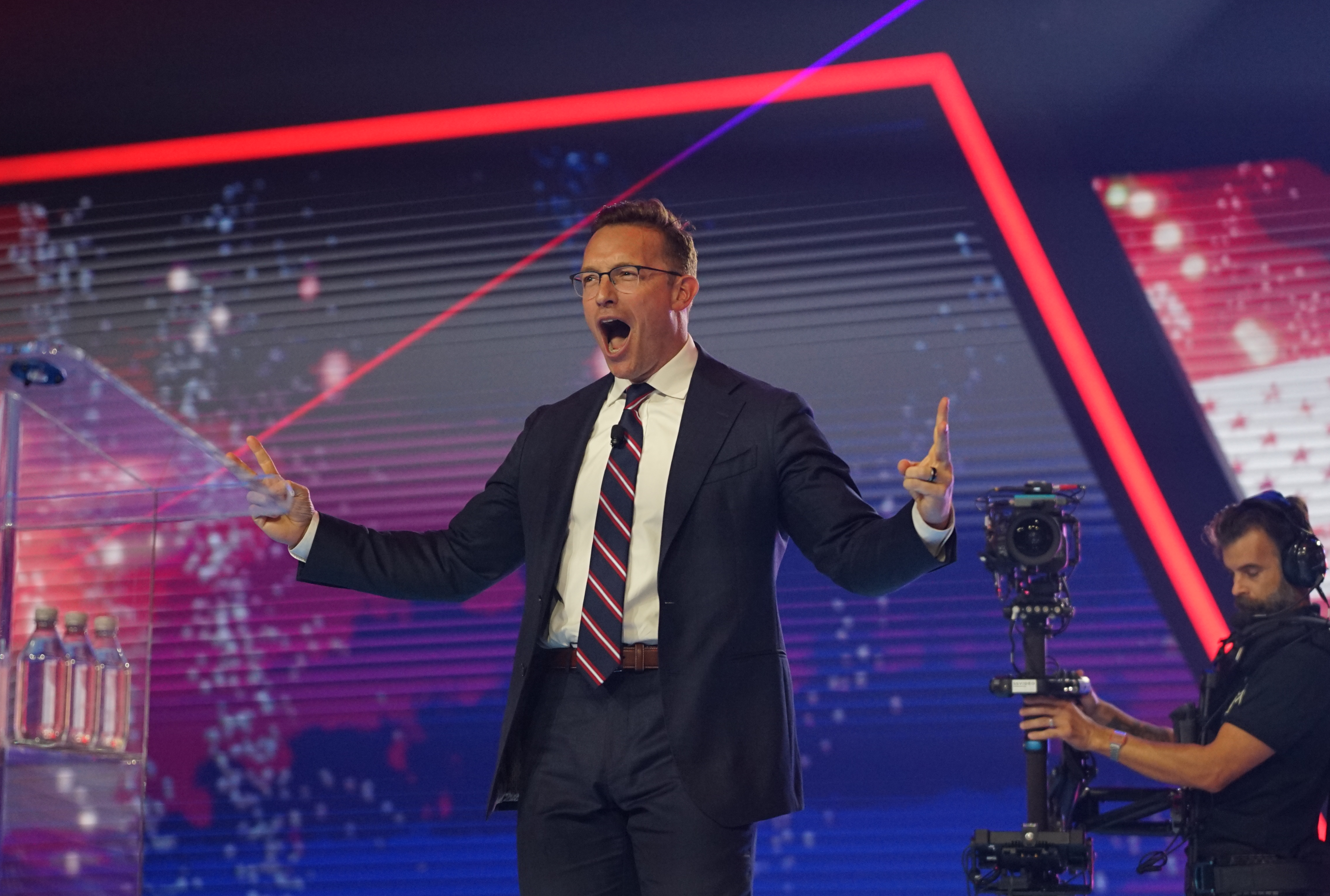
Johnson at AmericaFest 2025

In August 2025, Johnson responded to a Truth Social post by President Donald Trump claiming that Washington, D.C., was overrun with crime by tweeting a video with the caption: "Here's a mass shooting and murder in my front lawn, followed by my house being set on fire with my wife and infant child inside." The claim was later proven false; a subsequent profile in The New York Times, citing police reports and fire department reports, found that no murders had occurred for years in that area and the fire had in fact occurred at a neighbor's residence. Johnson had sensationalized details of the episode and falsely presented it as having taken place at his own home.

Following the 2025 Brown University shooting, during which Ella Cook, a College Republicans activist, was killed, Johnson claimed without evidence that Cook was targeted because of her political views. Johnson further shared misinformation falsely identifying a Palestinian Brown University student as the killer, a theory which was disproven when a different individual, Claudio Neves Valente, was identified as the shooter.

In February 2026, Johnson caused further controversy by posting a photo on social media of Hillary Clinton during her testimony, which representative Lauren Boebert leaked to him. Boebert's leak of the photo was acknowledged to have violated ethics protocol rules set up by the House Oversight and Government Reform Committee, with a chance of such leaked content being potentially edited with the intent of creating political theatrics. As a result, Clinton's testimony was briefly put on hold.

Johnson runs three YouTube channels: "Benny Johnson", "Benny On The Block" and "Benny Brews". Johnson also hosts a podcast called The Benny Show. His main YouTube channel, titled "Benny Johnson", has amassed 6.01 million subscribers and 4 billion views as of September 2025.

== Personal life ==
Johnson is married to Katelyn Rieley, with whom he has four children as of 2025.

On October 10, 2025, Attorney General Pam Bondi hosted a press conference featuring Johnson and attended by his wife Katelyn, spotlighting the arrest of a man who sent a letter to Johnson's home threatening his life. The arrested individual described in the letter that he hoped for Johnson's "extermination" and that Johnson should be "strangled with an American flag", among other details. Johnson used the press conference to argue that violence, including assassination, has been mainstreamed by the Democratic Party.
