= Dave Rubin =

American political commentator (born 1976)

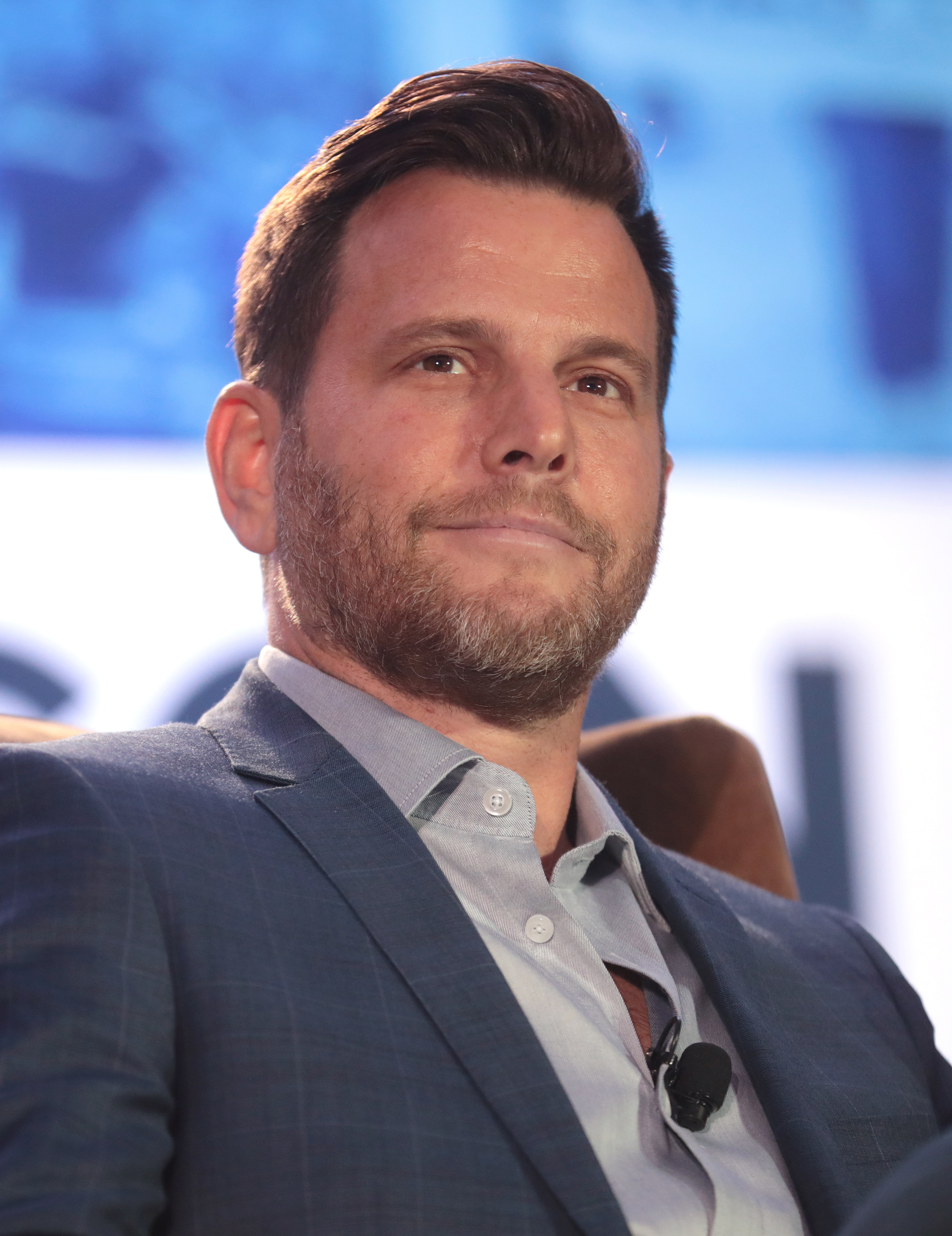
- Rubin in 2019
- Born: David Joshua Rubin; June 26, 1976 (age 50); New York City, U.S.
- Education: Binghamton University (BA)
- Occupations: Political commentator; host; media personality; YouTuber; author
- Years active: 1998–present
- Known for: The Rubin Report
- Political party: Democratic (until 2017); Independent (2017–2022); Republican (since 2022)
- Spouse: David Janet (m. 2015)
- Children: 2

YouTube information
- Channel: The Rubin Report
- Years active: 2012–present
- Subscribers: 3.24 million
- Views: 2.749 billion
- Last updated: November 12, 2026

David Joshua Rubin (born June 26, 1976) is an American conservative political commentator, talk show host, YouTuber, and author. He is the host of The Rubin Report, a talk show on YouTube and the BlazeTV network. The program was first launched in 2013 as part of the TYT Network; Rubin left in 2015, citing ideological differences. He previously co-hosted LGBTQ-themed talk shows, including The Ben and Dave Show (2007–2008) and The Six Pack (2009–2012), both with Ben Harvey.

Rubin originally aligned with progressive politics during his time at The Young Turks. He has written that his views began to shift after observing public debates involving figures such as Cenk Uygur, Ben Affleck, Bill Maher, and Sam Harris, as well as responses to the Charlie Hebdo shooting. He later described himself as a classical liberal, and in the 2020s as a conservative and libertarian. He has been a frequent critic of progressivism and the Democratic Party.

== Early life ==
Rubin was born on June 26, 1976, in Brooklyn, New York City. He grew up in a "fairly secular Jewish household on Long Island". He spent his adolescence in Syosset, New York, and then he resided on the Upper West Side of Manhattan for thirteen years. He attended Binghamton University, where he graduated with a bachelor's degree in political science in 1998. In 1997, he spent a semester at Ben-Gurion University of the Negev in Beersheba, Israel.

== Career ==
=== Comedy ===
In 1998, Rubin started his career in comedy doing stand-up and attending open-mics in New York City. In 1999, he became an intern at The Daily Show with Jon Stewart. In 2000, Rubin continued his career at the New York City–based Comedy Cellar. Later that year he joined with other Comedy Cellar comedians to create a public-access television series, a news program parody called The Anti-Show which was secretly filmed at NBC Studios in 30 Rockefeller Plaza. In 2002, he co-founded several New York City–based comedy clubs, including Joe Franklin's Comedy Club and The Comedy Company in Times Square, where he continued to do stand-up until 2007.

Rubin was the host of two podcasts, Hot Gay Comics and The Ben and Dave Show, which were turned into a television series on the here! television network. In May 2009, Rubin co-created and co-hosted the podcast The Six Pack. From October 2011 to December 2012, The Six Pack was on Sirius XM Radio as a live talk show. As of 2024, Rubin also stars in The New Norm as Chaz, a non-binary influencer who moves in with the title character as a form of parole to re-educate him.

=== Political commentary ===
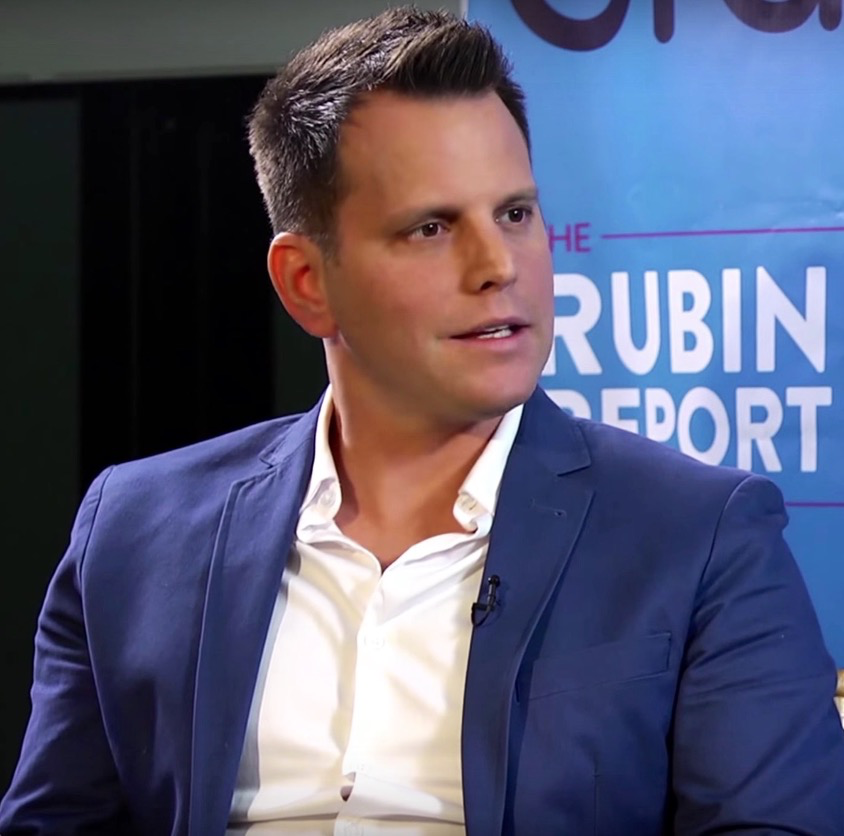
Rubin during a taping of The Rubin Report at Politicon in 2015

While a part of Sirius XM, Rubin created his own account on YouTube called "Rubin Report" in early September 2012. In January 2013, Rubin joined The Young Turks, where he hosted the show The Rubin Report. He moved from New York City to Los Angeles, California. On March 1, 2015, The Young Turks YouTube channel announced that Rubin would be moving to the media company RYOT. Shortly after, Larry King's Ora TV picked up the show which debuted on September 9, 2015. He left Ora TV in 2016, opting to run The Rubin Report independently. The Rubin Report had an affiliation with the libertarian Institute for Humane Studies, a Koch family foundations–funded organization which sponsored a few of his episodes in the past.

Rubin frequently appears as a speaker at events hosted by Turning Point USA, a conservative student organization. Rubin has been a podcast guest on The Joe Rogan Experience, Coffee with Scott Adams, and The Ben Shapiro Show. In 2017, he starred in a video by the conservative media company PragerU titled "Why I Left the Left". Rubin's book Don't Burn This Book: Thinking for Yourself in an Age of Unreason was published in April 2020 by Sentinel. It made The New York Times Best Seller list, but was critically panned. In December 2021, Rubin sold his Los Angeles house and announced that he was moving to Miami, Florida. In his announcement, he criticized California Governor Gavin Newsom as an "unbearable tyrant who dared to extend his emergency powers and then immediately take a $200,000 vacation." He also cited "high crime", "high taxes", "vaccine passports and mask conformity" as reasons for his decisions to move from California.

=== The Rubin Report ===
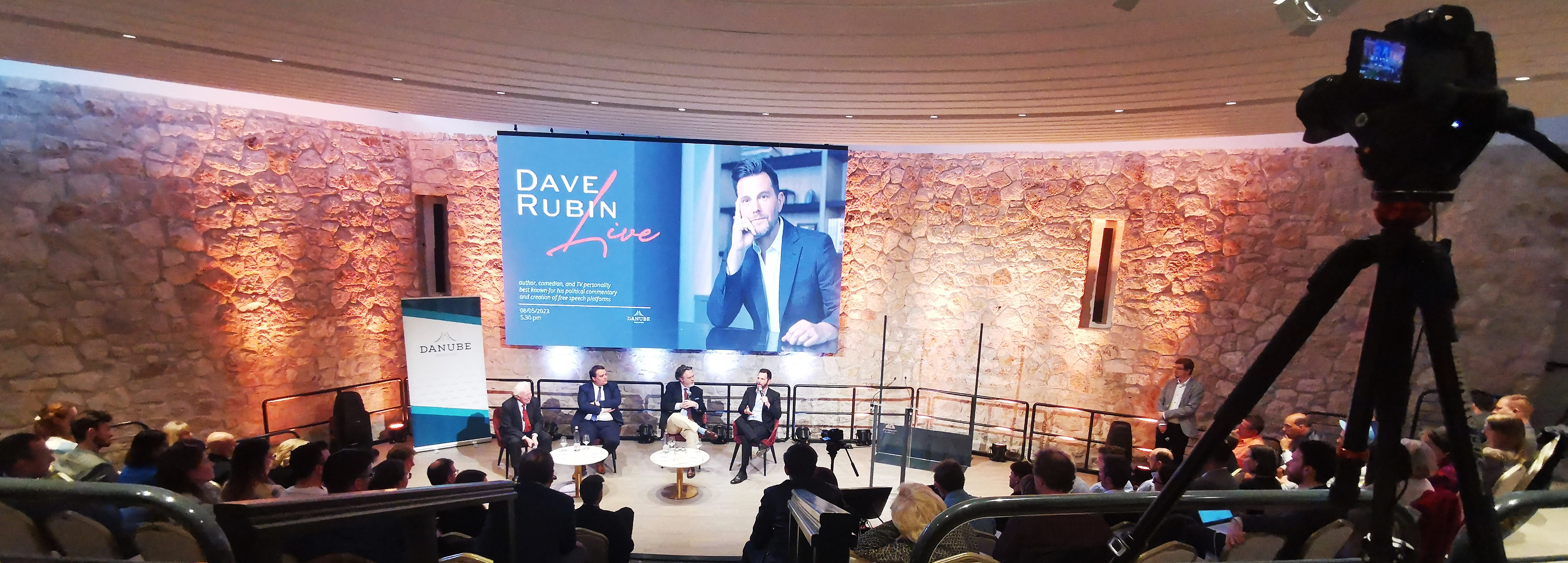
Rubin live at the Danube Institute

In 2015, Rubin launched The Rubin Report. On his show, Rubin interviews and speaks with journalists, activists, authors, comedians, and professors. Topics discussed on his show include freedom of speech, political correctness, foreign policy, and religion. Guests on his show have included Sam Harris, Ben Shapiro, Larry Elder, Steven Crowder, Ayaan Hirsi Ali, Douglas Murray, John McCain, and others. Rubin has also hosted more controversial figures on his show, including Lauren Southern, Mike Cernovich, and Milo Yiannopoulos.

Until late 2018, Rubin's show received much of its funding through Patreon, a crowdfunding site on which Rubin said he received over $10,000 per month before deletion. Rubin and Jordan Peterson announced their intent to leave the platform following Sargon of Akkad's ban, which they described as an assault on free speech. In a video shortly thereafter, the two announced their interest in developing an independent, free speech-oriented crowdfunding site. Peterson started Thinkspot, and Rubin co-created locals.com. By May 2019, The Rubin Report YouTube channel had 200 million views. In 2019, The Rubin Report became available on BlazeTV, a conservative subscription video service run by Glenn Beck.

A 2018 report from Data & Society described Rubin as part of a network on YouTube that amplified far-right politics. The report cited as an example an interview that Rubin conducted with Stefan Molyneux in which Rubin asked Molyneux to elaborate on his views that races have different average IQ test results and that these differences are genetic. The report held that Rubin did not challenge Molyneux in any substantial way, concluding, "By letting him speak without providing a legitimate and robust counterargument, Rubin provides a free platform for white supremacist ideology on his channel." In response to the report, Rubin tweeted, "wanna explain to me how gay married, pro choice, pro-pot, against death penalty, for reforming prisons/drug sentencing, is part of reactionary right?" and "(As you and rest of mainstream slide into irrelevancy you did get the 'underestimated forces' part right, though.)"

== Political views ==
=== Political ideology ===
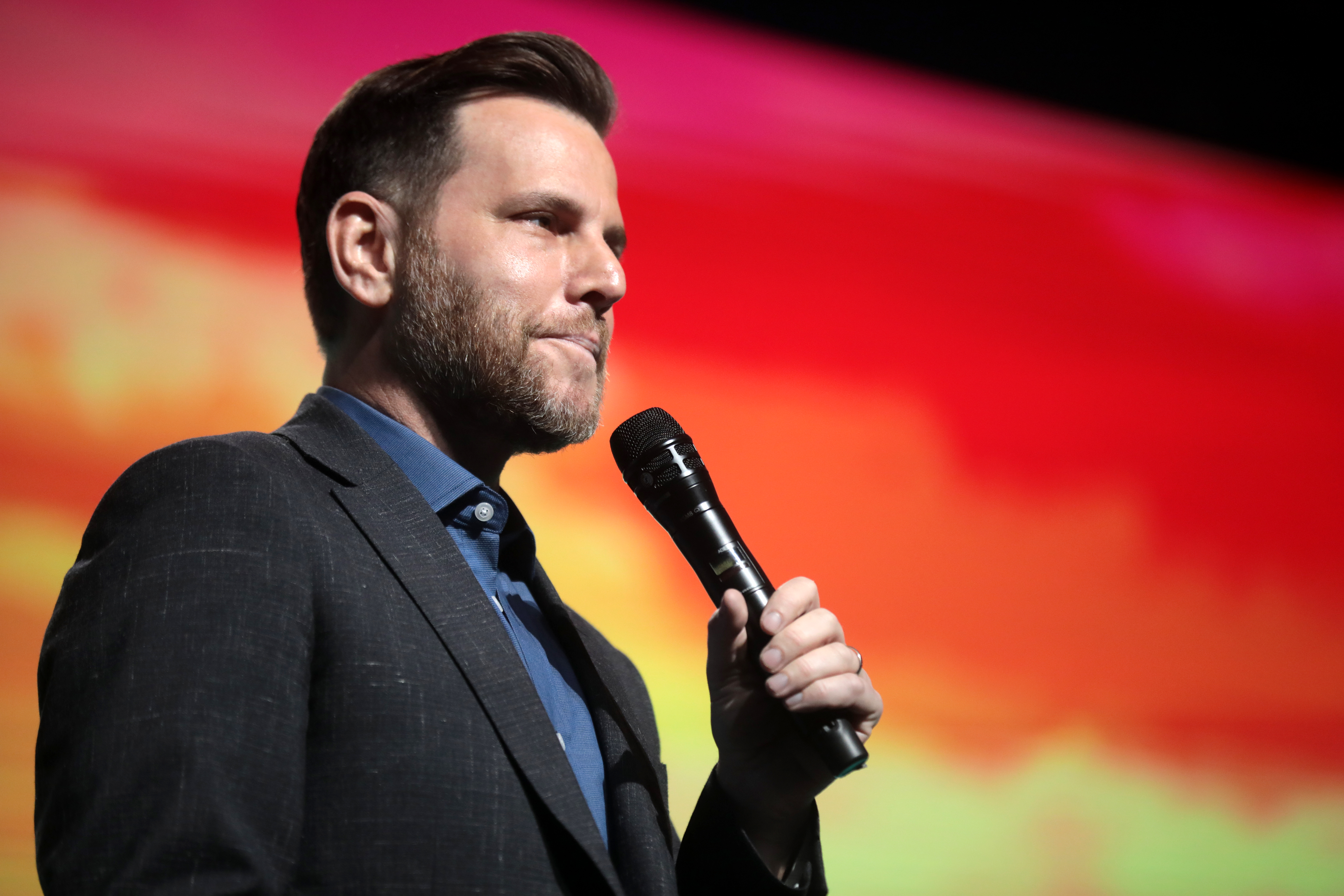
Rubin at the 2019 Student Action Summit hosted by Turning Point USA

Rubin used to be a progressive but distanced himself from that movement after several incidents, such as a disagreement with his The Young Turks colleague Cenk Uygur, and watching a disagreement between Sam Harris and Ben Affleck on the TV show Real Time with Bill Maher. Rubin has also said he disliked the left's response to the Charlie Hebdo shooting for what he saw as rationalization for the attack by criticizing the magazine for publishing images depicting Muhammad while failing to defend their right to free speech.

Rubin then described himself as a classical liberal due to holding more conservative and libertarian views than most modern liberals. In December 2021, Rubin wrote an article for Newsweek where he argues that classical liberals and libertarians should vote for the Republican Party. In a 2017 interview with Reason, Rubin stated that he originally characterized himself as on the progressive left but stopped in response to the so-called "Oppression Olympics" and what he regarded as the left's rejection of freedom of speech. Rubin has since described himself as a conservative, stating in 2021: "For me to tell you that I'm not a conservative at this point doesn't really make sense." While Rubin has expressed support for several liberal views such as same-sex marriage, criminal justice reform, and marijuana legalization, he has characterized progressivism as a mental disorder.

=== Candidates and elections ===
Rubin voted for Barack Obama in the 2008 United States presidential election and 2012 United States presidential election. Rubin also voted for Bill Clinton in the 1990s. Ahead of the 2016 United States Presidential election, Rubin declined to endorse Hillary Clinton or Donald Trump and instead voted for Libertarian Party candidate Gary Johnson. In an interview with Glenn Beck, he retrospectively stated that he chose not to vote for Trump as he was uncertain about how Trump would govern the United States. In July 2017, Rubin criticized Trump's use of executive orders when asked about Trump policies with which he disagreed. In October 2020, Rubin said he had "been a lifelong Democrat" but would be voting for a Republican president for the first time and endorsed Trump for a second term in the 2020 United States presidential election. Rubin subsequently elaborated that while he did not agree with everything Trump had done, he had changed his mind on the president and would vote for Trump on the basis of his opposition to the "woke left" and critical race theory in American institutions. In 2023, Rubin endorsed Ron DeSantis' bid in the 2024 Republican Party presidential primaries.

=== Gender and sexuality ===
Rubin is gay and supports same-sex marriage, being in one himself. He has said he would not take legal action against a Christian baker if one refused to make a wedding cake for his wedding, as in the Masterpiece Cakeshop v. Colorado Civil Rights Commission case. Rubin also said that it would be equally wrong to force a Jewish painter "to take commissions of Hitler imagery from a Nazi sympathizer". In 2022, Rubin spoke out against rainbow logos for Pride Month. In a 2019 interview with Sky News, he stated, "Whether you're gay or straight or black or white or female or trans, those things are actually completely irrelevant other than your thoughts; your thoughts and actions are what matters." His Twitter account was suspended in 2022 after he retweeted a tweet in which Jordan Peterson misgendered actor Elliot Page. Rubin was defended by conservatives Douglas Murray and John Cardillo who criticized the suspension. On one occasion on his show, Rubin said, "If I found out a teacher talked to my 6-year-old about gender or sexuality, I might kill that person."

=== Law enforcement ===
In 2022, Rubin criticized Democratic politicians for supporting the defund the police movement and accused them of "demonizing" law enforcement. Rubin supported an effort to fire Los Angeles district attorney George Gascón. Rubin supports criminal justice reform and reforming drug sentencing, and opposes the death penalty.

=== Israel ===
Rubin is a supporter of Israel. While still part of the progressive Young Turks network, Rubin believed that the network "whitewashed crucial details" about the conduct of Hamas during the 2014 Gaza War. In an interview with The Jerusalem Post, Rubin stated, "The future of the [Democratic Party] seems to be this radical socialist base that believes for one group to succeed, another has to fail", and went on to state that this is why progressive Democrats like Ilhan Omar, Rashida Tlaib, and Linda Sarsour (whom he thinks are "true antisemites") have an anti-Israel and anti-Jewish view. Rubin stated in an interview with Alan Mendoza on J-TV, "First off, this idea ... that anti-Zionism somehow is not antisemitism is crazy." Rubin went on to say that there are many Christian- and Muslim-majority countries and that "there's one tiny Jewish country again with ... seven million people or so, twenty percent of whom ... are Arab and have ... the exact same rights as the Israelis. Not to say there aren't some problems in Israel. Of course, there are. But ... it is by far the most tolerant society in the entire Middle East."

=== Intellectual dark web ===
Rubin is a member of the intellectual dark web, an informal group which speaks out against political correctness, cancel culture, and identity politics. Other members of the group include Eric Weinstein, Jordan Peterson and Ben Shapiro. In 2021, Rubin described a growing ideological split among the early intellectual dark web, saying of Bari Weiss, Sam Harris, and Bret Weinstein:

They've made what to me seems to be a very obvious fatal mistake, that you can use any of the tools of Liberalism — of open inquiry, freedom of speech, respect for your fellow human beings, individual rights — that you can use any of these things to rationalise with the monster that is coming to burn your house down. And that's why we've seen in effect the liberals have no defence over this, which is why all the liberal institutions are crumbling.

== Tenet Media investigation ==
In September 2024, two Russian state media employees were charged with secretly funding almost $10 million to a Tennessee company for the production of political videos to benefit Russia by influencing the United States. The company's description matches that of Tenet Media, which had employed Rubin and other right-wing influencers. Rubin matches the indictment's description of "Commentator-1", who it alleges agreed to produce "four weekly videos that he would host and would be livestreamed by Tenet Media in exchange for $400,000 per month and a $100,000 signing bonus". In his response to the indictment on Twitter, Rubin stated that he was unaware of the company's connections to Russian funding and declared himself a victim of the alleged scheme. "The company never disclosed to the influencers – or to their millions of followers – its ties to [Russian state media company] RT and the Russian government," US attorney general Merrick Garland said.

== Personal life ==
Rubin publicly came out as gay in 2006, which he has referred to as his "defining moment". In December 2014, he became engaged to producer David Janet. The couple married on August 27, 2015. On March 16, 2022, Rubin and Janet announced that they were expecting two babies by surrogates. The first, a son named Justin Jordan, was born in August. Their second son Luke, was born in October. He once described himself as an agnostic, or an atheist, but he said that he was no longer an atheist in December 2019. In 2021, Rubin announced his intention to relocate from Los Angeles to Florida and moved to the greater Miami area.

== Bibliography ==
- Don't Burn This Book: Thinking for Yourself in an Age of Unreason (2020). McClelland & Stewart. ISBN 978-0-77107349-6.
- Don't Burn This Country: Surviving and Thriving in Our Woke Dystopia (2022). Sentinel. ISBN 978-0-59333214-6.
