= Consulier GTP =

American sports car by Consulier Industries

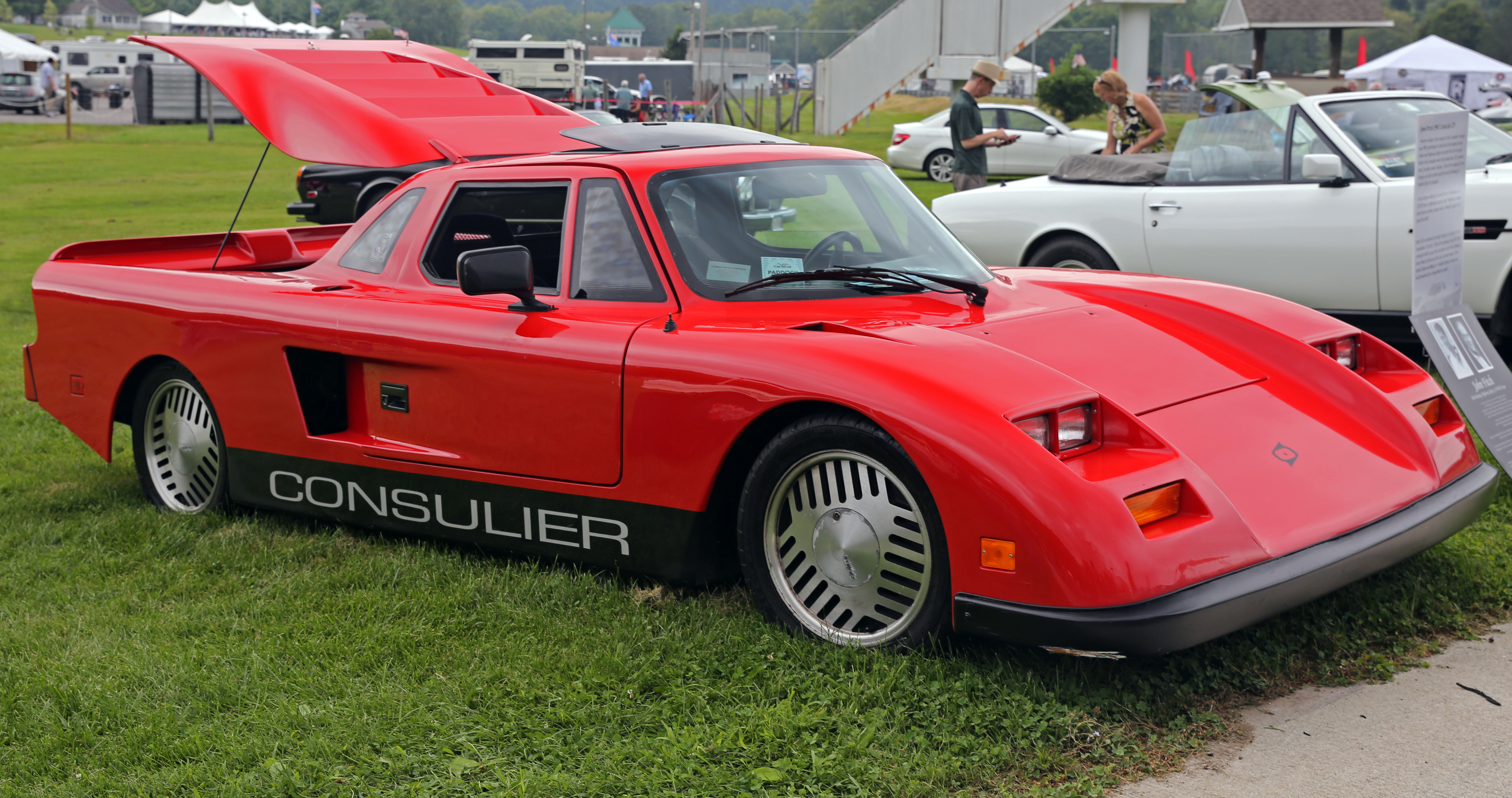

Overview
- Manufacturer: Consulier Industries; Mosler Automotive
- Production: 1988–1993 (Consulier GTP); 1993–2000 (Mosler Intruder/Raptor)
- Assembly: Riviera Beach, Florida
- Designer: Warren Mosler

Body and chassis
- Class: Sports car
- Body style: 2-door coupé; 2-door targa
- Layout: Rear mid-engine, rear-wheel-drive

Powertrain
- Engine: 2.2 L Turbo II & Turbo III I4; 5.7 L LT1 V8; 6.3 L small-block V8

Dimensions
- Wheelbase: 2,540 mm (100 in)
- Length: 4,369 mm (172 in)
- Width: 1,829 mm (72 in)
- Height: 1,130 mm (44.5 in)
- Curb weight: 998 kg (2,200 lb) (GTP); 1,258 kg (2,773 lb) (Raptor)

Chronology
- Successor: Mosler MT900

The Consulier GTP is an American sports car that was produced by Consulier Industries between 1988 and 1993 and successfully used in professional racing. Consulier Industries spun off their automotive division into Mosler Automotive which then rebranded the car as the Mosler Intruder and Mosler Raptor before production ended in 2000. Mosler replaced the car with the Mosler MT900 in 2001.

== History ==
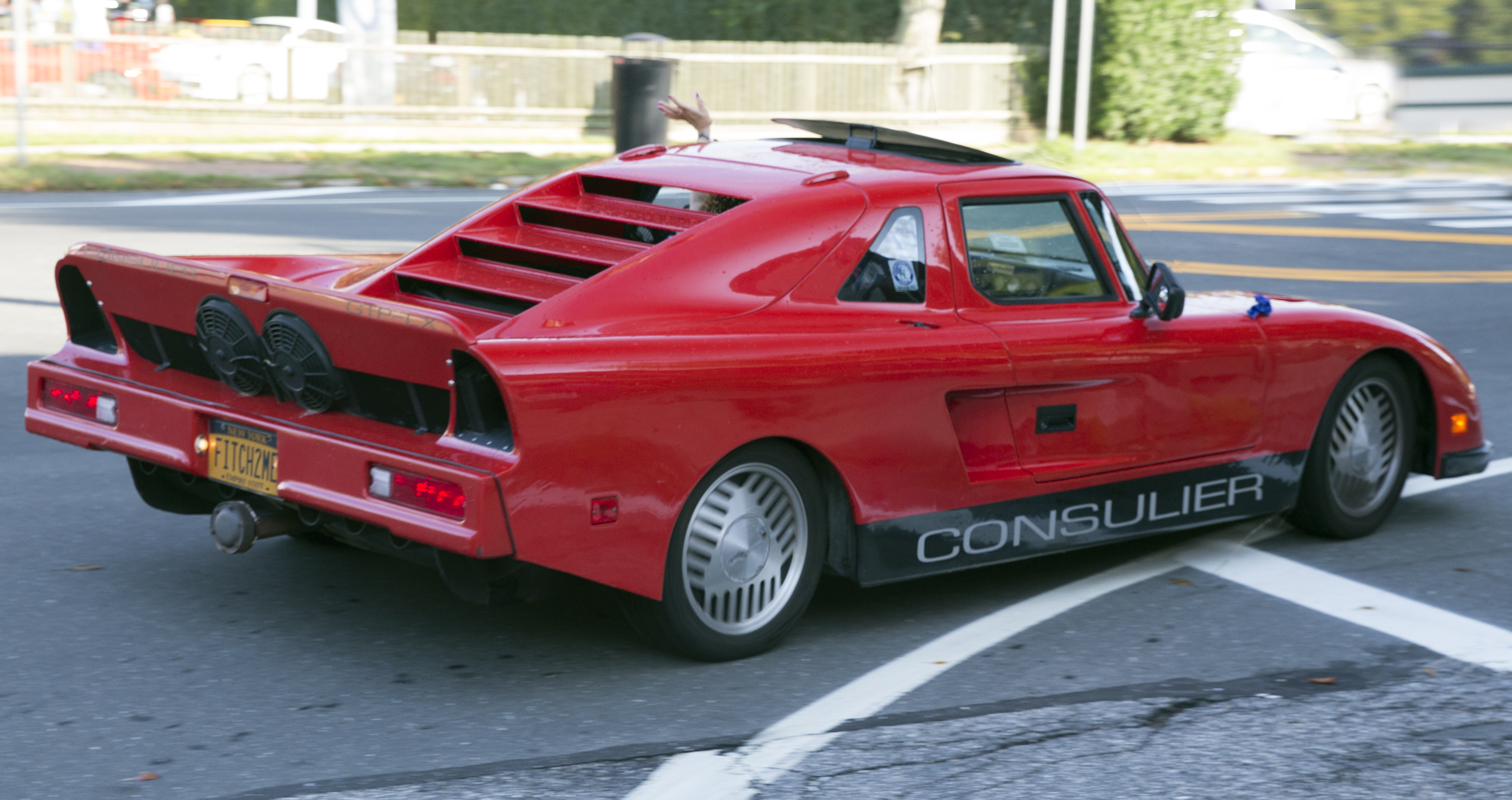
A Consulier GTP-LX prototype

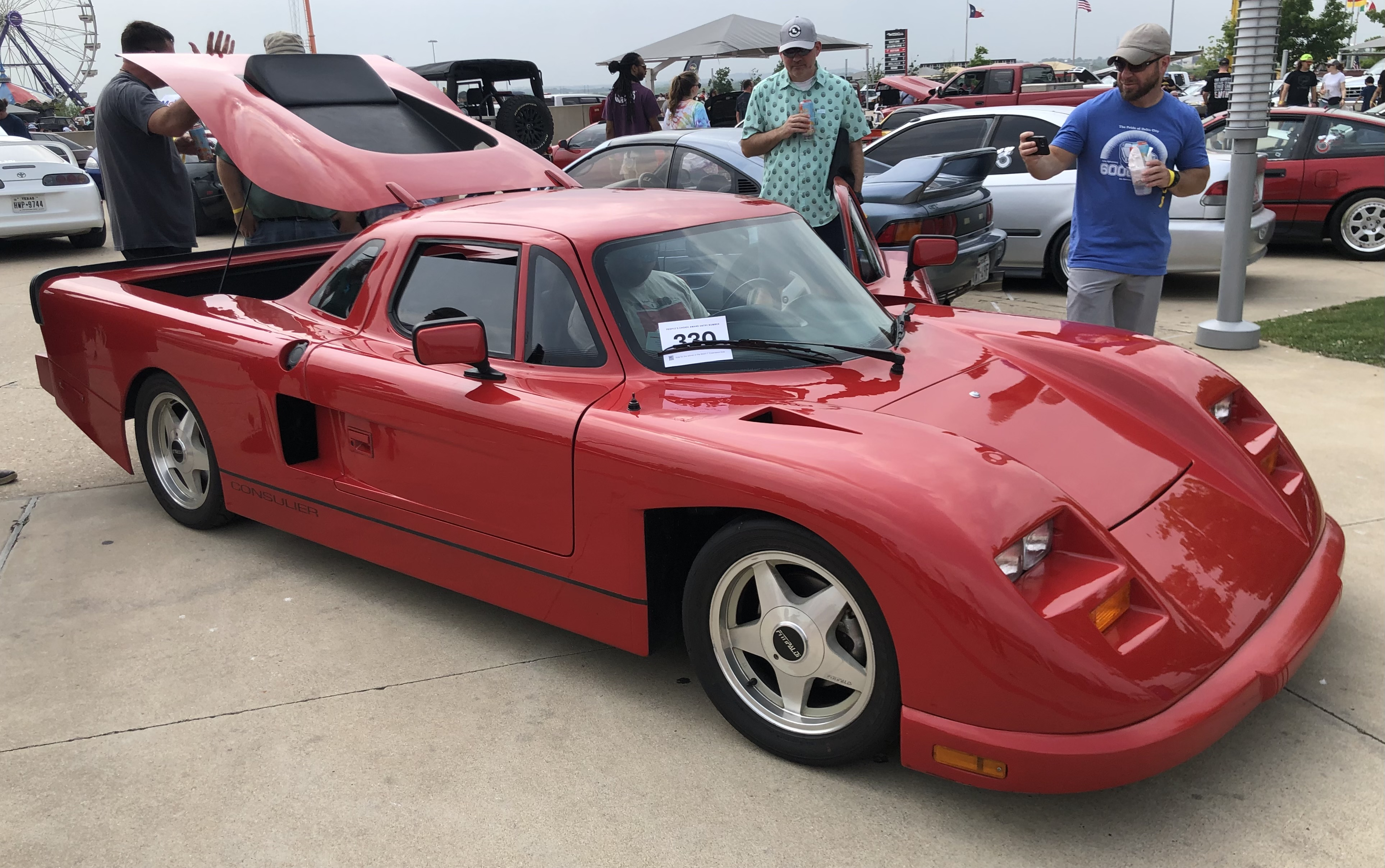
Consulier GTP Series II

The Consulier GTP, conceived by Warren Mosler in 1985, was a 2,200 pounds (1,000 kg) mid-engined sports car built in two series. The first series sold about 70 copies and was powered by a Chrysler 2.2 I4 Turbo II engine producing 175 hp (130 kW). The second series made use of the improved Turbo III version of the same engine, which produced 190 hp (140 kW) and had a top speed of 155 mph (249 km/h). Most mechanical components were also sourced from Chrysler. The chassis was a unique fiberglass-and-foam monocoque, the first carbon fiber and Kevlar-bodied vehicle ever to go into production with no structural metal in the body. The GTP Sport was the base model, with the GTP LX adding luxury features such as Recaro seats, VDO instrumentation, Fittipaldi wheels, Alpine sound system, sunroof, leather upholstery, air conditioning, cruise control, power locks, power mirrors, power windows, tilt steering wheel, and wool carpet; options included a security system and car phone. Both versions had full instrumentation, in a plain flat-black panel, with eleven gauges in two sizes.

The GTP was successful in IMSA racing for six years. Its excellent power to weight ratio, responsible for its success, effectively made the car unbeatable; the car was eventually saddled by IMSA with a 300-pound weight penalty before being banned entirely in 1991.

Somewhere between 60 and 100 Consulier GTPs were built. After Consulier Industries spun off into Mosler Automotive, a few of the cars were produced as hybrids between the GTP, Intruder, and Raptor. Some were modified to accept longitudinal Chevrolet small-block V8 engines, which would eventually be used in the Intruder and Raptor. Two separate companies also modified the GTP and installed electric drive components; one of these, a company named Solar Electric, advertised their version in print ads featuring Leslie Nielsen and sold the vehicles through Neiman Marcus. Another, Energy Partners, converted the car to utilize a fuel cell to power an electric motor that drove the wheels, with large hydrogen tanks sitting on the back like a pickup truck bed.

== Rebrand ==
=== Mosler Intruder ===
In 1993, Consulier Industries spun off their automotive division into Mosler Automotive, which focused on high-performance cars. Mosler introduced the Intruder, an updated GTP with a new 300 hp (220 kW) Corvette LT1 V8 engine modified by Lingenfelter. This car raced at the Longest Day of Nelson 24-hour race in 1993 and 1994, winning both years; like the GTP before it the Intruder was also banned from Nelson Ledges after its dominating 1993–1994 performances. In 1996, a 450 hp (340 kW) Lingenfelter Intruder won Car and Driver magazine's One Lap of America.

Of the four Intruders built, just one was sold. Another was converted into a GT1 racing car, while the remaining pair were converted into Raptors.

=== Mosler Raptor ===
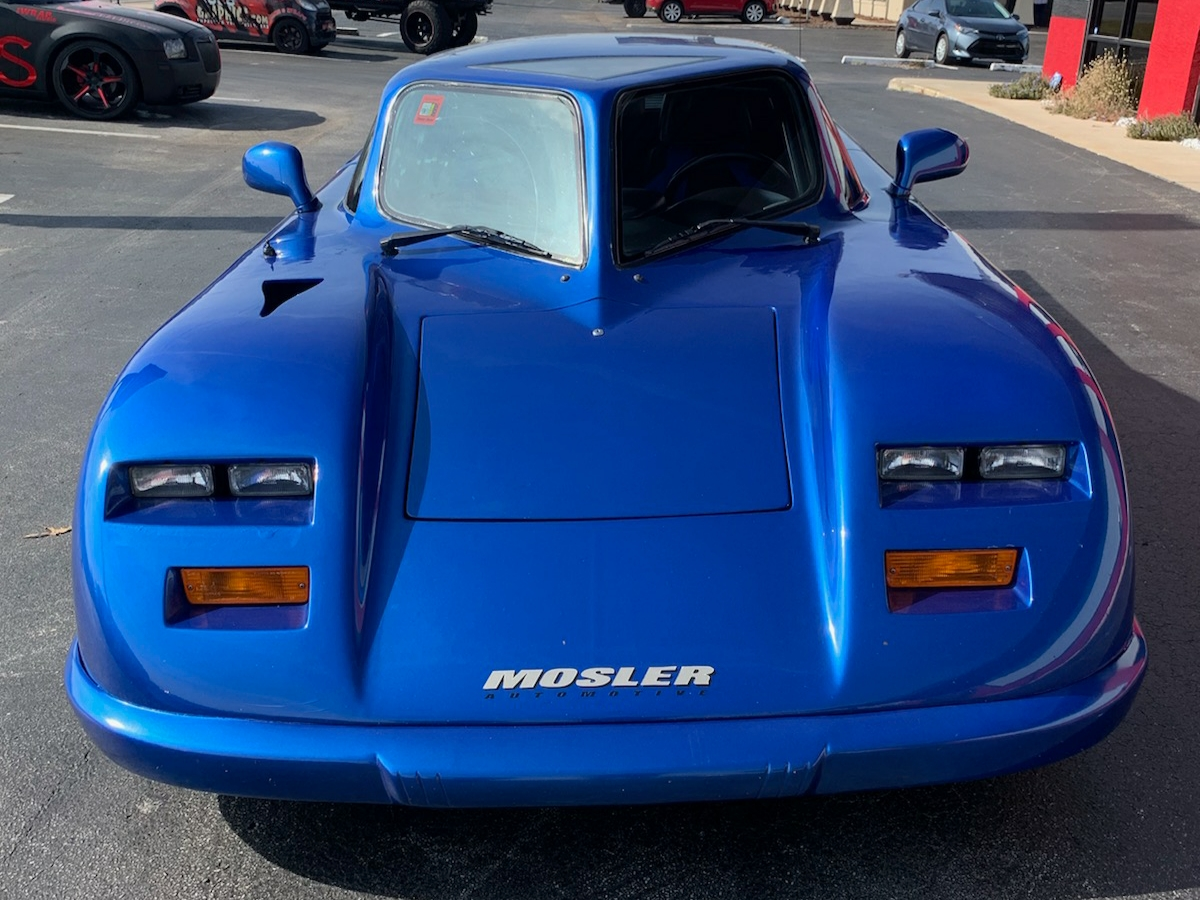
Mosler Raptor front

In 1997, the Intruder was renamed Raptor after being updated with a V-shaped split windshield that reduced drag.

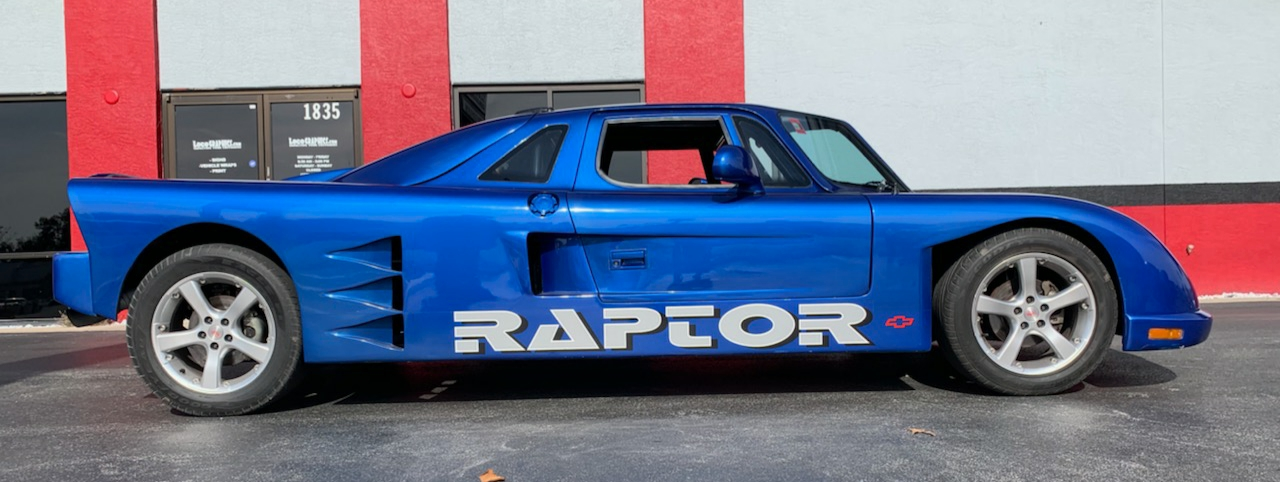
Mosler Raptor prototype profile

This slightly modified car (which had previously won the 1996 One Lap event) went on to win the same event in 1997 and 1999, after which Car and Driver editor Brock Yates banned it from competing again. This car was also tested by Car and Driver in 1998. In their tests, the car weighed 2,773 pounds (1,258 kg) and featured 446 hp (333 kW) at 5800 rpm and 429 lb⋅ft (582 N⋅m) at 5000 rpm. The 383 cu in (6.3 L) Small-Block V8 was again modified by Lingenfelter, and the five-speed transaxle came from a Porsche 911 Turbo.

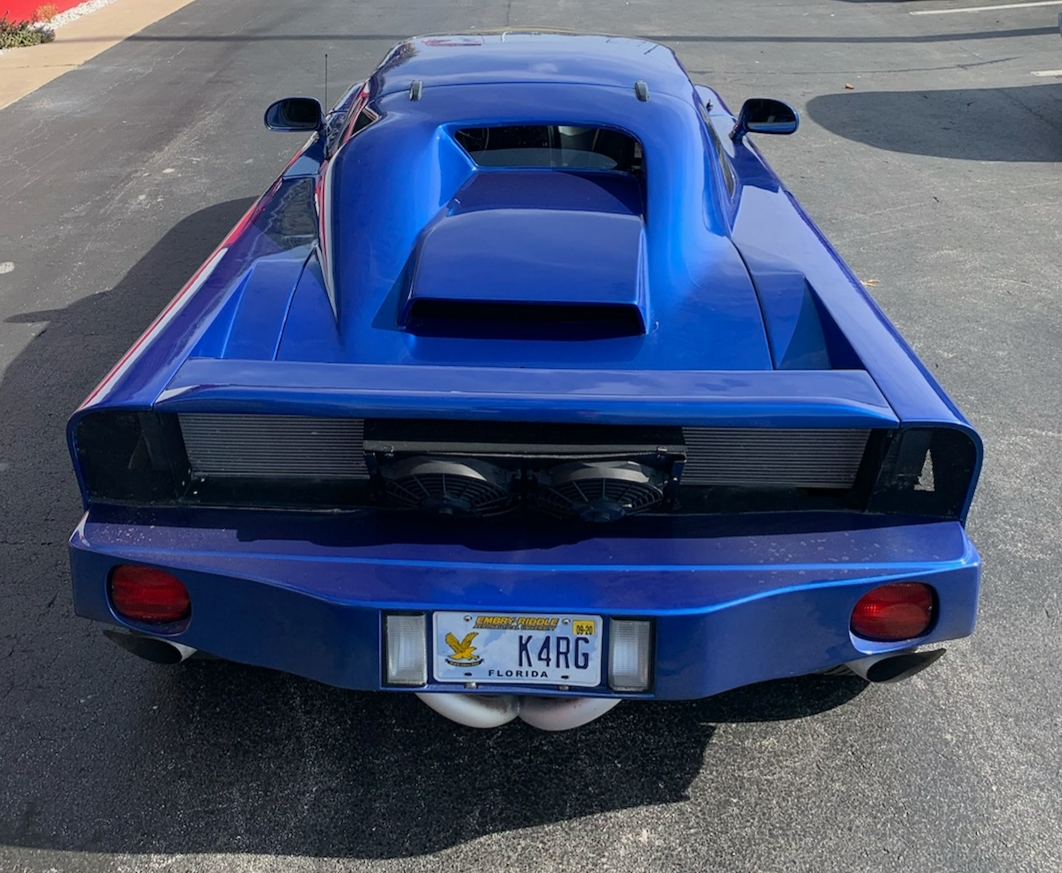
Mosler Raptor prototype rear

The mechanical components were still sourced mainly from Chrysler as they had been since 1985: for example, the steering wheel came from a Chrysler minivan. The new split windshield caused visibility problems and blocked some of the air vents. The tested performance of the car included a 3.9 second run to 60 mph (97 km/h) and a 12.3 second and 115 mph (185 km/h) sprint through the quarter mile. Top speed was 163 mph (262 km/h), limited by drag.

== Challenge with C4 Corvette ==
Warren Mosler was so confident in the performance of the GTP that he offered a $25,000 bounty to anyone who could pilot a street-legal production car around any U.S. racetrack faster than his car. Car and Driver took up the challenge, racing a 1988 Consulier GTP Series I Sport against a stock 1991 Chevrolet Corvette around the Chrysler proving grounds test track in Chelsea, Michigan. Arthur St. Antoine and Csaba Csere took three laps each in the Corvette and the GTP. They were able to obtain a best lap of 1:21.01 in the Corvette versus the GTP's best of 1:22.56. Reviewer St. Antoine opined that the GTP was "difficult to handle" with "anemic brakes".

When Car and Driver confronted Mosler with these results prior to publication, Mosler noted that the test car was three years old and worn out due to heavy use: the GTP obtained by Car and Driver was borrowed from a Track Time driver's school: it had worn tires and brake pads, no interior trim, and three cigarette lighters which were specially installed so Track Time could plug in their computer and portable radio equipment. Mosler offered to rerun the test using his company test driver and after installing new brake pads in the GTP, and agreed to pay the $25,000 if the GTP still didn't lap faster than the Corvette. Car and Driver refused, saying it might be faster because of the new driver. Mosler responded that they could use any driver they wanted for their car, but to have them drive the GTP and get paid if it lost due to a conflict of interest. Car and Driver subsequently published the Consulier GTP road test article in a negative and sarcastic light, where they ridiculed the borrowed car's lack of interior fit and finish and the three lighter plugs (failing to mention these were modifications made by the driving school), and compared the overall fit and finish negatively with a new Nissan 300ZX. They also claimed that Mosler defaulted on his promise. Supporting Mosler's position that the GTP should have won was the 1991 auto race in Lime Rock Park, with a Series II Consulier GTP. This car defeated Hurley Haywood's factory Porsche 911 Turbo, Boris Said's Callaway Twin Turbo Corvette, and Jim Minnaker's factory ZR1 Corvette; the race would be the GTP's last before it was banned from the IMSA series. To further back up his statements, Mosler raised the challenge to $100,000, however no production car was able to best the Series II Consulier GTP; it has been claimed that Chet Fillip bested the GTP, however he was in a modified RUF Porsche GT1 with racing slicks during his run at the Sebring International Raceway.
