= Mosler Automotive =

Defunct American motor vehicle manufacturer

- Company type: Private
- Industry: Automotive
- Predecessor: Consulier Industries
- Founded: 1985
- Founder: Warren Mosler
- Defunct: June 14, 2013
- Fate: Merged with Rossion Automotive
- Headquarters: Riviera Beach, Florida, United States
- Key people: Rod Trenne (13-1)
- Products: Sports cars, Racing cars, Megacars
- Parent: RP High Performance

Mosler Automotive was an American sports car manufacturer headquartered in Riviera Beach, Florida. It was founded in 1985 by Warren Mosler as Consulier Industries, and manufactured the Consulier GTP, which was later rebranded and updated as the Mosler Intruder/Raptor when the company spun off its automotive division as Mosler Automotive.

The company produced the MT900R racer and the street-legal MT900S, as well as several unique project vehicles, until its demise in June 2013 when all assets were acquired by Rossion Automotive. Additional manufacturing facilities were based in Norwich, England. Filmmaker George Lucas was the first to take delivery of the MT900S.

== History ==
=== Consulier Industries ===
In 1985, Warren Mosler started a company called Consulier Industries and introduced the Consulier GTP, a 2200 lb. mid-engined car powered by a mid-mounted turbocharged Chrysler 2.2 L engine producing 190 hp. The chassis was a fiberglass-and-foam monocoque.

=== Mosler automotive spin off ===
In 1993, Consulier Industries spun off its automotive division as Mosler Automotive. The newly named Mosler Automotive introduced the Intruder, a rebodied Consulier with a new 300 hp GM LT1 engine. This car raced at the 24 hours of Nelson Ledges for two consecutive years, winning both years – unfortunately, the Intruder was also banned after its dominating 1993-4 performances. In 1996, an Intruder modified by Lingenfelter Performance Engineering to yield 450 hp won Car and Driver's One Lap of America. It too was banned after three victories.

In 1997 the Intruder was given a V-shaped windshield that reduced drag, and renamed the Raptor, once again winning the 1997 One Lap of America. It also went on to win the 1999 One Lap. The Raptor entered in the 1997 One Lap weighed 2773 lb (1,258 kg) and had 443 hp (330 kW) from a Lingenfelter modified 6.3 L V8 engine.

In 2001, an all-new Mosler debuted – the Mosler MT900. This carbon-fiber chassis, rear wheel drive sports car was designed by using Siemens advanced design software, and used a 350 hp (261 kW), mid-mounted GM LS1 engine. An early prototype MT900S, despite being 390 pounds (177 kg) heavier and having 65 hp (49 kW) less power than the production version could achieve a 0-60 mph time of 3.5 seconds, and a quarter-mile time of 12 seconds flat. Since then, the MT900 has undergone several revisions to become the 2005 MT900S, which has 435 hp (324 kW) from its Corvette Z06-derived LS-6 V8, powering a 2,500 lb (1136 kg) car (without fuel). A Photon variant was available which added a Hewland transmission, thinwall subframes, BBS magnesium wheels, titanium springs, and carbon fiber seats and bodywork, reducing the car's mass to 1,980 lb (900 kg). Motor Trend with its guest hot shoe, Le Mans winner Justin Bell, behind the wheel reported a 0-60 time of 3.1 seconds, a standing quarter-mile time of 11.72 seconds and a standing mile time of 30.4 seconds. In addition to breaking acceleration records, Motor Trend also reported 60-0 braking in 100 feet, braking from 100-0 in 275 feet and the ultimate test, 0-100-0 in 10.98 seconds, breaking the 11.15 second record previously held by the McLaren F1 LM. It was discovered after the Motor Trend test that the Mosler MT900 test car had a faulty O2 sensor and was very down on power.

Introduced concurrently was the MT900R, a race prepared version of the MT900. In 2003, the MT900R won the GTS Division of the Rolex 24 Hours at Daytona. In Europe, the MT900R has successfully raced and won in the British GT Championship, FIA GT Tourist Trophy races, International Open GT Championship, Britcar Championship, Spanish GT Championship as well as selected races in other series. In 2008, The Mosler Dutch Supercar Challenge, an MT900R only race series ran its inaugural event at the famed Nürburgring F1 track.

Mosler also produced several one-off project vehicles, including a six-wheel custom Jeep that uses many GM components (dubbed the J-10 Sport) and the TwinStar, a Cadillac Eldorado boasting twin Northstar V-8s.

== Models ==
- Consulier GTP
  - Intruder
  - Raptor
- J-10 Sport
- TwinStar
- MT900
  - MT900R
  - MT900S
  - MT900S Photon
- Mosler GT300
- Mosler GT600
- Mosler Land Shark
