= 2010 Sylvania 300 =

Stock car race

Race details
- Race 27 of 36 in the 2010 NASCAR Sprint Cup Series
- The 2010 Sylvania 300 program cover, celebrating New Hampshire Motor Speedway's 20th anniversary. "20 Years of Motorsports Magic"
- Date: September 19, 2010
- Location: New Hampshire Motor Speedway, Loudon, New Hampshire
- Course: Permanent racing facility
- Course length: 1.058 miles (1.702 km)
- Distance: 300 laps, 317.4 mi (510.805 km)
- Weather: Mild with temperatures approaching 75.9 °F (24.4 °C); wind speeds up to 5.1 miles per hour (8.2 km/h)
- Average speed: 106.77 miles per hour (171.83 km/h)

Pole position
Driver	Brad Keselowski	Penske Racing
- Time: 28.515

Most laps led
Driver	Clint Bowyer	Richard Childress Racing
- Laps: 176

Winner
No. 33	Clint Bowyer	Richard Childress Racing

Television in the United States
- Network: ESPN
- Announcers: Marty Reid, Dale Jarrett and Andy Petree
- Nielsen ratings: 2.3/5 (Final); 2.1/5 (Overnight); (3.677 million)

Radio in the United States
- Radio: Performance Racing Network
- Booth announcers: Doug Rice, Mark Garrow
- Turn announcers: Rob Albright, Brad Gillie

The 2010 Sylvania 300 was a stock car racing competition that took place on September 19, 2010. Held at New Hampshire Motor Speedway in Loudon, New Hampshire, the 300-lap race was the twenty-seventh in the 2010 NASCAR Sprint Cup Series, as well as the first in the ten-race Chase for the Sprint Cup, which ended the season. Clint Bowyer of the Richard Childress Racing team won the race; Denny Hamlin finished second and Jamie McMurray came in third.

Brad Keselowski won the pole position, although he was almost immediately passed by Tony Stewart at the start of the race. Many Chase for the Sprint Cup participants, including Jimmie Johnson, Kurt Busch, and Hamlin, were in the top ten for most of the race, although some encountered problems in the closing laps. Stewart was leading the race with two laps remaining but ran out of fuel, giving the lead, and the win, to Bowyer. There were twenty-one lead changes among eight different drivers, as well as eight cautions during the race.

The race was Bowyer's first win in the 2010 season, and the third of his career. The result advanced Bowyer to second in the Drivers' Championship, thirty-five points behind Hamlin and ten ahead of Kevin Harvick, although he fell to twelfth in the standings after receiving a post-race penalty. Chevrolet maintained its lead in the Manufacturers' Championship, thirty-two points ahead of Toyota and seventy-four ahead of Ford, with nine races remaining in the season. Attendance was 95,000, while 3.68 million watched it on television.

== Report ==
=== Background ===
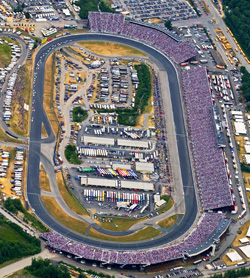
New Hampshire Motor Speedway, the race track where the race was held

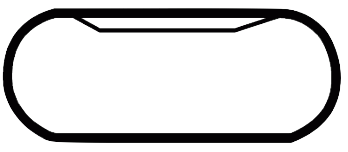
The layout of New Hampshire Motor Speedway, the venue where the race was held.

New Hampshire Motor Speedway is one of ten intermediate tracks that hold NASCAR races. The standard track at New Hampshire Motor Speedway is a four-turn oval track, 1.058 miles (1.703 km) long. Its banking in the turns varies from two to seven degrees, while the front stretch, the finish line, and the back stretch are all banked at one degree.

Before the race, Denny Hamlin led the Drivers' Championship with 5,060 points, followed by Jimmie Johnson with 5,050. Kevin Harvick and Kyle Busch were tied for third place with 5,030 points, and Kyle's older brother Kurt Busch had 5,020 points. Tony Stewart, with 5,010 points, was tied with Greg Biffle, and Jeff Gordon, Carl Edwards, Jeff Burton, Matt Kenseth and Clint Bowyer rounded out the top twelve with 5,000 points each. In the Manufacturers' Championship, Chevrolet was leading with 188 points, twenty-nine points ahead of their rival Toyota. Ford, with 120 points, was fifteen points ahead of Dodge in the battle for third place. Mark Martin was the race's defending champion.

A number of drivers competing in the 2010 Chase for the Sprint Cup entered the race optimistic about their chances of winning the championship. Biffle argued that he, Burton, or Stewart were "capable of winning it". Johnson, who already had eighteen previous wins in the Chase, observed that "those 10 races in the Chase is its own world. The people act and react differently under pressure, and for the last four years we have done a great job in that environment." Hamlin commented, "Reliability is the only thing we need to work on. It's taken us out of the last three Chases, not being reliable. You have to have it to be the champion." Ray Evernham also opined on Hamlin, "I think Denny knows that he has the talent to win the championship. I think that he's got focus right now and a good, veteran crew chief in Mike Ford. If Toyota gives him the speed, he could be a threat."

=== Practice and qualifying ===
Three practice sessions were held before the Sunday race—one on Friday, and two on Saturday. The first session lasted 90 minutes, and the second 50 minutes. The final session lasted 60 minutes. During the first practice session, Stewart was fastest, placing ahead of Edwards in second and Marcos Ambrose in third. A. J. Allmendinger was scored fourth, and Kyle Busch placed fifth. David Ragan, Johnson, Brad Keselowski, Biffle, and Hamlin rounded out the top ten fastest drivers in the session.

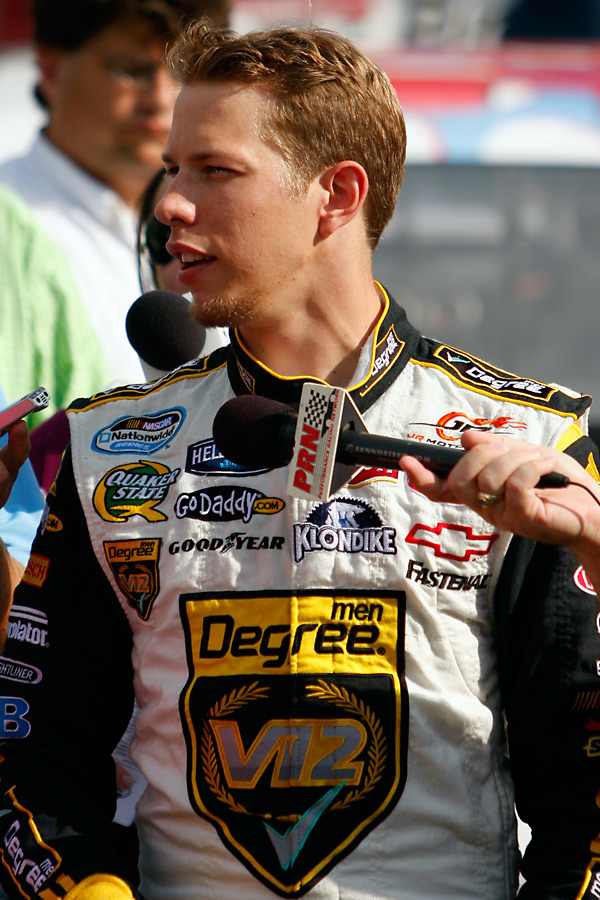
Brad Keselowski won pole position with the fastest time, 28.515.

Forty-five drivers attempted to qualify; due to NASCAR's qualifying procedure, only forty-three could race. Keselowski clinched his first pole position in the Sprint Cup Series, with a time of 28.515. He was joined on the front row of the grid by Bowyer. Stewart qualified third, Jamie McMurray took fourth, and Juan Pablo Montoya started fifth. Johnson, one of the drivers in the Chase for the Sprint Cup, qualified twenty-fifth, while Harvick was scored in twenty-seventh. The two drivers who failed to qualify for the race were Jeff Green and Johnny Sauter. Once qualifying concluded Keselowski said, "I felt I got a shot at the pole before I qualified but you never really know. When I ran the lap I knew I gave up a little bit of time right in the middle of both corners but I had a plan going into it and stuck to it and it worked. I’m really proud of that lap."

On Saturday morning, Stewart was fastest in the second practice session, ahead of Sam Hornish Jr. in second, and McMurray in third. Ryan Newman was fourth quickest, and Bowyer took fifth. Kurt Busch, who ended up receiving a penalty for using extra tires, managed sixth. Mark Martin, Johnson, Kasey Kahne, and Montoya followed in the top ten. Of the other drivers in the Chase, Hamlin was scored sixteenth fastest, while Harvick was scored in twenty-fourth. McMurray paced the final practice session, with Jeff Gordon and Johnson following in second and third respectively. Stewart was fourth fastest, ahead of Montoya and Bowyer. Hamlin was scored seventh, Kahne eighth, Dale Earnhardt Jr. ninth, and David Reutimann tenth. Other Chase drivers included Kyle Busch in twenty-first and Kenseth in thirtieth.

=== Race ===
The race, the twenty-seventh of a total of thirty-six in the 2010 season, began at 1:00 p.m. EDT and was televised live in the United States on ESPN. Around the start of the race, weather conditions were partly cloudy with an air temperature around 70 °F (21 °C). Jonathan DeFelice, president of St. Anselm College in Goffstown, New Hampshire, began pre-race ceremonies with the invocation. Anthony Gargiula performed the national anthem, and Mark Corcoran, VP of Industrial and Commercial Sales for Sylvania, gave the command for drivers to start their engines. During the pace laps, two drivers had to move to the rear of the grid due to unapproved changes: David Gilliland because of an engine change, and Andy Lally because of a transmission change.

Keselowski retained his pole position lead into the first corner, with Bowyer behind him. One lap later, Stewart passed Keselowski to become the new race leader; Montoya passed Keselowski for the second position on the next lap. By lap eight, Stewart had a lead of over one second. After starting the race in twelfth, Kurt Busch moved up to ninth position by lap nine. Paul Menard, who started in eighth, fell to eleventh position by lap twelve. After losing two positions early, Bowyer moved back up into third position by passing Keselowski. By the nineteenth lap, Johnson had moved up eight positions to seventeenth, and Harvick had moved up seven positions to twentieth.

Earnhardt, who began the race in thirty-second, had moved up ten positions to twenty-second by lap 22. Two laps later, Bowyer passed Montoya for second position. Scott Speed spun sideways and collided with the wall four laps later, causing the first caution of the race. On lap 28, Robby Gordon moved into the lead for one lap, delaying his pit stop until lap 29. Once the race resumed, Bowyer regained the lead followed by McMurray in second. McMurray led the next lap, but Bowyer reclaimed the lead on lap 32. Three laps later, Kyle Busch, in seventh place, collided with the wall, but escaped with minor damage. A collision involving Ambrose and Menard occurred on lap 39 and prompted the second caution.

Most drivers stayed on the track during the caution, allowing Bowyer to remain the leader on the restart. On lap 48, Michael McDowell drove to the garage because of engine problems. Five laps later, Bowyer led the race, with McMurray 1.3 seconds behind him. Landon Cassill went to the garage due to failing brakes on lap 56. Johnson moved into sixth, as Edwards passed McMurray five laps later for second. By lap 64, Bowyer's lead was over 3.5 seconds.

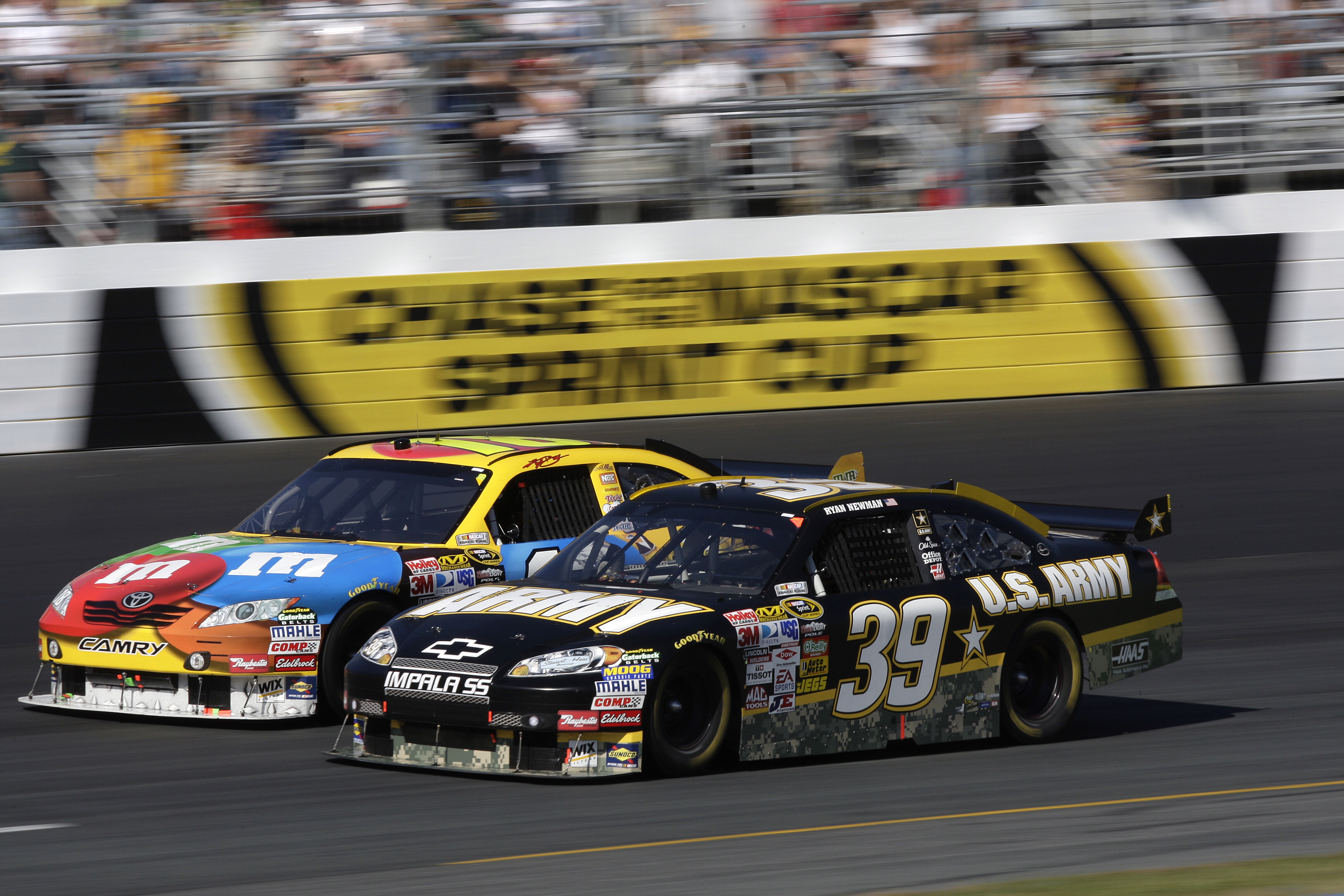
Kyle Busch and Ryan Newman during the race

Four laps later, Johnson passed Keselowski to claim fifth position. On the 81st lap, Earnhardt Jr. moved into seventh after passing David Reutimann and Stewart. Two laps later, Kurt Busch and Jeff Burton passed Reutimann for ninth and tenth respectively. During lap 90, Earnhardt passed Keselowski for sixth, as Johnson claimed fourth from McMurray. After 93 laps, Bowyer's lead was over five seconds. Two laps later, green flag pit stops began, as Montoya was the first to pit. On lap 98, Edwards became the new leader after Bowyer came into the pits. One lap later, Kurt Busch became the new leader, followed by Jeff Gordon and Robby Gordon. On lap 102, Bowyer reclaimed the lead as the previous leaders made their stops. Bobby Labonte and Casey Mears were unable to continue the race after their pit stops.

On lap 113, Burton moved up to sixth, while Jeff Gordon passed Earnhardt for eleventh. Allmendinger fell to twenty-fifth after pit stops due to having run out of fuel on his way onto pit road. Three laps later, both Jeff Gordon and Earnhardt had passed Reutimann for tenth and eleventh respectively. By lap 120, Bowyer had a lead of about four seconds over Edwards. Four laps later, Harvick passed Montoya for fourteenth. On lap 132, Keselowski fell to ninth after being passed by Kurt Busch and Hamlin. On lap 147, Bowyer's lead of over seven seconds was reduced to nothing when the pace car moved on track. During the caution, which was caused by debris, most of the leaders made pit stops.

Bowyer maintained his lead on the restart. On lap 153, Kyle Busch moved into tenth position by passing Jeff Gordon. Seven laps later, Burton claimed fourth. On the 162nd lap, Ryan Newman moved up to eleventh, as Keselowski fell to twelfth. Two laps later, Jeff Gordon passed Kyle Busch to move into ninth, while Stewart passed Burton for fourth. On lap 177, Montoya passed Kyle Busch for tenth position. Afterward, Kyle Busch fell to twelfth after being passed by Newman. By lap 192, Bowyer had a 3.5 second lead over McMurray. One lap later, Montoya passed Kurt Busch for ninth. On lap 199, Harvick moved into fifteenth position. Two laps later, Hamlin passed Jeff Burton to claim fifth.

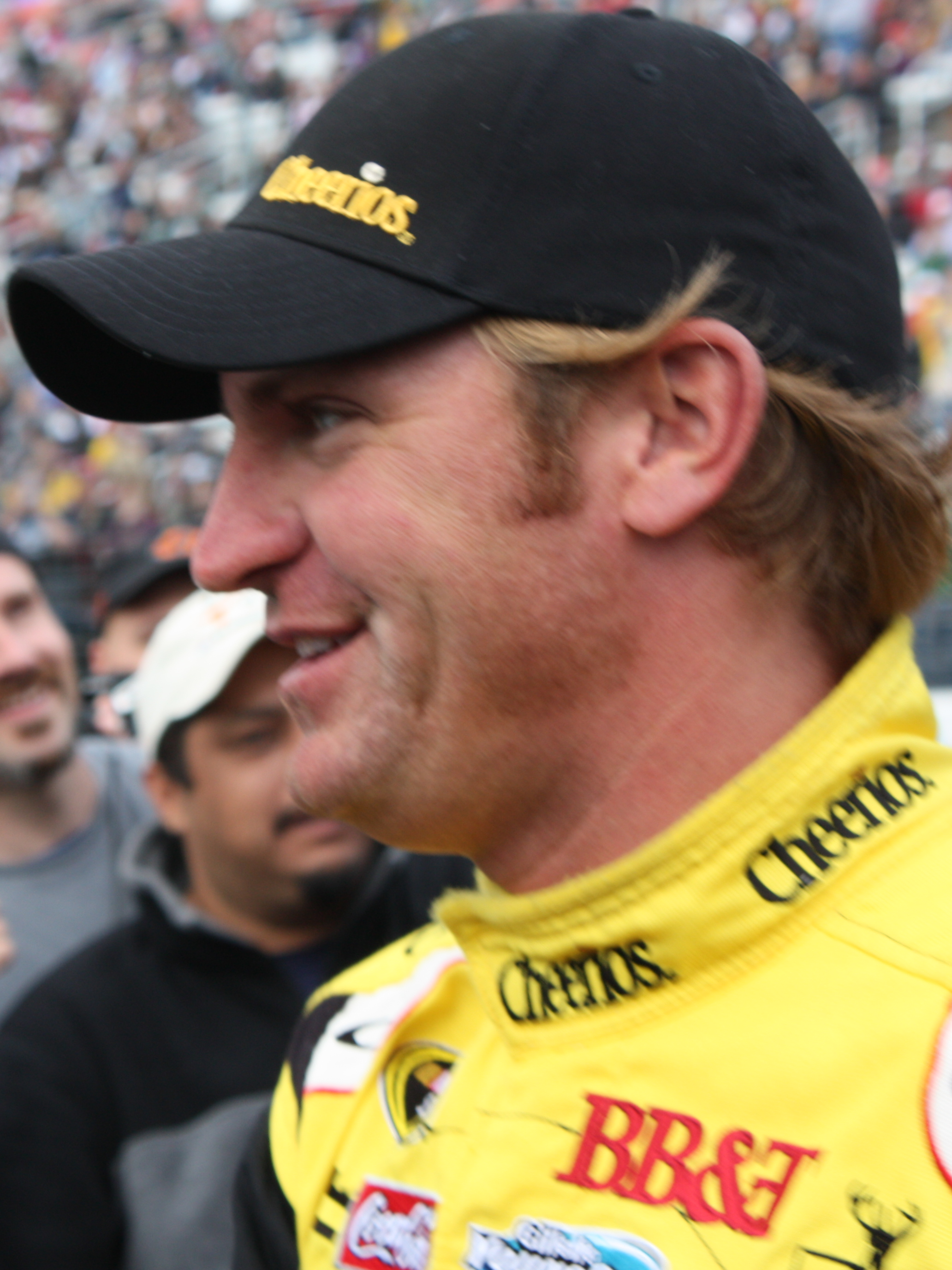
Clint Bowyer won the race after overtaking Tony Stewart with two laps remaining.

On lap 206, Martin's car suffered a flat tire and the fourth caution was given as a result. Bowyer led on the restart, although he was passed by Stewart within one lap. On lap 213, Hamlin spun sideways, prompting the fifth caution. Despite remaining undamaged, Hamlin fell from fourth to twenty-second position. Stewart led on the restart, as Jeff Gordon claimed second from Bowyer. By lap 221, a sixth caution came out as Kurt Busch, Johnson, and Kyle Busch all spun sideways. After the accident, Johnson fell to twenty-fourth; Stewart maintained his lead on the restart. Five laps later, Matt Kenseth spun out, causing the seventh caution. Stewart led the drivers back to the green flag, but was overtaken by McMurray one lap later.

On lap 241, the pace car came out for the eighth and final caution, after Joey Logano collided with the outside wall. McMurray led on the restart, but Stewart reclaimed the lead on lap 247. Seven laps later, Johnson was forced to pit due to a loose wheel. By lap 257, Stewart had a lead of over one second. Five laps later, Hamlin claimed sixth from Harvick. During the 263rd lap, Bowyer passed McMurray for second. Four laps later, Newman passed Kyle Busch for tenth position. After 269 laps, Stewart's lead over Bowyer was 1.6 seconds. Six laps later, Hamlin moved into fifth position after passing Earnhardt. During lap 290, Hamlin passed McMurray for third. With two laps remaining, Stewart and Burton both ran out of fuel, handing the lead back to Bowyer. Bowyer maintained the lead to win his first race of the 2010 season. Hamlin finished second, ahead of McMurray in third, Earnhardt in fourth, and Harvick in fifth.

=== Post-race comments ===
"I couldn't believe it. Those are the kind of chances you're going to have to take to beat guys in this Chase. That's the chances that people that win races take every week."

— Bowyer, speaking after the race.

Bowyer appeared in Victory Lane to celebrate his first win of the season in front of 95,000 people who attended the race. Bowyer also earned $248,250 in race winnings. Stewart took his last-minute loss of the race with good humor, saying, "We went down swinging. I think I ran me out of fuel." In the subsequent post-race press conference, Hamlin said, "First thing I asked is how many cars on the lead lap, because I wanted to see how bad our day was going to be. I set a goal (of) top 15, and then it was top eight and then top six and, 'Holy cow, we can win this thing.' We just made a heck of a charge at the end." Bowyer was delighted with his victory: "[Crew chief] Shane [Wilson] built a brand new race car and we came here and we were fast right off the truck, and everybody had a lot of confidence, a pep in their step. And we showed it from the time we unloaded to qualifying, practice, we were one of the fastest cars here. That’s what it takes to run at this level, to be a part of that Chase, if we can go and continue to have as much fun as we did this weekend. I know it’s the key, I know it is to my success."

Johnson was candid about his performance: "We had a decent car and ran in the top five and top 10 but just didn't end up finishing there." Harvick was somewhat more upbeat, saying, "We didn't have a great day. We didn't have a great weekend, honestly, and (fifth) says a lot about this team. If we keep doing that on our bad days, we will be in good shape." The race result left Hamlin leading the Drivers' Championship with 5,230 points. Bowyer, who finished first, moved to second on 5,195, ten points ahead of Harvick and twenty-seven ahead of Kyle Busch. In the Manufacturers' Championship, Chevrolet maintained the lead with 197 points. Toyota remained second with 165 points. Ford followed with 123 points, fourteen points ahead of Dodge in fourth. 3.68 million people watched the race on television. The race took two hours, fifty-eight minutes and twenty-two seconds to complete, and the margin of victory was 0.477 seconds.

Although Bowyer's car passed initial inspection, NASCAR announced that they had "discovered issues with the car in a more thorough inspection at its research and development center". Three days after the race, two teams were given penalties: Richard Childress Racing for Bowyer's car, and Whitney Motorsports for McDowell's car. Richard Childress Racing's penalty, for unauthorized alterations to the rear bodywork of Bowyer's car, included a $150,000 fine and a six race suspension for Wilson, and the loss of 150 owner and driver points for Richard Childress and Bowyer respectively. RCR's car chief, Chad Haney, was placed on probation until December 31, 2010, and suspended from NASCAR until November 3, 2010. Whitney Motorsports' penalty was for engine exhaust valves that did not meet NASCAR's weight requirements. The penalties for that included a $50,000 fine and six race suspension for Jeremy Lafaver, while both McDowell and owner Dusty Whitney lost 50 driver and owner points respectively.

Childress and Bowyer were both upset with the penalties and almost immediately announced plans to appeal. Bowyer argued the penalties to be too severe, saying, "I don't think the penalty fits the crime. Sixty-thousandths of an inch, folks. Grab a quarter out of your pocket. Less than the thickness of that quarter right there is worth a 150-point fine?" He also argued that his car could have been damaged slightly after the race as his car was pushed by a wrecker after it ran out of gas on its way to victory lane. "Is it possible that a two-ton wrecker could bend the quarter-panel 60-thousandths of an inch? You have to ask yourself that." The team lost the initial appeal, forcing them to make a final appeal to NASCAR National Commissioner John Middlebrook. As a result of the final appeal, Wilson's fine was reduced to $100,000 while he and Haney's suspensions were reduced from six to four races (they were allowed to work with the team during the appeal process); however, the points penalty administered to Bowyer and his team was upheld.

Asked if he thought Bowyer could still win the championship after this setback, Stewart argued, "It's possible for sure. The biggest thing is going to be going to the race track and having that stress of not having his crew chief, not having his car chief and those are two key people on a race weekend ... I can promise you that Childress has the resources to cover this ... it's definitely possible, but everyone else is going to have to have trouble." Bowyer did not lose the victory title for the race itself; NASCAR vice president of competition Robin Pemberton commented, "We don't consider taking away the win. If you ask some, they would consider a 150-point penalty with only nine races to go in the Chase a pretty hefty penalty."

== Results ==
=== Qualifying ===
Grid	No.	Driver	Team	Manufacturer	Time	Speed
1	12	Brad Keselowski	Penske Racing	Dodge	28.515	133.572
2	33	Clint Bowyer	Richard Childress Racing	Chevrolet	28.538	133.464
3	14	Tony Stewart	Stewart–Haas Racing	Chevrolet	28.549	133.413
4	1	Jamie McMurray	Earnhardt Ganassi Racing	Chevrolet	28.554	133.389
5	42	Juan Pablo Montoya	Earnhardt Ganassi Racing	Chevrolet	28.561	133.357
6	43	A. J. Allmendinger	Richard Petty Motorsports	Ford	28.579	133.273
7	00	David Reutimann	Michael Waltrip Racing	Toyota	28.584	133.249
8	98	Paul Menard	Richard Petty Motorsports	Ford	28.615	133.105
9	18	Kyle Busch	Joe Gibbs Racing	Toyota	28.617	133.096
10	99	Carl Edwards	Roush Fenway Racing	Ford	28.629	133.040
11	6	David Ragan	Roush Fenway Racing	Ford	28.644	132.970
12	2	Kurt Busch	Penske Racing	Dodge	28.667	132.864
13	31	Jeff Burton	Richard Childress Racing	Chevrolet	28.700	132.711
14	16	Greg Biffle	Roush Fenway Racing	Ford	28.716	132.637
15	77	Sam Hornish Jr.	Penske Racing	Dodge	28.737	132.540
16	56	Martin Truex Jr.	Michael Waltrip Racing	Toyota	28.761	132.429
17	24	Jeff Gordon	Hendrick Motorsports	Chevrolet	28.787	132.310
18	13	Casey Mears	Germain Racing	Toyota	28.811	132.199
19	19	Elliott Sadler	Richard Petty Motorsports	Ford	28.818	132.167
20	78	Regan Smith	Furniture Row Racing	Chevrolet	28.829	132.117
21	9	Kasey Kahne	Richard Petty Motorsports	Ford	28.833	132.099
22	11	Denny Hamlin	Joe Gibbs Racing	Toyota	28.834	132.094
23	47	Marcos Ambrose	JTG Daugherty Racing	Toyota	28.836	132.085
24	39	Ryan Newman	Stewart–Haas Racing	Chevrolet	28.842	132.057
25	48	Jimmie Johnson	Hendrick Motorsports	Chevrolet	28.856	131.993
26	5	Mark Martin	Hendrick Motorsports	Chevrolet	28.859	131.980
27	29	Kevin Harvick	Richard Childress Racing	Chevrolet	28.880	131.884
28	82	Scott Speed	Red Bull Racing Team	Toyota	28.916	131.719
29	7	Robby Gordon	Robby Gordon Motorsports	Toyota	28.939	131.615
30	36	Dave Blaney	Tommy Baldwin Racing	Chevrolet	28.957	131.533
31	20	Joey Logano	Joe Gibbs Racing	Toyota	29.032	131.193
32	88	Dale Earnhardt Jr.	Hendrick Motorsports	Chevrolet	29.044	131.139
33	17	Matt Kenseth	Roush Fenway Racing	Ford	29.070	131.022
34	64	Landon Cassill	Gunselman Motorsports	Toyota	29.111	130.837
35	87	Joe Nemechek	NEMCO Motorsports	Toyota	29.147	130.676
36	55	Mike Bliss	Prism Motorsports	Toyota	29.299	129.998
37	83	Reed Sorenson	Red Bull Racing Team	Toyota	29.338	129.825
38	46	Michael McDowell	Whitney Motorsports	Dodge	29.406	129.525
39	37	David Gilliland	Front Row Motorsports	Ford	29.416	129.481
40	38	Travis Kvapil	Front Row Motorsports	Ford	29.479	129.204
41	34	Tony Raines	Front Row Motorsports	Ford	29.582	128.754
42	71	Andy Lally	TRG Motorsports	Chevrolet	29.599	128.680
43	09	Bobby Labonte	Phoenix Racing	Chevrolet	Champion's Provisional	
Failed to qualify
44	66	Johnny Sauter	Prism Motorsports	Toyota	29.569	128.811
45	26	Jeff Green	Latitude 43 Motorsports	Ford	29.655	128.437

=== Race results ===
Pos	No.	Driver	Team	Manufacturer	Laps	Points
1	33	Clint Bowyer	Richard Childress Racing	Chevrolet	300	195^{2}
2	11	Denny Hamlin	Joe Gibbs Racing	Toyota	300	170
3	1	Jamie McMurray	Earnhardt Ganassi Racing	Chevrolet	300	170^{1}
4	88	Dale Earnhardt Jr.	Hendrick Motorsports	Chevrolet	300	160
5	29	Kevin Harvick	Richard Childress Racing	Chevrolet	300	155
6	24	Jeff Gordon	Hendrick Motorsports	Chevrolet	300	155^{1}
7	00	David Reutimann	Michael Waltrip Racing	Toyota	300	146
8	39	Ryan Newman	Stewart–Haas Racing	Chevrolet	300	142
9	18	Kyle Busch	Joe Gibbs Racing	Toyota	300	138
10	77	Sam Hornish Jr.	Penske Racing	Dodge	300	134
11	99	Carl Edwards	Roush Fenway Racing	Ford	300	135^{1}
12	43	A. J. Allmendinger	Richard Petty Motorsports	Ford	300	127
13	2	Kurt Busch	Penske Racing	Dodge	300	124
14	9	Kasey Kahne	Richard Petty Motorsports	Ford	300	121
15	31	Jeff Burton	Richard Childress Racing	Chevrolet	300	118
16	42	Juan Pablo Montoya	Earnhardt Ganassi Racing	Chevrolet	300	115
17	16	Greg Biffle	Roush Fenway Racing	Ford	300	112
18	12	Brad Keselowski	Penske Racing	Dodge	300	114^{1}
19	78	Regan Smith	Furniture Row Racing	Chevrolet	300	106
20	56	Martin Truex Jr.	Michael Waltrip Racing	Toyota	300	103
21	19	Elliott Sadler	Richard Petty Motorsports	Ford	300	100
22	6	David Ragan	Roush Fenway Racing	Ford	300	97
23	17	Matt Kenseth	Roush Fenway Racing	Ford	300	94
24	14	Tony Stewart	Stewart–Haas Racing	Chevrolet	300	96^{1}
25	48	Jimmie Johnson	Hendrick Motorsports	Chevrolet	299	88
26	7	Robby Gordon	Robby Gordon Motorsports	Toyota	299	90^{1}
27	83	Reed Sorenson	Red Bull Racing Team	Toyota	299	82
28	98	Paul Menard	Richard Petty Motorsports	Ford	299	79
29	5	Mark Martin	Hendrick Motorsports	Chevrolet	298	76
30	47	Marcos Ambrose	JTG Daugherty Racing	Toyota	298	73
31	36	Dave Blaney	Tommy Baldwin Racing	Chevrolet	297	70
32	38	Travis Kvapil	Front Row Motorsports	Ford	295	67
33	37	David Gilliland	Front Row Motorsports	Ford	295	64
34	34	Tony Raines	Front Row Motorsports	Ford	295	61
35	20	Joey Logano	Joe Gibbs Racing	Toyota	256	58
36	82	Scott Speed	Red Bull Racing Team	Toyota	213	55
37	71	Andy Lally	TRG Motorsports	Chevrolet	138	52
38	13	Casey Mears	Germain Racing	Toyota	93	49
39	09	Bobby Labonte	Phoenix Racing	Chevrolet	89	46
40	87	Joe Nemechek	NEMCO Motorsports	Toyota	60	48^{1}
41	55	Mike Bliss	Prism Motorsports	Toyota	55	40
42	64	Landon Cassill	Gunselman Motorsports	Toyota	40	37
43	46	Michael McDowell	Whitney Motorsports	Dodge	29	34
^{1} Includes five bonus points for leading a lap
^{2} Includes ten bonus points for leading the most laps

== Standings after the race ==
Drivers' Championship standings
Rank	+/–	Driver	Points
1		Denny Hamlin	5,230
2	1	Kevin Harvick	5,185 (–45)
3	1	Kyle Busch	5,168 (–62)
4	4	Jeff Gordon	5,155 (–75)
5		Kurt Busch	5,144 (–86)
6	4	Jimmie Johnson	5,138 (–92)
7	2	Carl Edwards	5,135 (–95)
8	1	Greg Biffle	5,122 (–108)
9	1	Jeff Burton	5,118 (–112)
10	4	Tony Stewart	5,106 (–124)
11		Matt Kenseth	5,094 (–136)
12		Clint Bowyer	5,045 (–185)

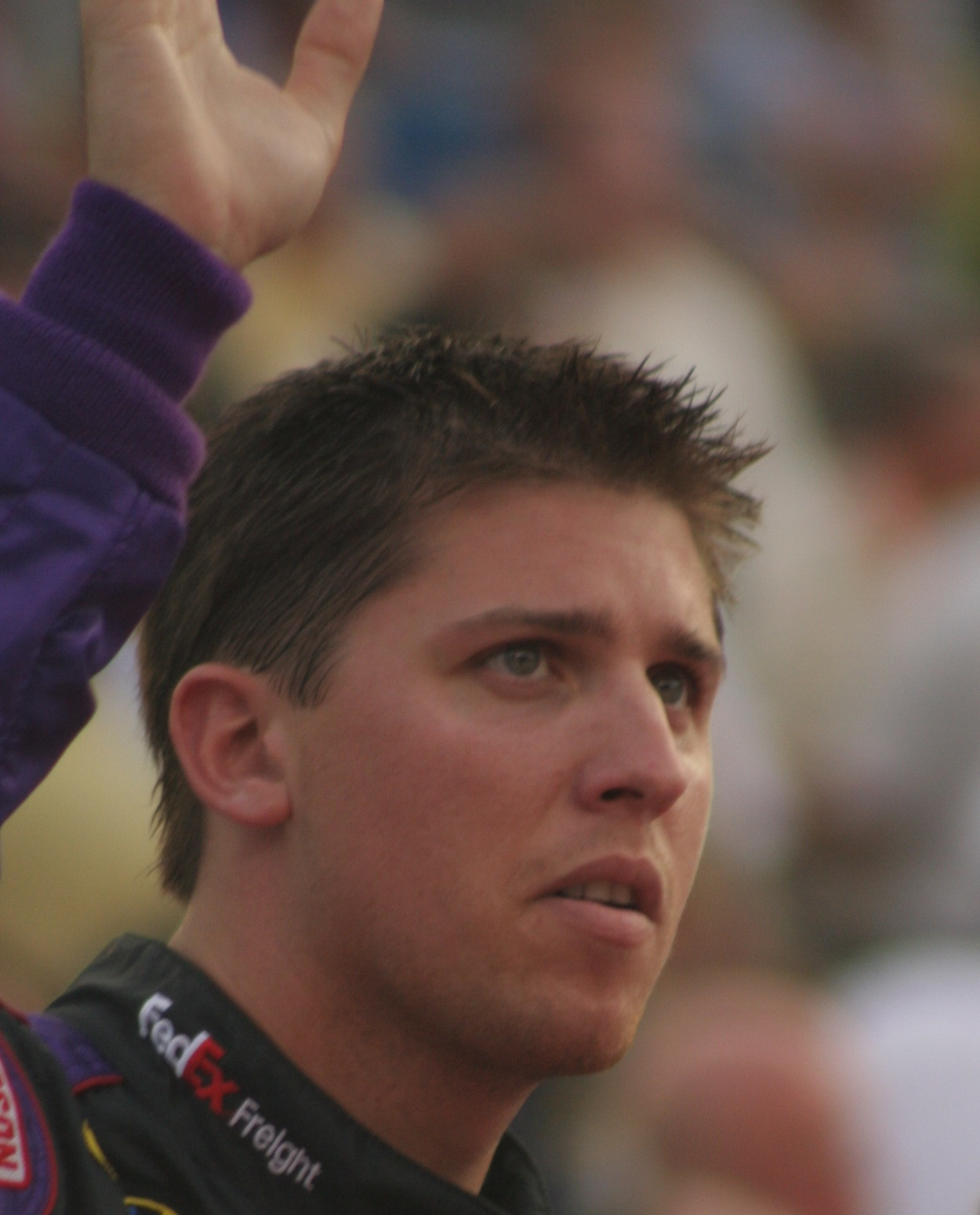
After finishing second in the race, Denny Hamlin remained the points leader with 5,230 points.

Manufacturers' Championship standings
Rank	+/–	Manufacturer	Points
1		Chevrolet	197
2		Toyota	165 (–32)
3		Ford	123 (–74)
4		Dodge	109 (–88)

- Note: Only the top twelve positions are included for the driver standings. These drivers qualified for the Chase for the Sprint Cup.

Previous race: 2010 Air Guard 400	Sprint Cup Series; 2010 season	Next race: 2010 AAA 400
