= Twinstar =

Twinstar may refer to:

- Diamond DA42 Twin Star, a light twin-engine aircraft built by Diamond Aircraft
- Eurocopter AS355 TwinStar, a twin-engine light helicopter originally manufactured by Aérospatiale
- Honda Twinstar, a CM series motorcycle made during the late 1970s
- Farrington Twinstar, an American autogyro design
- Mosler TwinStar, an automobile developed by Mosler Automotive in 2000
- Kolb Twinstar, ultralight aircraft
- "Twinstar", a song by Veruca Salt from their 1994 album American Thighs
- Solar twin star, in astronomy is otherwise known as a Solar analog
- TwinStar Credit Union, a community credit union in Washington State and Oregon
- Twin Stars (film), a 2025 Italian comedy
