= Csere =

Csere is a Hungarian surname. Notable people with the surname include:

- Alexis Skyy, born Csere
- Csaba Csere, American mechanical engineer and magazine editor
- Gáspár Csere
- János Apáczai Csere (1625–1659), Hungarian polyglot and mathematician

== See also ==
- 25778 Csere, outer main-belt asteroid
