= Mosler GT600 =

- Category: GT3
- Constructor: Mosler Automotive
- Predecessor: Mosler GT300
- Successor: Mosler MT900R

Technical specifications
- Chassis: Carbon fibre tub on space frame
- Engine: Chevrolet LS7 7,011 cc (427.8 cu in) 16 valve, OHV V8, naturally aspirated,
- Transmission: Hewland LWS 6-speed sequential

Competition history
- Notable entrants: Blue Jumeirah Team
- Notable drivers: Rafael Unzurrunzaga
Races	Wins	Poles	F/Laps
14 (9 starts)	0	0	0
- Teams' Championships: 0
- Constructors' Championships: 0
- Drivers' Championships: 0

The Mosler GT600 (also known as the Mosler Super GT600) was a sports racing car built by Mosler Automotive in 2011 for the GT3 category. A more powerful version of Mosler's GT300 car, it shares its chassis with that car, but uses a 600 hp (447 kW; 608 PS) 7-litre Chevrolet LS7 V8 engine. One car was built, as the car was built for Rafael Unzurrunzaga.

== Design and development ==
In 2011, Rafael Unzurrunzaga approached Mosler Automotive, asking for a more powerful version of the firm's GT300. Like the GT300, the GT600 used a space frame chassis, and shared the same carbon fibre bodywork. However, the 300 hp (224 kW; 304 PS) engine fitted in the GT300 was replaced with a 7-litre Chevrolet LS7 V8, capable of producing 600 hp (447 kW; 608 PS). A MoTeC ECU, dashboard and PDM system was fitted, and the GT600 became the first car to use the 6-speed sequential Hewland LWS gearbox. The car was delivered to Unzurrunzaga in July 2011, at Donington Park, where the car was also tested.

== Racing history ==
=== Europe ===
The GT600's racing debut came at the Estoril round of the Spanish GT Championship on 17 July 2011, where Unzurrunzaga ran the car under the Blue Jumeirah Team banner. Competing in the GTS class, he finished 14th overall, and sixth in class. Unzurrunzaga then switched to the Red Bull Ring round of the International GT Open, but was unable to start either race. Two months later, he returned to the GT Open, competing in the Catalunya round; having missed the start of the first race, he could do no better than 24th overall, and tenth in the GTS category, in the second race. Unzurrunzaga was classified eleventh in the Spanish GT Championship's GTS Driver's Championship, with six points.

=== UAE ===
Following the Catalunya race, Unzurrunzaga entered the third round of the 2011–12 UAE GT Championship, held at Dubai Autodrome; however, he retired after 14 laps. He finished 2011 by taking seventh overall, and fourth in the GTA category, in the following round, held at Yas Marina. The fifth round of the season, and the first of 2012, was also held at Yas Marina; Unzurrunzaga won the first race of the day, before taking second in the second race, resulting in him finishing second overall. The series then returned to Dubai, where Unzurrunzaga finished second. The next round of the UAE GT Championship was also held at Dubai, but Unzurrunzaga was unable to start either race. The series then returned to Yas Marina, but Unzurrunzaga was not classified in the first race, and did not compete in the second. This would be the GT600's last race; Unzurrunzaga returned to Europe, and replaced the GT600 with a Mosler MT900R.
