= Charles D. Strang =

American inventor and businessman

Charles Daniel Strang (April 12, 1921 – March 11, 2018) was an American inventor who was the President, CEO and Chairman of the Board of Outboard Marine Corporation, a multibillion-dollar Fortune 500 corporation. Strang was born in Brooklyn, New York in April 1921. He graduated from what is now NYU Poly. Prior to joining Outboard Marine, Strang was a faculty member at Massachusetts Institute of Technology (MIT) and chief engineer for Mercury Marine. Strang is the inventor of the modern Sterndrive. From 1998 to 2009, Strang was NASCAR National Commissioner. Strang died in March 2018 at the age of 96.
