= Erwin Baker =

American motorcycle racer (1882–1960)

Erwin "Cannon Ball" Baker
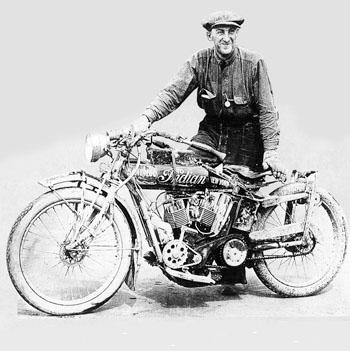
- Baker in New York with his Indian motorcycle after his 1912 international journey
- Born: Erwin George Baker; March 12, 1882 Dearborn County, Indiana, U.S.
- Died: May 11, 1960 (aged 78) Indianapolis, Indiana, U.S.

Champ Car career
- 1 race run over 1 year
- First race: 1922 Indianapolis 500 (Indianapolis)
Wins	Podiums	Poles
0	0	0

Erwin George "Cannonball"/"Cannon Ball" Baker (March 12, 1882 – May 10, 1960) was an American motorcycle and automobile racer and organizer in the first half of the 20th century. Baker began his public career as a vaudeville performer, but turned to driving and racing after winning a dirt-track motorcycle race at Crawfordsville, Indiana, in about 1904.

In 1908, Baker purchased an Indian motorcycle and began entering local races. His most famous victory came in 1909 at the first race ever held at the newly built Indianapolis Motor Speedway. He became the first NASCAR Commissioner in 1947. Baker was inducted into the Indianapolis Motor Speedway Hall of Fame in 1981, the Motorsports Hall of Fame of America in 1989, and the American Motorcyclist Association Motorcycle Hall of Fame in 1998.

Baker was also famous for his record-setting point-to-point drives, in which he was paid to promote the products of various motorcycle and automobile manufacturers. In all, he made 143 cross-country motorcycle speed runs totaling about 550,000 miles (890,000 km).

== Life ==
Baker was born in Dearborn County, Indiana, possibly in the community of Weisburg, in 1882. In January 1912, he left Indianapolis on a two-speed Indian motorcycle and covered 14,000 miles (23,000 km) in three months, traveling through Central and South America. He then traveled to San Diego where he based himself until he completed the first timed motorcycle crossing from San Diego to New York in 1914. This achievement led to being given the nickname "Cannon Ball" from a New York newspaper writer who compared him to the Cannonball Express train of the Illinois Central made famous by Casey Jones.

== Records ==
Baker set 143 driving records from the 1910s through the 1930s. His first was set in 1914, riding coast to coast on an Indian motorcycle in 11 days. He normally rode to sponsor manufacturers, guaranteeing them "no record, no money".

In 1915, Baker drove from Los Angeles to New York City in 11 days, 7 hours and 15 minutes in a Stutz Bearcat.

In 1916, Baker drove a Cadillac 8 roadster from Los Angeles to Times Square in 7 days, 11 hours, and 52 minutes, while accompanied by an Indianapolis newspaper reporter. For ReVere, he drove a car that might have been the first work's prototype vehicle on a very extended reliability, endurance, and promotion run. The trip took about four months from June to September 1918, went over 16,234 miles, and connected the 48 state capitals.

In 1924, Baker made his first midwinter transcontinental run in a stock Gardner sedan at a time of 4 days, 14 hours, and 15 minutes. Baker then purchased the vehicle after the completion of the run.

In 1928, Baker beat the 20th Century Limited train from New York to Chicago. Also in 1928, he competed in the Mount Washington Hillclimb Auto Race, and set a record time of 14:49.6 seconds, driving a Franklin.

In 1933, Baker completed his New York City to Los Angeles trek in a Graham-Paige model 57 Blue Streak 8, setting a 53.5 hour record that stood for 30 years until in 1964, using modern Interstate Highways, a tiny Hillman Imp crossed the country in 48 hours. These drives inspired the later Cannonball Baker Sea-to-Shining-Sea Memorial Trophy Dash, better known as the "Cannonball Run", which itself inspired at least five movies and a television series.

In 1941, Baker drove a new Crosley Covered Wagon across the nation in a trouble free 6,517-mile (10,488 km) run to prove the economy and reliability characteristics of Crosley automobiles. Other record and near-record transcontinental trips were made in Model T Fords, Chrysler Imperials, Marmons, Falcon-Knights, and Columbia Tigers, among others.

== Death ==
Baker died of a heart attack at Community Hospital in Indianapolis, Indiana, on May 10, 1960, at age 78. He is buried at Crown Hill Cemetery and Arboretum in Section 60, Lot 150 (39.8242284°N 86.1764395°W) in Indianapolis.

== Historical marker ==
In 2017, an Indiana state historical marker commemorating "Cannon Ball" Baker was installed by the Indiana Historical Bureau in front of Baker's home at 902 East Garfield Drive in Indianapolis. The home overlooks Garfield Park.

== Car and Driver "Cannonball Run" ==
In the 1970s, Car and Driver magazine reporter Brock Yates and editor Steve Smith conceived the idea of an unsanctioned, informal race across the country, replicating the 53.5-hour transcontinental drive made by Baker in 1933, as well as the more recent 1964 48-hour-dash of a tiny Hillman Imp. The New York to Los Angeles Cannonball Baker Sea-to-Shining-Sea Memorial Trophy Dash, later shortened to the "Cannonball Run", was staged in 1971, 1972, 1975, and 1979. The stunt served as the inspiration for several Hollywood movies, such as Cannonball!, The Gumball Rally, The Cannonball Run, Cannonball Run II, and Cannonball Run III.

== Motorsports career results ==
=== Indianapolis 500 results ===
Year	Car	Start	Qual	Rank	Finish	Laps	Led	Retired
1922	3	16	89.600	20	11	200	0	Running
Totals						200	0	

Starts	1
Poles	0
Front Row	0
Wins	0
Top 5	0
Top 10	0
Retired	0

== See also ==
- NASCAR National Commissioner
