= Lingenfelter Performance Engineering =

American automotive engineering manufacturer

- Type: private
- Industry: Automotive
- Founded: 1973
- Founder: John Lingenfelter
- Headquarters: Brighton, Michigan, United States
- Key people: Ken Lingenfelter (Owner)
- Products: High performance vehicles
- Website: www.lingenfelter.com

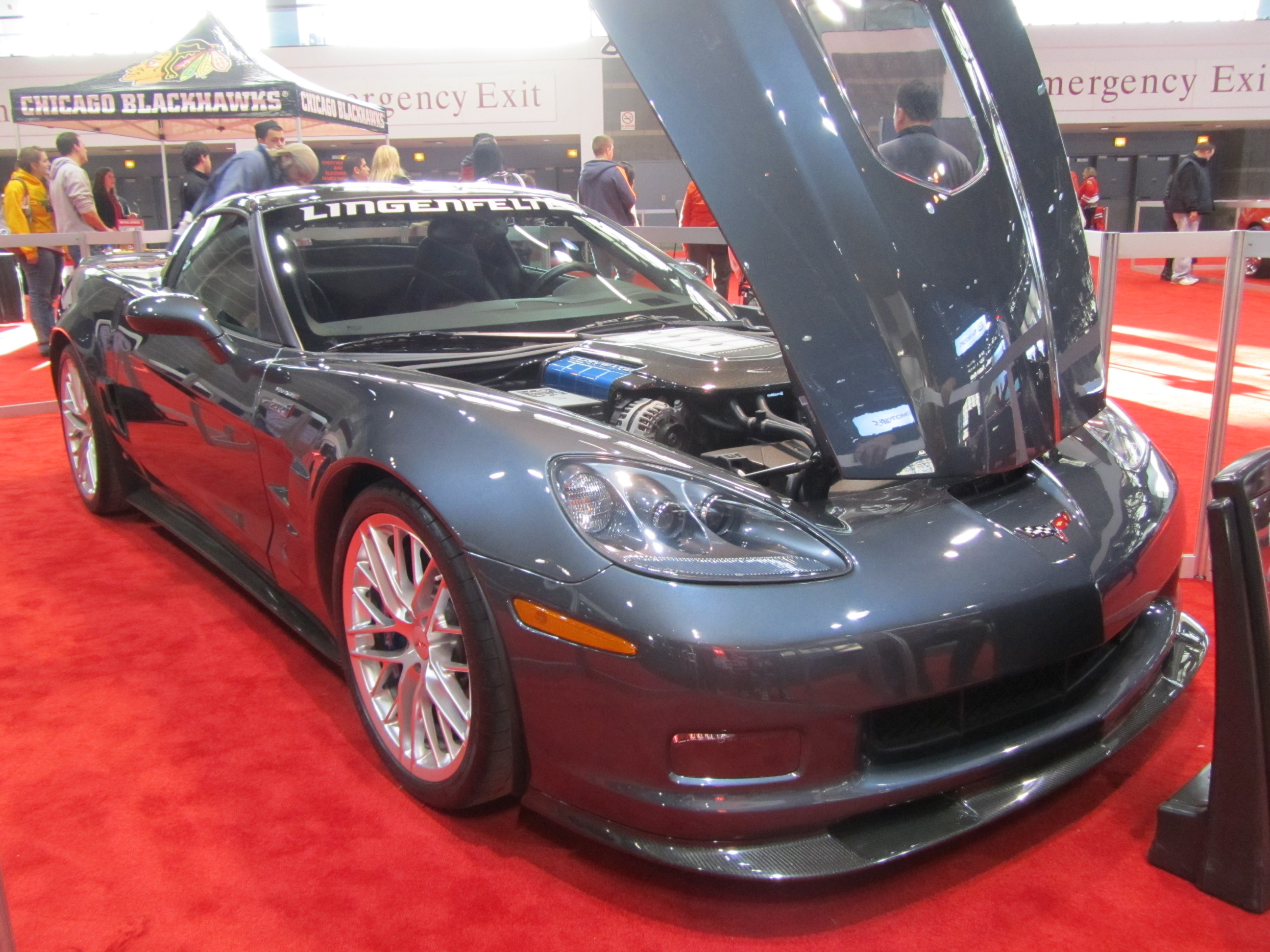
2009 Lingenfelter C6 ZR1 at the 2011 Chicago Auto Show

Lingenfelter Performance Engineering (LPE) (also known as Lingenfelter) is an American automotive engineering manufacturer specializing in high-performance automobile modifications, mainly engine blocks, intercooling, transmissions, exhaust pipes, valvetrains, suspension, brakes, pistons, camshafts, and supercharging, Now headquartered in Brighton, Michigan, the brand was founded by and named for NHRA driver John Lingenfelter in Decatur, IN. Since its founding, LPE has created high-performance versions of many GM vehicles, such as the F-Bodies (Camaro, Firebird), B Bodies (Impala SS, Caprice, Roadmaster, Fleetwood), Corvette, CTS-V, GTO, Silverado, Suburban, Tahoe, Escalade, Denali, SSR, Hummer H2, and Sierra. Furthermore, it has also created performance enhancement packages for Stellantis and Ford vehicles like the Dodge Viper, Challenger, Charger, Mustang, F150 and Plymouth Prowler.

In January 1998, MotorTrend tested a Chevrolet Tahoe modified and tuned by Lingenfelter, powered by a 396 (6.5L) cubic inch Chevrolet V8 and reached a 5.1-second 0-60 mph time as well as a 0.9g lateral acceleration ratio. The SUV completed the quarter mile in 13.8 seconds at 96 mph. Those numbers matched the performance figures of a stock C4 Corvette model and GMC Syclones/Typhoons of that year. Motor Trend also tested an LPE-built Impala SS that had the same 0-60 mph time (4.7 seconds) as the last generation M5 due to its bored and stroked LT-1 (displacement rose to 383 in^{3} and horsepower rose to 425). Another LPE vehicle was featured in the June 1996 issue of Car and Driver: A modified C4 Corvette with a 427.6 in^{3} engine that reached a top speed of 212 mph (ca. 341 km/h) . LPE's 2001 Corvette 427 twin-turbo with 800 rear-wheel horsepower completed a 0-60 mph acceleration in 1.97 seconds. Another LPE vehicle that the company developed and marketed to customers was a 2006 twin-turbo Corvette Z06 with 1,109 rear wheel horsepower.
