= 2010 AAA 400 =

Race details
- Race 28 of 36 in the 2010 NASCAR Sprint Cup Series
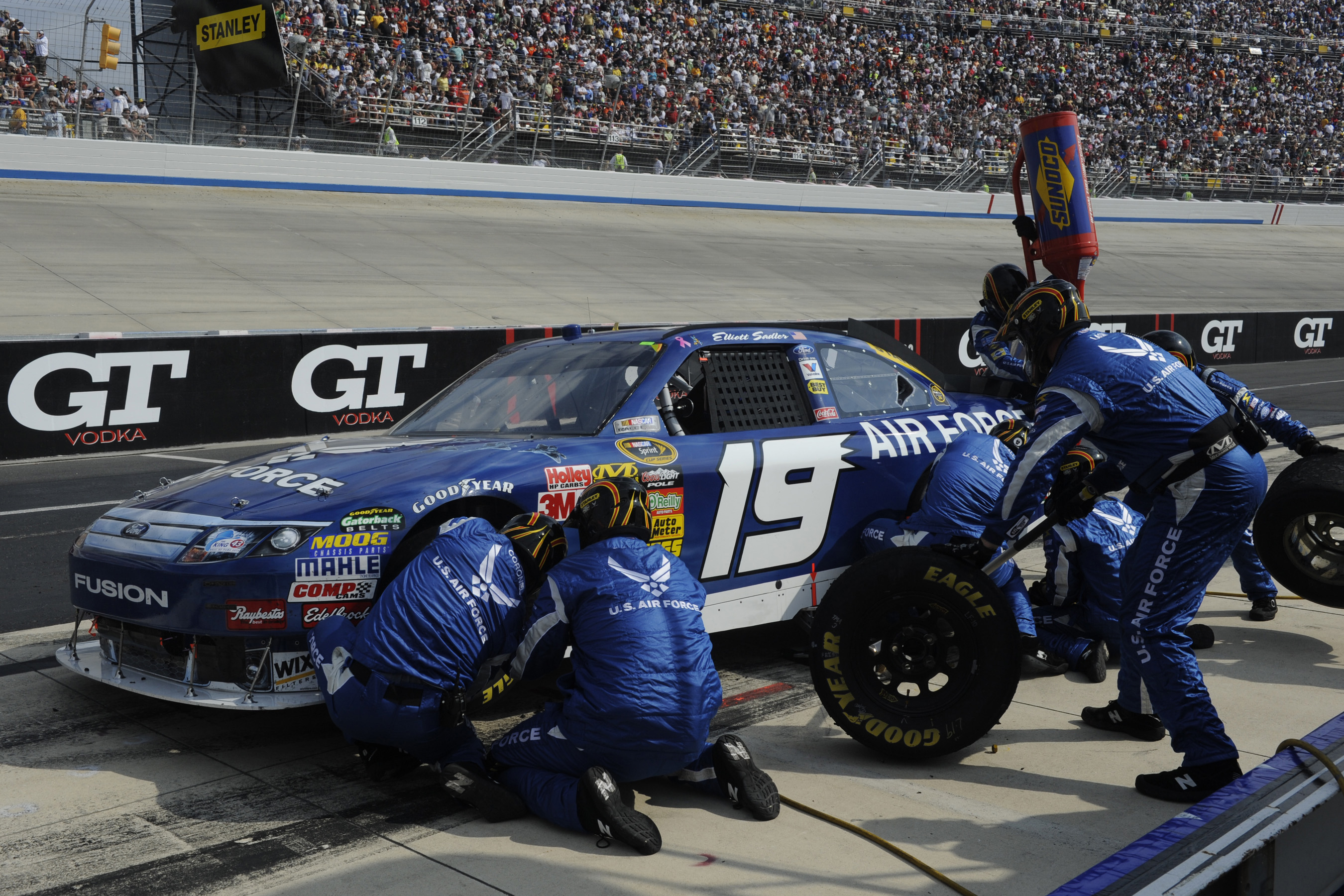
- Car 19 pitting during the race
- Date: September 26, 2010
- Location: Dover International Speedway, Dover, Delaware
- Course: Permanent racing facility
- Course length: 1.0 miles (1.6 km)
- Distance: 400 laps, 400 mi (643.737 km)
- Weather: Showers with a high of 73; wind out of the ENE at 14 mph. There is a 40 percent chance of precipitation on race day.
- Average speed: 131.543 miles per hour (211.698 km/h)

Pole position
Driver	Jimmie Johnson	Hendrick Motorsports
- Time: 23.116

Most laps led
Driver	Jimmie Johnson	Hendrick Motorsports
- Laps: 191

Winner
No. 48	Jimmie Johnson	Hendrick Motorsports

Television in the United States
- Network: ESPN
- Announcers: Marty Reid, Dale Jarrett and Andy Petree

The 2010 AAA 400 was a NASCAR Sprint Cup Series race held on September 26, 2010, at Dover International Speedway in Dover, Delaware. The 400 lap race was the twenty-eighth in the 2010 NASCAR Sprint Cup Series, as well as the second race in the ten-race Chase for the Sprint Cup, which ends the season. The race was won by Jimmie Johnson, of the Hendrick Motorsports team. Jeff Burton finished second, and Joey Logano, who started nineteenth, clinched third.

Pole position driver Jimmie Johnson maintained his lead on the first lap to begin the race, as A. J. Allmendinger, who started in the second position on the grid, remained behind him. Fourteen laps later Allmendinger became the leader of the race. Chase for the Sprint Cup participants Clint Bowyer, and Tony Stewart were in the top ten for most of the race, but in the closing laps all of them suffered spins or other problems. Afterward, Johnson became the leader of the race, once Allmendinger made a pit stop because of a loose wheel. Johnson maintained the first position to lead the most laps of 191, and to win his sixth race of the season.

There were four cautions and eighteen lead changes among ten different drivers throughout the course of the race. It was Jimmie Johnson's sixth win in the 2010 season, and the fifty-third of his career. The result moved Johnson up to second in the Drivers' Championship, thirty-five points behind Denny Hamlin and ten ahead of Kyle Busch. Chevrolet maintained its lead in the Manufacturers' Championship, thirty-five ahead of Toyota and eighty ahead of Ford, with eight races remaining in the season. A total of 88,000 people attended the race, while 3.966 million watched it on television.

== Report ==
=== Background ===
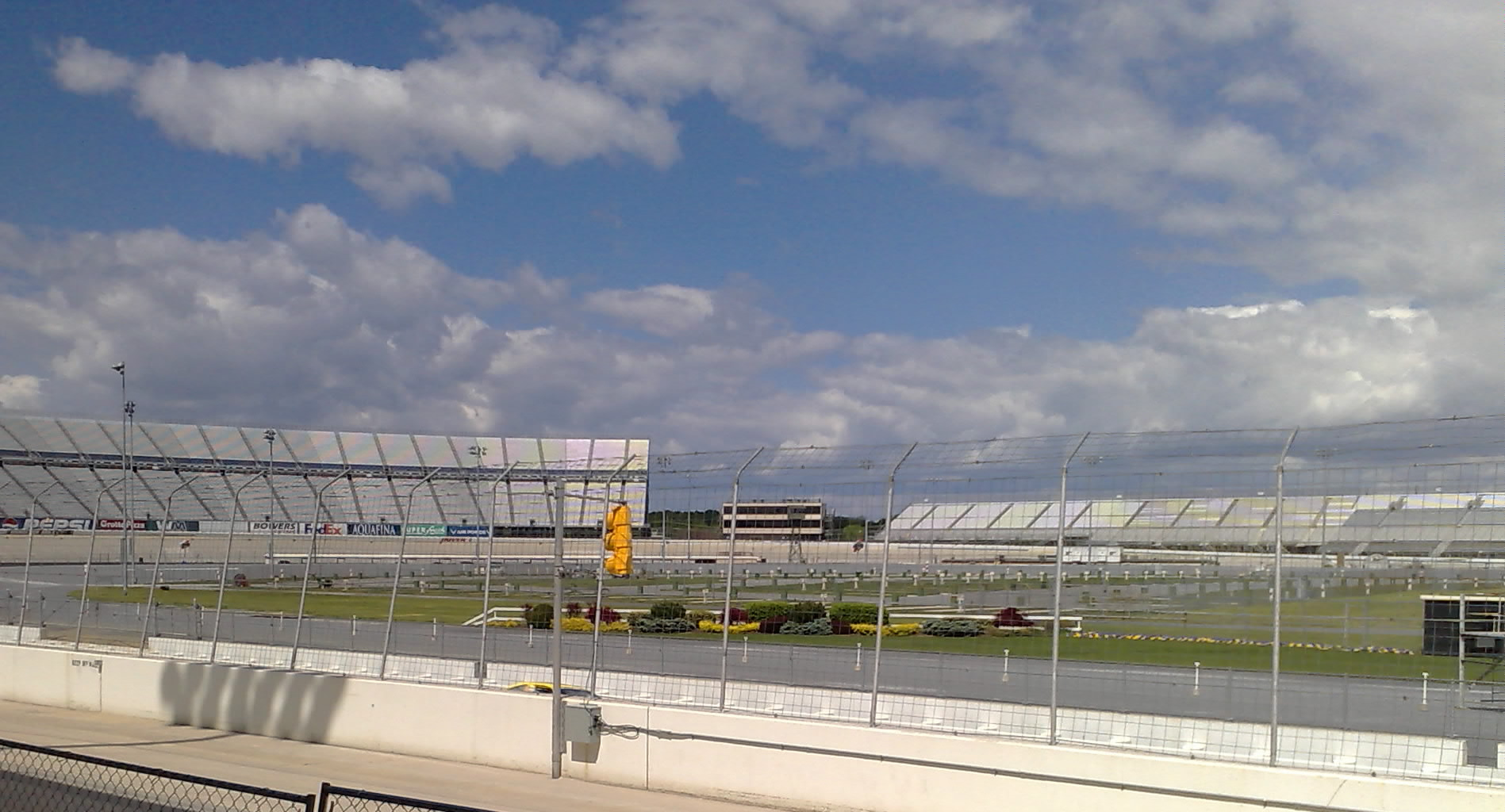
Dover International Speedway, the race track where the race was held.

Dover International Speedway is one of five short tracks to hold NASCAR races. The NASCAR race makes use of the track's standard configuration, a four-turn short track oval that is 1 mile (1.6 km) long. The track's turns are banked at twenty-four degrees. The front stretch, the location of the finish line, is banked at nine degrees with the backstretch. The racetrack has seats for 135,000 spectators.

Before the race, Denny Hamlin led the Drivers' Championship with 5,230 points, and Kevin Harvick stood in second with 5,185. Kyle Busch was third in the Drivers' Championship with 5,168, thirteen ahead of Jeff Gordon and twenty-four ahead of Kurt Busch in fourth and fifth. Jimmie Johnson with 5,138 was three points ahead of Carl Edwards, as Greg Biffle with 5,122 points, was four ahead of Jeff Burton, and sixteen in front of Tony Stewart. Matt Kenseth and Clint Bowyer was eleventh and twelfth with 5,094 and 5,045 points. In the Manufacturers' Championship, Chevrolet was leading with 197 points, thirty-two points ahead of their rival Toyota. Ford, with 123 points, was fourteen points ahead of Dodge in the battle for third. Jimmie Johnson was the race's defending champion.

=== Practice and qualifying ===
Three practice sessions were held before the Sunday race—one on Friday, and two on Saturday. The first session lasted 90 minutes, while the second session lasted 45 minutes. The third and final session lasted 60 minutes. During the first practice session, Ryan Newman, for the Stewart–Haas Racing team, was quickest ahead of Carl Edwards in second and Kasey Kahne in the third position. Clint Bowyer was scored fourth and Greg Biffle managed fifth. Matt Kenseth, Kyle Busch, A. J. Allmendinger, Mark Martin, and Jeff Gordon rounded out the top ten quickest drivers in the session.

Forty-five cars were entered for qualifying, but only forty-three could race because of NASCAR's qualifying procedure. Jimmie Johnson clinched his twenty-fifth pole position in the Sprint Cup Series, with a time of 23.116 seconds. He was joined on the front row of the grid by A. J. Allmendinger. Mark Martin qualified third, Martin Truex Jr. took fourth, and Denny Hamlin started fifth. Tony Stewart, one of the drivers in the Chase for the Sprint Cup, qualified twenty-sixth, while Kevin Harvick was scored thirty-fourth.

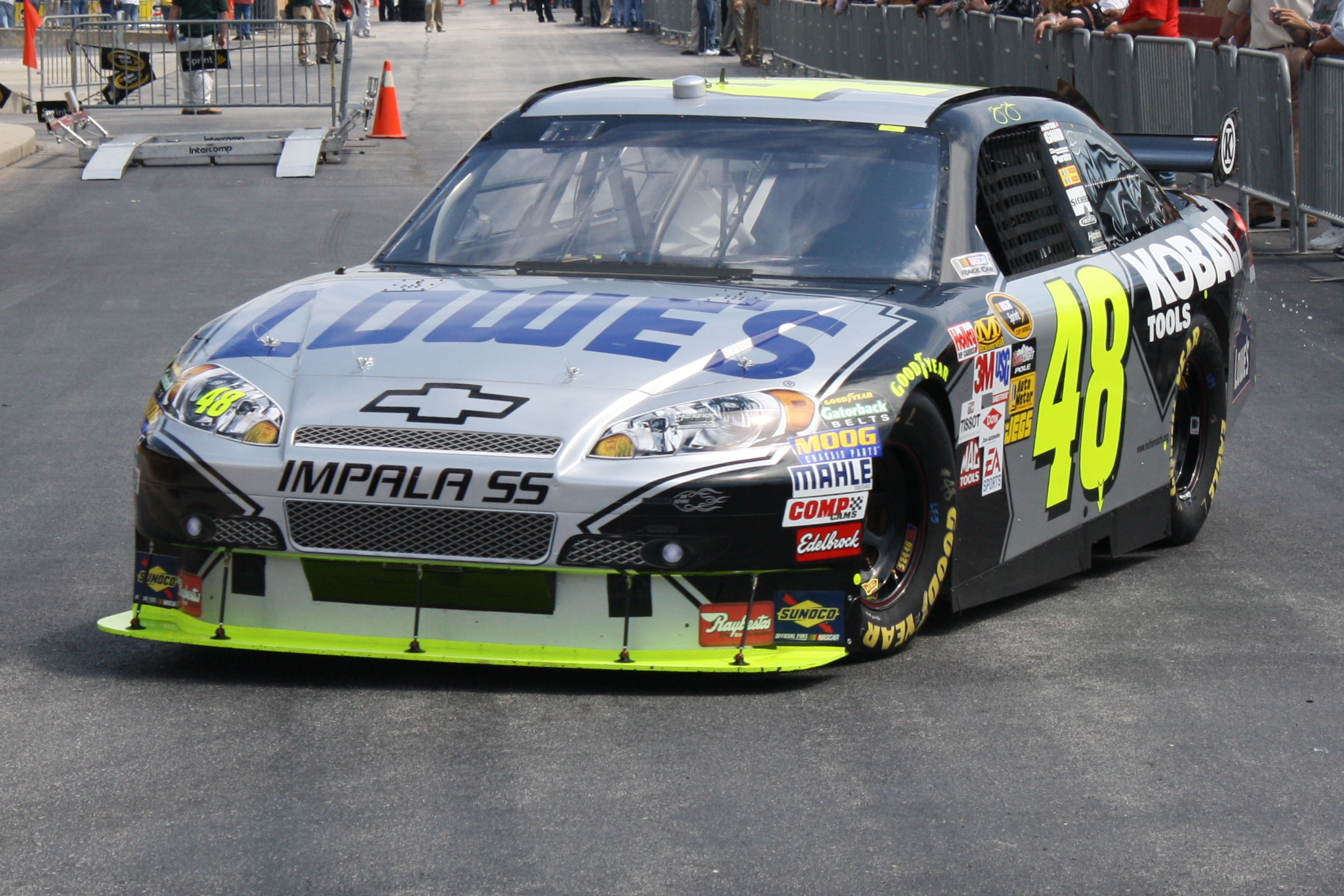
Jimmie Johnson won the pole position, after having a fastest time of 23.116 seconds.

The three drivers that failed to qualify for the race were Ted Musgrave, Josh Wise, and Jeff Green. Once the qualifying session ended, Johnson said, "This is certainly a step in the right direction for momentum. Last weekend, we ran much better than where we finished. It stinks that we finished where we did, but there is nothing we can really do about it." Mark Martin, who originally qualified third, started forty-second, after having his time disallowed where the right rear shock exceeded the maximum allowable gas pressure.

On the next morning, David Reutimann was quickest in the second practice session, ahead of Kyle Busch and Kurt Busch in second and third. Juan Pablo Montoya was fourth quickest, and Jimmie Johnson took fifth. Greg Biffle, Clint Bowyer, Jamie McMurray, Jeff Burton, and Jeff Gordon followed in the top-ten. Other drivers in the chase, such as Carl Edwards, was twentieth, and Kevin Harvick, who was twenty-sixth. During the third, and final practice session, Joey Logano, with a fastest time of 23.802, was quickest. Clint Bowyer and Jeff Burton followed in second and third with times of 23.844 and 23.851 seconds. Matt Kenseth managed to be fourth fastest, ahead of Martin Truex Jr. and Marcos Ambrose. Denny Hamlin was scored seventh, Jimmie Johnson took eighth, A. J. Allmendinger was ninth, and Brad Keselowski.

During the third practice session, Denny Hamlin and Kevin Harvick collided with each other. Once they both drove to the garage, they were talking out of anger from the comments that Denny Hamlin had about Clint Bowyer's penalty after New Hampshire. Once the argument ended, Denny Hamlin stated, "There really was just a lot of cursing. That's all that was being said. There was really nothing logical being said between the two teams." Richard Childress, the owner of the Bowyer's racecar, commented, "When you're talking about comments, you can't win a pissing match with a skunk. There are two things I've learned. One thing is that. The other is that you don't throw stones if you live in a glass house." Afterward, Robin Pemberton commented about the collision by saying, "They just got together in practice, and that's fine. Sometimes you get together in practice like that."

=== Race ===
The race, the twenty-eighth out of a total of thirty-six in the season, began at 1:00 p.m. EDT and was televised live in the United States on ESPN. Prior to the race, weather conditions were partly cloudy with the air temperature around 70 °F (21 °C). Dan Schafer, pastor of Calvary Assembly of God in Hightstown, New Jersey, began pre-race ceremonies, by giving the invocation. Next, Mercury recording artist Jessie James performed the national anthem, and Marke Dickinson, senior vice president of American Automobile Association, gave the command for drivers to start their engines.

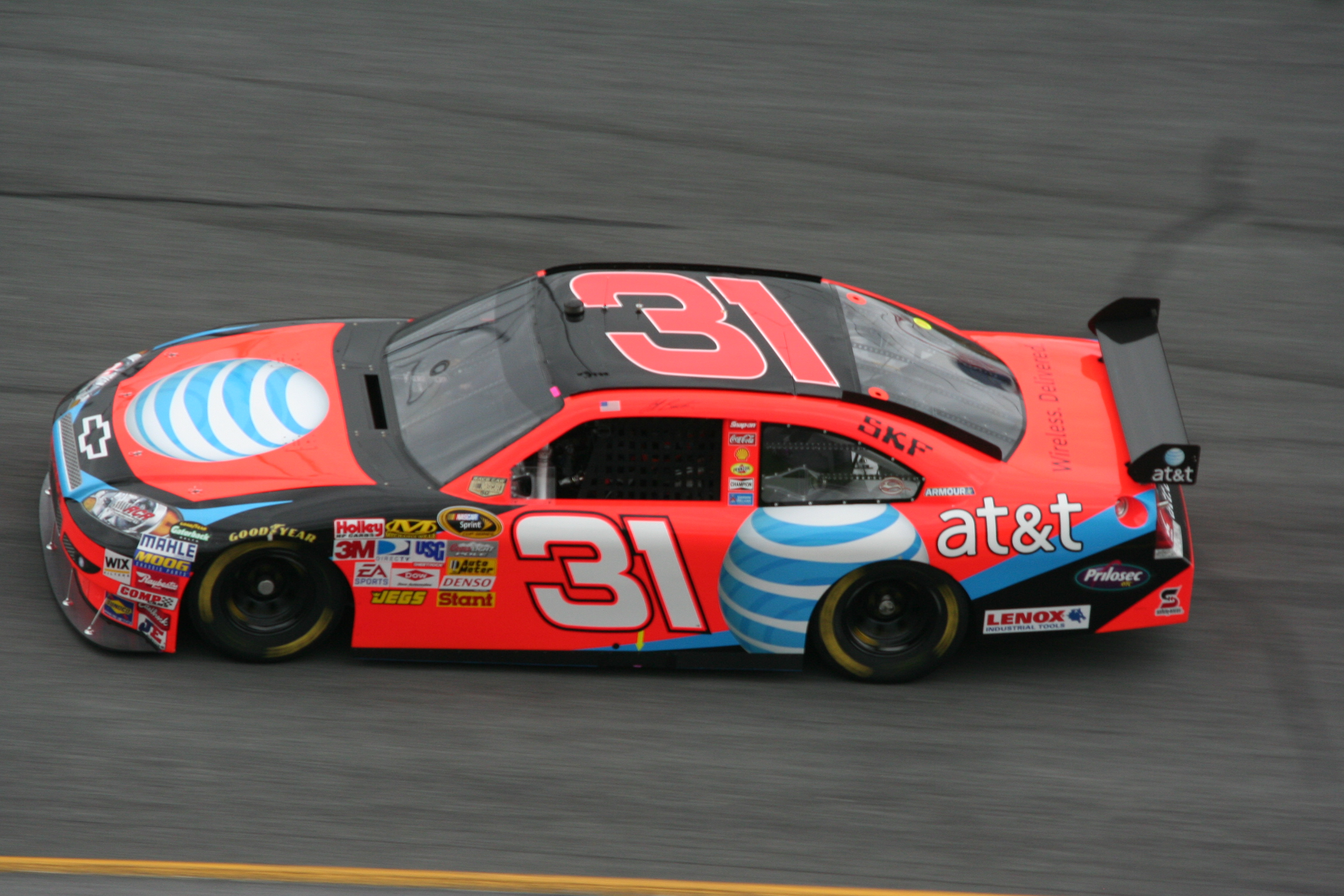
Jeff Burton managed to gain twenty-five positions to finish second in the race.

Jimmie Johnson retained his pole position lead into the first corner, followed by A. J. Allmendinger in the second position. Denny Hamlin, who started fourth, had fallen into fifth by the second lap. One lap later, Juan Pablo Montoya moved into fourth, as Ryan Newman emerged in twelfth. After the seventh lap, Johnson remained in first, as Jeff Gordon moved into thirteenth. Allmendinger emerged in first after passing Johnson on lap 14. Mark Martin had gained the most positions, with eleven, by the eighteenth lap. On lap 23, Allmendinger remained the leader ahead of Johnson and Martin Truex Jr. Allmendinger began putting other drivers a lap behind by lap 24, with Mike Bliss. After 28 consecutive laps under the green flag, Allmendinger was 1.2 second ahead of Johnson in the second position. Joe Nemechek was put a lap down on lap 31; Bobby Labonte followed Nemechek six laps later.

Allmendinger's lead of 1.2 seconds was reduced to nothing when the pace car was on track for the first caution. It was given because a cover for one of a caution light's cover had loosened. When the drivers made pit stops, Allmendinger remained the leader, but Johnson lost three positions, falling to fifth. Tony Stewart was the only team to change only two tires, which resulted him to move toward the front of the grid. However, once the race resumed he was losing positions quickly. Gordon, who started fifteenth, had gained seven positions to eighth by lap 47. The second caution followed three laps later because David Reutimann collided into the wall after contact from Newman. Reutimann's car sustained only minor damages. Kevin Harvick went to pit road under the caution, in which afterward his rear tire changer fell and hurt his wrist. Allmendinger led on the restart, ahead of Martin Truex Jr. in second. On lap 61, Montoya moved into the third position after passing Greg Biffle.

Johnson followed Montoya, by passing Biffle one lap later for fourth. After the sixty-sixth lap, Allmendinger had led more laps in the race so far than his 107 previous starts. Joey Logano, after starting nineteenth had moved to twelfth by lap 68. Five laps later, Hamlin fell to the eighth position. Stewart, who chose only two tire changes on his first pit stop, had fallen to twentieth after eighty laps. By lap 85, Allmendinger had a 2.9 second lead over Martin Truex Jr. Afterward, Scott Speed was put a lap down and Kurt Busch moved to the fifth spot. On lap 93, Johnson emerged in second after passing Montoya and Truex. Five laps later, Casey Mears went a lap down after Allmendinger passed him. After 104 laps, Carl Edwards rounded out the top-ten positions.

Eight laps later, Allmendinger began green flag pit stops. Truex became the new leader, followed by Logano, Reed Sorenson, and Labonte. On lap 122, Allmendinger reclaimed the first position and extended his lead to over five seconds. On lap 138, Edwards moved to ninth while Truex remained second. Montoya maintained the seventh position until 145, when Edwards passed him. After 147 laps, Hamlin was running in sixth, and Jeff Gordon was tenth. By lap 155, Allmendinger had a 4.3 lead over second place. Clint Bowyer collided with the wall three laps later, and only sustained side damage. On lap 162, Johnson claimed the second position from Truex. Ten laps later, Johnson reclaimed the lead after Allmendinger fell to 27th while making a pit stop. On lap 186, the third caution was given when Matt Kenseth gathered damage from a flat tire because of missing the entrance of pit road. Johnson maintained the first position under the pit stops, ahead of Truex and Kyle Busch. One lap later, Gordon moved into third, as Hamlin fell to sixth.

On lap 202, Kyle Busch reclaimed third away from Gordon. Truex had a loose wheel after pit stops, resulting in him coming to pit road. Once his pit stop completed, his rear axle broke. Edwards, then, passed Gordon for fifth, as Jeff Burton moved into fourth. On lap 219, Gordon had fallen to sixth while his teammate Jimmie Johnson had led sixty-four laps to this point in the race. After 230 laps, there were only nineteen drivers on the same lap as Johnson. Five laps later, Edwards passed Jeff Burton to move into fourth. Afterward, Paul Menard passed Jamie McMurray for the tenth position. By the 249th lap, Johnson had a 3.21 second lead, ahead of Kyle Busch, who collided with the wall once lap later. On lap 266, another set of green flag pit stops began. Afterward, Johnson led Kyle Busch by 1.95 seconds. On lap 290, debris prompted the fourth caution of the race. Kyle Busch passed Johnson during pit stops to lead on the restart.

Two laps later, Logano passed Johnson for the second position. On lap 299, Kyle Busch had a 1.36 second lead over second place. Three laps later, Paul Menard moved into the seventh position while Kurt Busch challenged Jeff Burton for fourth. Johnson then moved into second after passing Logano on lap 320. Less than five laps later, Kevin Harvick complained to his crew about his car handling problems. Allmendinger, after his unscheduled pit stop earlier in the race, had moved up to tenth by lap 330. Seven laps later, Johnson reclaimed the first position from Kyle Busch. Afterward, Jeff Burton moved into the third position. Burton, then passed Kyle Busch for second seven laps later. By the 349th lap, Johnson has a 1.23 second lead over Burton, as Harvick made a pit stop. On lap 360, more green flag pit stops began, as Hamlin and Gordon made pit stops. Three laps later, Johnson made a pit stop, giving the lead to Edwards who subsequently made a pit stop himself, returning the lead to Johnson. On lap 371, McMurray moved into eleventh after Sam Hornish Jr.'s car ignited on pit road. Johnson had a lead of 2.37 seconds over Burton after pit stops ended. Jimmie Johnson maintained the lead to win his sixth race of the 2010 season. Jeff Burton finished second, ahead of Joey Logano in third and Kurt Busch in fourth. Carl Edwards clinched the fifth position, after starting tenth.

=== Post-race ===
"Obviously it was the weekend we would dream of. We got the pole, led the most laps and won the race. I had a great car and everybody did their jobs today. I was very pleased with the effort and it came at a good time obviously. We’ve got eight [races] to go and we’ll see where it goes from here."

— Jimmie Johnson, speaking after the race.

Jimmie Johnson appeared in victory lane after his victory lap to start celebrating his sixth win of the season, in front of a crowd of 88,000 people. Afterward, his crew chief, Chad Knaus said, "We really had our hands full this weekend." He continued with, "We came in qualifying trim, and as we unloaded, the car wasn’t reacting the way we anticipated. So we had to make some pretty significant changes, and when it came time to qualify, we had to put a setup under there that Jimmie hadn’t felt yet. For race practice, we weren’t where we needed to be then either. Honestly, we could adjust the car and make it do some different things, but we couldn’t really make the car better. The difference today was definitely the driver."

"It was a mediocre day. I hate that we didn’t run better, but we got close to where we wanted to be leaving Dover. It’s frustrating that we still can’t get a grasp on this race track and didn’t run as well as we did in the spring. But if you told me I’d be taking a 35 point lead out of Dover, I’d take it," said ninth-place finisher, Denny Hamlin. Next, Jeff Burton, who finished second, said:

"We thought we had a really good car coming into the race today. We took off and struggled a little bit with rear grip, and worked all day to get the grip level right. About halfway through that next to last run, my car got really happy and took off. I’m proud of us for getting the car right at the right time. About 15 laps into that next to last run, Jimmie cleared Logano and got really fast. He was just a little quicker than we were today."

Hamlin maintained the Drivers' championship lead with 5,368 points. Johnson stood in second, thirty five points behind Hamlin, and ten ahead of Kyle Busch. Kurt Busch, after finishing fourth in the race, remained in the fourth position with 5,309 points. Kevin Harvick was fifth, as Carl Edwards, Burton, Jeff Gordon, Greg Biffle, and Tony Stewart followed in the top-ten positions. The final two positions available in the Chase for the Sprint Cup was occupied with Matt Kenseth in eleventh and Clint Bowyer in twelfth. In the Manufacturers' Championship, Chevrolet maintained their lead with 206 points. Toyota remained second with 171 points. Ford followed with 126 points, thirteen points ahead of Dodge in fourth. 3.966 million people watched the race on television. The race took three hours, two minutes and twenty-seven seconds to complete, and the margin of victory was 2.637 seconds.

== Results ==
=== Qualifying ===
Grid	No	Driver	Team	Manufacturer	Time	Speed
1	48	Jimmie Johnson	Hendrick Motorsports	Chevrolet	23.116	155.736
2	43	A. J. Allmendinger	Richard Petty Motorsports	Ford	23.130	155.642
3	56	Martin Truex Jr.	Michael Waltrip Racing	Toyota	23.173	155.353
4	11	Denny Hamlin	Joe Gibbs Racing	Toyota	23.178	155.320
5	42	Juan Pablo Montoya	Earnhardt Ganassi Racing	Chevrolet	23.218	155.052
6	16	Greg Biffle	Roush Fenway Racing	Ford	23.221	155.032
7	1	Jamie McMurray	Earnhardt Ganassi Racing	Chevrolet	23.221	155.032
8	2	Kurt Busch	Penske Racing	Dodge	23.252	154.825
9	98	Paul Menard	Richard Petty Motorsports	Ford	23.261	154.766
10	99	Carl Edwards	Roush Fenway Racing	Ford	23.271	154.699
11	18	Kyle Busch	Joe Gibbs Racing	Toyota	23.283	154.619
12	83	Reed Sorenson	Red Bull Racing Team	Toyota	23.283	154.619
13	39	Ryan Newman	Stewart Haas Racing	Chevrolet	23.287	154.593
14	17	Matt Kenseth	Roush Fenway Racing	Ford	23.296	154.533
15	24	Jeff Gordon	Hendrick Motorsports	Chevrolet	23.298	154.520
16	9	Kasey Kahne	Richard Petty Motorsports	Ford	23.314	154.414
17	00	David Reutimann	Michael Waltrip Racing	Toyota	23.321	154.367
18	78	Regan Smith	Furniture Row Racing	Chevrolet	23.324	154.348
19	20	Joey Logano	Joe Gibbs Racing	Toyota	23.342	154.228
20	82	Scott Speed	Red Bull Racing Team	Toyota	23.358	154.123
21	77	Sam Hornish Jr.	Penske Racing	Dodge	23.364	154.083
22	19	Elliott Sadler	Richard Petty Motorsports	Ford	23.371	154.037
23	47	Marcos Ambrose	JTG Daugherty Racing	Toyota	23.374	154.017
24	33	Clint Bowyer	Richard Childress Racing	Chevrolet	23.377	153.997
25	14	Tony Stewart	Stewart Haas Racing	Chevrolet	23.416	153.741
26	13	Casey Mears	Germain Racing	Toyota	23.419	153.721
27	31	Jeff Burton	Richard Childress Racing	Chevrolet	23.425	153.682
28	87	Joe Nemechek	NEMCO Motorsports	Toyota	23.428	153.662
29	6	David Ragan	Roush Fenway Racing	Ford	23.429	153.656
30	34	Travis Kvapil	Front Row Motorsports	Ford	23.480	153.322
31	12	Brad Keselowski	Penske Racing	Dodge	23.483	153.302
32	88	Dale Earnhardt Jr.	Hendrick Motorsports	Chevrolet	23.497	153.211
33	29	Kevin Harvick	Richard Childress Racing	Chevrolet	23.522	153.048
34	09	Bobby Labonte	Phoenix Racing	Chevrolet	23.531	152.990
35	38	David Gilliland	Front Row Motorsports	Ford	23.536	152.957
36	81	J. J. Yeley	Whitney Motorsports	Dodge	23.538	152.944
37	36	Dave Blaney	Tommy Baldwin Racing	Chevrolet	23.597	152.562
38	55	Mike Bliss	Prism Motorsports	Toyota	23.617	152.433
39	71	Landon Cassill	TRG Motorsports	Chevrolet	23.629	152.355
40	7	Kevin Conway	Robby Gordon Motorsports	Toyota	23.952	150.301
41	37	Tony Raines	Front Row Motorsports	Ford	24.048	149.701
42	5	Mark Martin	Hendrick Motorsports	Chevrolet	23.142	155.561
43	46	Michael McDowell	Whitney Motorsports	Dodge	23.716	151.796
Failed to qualify
	26	Jeff Green	Latitude 43 Motorsports	Ford	23.735	151.675
	64	Josh Wise	Gunselman Motorsports	Toyota	23.913	150.546
	66	Ted Musgrave	Prism Motorsports	Toyota	24.083	149.483

=== Race results ===
Pos	Grid	Car	Driver	Team	Manufacturer	Laps Run	Points
1	1	48	Jimmie Johnson	Hendrick Motorsports	Chevrolet	400	195^{2}
2	27	31	Jeff Burton	Richard Childress Racing	Chevrolet	400	170
3	19	20	Joey Logano	Joe Gibbs Racing	Toyota	400	170^{1}
4	8	2	Kurt Busch	Penske Racing	Dodge	400	165^{1}
5	10	99	Carl Edwards	Roush Fenway Racing	Ford	400	160^{1}
6	11	18	Kyle Busch	Joe Gibbs Racing	Toyota	400	155^{1}
7	9	98	Paul Menard	Richard Petty Motorsports	Ford	400	146
8	13	39	Ryan Newman	Stewart Haas Racing	Chevrolet	400	142
9	4	11	Denny Hamlin	Joe Gibbs Racing	Toyota	400	138
10	2	43	A. J. Allmendinger	Richard Petty Motorsports	Ford	400	139^{1}
11	15	24	Jeff Gordon	Hendrick Motorsports	Chevrolet	400	130
12	42	5	Mark Martin	Hendrick Motorsports	Chevrolet	400	127
13	7	1	Jamie McMurray	Earnhardt Ganassi Racing	Chevrolet	400	124
14	5	42	Juan Pablo Montoya	Earnhardt Ganassi Racing	Chevrolet	400	121
15	33	29	Kevin Harvick	Richard Childress Racing	Chevrolet	400	118
16	12	83	Reed Sorenson	Red Bull Racing Team	Toyota	400	120^{1}
17	22	19	Elliott Sadler	Richard Petty Motorsports	Ford	400	112
18	14	17	Matt Kenseth	Roush Fenway Racing	Ford	400	109
19	6	16	Greg Biffle	Roush Fenway Racing	Ford	400	106
20	23	47	Marcos Ambrose	JTG Daugherty Racing	Toyota	400	103
21	25	14	Tony Stewart	Stewart Haas Racing	Chevrolet	398	100
22	31	12	Brad Keselowski	Penske Racing	Dodge	398	97
23	32	88	Dale Earnhardt Jr.	Hendrick Motorsports	Chevrolet	397	94
24	29	6	David Ragan	Roush Fenway Racing	Ford	397	91
25	24	33	Clint Bowyer	Richard Childress Racing	Chevrolet	397	88
26	18	78	Regan Smith	Furniture Row Racing	Chevrolet	397	85
27	34	09	Bobby Labonte	Phoenix Racing	Chevrolet	397	87^{1}
28	16	9	Kasey Kahne	Richard Petty Motorsports	Ford	396	79
29	26	13	Casey Mears	Germain Racing	Toyota	395	76
30	35	38	David Gilliland	Front Row Motorsports	Ford	395	78^{1}
31	41	37	Tony Raines	Front Row Motorsports	Ford	394	70
32	20	82	Scott Speed	Red Bull Racing Team	Toyota	393	67
33	30	34	Travis Kvapil	Front Row Motorsports	Ford	388	64
34	3	56	Martin Truex Jr.	Michael Waltrip Racing	Toyota	383	66^{1}
35	17	00	David Reutimann	Michael Waltrip Racing	Toyota	373	58
36	21	77	Sam Hornish Jr.	Penske Racing	Dodge	349	55
37	40	7	Kevin Conway	Robby Gordon Motorsports	Toyota	129	52
38	39	71	Landon Cassill	TRG Motorsports	Chevrolet	126	49
39	43	46	Michael McDowell	Whitney Motorsports	Dodge	71	46
40	38	55	Mike Bliss	Prism Motorsports	Toyota	60	43
41	28	87	Joe Nemechek	NEMCO Motorsports	Toyota	58	40
42	36	81	J. J. Yeley	Whitney Motorsports	Dodge	43	37
43	37	36	Dave Blaney	Tommy Baldwin Racing	Chevrolet	29	34
^{1} Includes five bonus points for leading a lap
^{2} Includes ten bonus points for leading the most laps

== Standings after the race ==
Drivers' Championship standings

Pos	Driver	Points
1	Denny Hamlin	5,368
2	Jimmie Johnson	5,333
3	Kyle Busch	5,323
4	Kurt Busch	5,309
5	Kevin Harvick	5,303
6	Carl Edwards	5,295
7	Jeff Burton	5,288
8	Jeff Gordon	5,285
9	Greg Biffle	5,228
10	Tony Stewart	5,206
11	Matt Kenseth	5,203
12	Clint Bowyer	5,130

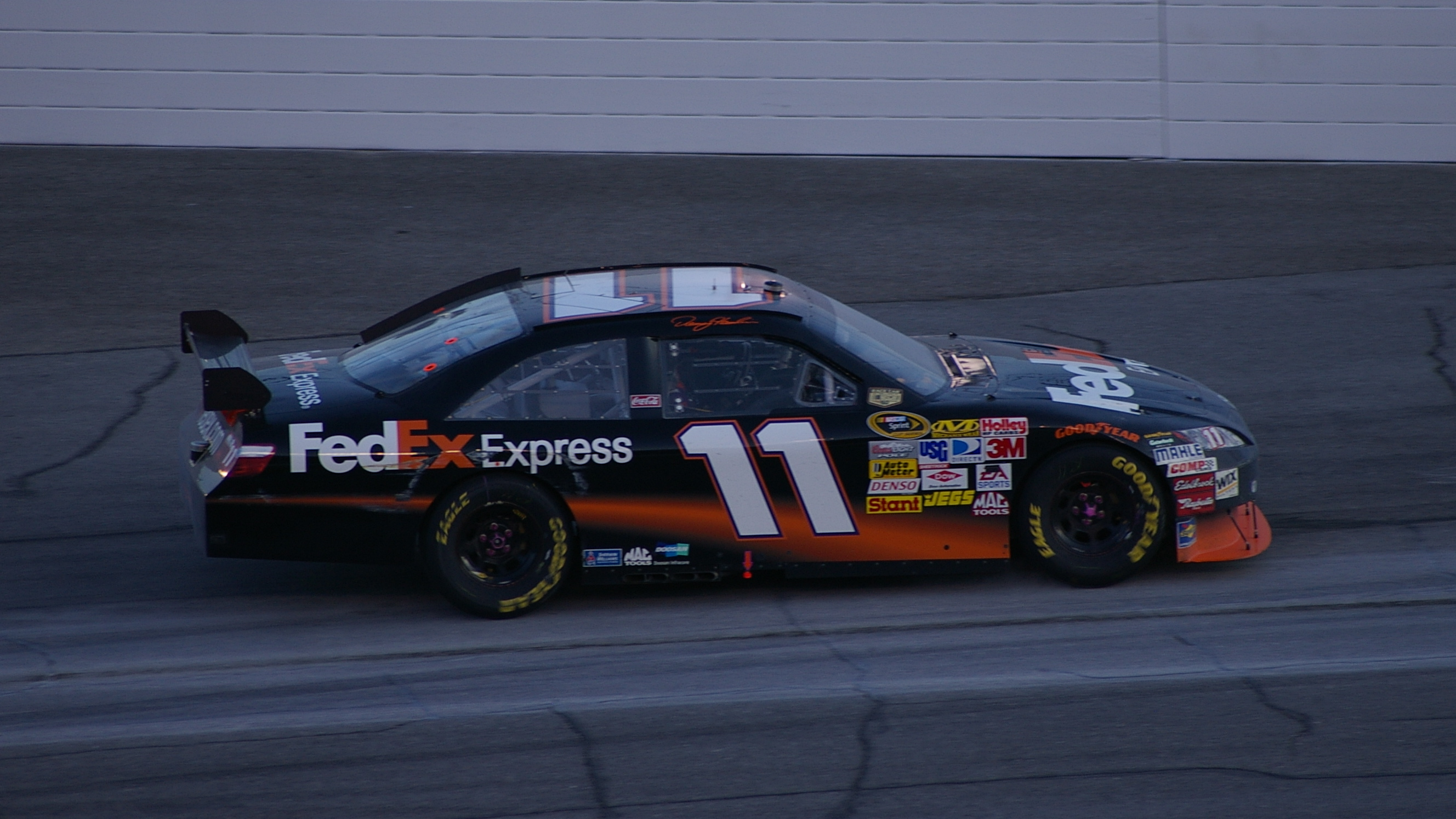
Denny Hamlin remained the points leader with 5,368 points, after finishing ninth in the race.

Manufacturers' Championship standings

Pos	Manufacturer	Points
1	Chevrolet	206
2	Toyota	171
3	Ford	126
4	Dodge	113

- Note: Only the top twelve positions are included for the driver standings. These drivers qualified for the Chase for the Sprint Cup.

Previous race: 2010 Sylvania 300	Sprint Cup Series; 2010 season	Next race: 2010 Price Chopper 400
