= John Lingenfelter =

American racing driver (born 1945)

John Earl Lingenfelter (October 6, 1945 in East Freedom, Pennsylvania – December 25, 2003 in Decatur, Indiana) was an NHRA driver, engineer and tuner.

Over his career, Lingenfelter won 13 national events in Competition Eliminator and was the first driver in the class to break the six-second quarter-mile barrier. He finished second in the Pro Stock Truck standings in 1998, which was the first year of competition for the now defunct class. His Cavalier had an E.T. of 7.08 seconds. In October 1988, Lingenfelter also drove the Callaway Sledgehammer to attain the closed-course speed record for a street driven car at 254.76 mph; a record that stood for 25 years.

Lingenfelter was the founder of Lingenfelter Performance Engineering (LPE for short) in Decatur, Indiana. LPE is a shop specializing in the modification of GM vehicles such as the F-Bodies (Camaro, Firebird), B Bodies (Impala SS, Caprice, Roadmaster, Fleetwood), Corvette, CTS-V, GTO, Silverado, Suburban, Tahoe, Escalade, Denali, SSR, Hummer H2, and Sierra. The shop also worked with tuning packages for the Dodge Viper and Plymouth Prowler.

In the press, Lingenfelter's tuned vehicles were reported to have as much civility as the stock vehicles upon which they were based in everyday driving. However, these vehicles were brutally fast. Motor Trend tested a Tahoe tuned by Lingenfelter and achieved a 5.1 second 0-60 time as well as a 0.95g lateral acceleration figure. These numbers match the performance figures of the C4 Corvette and GMC Syclones/Typhoons of that era. This Tahoe had its 350in^{3} V8 bored and stroked to 396in^{3}, making 500 hp and still retaining its 4WD drivetrain. Motor Trend also tested a Lingenfelter built Impala SS that had the same performance numbers as the last generation M5 (0-60 4.7 sec) due to its bored and stroked LT-1 (Displacement rose to 383in^{3} and horsepower rose to 440). Another vehicle built by Lingenfelter was also featured in the June 1996 issue of Car and Driver when they built a special C4 Corvette with a 427in^{3} engine that attained a top speed of 212 mph. Currently, the most powerful vehicle they have in their stable is a 2006 twin-turbo Corvette Z06 with 1,109 rear wheel horsepower worth $288,540. Lingenfelter built the engine for "Big Red", a 1969 Camaro that has achieved speeds in excess of 200 mph.

Lingenfelter was critically injured during an NHRA Summit Sports Compact drag racing event at Pomona, California on October 27, 2002. He died Thursday December 25, 2003 at Adams County Memorial Hospital in Decatur, Indiana at age 58.

== See also ==
- John Lingenfelter Memorial Trophy
