= Mosler TwinStar =

2000 automobile developed by Mosler Automotive

The Mosler TwinStar was an automobile developed by Mosler Automotive in 2000. The vehicle was essentially a Cadillac Eldorado that had been modified to fit two Northstar V8 engines. One engine remained in the factory-equipped location underneath the hood, and another was located in what was formerly the vehicle's trunk.

Each engine was capable of making 300 horsepower (220 kW) and was connected to the nearest axle, creating an all-wheel drive (AWD) layout.

== Specifications ==
- Body layout: Two door, luxury/sports coupe
- Engine(s): Two Cadillac Northstar V8 engines
- Drivetrain: All-Wheel Drive
- Horsepower: 600 horsepower (from the combined output of both engines)
- Performance: 0-60 mph (97 km/h) in 4.5 seconds. Estimated quarter mile time in 12.5 seconds
- Top Speed: 207 mph (333 km/h) (estimated)

== See also ==
- Cadillac Eldorado
- Mosler Automotive
- Northstar engine
- Dual-motor, four-wheel-drive layout
