= NASCAR National Commissioner =

The NASCAR National Commissioner is a largely honorary title awarded by the National Association for Stock Car Auto Racing (NASCAR). Created by NASCAR founder Bill France Sr. as a reward for contributions to the sport of auto racing, the commissioner acts as the final appeal for penalties and sanctions dispensed by the auto racing sanctioning body.

== History ==
Established by Bill France, Sr., the position of National Honorary Commissioner of Racing was intended to be a powerless, honorary title in recognition of lifetime contributions to the sport of stock car racing. The title was originally awarded by France to Erwin Baker, known as "Cannonball"; following his tenure in the position, he was replaced by General Motors design czar – and personal friend of "Big Bill" France – Harley Earl, with Earl being followed by Dixiecrat Mendel Rivers.

The position has, over the years, evolved into the final court of appeal for those protesting penalties and sanctions administered by NASCAR to its competitors. Following appeal to the National Stock Car Racing Commission, a 32-member body, an appellant can appeal directly to the Commissioner instead of accepting the Commission's verdict. During the eight years prior to 2010, 102 appeal hearings were held by the Commission; of those, only eight were overturned by the Commission, while a ninth penalty was overturned on appeal to the Commissioner. A total of twelve appeals were heard by the Commissioner between 1999 and 2009.

As of 2010 the NASCAR National Commissioner is John Middlebrook, who assumed the post upon the retirement of Charles D. Strang before the start of the 2010 NASCAR Sprint Cup Series season. NASCAR's records on the commissioner position are surprisingly sketchy; upon Strang's retirement, the sanctioning body was uncertain as to the exact amount of time he had held the post of Commissioner.

== List of commissioners ==
Name	Photo	Year appointed	Year departed
Erwin "Cannonball" Baker		1947	1960
Harley Earl		1960	1969
L. Mendel Rivers		1969	1970
Tom Adams		1971	?
Semon "Bunkie" Knudsen		1978	1998
Charles D. Strang		1998	2009
John Middlebrook		2010	
