= Csaba Csere =

Csaba Csere (US: /ˈtʃʌbə ˈtʃɛdə/ CHUB-ə CHED-ə) is a former technical director and editor-in-chief of Car and Driver magazine.

Csere is an American of Hungarian descent. He earned a bachelor's degree in mechanical engineering at the Massachusetts Institute of Technology in 1975. He went on to join Ford Motor Company's Advanced Engine Engineering Office. He joined Car and Driver magazine as its technical editor in 1980. He specialized in stories about technical issues and first-person experiences in competition machines ranging from NASCAR stock cars to Formula One cars. In the process, he raced in fifteen 24-hour events and performed an automotive backflip at over 200 mph on the Bonneville Salt Flats.

Csere became editor-in-chief in 1993 and concentrated on integrating Car and Driver's TV, Internet, and radio efforts. He presided over a controversial redesign of the magazine, launched in December 2006 and refined during 2007. The cover featured capitalized headlines, often with an exclamation point, and featured bands of yellow. Inside, there was further prominent use of yellow, his favourite color. Additional yellow coloration was to be found on the Car and Driver website. The redesign was roundly criticized in the 'Backfires' (Reader's Letters) section of the March 2007 issue. In that column, the editor admitted to receiving 164 letters against the redesign and 13 for, but stated:

"We paid big bucks for this yellow redesign and we ain't going back - Ed".

On December 16, 2008 — according to the official press release of Hachette Filipacchi Media U.S. — Csere resigned his position as editor-in-chief. No explanation was given, and Csere has refused to discuss the reasons for his departure. He did not write a goodbye column for the magazine where he had worked for 29 years.

By the August 2009 issue of Car and Driver the controversial redesign had largely been dropped in favor of a look more closely resembling the prior design. In the September 2009 issue Csere contributed a feature entitled 'Lightly Used Cars'. The June 2010 issue contained a feature contributed by Csere titled "Suck, Squeeze, Bang! Blow, Ad Infinitum" and extensively used the colour yellow once again.

Outside of Car and Driver, Csere has appeared as an authority on automotive issues in the United States Senate and many national television and radio news programs.

In January 2012, Csere began writing for The New York Times, with his first car review on the 2012 Honda CR-V.

Csere is still regularly seen working with Car and Driver under the title of contributing editor. Online, he presents many of Car and Driver's 'Tested' video reviews of automobiles on YouTube.
