= One Lap of America =

Annual motorsports event in the United States

The Brock Yates' One Lap of America is an annual motorsports event in the United States that has been held since 1984. It is the successor to the Cannonball Baker Sea-to-Shining-Sea Memorial Trophy Dash, an underground auto race of the 1970s.

The original premise for both was to drive cross-country, but One Lap of America now respects speed limits, and has become a set of time trials at racetracks around the country, with overnight road trips between tracks. A minimum of two drivers are required. Cars must be street-legal and run one set of street tires the entire event.

Both events are the creation of automotive journalist Brock Yates. One Lap of America is currently sponsored by Tire Rack and organized by Brock Yates, Jr.

== History ==
Competition occurs as time trials held at various race tracks around the country. The competitors drive from track to track overnight, without the benefit of support crews. The field is divided into several classes based primarily on original manufacturers suggested retail prices and number of doors. Competitors may make any modifications to their vehicles as they see fit but must run on a single set of tires, typically provided by the race sponsor, throughout the entire event, and vehicles must remain street legal with the modifications. Race track events are time trials with up to eight cars on track at a time. Competition is for fastest time rather than wheel-to-wheel racing.

The first One Lap in 1984 circumnavigated the lower forty-eight United States with the scoring based on comparing the entrants' declared mileage with that of the organizer's ("guess Brock's mileage"). From 1985 through 1991 competition was a series of road rallies: time-speed-distance events conducted on public roads. The length of One Lap of America has been as long as 10,000 miles (16,000 km) over ten days (1989) to just under 3,000 miles (4,800 km) over six days.

The One Lap of America has attracted such famous drivers as Parnelli Jones, Price Cobb, Brian Makse, John Buffum, Elliott Forbes-Robinson, and Hurley Haywood. It is sanctioned by the National Auto Sport Association and since 2013 benefits the Alzheimer's Association, as founder Brock Yates suffered from the disease for nearly 12 years until his death in 2016.

== Previous Winners ==
Winning Vehicle Info
Year	Drivers	Vehicle Make	Vehicle Model	Vehicle Year	Vehicle Drivetrain
2024	Dave Ogburn III & Nick Gullatta	Porsche	911 Turbo S	2021	AWD
2023	Tom O'Gorman & Salil Shukla	Porsche	GT3	2019	AWD
2022	Tom O'Gorman & Steve Loudin	Chevy	Corvette Zr1	2019	RWD
2021	Tom O'Gorman & Steve Loudin	Chevy	Corvette Zr1	2019	RWD
2020	NOLAP 2020				
2019	Micaiah Hackbarth & Brandon Ranvek	Audi	TTRS	2018	AWD
2018	Christoper & Tina Lewis	Chevy	Corvette	2015	RWD
2017	Huge Bates & Devin Bruce	Nissan	GTR	2013	AWD
2016	Robert & Amanda Thorne	Nissan	GTR	2015	AWD
2015	Catesby Jones & William Taylor	Nissan	GTR	2010	AWD
2014	Catesby Jones & William Taylor	Nissan	GTR	2010	AWD
2013	Douglas Wilks & Leh Keen	Nissan	GTR	2013	AWD
2012	Douglas Wilks & Leh Keen	Nissan	GTR	2010	AWD
2011	Douglas Wilks & Leh Keen	Nissan	GTR	2010	AWD
2010	Douglas Wilks & Leh Keen	Porsche	GT2	2003	AWD
2009	Steven Rankins & Will Taylor	Nissan	GTR	2009	AWD
2008	Mark DaVia & Drew Wikstrom	Porsche	996 twin turbo		AWD
2007	Mark DaVia & Drew Wikstrom	Porsche	996 twin turbo		AWD
2006	Mark DaVia & Drew Wikstrom	Porsche	996 twin turbo	2001	AWD
2005	Mark DaVia & Drew Wikstrom	Porsche	911 turbo	2001	AWD
2004	Mark DaVia & Drew Wikstrom	Porsche	911 turbo		AWD
2003	Ronald Adee & John Myrick	Chevy	Corvette C5 Z06 - MTI z-07		RWD
2002	Brian Smith & David Zelkowski	Dodge	Viper ARC	2001	RWD
2001	Brian Smith & Spencer Geswein	Dodge	Viper GTS	2000	RWD
2000	Brian Smith & Spencer Geswein	Dodge	Viper GTS	1998	RWD
1999	Rick Lee and Kevin Wesley	Mosler	Raptor	1997	
1998	Ronald Adee	Dodge	Viper	1996	AWD
1997		Mosler	Raptor	1997	RWD
1996		Mosler	Intruder (Lingenfelter)	1994	RWD
1995	David Murray & John Lawlor	Porsche	911 Turbo		
1994	Vince Bodiford	Porsche	911 Carrera		
1993	Dan Jankowski & Elliot Forbes-Robinson	Dodge	Viper	1992	RWD
1992	John Buffum, Tom Grimshaw, Satch Carlson	BMW	M5	1992	RWD
1991	Tom Grimshaw & John Buffum	Dodge	Stealth R/T	1991	AWD
