= Car and Driver =

American automotive magazine

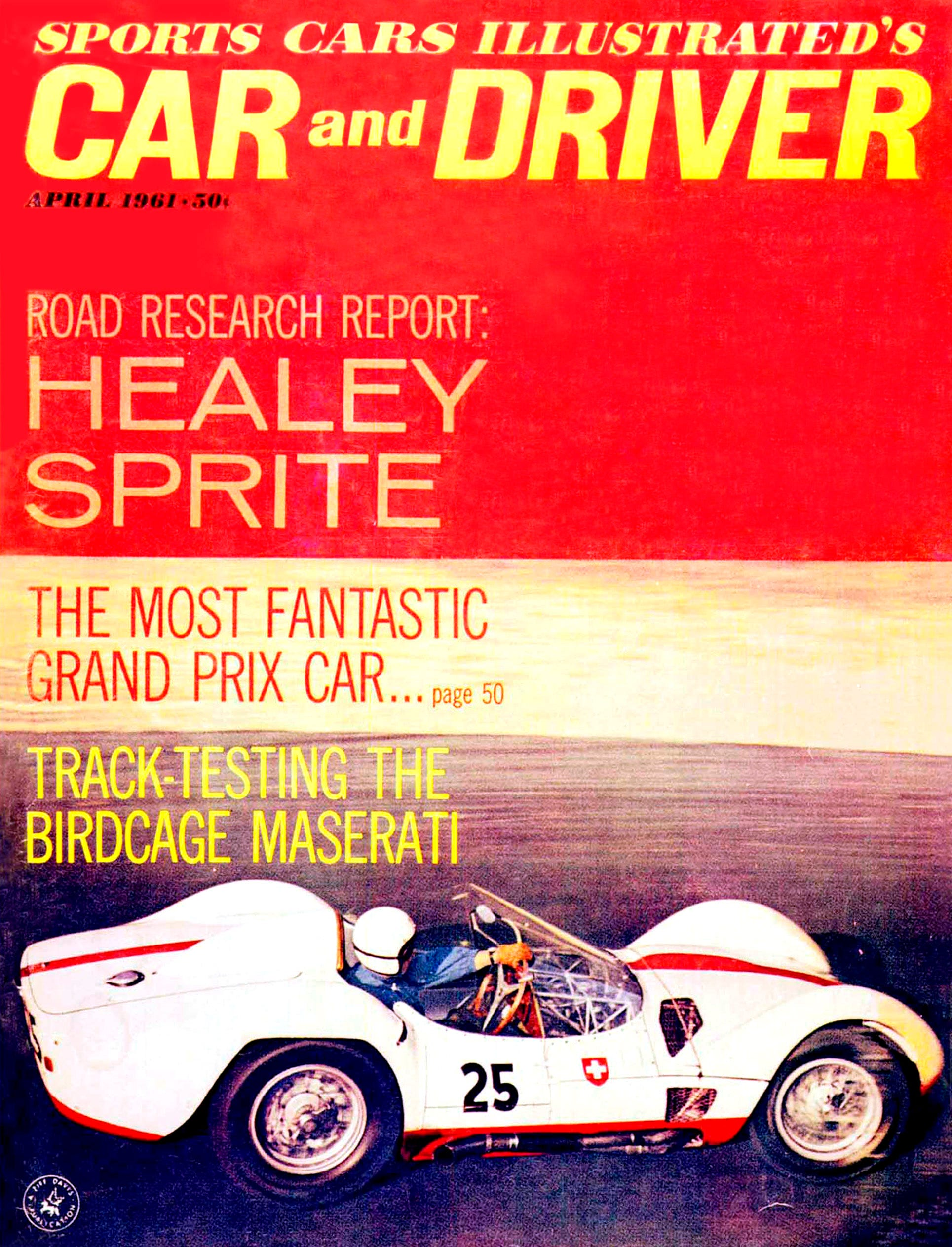
- First issue under the name Car and Driver (April 1961)
- Categories: Automobile
- Frequency: Monthly (1955–2024); Bimonthly (2024–present)
- Total circulation: 405,092 (2024)
- First issue: July 1955; 71 years ago (as Sports Cars Illustrated)
- Company: Hearst Communications
- Country: United States, Switzerland, Italy, United Kingdom, France, Spain
- Based in: Ann Arbor, Michigan
- Language: English (US, Middle East), Chinese (China), Portuguese (Brazil), Greek (Greece) and Spanish (Spain)
- Website: www.caranddriver.com
- ISSN: 0008-6002

Car and Driver (CD or C/D) is an American automotive enthusiast magazine first published in 1955. In 2006 its total circulation was 1.23 million. It is owned by Hearst Magazines, who purchased it from its prior owner Hachette Filipacchi Media U.S. in 2011. It was founded as Sports Cars Illustrated. The magazine is based in Ann Arbor, Michigan.

== History ==
Ownership
Issues	Owner
Jul 1955 – Feb 1956	Motor Publications
Mar 1956 – Apr 1985	Ziff Davis
May 1985 – Dec 1987	CBS Magazines
Jan 1988 – Apr 1988	Diamandis Communications
Apr 1988 – May 2011	Hachette Filipacchi Media U.S.
May 2011 – Present	Hearst Communications

Car and Driver was formed as Sports Cars Illustrated in 1955. In its early years, the magazine focused primarily on small, imported sports cars. In 1961, editor Karl Ludvigsen renamed the magazine Car and Driver to show a more general automotive focus.

Car and Driver once featured Bruce McCall, Jean Shepherd, and Brock Yates as columnists, and P. J. O'Rourke as a frequent contributor. Former editors include William Jeanes and David E. Davis, Jr., the latter of whom led some employees to defect in 1985 to create Automobile.

When CBS acquired Ziff Davis' consumer magazines in 1985, the company decided to keep both Car and Driver and existing CBS automobile magazine, Road & Track. Successive owners keep this arrangement.

Rather than electing a Car of the Year, Car and Driver publishes its top ten picks each year in its Car and Driver 10Best.

Car and Driver is home to the John Lingenfelter Memorial Trophy. This award is given annually at their Supercar Challenge.

Currently, Car and Driver is also published in Germany, Switzerland, the United Kingdom, and Spain. The Spanish version just makes use of the Car and Driver name; no editorial direction is shared. China had an edition called 名车志 Car and Driver (transl. Quality Automotive Magazine "Car and Driver"). The Middle Eastern edition is issued by ITP Publishing based in Dubai.

== Editorial direction ==
Editors
Issues	Editor
Jul 1955 – Nov 1955	George Parks
Dec 1955 – Feb 1956	Arthur Kramer
Mar 1956 – Dec 1956	Ken Purdy
Jan 1957 – Nov 1959	John Christy
Dec 1959 – Jan 1962	Karl Ludvigsen
Feb 1962 – Feb 1963	William Pain
Mar 1963 – Jan 1966	David E. Davis, Jr.
Feb 1966 – Oct 1966	Brock Yates
Nov 1966 – Jan 1968	Steve Smith
Feb 1968 – Dec 1969	Leon Mandel
Jan 1970 – Mar 1971	Gordon Jennings
Apr 1971 – Nov 1974	Bob Brown
Dec 1974 – Sep 1976	Stephan Wilkinson
Oct 1976 – Oct 1985	David E. Davis, Jr.
Nov 1985 – Feb 1988	Don Sherman
Mar 1988 – May 1993	William Jeanes
Jun 1993 – Dec 2008	Csaba Csere
Mar 2009 – April 2019	Eddie Alterman
April 2019 – Jan 2022	Sharon Silke Carty
Feb 2022 –	Tony Quiroga

The magazine was one of the first to be unabashedly critical of the American automakers. However, it has been quick to praise noteworthy efforts like the Ford Focus and Chevrolet Corvette.

The magazine has been at the center of a few controversies based on this editorial direction, including the following:

- Their instrumented testing twice revealed false power claims by manufacturers: Both the 1999 SVT Mustang Cobra and 2001 Mazda Miata tests showed these vehicles not producing performance equivalents to their claimed power output. In both cases, the manufacturers' claims were proved wrong, forcing buybacks and apologies.
- In its Sept. 1990 issue, reviewers operated a GM-EMD SD60 and saw how a locomotive was made and test one out before it was delivered to the Kansas City Southern Railway.
- In its February 1968 issue, Cook Neilson authored a scathing review of the 1968 Kadett LS 1.5L wagon. The vehicle, which by many accounts was a moderately well-executed example in its class, received a singly critical and extensively negative review from Nielson, with General Motors subsequently pulling its advertising from the magazine. Paul Niedermeyer, editor of the automotive history site Curbside Classics and managing editor at The Truth About Cars, would later call the review "sophmoric" and "blantantly contrived." Author Marty Padgett, in his book 50 Years With Car and Driver, recounted that the magazine's editor at the time, Leon Mandel, had wanted a diatribe in order to increase the magazine's relevance.

The magazine is widely known for an often irreverent tone, especially regarding cars it considers inferior. The magazine also frequently touches on politics. The editorial slant of the magazine is decidedly pro-automobile.

== Website ==
Car and Driver operates a website that features articles (both original and from print), a blog, an automotive buyer's guide (with AccuPayment, a price-calculating tool), and a social networking site called Backfires. As had occurred with other online auto magazines, Car and Driver first suspended its popular Backfires column in 2020; then, did make a partial effort in 2021 to continue with readers' comments, but eventually found, like the other magazines, the effort was too costly and often too divisive.

== Car and Driver Television ==
Car and Driver Television was the television counterpart that formerly aired on TNN/SpikeTV's Powerblock weekend lineup from 1999 to 2005. It was produced by RTM Productions and hosted by Jim Scoutten—who also hosted American Shooter, another RTM production—until 2003.

Thereafter the usual host was Larry Webster, one of the magazine's editors, with Csaba Csere adding occasional commentary and news.

== Car and Driver computer game ==
In 1993, Car and Driver licensed its name for a PC game to Electronic Arts entitled Car and Driver. The game was in 3D, and the courses included racing circuits, an oval track, automobile route racing with traffic, a dragstrip, and an autocross circuit.

The ten vehicles included the Porsche 959, Ferrari F40, Lotus Esprit, Eagle Talon, and the Ferrari 512.

== The "Cannonball Run" ==
In the 1970s, to celebrate the Interstate Highway System and to protest speed limits, reporter Brock Yates and editor Steve Smith conceived the idea of an unsanctioned, informal race across the country, replicating the 53.5-hour transcontinental drive made by American automobile and motorcycle racer Erwin George "Cannonball" Baker in 1933. The New York to Los Angeles Cannonball Baker Sea-to-Shining-Sea Memorial Trophy Dash, later shortened to the "Cannonball Run", was staged in 1971, 1972, 1975 and 1979, with the race entries including both amateur drivers and professional racers, such as Dan Gurney (who with Brock Yates "won" the 1971 event driving a Ferrari 365 GTB/4, making the 2,860 miles (4,600 km) journey in under 36 hours).

The stunt served as the inspiration for several Hollywood blockbusters, such as The Gumball Rally, The Cannonball Run, Cannonball Run II, Cannonball Run III, Gone in 60 Seconds and The Fast and the Furious franchise.

== See also ==
- Philip Llewellin
