= Cannonball Run =

Cannonball Run may refer to:

== Races ==
=== Automobile ===
- Erwin "Cannon Ball" Baker's 1933 drive from New York City to Los Angeles
- Cannonball Baker Sea-to-Shining-Sea Memorial Trophy Dash, an outlaw car race run several times in the 1970s, memorializing Erwin Baker's drive
- Cannonball Run challenge, 21st-century unsanctioned speed record attempts from New York to Los Angeles
- Australian Cannonball Cup, a street race from Melbourne to Perth held in 1984

=== Other ===
- Cannonball run (Galle Face), an annual run in Colombo, Sri Lanka, to commemorate the 1845 misfiring of a British cannon on Galle Face Green

== Film and television ==
- The Cannonball Run, a 1981 film
- Cannonball Run II, a 1984 film
- Speed Zone, a 1989 film, also known as Cannonball Fever or Cannonball Run III
- Cannonball Run 2001, a reality television series

== Other uses ==
- Cannonball Run (roller coaster), a wooden roller coaster located at Waterville USA.

== See also ==
- Cannonball (film), 1976
- Cannonball (disambiguation)
