= Cannonball Run challenge =

Unsanctioned vehicle speed record

Red Ball Garage in New York on East 31st Street

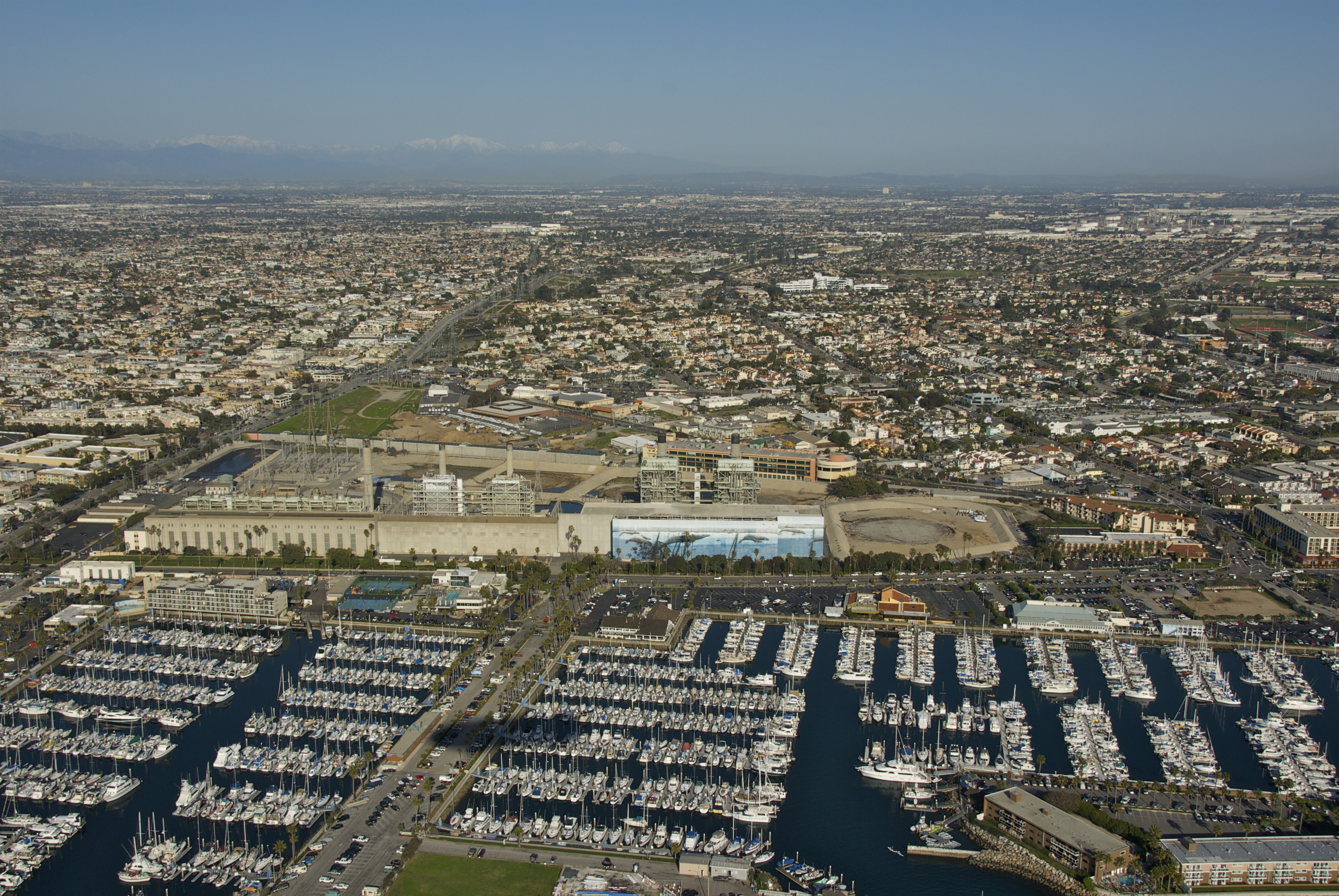
The Portofino Hotel (bottom right) in Redondo Beach, California

A Cannonball Run is an unsanctioned speed record for driving across the United States, typically accepted to run from New York City's Red Ball Garage to the Portofino Hotel in Redondo Beach, California, near Los Angeles, covering a distance of about 2,813 miles (4,527 km). As of May 2020, the overall record is 25 hours 39 minutes, with an average speed of 112 miles per hour (180 km/h), driven by Arne Toman, Douglas Tabbutt, and Dunadel Daryoush, during the COVID-19 pandemic.

The average speeds achieved in reported runs are far in excess of speed limits anywhere in the United States. Successful record attempts have employed a variety of tactics for evading traffic law enforcement.

== History ==
The cannonball run began as an unofficial, unsanctioned automobile race run five times in the 1970s from New York City and Darien, Connecticut, on the East Coast of the United States to the Portofino Inn in the Los Angeles suburb of Redondo Beach, California. These races were called the Cannonball Baker Sea-To-Shining Sea Memorial Trophy Dash.

Conceived by car magazine writer and auto racer Brock Yates and fellow Car and Driver editor Steve Smith, the first run was not a competitive race as only one team was running. The run was intended both as a celebration of the United States Interstate Highway System and as a protest against strict traffic laws coming into effect at the time. Another motivation was the fun involved, which showed in the tongue-in-cheek reports in Car and Driver and other auto publications worldwide. The initial cross-country run was made by Yates; his son, Brock Yates, Jr.; Steve Smith; and friend Jim Williams beginning on May 3, 1971, in a 1971 Dodge Custom Sportsman van called the "Moon Trash II."

The race was run four more times: November 15, 1971; November 13, 1972; April 23, 1975; and April 1, 1979.

== Format ==
The traditional start point is the Red Ball Garage on East 31st Street, Manhattan, and its finish is at the Portofino Hotel in Redondo Beach, California, a distance of just over 2,800 miles (4,500 km) depending on the route. A second starting point emerged for the 1979 running at the Goodwives Shopping Center in Darien, Connecticut. The route from this point is said to be approximately 41 miles (66 km) farther than the Red Ball Garage starting point. Since the record is unsanctioned, there are no official limits imposed on cars, routes, technologies, or strategies used in record runs. Record-setting runs are typically self-verified by record-setters through witnesses, toll receipts, continuous video of the run, and GPS tracking. Contemporary record-setting runs are typically driven by a team of drivers and copilots in a high-performance, but inconspicuous car. Cars are commonly modified with auxiliary fuel tanks to extend range, and are frequently modified to increase performance and durability. Cars are also commonly modified to help evade police, using equipment such as police radio, radar and laser detectors and/or jamming, and cosmetic alterations that obscure the car's identity. Several attempts have also implemented police-spotting teams traveling ahead of the record-run in cars or even general-aviation aircraft.

== Legality and ethics ==
Record attempts are criticized for their illegality and disregard for public safety. The attempts are not authorized by any law enforcement agency. Others have criticized modern day cannonball runs as vanity projects for the drivers, while also stating that with traffic enforcement during and after the COVID-19 pandemic declining, and traffic collision fatalities rising, that the runs no longer have the same allure from evading law enforcement nor serve any other purpose.

== List of records ==
=== Outright Cannonball record ===
On October 7–9, 2006, Alex Roy, Dave Maher and filmmaker Cory Welles set a transcontinental record of 31 hours 4 minutes from the Classic Car Club NYC to Santa Monica Pier using a modified 2000 BMW M5, averaging 90 miles per hour (140 km/h) with a top speed of 157 miles per hour (253 km/h). A spotter plane was deployed for the daytime sections. This and the U.S. Express are depicted in the 2019 documentary APEX: The Secret Race Across America.

In May 2007, Richard Rawlings and co-pilot Dennis Collins allegedly broke the 1979 Cannonball Run time during the 2007 Bullrun entry, driving a black Ferrari 550, modified with extra fuel tanks. Their final time was 31 hours and 59 minutes.

In October 2013, a team led by Ed Bolian with Dave Black and Dan Huang set a transcontinental record of 28 hours 50 minutes in a modified 2004 Mercedes-Benz CL55 AMG, averaging 98 miles per hour (158 km/h) with top speed of 182 miles per hour (293 km/h). Black shared driving with Bolian, who served as the primary driver, while Huang served as spotter watching for police and obstructions such as deer or construction using image stabilized binoculars.

In November 2019, the driving team of Arne Toman and Doug Tabbutt, with spotter Berkeley Chadwick, set a transcontinental record of 27 hours 25 minutes. The team averaged 103 miles per hour (166 km/h) and reached a top speed of 193 miles per hour (311 km/h) on the trip covering 13 states. The 2015 Mercedes-Benz E63 AMG was modified to provide 800 horsepower (811 PS; 597 kW) and fitted with an additional fuel tank in the trunk providing 67 US gallons (56 imp gal; 250 L) enabling the team to stop just four times for fuel for a total of just over 22 minutes. The car was also equipped with police scanner, CB radio, a thermal camera to help the team spot police on the ground and in the air as well as a laser jammer. The team left early November ahead of Thanksgiving travel traffic and chose a route based on weather forecasts which provided dry weather through the entire trip.

==== During the COVID-19 pandemic ====
The record was broken multiple times during the COVID-19 pandemic, taking advantage of a reduction in both road users and law enforcement presence.

In April 2020, a formerly anonymous crew now identified as Chris Allen, James Allen, and Kale Odhner traveled from the Red Ball Garage on the east side of Manhattan to the Portofino Hotel — a total of 2,825.3 miles (4,546.9 km) — in 26 hours 38 minutes. The team averaged 106 miles per hour (171 km/h) in a 2019 Audi A8L with extra fuel tanks in the trunk.

In May 2020, Arne Toman, Doug Tabbutt, and spotter Dunadel Daryoush set the new cannonball record of 25 hours and 39 minutes in a modified 2016 Audi S6 disguised to look like a Ford Police Interceptor Sedan. Police-evasion modifications included brake light kill-switches, radar detectors, laser diffusers, CB radio, and a roof-mounted thermal camera. Performance modifications included a trunk-mounted 67-US-gallon (56 imp gal; 250 L) auxiliary fuel tank taken from the car used in Toman and Tabbutt's 2019 cannonball run, modified turbochargers, an upgraded heat-exchanger, and custom ECU tuning that allowed engine-mapping to be changed to suit 91- or 93-octane fuel, allowing the car to generate an estimated 600 horsepower (608 PS; 447 kW). The run achieved an overall average speed of 110 miles per hour (177 km/h), with average speeds upwards of 125 miles per hour (201 km/h) across some states, and which "at no time exceeded 175 miles per hour (282 km/h)". This is the widely accepted current record.

In early June 2020, as reported by Road & Track, Fred Ashmore allegedly completed a solo run in 25 hours and 55 minutes. The claim was cast into doubt by Road & Track after investigation showed the evidence to support the claim to be doctored.

=== Double transcontinental record ===
In May 2020, the team of Chris Clemens and Mark Spence in a highly modified Mercedes SL500 followed the Toman/Tabbutt team out of New York, drove from the Red Ball Garage in New York City to the Portofino Hotel & Marina in Redondo Beach, California and then turned around and went back to the Red Ball Garage in 74 hours and 5 minutes.

In April 2022, the team of Nik Krueger, Mark Spence and Wesley Vigh drove from the Red Ball Garage to the Portofino Hotel, then back to the Red Ball Garage in 65 hours and 28 minutes, shattering the prior record by nearly 8 1/2 hours. The team used a modified 2008 Saab 9-5. That record was beaten just one week later by Bennett Wilson, Chris Ruppmann, and Grady Leno with a time of 65 hours and 19 minutes in a 2012 Mercedes-Benz S-Class in April 2022.

In October 2024, the team of Nik Krueger, Wesley Vigh, and Christopher Michaels drove from the Red Ball Garage to the Portofino Hotel and back to the Red Ball Garage in 61 hours and 59 minutes, setting the current Coast-to-Coast-to-Coast Cannonball Run Record and reclaiming their short-lived title from 2022. The run used the same 2008 Saab 9-5.

=== Diesel record ===
On April 4, 2020, the three-man team consisting of Sean G. Petr, Jason Adkins, and Mark Spence piloted a 2014 Volkswagen Passat TDI SE from Goodwives Shopping Center in Darien, Connecticut to the Portofino Hotel and Marina in 28 hours and 30 minutes beating both the previous diesel record and Darien-Redondo time by more than 3 hours. The team averaged both 25.5 mpg_{‑US} (30.6 mpg_{‑imp}; 9.2 L/100 km; 10.8 km/L) and 100.07 mph (161.05 km/h) over the 2,852-mile (4,590 km) journey.

In August 2024, Las Vegas native Chris Stowell would complete a solo run of 27 hours and 16 minutes in a 2015 BMW 535d, not only breaking the diesel record, but also the last verified solo record (as Fred Ashmore's run has been disproven) by Carl Dietz in a Cadillac ATS, who ran it in 27 hours and 54 minutes. Stowell also beat the pre-pandemic outright record set by the team of Arne Toman, Doug Tabbutt, and Berkeley Chadwick. Stowel averaged around 23 mpg_{‑US} (27.6 mpg_{‑imp}; 10.2 L/100 km; 9.8 km/L) and 105 miles per hour (169 km/h) over the journey.

=== Motorcycle record ===
Motorcycle between New York and Los Angeles 1917 to present:

1. Alan T Bedell drove a Henderson 4-cylinder motorcycle from LA to NYC in 7 days, 16 hours, and 16 minutes on June 13, 1917.
2. Erwin "Cannonball" Baker drove his Ace motorcycle from LA to NYC in 6 days, 22 hours, 52 minutes in 1922.
3. Wells Bennet rode an Excelsior/Henderson in 1922 to cross NYC to LA in 6 days, 16 hours, 13 minutes.
4. Earl Robinson in 1935 did the run in 3 days, 6 hours, 53 minutes.
5. Rody Rodenberg set his record of 71 hours 20 minutes during June 17–20, 1936, on a 1936 Indian Scout. This was disputed by Dot Robinson.
6. John Penton (of Penton racing fame) set a time of 52 hours 11 minutes for the solo LA-to-NYC motorcycle run in 1959. The trek was made on a BMW R69S.
7. Tibor Sarossy, at the time a college student, set a record in 1968 of 45 hours 41 minutes. Tibor used a homemade fuel tank made of jerry cans, which allowed for a reported four fuel stops. He also claims he never slept, although he did pass out from a diet of Hershey Bars and coffee at a produce inspection station in California. He averaged 58.7 miles per hour (94.5 km/h) on a BMW R69S.
8. Fred Boyajian set a new time of 42 hours 6 minutes on October 11, 1969. Fred used a beer keg to provide extra fuel. Evidence was Western Union telegrams at New York City and Los Angeles.
9. Carl Reese left from West Valley Cycle Sales BMW Dealership in Winnetka, California, at 3:15 a.m. PST on August 28, 2015. Reese arrived at BMW Motorrad dealership in Manhattan, New York City, at 9:04 p.m. EST the next day, travelling 2,829 miles (4,553 km) in 38 hours 49 minutes (average speed 72.88 mph [117.29 km/h]) on a K1600GT BMW motorcycle. The trip was documented by notaries at both start and finish.
10. Adam Frasca posted a time of 37 hours and 7 minutes. Frasca departed Manhattan, NYC at 12:03 am EDT Tuesday, April 9, 2019, and arrived Redondo Beach, LA at 10:10 am PDT.
11. Calvin Cote completed the run in a time of 35:06:00, departing the Portofino Hotel and Marina on April 20, 2019 at 3:00 am (PDT) and arriving at the Red Ball Garage on April 21, 2019 at 5:06 pm (EDT). The 2,772-mile (4,461 km) run was completed on a 2012 BMW K1600 GTL equipped with a 15-US-gallon (12 imp gal; 57 L) auxiliary fuel tank, radar detector, and radar/lidar absorbing paint.
12. Alex Jones set a new benchmark of 32:52:00 atop his 2014 Yamaha FJR1300. The bike was equipped with a 7-US-gallon (5.8 imp gal; 26 L) auxiliary fuel tank, radar detector, laser jammers, and additional lighting. Jones left the Red Ball Garage on October 17, 2017 at 6:24 am (EDT) and arrived at Portofino Hotel on October 18, 2017 at 12:16 pm (PDT), covering more than 2,800 mi (4,500 km) with stops only to refuel.
13. Ross "Beau" Earnest set a new time of 32 hours and 32 minutes between April 19–21, 2024. The 2008 Yamaha FJR1300 was equipped with an additional fuel cell, laser jammers, radar detector and a thermal night vision camera. Earnest left the Red Ball Garage in NYC on Friday April 19 at 10:00 am (EST) and made it to the Portofino Inn Hotel in Redondo Beach, CA Sunday morning April 21 at 3:32 am (PDT). Covering more than 2,800 miles (4,506 km) he only stopped 5 times for fuel and was able to keep an average of 86.5 miles per hour (139.2 km/h).

=== Electric vehicle record ===
In 1968, the Great Transcontinental Electric Car Race was held between student groups at Caltech and MIT. The Caltech team, led by EV pioneer Wally Rippel, converted a 1958 VW Microbus powered by lead-cobalt batteries from Electric Fuel Propulsion Corporation of Detroit. The MIT team converted a 1968 Chevrolet Corvair powered by NiCad batteries. The MIT team raced from Cambridge, Massachusetts, to Pasadena, California, while the Caltech team raced the opposite direction. A network of 54 charging locations was set up along the 3,311-mile (5,329 km) route, spaced 21 to 95 miles (34 to 153 km) apart. The race began on August 26, 1968, and ended on September 4. Although the MIT team reached Pasadena first, they were towed part of the way. After assessing penalty points, Caltech was declared the winner with a corrected time of 210 hours 3 minutes.

With the introduction of long-range EVs, such as the Tesla Roadster (2008) and, in particular, the Tesla Model S, coast-to-coast travel became more feasible. In January 2014, Tesla Motors completed the first coast-to-coast corridor in their supercharging network for the Model S. A team of 15 from Tesla Motors completed a 3,427-mile (5,515 km) route from Los Angeles to New York City run in 76 hours, 5 minutes. (Time included 60 hours, 8 minutes driving, and 15 hours, 57 minutes charging.) In July 2014, a team from Edmunds completed a slightly shorter 3,331.9-mile route in 67 hours, 21 minutes. (Time included 52 hours, 41 minutes driving, and 14 hours, 40 minutes charging.)

Carl J. Reese and co-drivers Rodney Hawk and Deena Mastracci took advantage of a newly opened corridor on Interstate 70 to drive the 3,011-mile (4,846 km) route from the City Hall in Los Angeles to the City Hall in New York City in 58 hours and 55 minutes during April 16–19, 2015, a new record for EVs in a 2015 Tesla Model S P85D. The drivers stopped 24 times for electric charging, with a total charge time of 12 hours 48 minutes. As proof, Reese presented 16 documents notarized on both ends, identifying drivers and three eyewitnesses: Matt Nordenstrom, Johnnie Oberg Jr., and Anthony Alvarado. Complete GPS logs recorded by GPSInsight (a fleet tracking company) were sent to Jalopnik and the Guinness Book of World Records. GPSInsight provided GPS tracking equipment to the team to verify the event.

On October 18–21, 2015, Deena Mastracci and Reese were joined by Alex Roy. They set a new record for an LA–NYC run in an electric vehicle with a total time of 57 hours, 48 minutes.

On August 24–27, 2016, the LA–NYC record was broken again by a team comprising Alex Roy, Righthook CEO Warren Ahner, and StreetWars founder Franz Aliquo, who completed the run in 55 hours flat in a 2016 Tesla Model S 90D. GPS logs were recorded by US Fleet Tracking, and Comma.AI's Chffr data logger, and data was shared with The Drive.

In December 2017, with an early-production Tesla Model 3, which are delivered to California-based customers only, Alex Roy and co-driver Dan Zorrilla broke the eastbound Electric Cannonball Run record again, driving 2,860 miles (4,600 km) from the Portofino Inn to the Red Ball Garage in 50 hours and 16 minutes. Their drive took place December 28–31 of 2017. GPS data was captured using the GPS Tracks application, and video evidence was shared on YouTube.

In July 2019 a family team of Robin Jedi Thomsen, and her parents Lars Thomsen and Betty Legler set a record of 48 hours 10 minutes driving westbound for 2,835 miles (4,562 km) in a Tesla Model 3 Long Range between July 12 and 14, 2019.

In August 2019, Kyle Conner and Matthew Davis set a record of 45 hours and 16 minutes driving westbound from New York City to Los Angeles in a Tesla Model 3 Long Range which had been modified, including lowering the car for better aerodynamics.

At the end of 2020, Kyle Conner, Drew Peterson and Tijmen Schreur lowered the EV record to 44:26 despite winter conditions in an Out of Spec Motoring Porsche Taycan with the large battery, aerodynamic wheels, and massaging seats, using Electrify America CCS chargers with up to 350 kW.

In October 2021, the EV record was broken twice in the same rented 2021 Tesla Model S Long Range. The first drive, from Los Angeles to New York City, by Ryan Levenson and Will Wood, lowered the EV record to 42:52. The second drive occurred on October 22, 2021, leaving from the Red Ball Garage in Manhattan at 11:00 am and arriving at the Portifino Inn in Redondo Beach, CA 42 hours, 17 minutes later. The second drive was piloted by a driver team of Ryan Levenson and Josh Allan. The only modification made to the stock Tesla was to replace the factory 21-inch wheels with the more efficient Tesla 19-inch wheels and to over-inflate the tire pressure to 47 psi (320 kPa; 3.2 bar) for the second drive.

In April 2023, Kyle Conner attempted another record with the Out of Spec Motoring team, using a Lucid Air. The trip took 44 hours 32 minutes, which did not set a new record. However, their lead car Polestar 1, driven by Alyssa Zupan, set a new plug-in hybrid record with 45 hours and 38 minutes.

In October 2024, Kyle Conner, Tijmen Schreur and Drew Peterson broke the record driving a 2025 Porsche Taycan in 39 hours 29 minutes. They became familiar with the car’s charging curve the week before. After the car was the first EV to reach the finish point in a cross-country EV contest from Seattle, Washington to Boston, Massachusetts named the "I-90 Surge" and involving nine EVs and a comparable ICE vehicle.

=== Electric motorcycle records ===
In April 2022, Steven Day set a record of 111 hours driving the route with a 2022 Energica EVA Ribelle. He drove the route in reverse, from Redondo Beach to New York City.

=== Semi-automated vehicle record ===
In April 2015, the first coast-to-coast semi-automated record was set by employees of Delphi. Delphi engineers covered 3,400 miles (5,500 km), San Francisco to New York City, over a span of nine days.

In October 2015, Carl J. Reese, Deena Mastracci, and Alex Roy set a new coast-to-coast record using Tesla's new Autopilot function. The trio made the 2,995-mile (4,820 km) journey in 57 hours, 48 minutes after departing from Redondo Beach, California on October 18 at 9:15 p.m. PST, and arriving at Red Ball Garage in New York on October 21 at 10:03 a.m. EST. The trip was completed with less than 14 hours of charging and 96% of the driving done by Tesla's Autopilot system.

In August 2016, the semi-automated (SAE Level 2) driving record at 55 hours was set during the electric cross-country record run by Franz Aliquo, Warren Ahner, and Alex Roy in a Tesla Model S 90D, whose "Autopilot" function was engaged 97.7% of the way.

In April 2024, a new semi-automated record was set by Jay Roberts and his wife Gypsy Roberts in a 2017 Prius. The car was fitted with a Comma.ai driver assistance system which ran openpilot. The drive took 43 hours and 18 minutes and was 98.4% autonomous. In April 2025, Jay Roberts and Gypsy Roberts would lower the record to an even 38 hours. The drive was done with 99.125% autonomy.

== Cannonball record progression ==
Time (hrs:mins)	Year	Team members	Vehicle	Notes
271:15	1915	Erwin Baker	Stutz Bearcat	3,728.4 mi (6,000 km) trip from San Diego to New York City using 352 US gal (1,330 L) of gasoline and 8.5 US gal (32 L) of oil with an average speed of 25.2 mph (40.6 km/h) over the 148 hour running time
184:16	1917	Alan T Bedell	Henderson 4 cylinder motorcycle	
53:30	1933	Erwin Baker	Graham-Paige model 57 Blue Streak 8	
48:09	1964	Stanley Rosenthal, Skip Jaehne	1964 Sunbeam Imp Sport, 875cc Rootes/Coventry Climax	Distance: 3,011 miles (4,846 km); Average speed: 62.5 mph (100.6 km/h); Overall fuel economy: 35.6 mpg_{‑US} (42.8 mpg_{‑imp}; 6.6 L/100 km; 15.1 km/L); Fuel capacity 6.6 US gal (5.5 imp gal; 25 L); Unmodified Car. Holland Tunnel Toll to LA city line.
40:51	1971	Brock Yates Sr, Brock Yates Jr, Steve Smith, Jim Williams	1971 Dodge Custom Sportsman	
35:54	1971	Dan Gurney, Brock Yates	Ferrari Daytona	Redball to Portofino
35:53	1975	Jack May, Rick Cline	1973 Ferrari Dino 246GTS	Redball to Portofino
32:51	1979	Dave Heinz, Dave Yarborough	1978 Jaguar XJS	Final Cannonball race – Goodwives (Darien, CT) to Portofino
32:07	1983	David Diem, Doug Turner	Ferrari 308	US Express Race
31:04	2006	Alex Roy, Dave Maher	2000 BMW M5	91 mph (146 km/h) average, 31 minutes stopped. 34 US gal (28 imp gal; 130 L) fuel capacity
28:50	2013	Ed Bolian, Dave Black, Dan Huang	2004 Mercedes-Benz CL55 AMG	98 mph (158 km/h) average, 46 minutes stopped. 67 US gal (56 imp gal; 250 L) fuel capacity
27:25	2019	Arne Toman, Doug Tabbutt, and Berkeley Chadwick	2015 Mercedes-Benz E63 AMG	103 mph (166 km/h) average, 22 minutes stopped, 67 US gal (56 imp gal; 250 L) fuel capacity
26:38	2020	Chris Allen, James Allen, and Kale Odhner	2019 Audi A8	106 mph (171 km/h) average. Marine fuel tanks, 65.7 gallon fuel capacity.
25:39	2020	Arne Toman, Doug Tabbutt, and Dunadel Daryoush	2016 Audi S6	110 mph (180 km/h) average, 31 minutes stopped, 65 US gal (54 imp gal; 250 L) fuel capacity.

== See also ==
- Street racing - practice of illegally using public roadways for automobile races
- The Bandit Run - similar challenge between Texarkana, Texas and Atlanta, Georgia
- Cannonball Run Europe - event running under similar conditions in Europe
- The Cannonball Run - 1981 film starring Burt Reynolds, racing against rival teams.
- The 2904 - continuation event started in 2007. Participants have to drive 2,904 miles (4,674 km) from New York City to San Francisco while also spending a maximum of $2,904 on everything needed including the car.
