= Cannonball Run 2001 =

American reality television series

- Genre: Reality
- Written by: James Eagan; Seth Margolin
- Directed by: Rick Telles
- Presented by: Krista Herman
- Country of origin: United States
- No. of seasons: 1
- No. of episodes: 5

Production
- Running time: 60 minutes
- Production companies: Brass Ring Entertainment; GRB Entertainment

Original release
- Network: USA Network
- Release: August 5 – September 2, 2001

Cannonball Run 2001: Race Across America or known simply as Cannonball Run 2001, is an American reality television series that was broadcast on the USA Network from August 5 to September 2, 2001. It was inspired by the Cannonball Baker Sea-to-Shining-Sea Memorial Trophy Dash, an outlaw road race of the 1970s which was the source for the 1981 film The Cannonball Run and its sequel, Cannonball Run II (1984). The show featured a series of five location-specific challenges along a New York-to-Los Angeles course, as in the original race.

Development of the series started without the participation of Brock Yates, organizer of the original Cannonball and holder of the trademark; indeed, the production company paid Yates for the use of the name just before the show debuted. Yates was not pleased with the series, as he felt it was fake and staged.

In 2005, Yates teamed up with a Cannonball driver and film producer J Sanchez to produce a more authentic reality series called Cannonball: This Is Reality to run alongside the actual One Lap of America race. The project was shelved in 2006 due to lack of interest from networks.

== Episode status ==
In 2023, New York-based film and television studio FilmRise acquired the digital distribution and AVOD rights to the show, so it is made available for streaming online on their app and its partners, The Roku Channel, Tubi and Amazon Prime Video and its sister AVOD service, Amazon Freevee.
