= Cannonball Run Europe =

Illegal motor rally

Cannonball Run Europe is an illegal annual 2,500 mile (4,200 km) international motor rally which takes place on public roads with a different route across Europe each year. The route is kept secret and only revealed to drivers at the start of each day of the six-day event, which historically includes time spent at a world-class circuit.It is named after the Cannonball Baker Sea-to-Shining-Sea Memorial Trophy Dash, and its film adaptation.

== History ==
Founded in 2002, it is renowned alongside Gumball 3000 as one of the original events of its kind.

The origins of Cannonball Run Europe stem back to the infamous 1970s unofficial road races in the United States; the Cannonball Baker Sea-to-Shining-Sea Memorial Trophy Dash and the subsequent 1981 movie The Cannonball Run featuring Burt Reynolds and Roger Moore.

Cannonball Run Europe has been criticised in the press with drivers being stopped for speeding, having their driving licences taken by police and their cars confiscated.

Cars entered include a mix of luxury high-end marques; Bentleys, Porsches, Ferraris and often something quirky; the 2008 Run was won by two English drivers in a Brabus edition Smart.
