= The Bandit Run =

Annual car rally in America

The Bandit Run is a re-enactment of the fictional journey portrayed in the 1977 film Smokey and the Bandit: Texarkana, Texas, to Atlanta, Georgia. It covers a distance of about 650 mi (1,050 km). Unlike the much longer east to west coast Cannonball Run challenge which started as a real race and was later portrayed in a movie: The Cannonball Run, the Bandit Run is a re-enactment of a movie. The first one occurred on May 15, 2007. It has become an annual event.

Since 2007, The Bandit Run has continued annually with routes varying each year. Later runs have included stops in states such as Arkansas, Tennessee, Mississippi, and Georgia, often attracting hundreds of vehicles and national media coverage.

The re-enactment was the brainchild of David Hershey and Dave Hall who wanted to commemorate the 30-year anniversary of the classic film. Hall, of the website, Restore a Muscle Car and Hershey came up with the idea shortly after Hershey purchased his restored 1977 Pontiac Trans Am from him in 2006.

== 2007 ==
Following the same route that the characters Bo "the Bandit" Darville (Burt Reynolds) and Cledus "the Snowman" Snow (Jerry Reed) made in the 1977 movie, a group of about 30 Trans Ams started out in Texarkana on May 15, 2007. There, they had a send-off at the Classic Car Museum. Both Texarkana mayors also got involved and gave a send-off speech to the group. Heading east on the three-day trip, they were joined by Hot Rod Magazine and Automobile Magazine. After an evening in Tupelo, the growing group of Bandit Runners received another send-off at the Tupelo Auto Museum on May 16. From there, they headed toward Birmingham, Alabama.

There was a stop at the Talladega Superspeedway, where the Bandit Runners were given a tour of the museum, a group photo and lunch. Then, a short drive brought them to their destination, the Year One Facility, for the annual Year One Experience, a three-day event.

The group in Atlanta totalled more than 100 Trans Ams and other cars. Local and national media was there to cover the event, and the Bandit Run was featured on Hot Rod TV and the DIY Network. To finish the weekend off, local Bandit Runner Tyler H gave the group a movie location tour around Atlanta, and visited some of the movie's most famous sites.
