= Speed Zone =

1989 film by Jim Drake

- Theatrical release poster
- Directed by: Jim Drake
- Written by: Michael Short
- Produced by: Murray Shostak
- Starring: Melody Anderson; Peter Boyle; Donna Dixon; John Candy; Eugene Levy; Tim Matheson; The Smothers Brothers; Shari Belafonte; Joe Flaherty; Matt Frewer; Mimi Kuzyk; Alyssa Milano; Brooke Shields; Carl Lewis
- Cinematography: Michael Condro; François Protat
- Edited by: Michael Economou
- Music by: David Wheatley
- Distributed by: Orion Pictures (United States); Vestron Pictures (International)
- Release date: April 21, 1989
- Running time: 90 minutes
- Country: United States
- Language: English
- Budget: $18 million
- Box office: $3 million

Speed Zone (also known as Cannonball Run III, Cannonball Fever, One for the Money, Speedzone Fever, Cannonball Run III: Speed Zone, and Cannonball Run III: One for the Money) is a 1989 American action comedy film set around an illegal cross-country race (inspired by the Cannonball Baker Sea-to-Shining-Sea Memorial Trophy Dash). The film is the third and final installment of the Cannonball Run trilogy and a sequel to The Cannonball Run (1981) and Cannonball Run II (1983). The plot follows the race sponsors, who must line up new contestants after the previous racers are all arrested before the race begins.

The film stars four alumni of SCTV: John Candy, Eugene Levy, Joe Flaherty and Don Lake. The cast also includes Donna Dixon, Matt Frewer, Tim Matheson, Mimi Kuzyk, Melody Anderson, Shari Belafonte, Dick and Tom Smothers, Peter Boyle, Alyssa Milano, John Schneider, Brooke Shields, Michael Spinks, Lee Van Cleef, Harvey Atkin, Brian George, Art Hindle, Louis Del Grande, Carl Lewis and Richard Petty.

== Plot ==
An assortment of people gather at a countryside inn in preparation for the infamous "Cannonball Run," an illegal three-day cross-country race from Washington, D.C. to Santa Monica where the winner and five runners-up will receive $1 million. However, the hot-headed Washington Chief of Police, Spiro T. Edsel, along with his long-suffering sidekick Whitman, arrests all of the drivers to prevent the race from happening. As a result, sponsors must find replacement drivers by the next day.

Leo Ross, seeing that his old school rival, Charlie Cronan, has driving skills while working as a parking valet, bullies him into driving his BMW. Ross also persuades Charlie to bring along Tiffany, a dimwitted Marilyn Monroe-esque actress.

Vic DeRubis is a hitman-for-hire sent to kill Alec Stewart, an English deadbeat and compulsive gambler who has squandered money that he borrowed from a loan shark, Big Wally. Alec convinces Vic to ride with him, hoping to win the Cannonball Run and pay off Big Wally. They team up in a Jaguar XJS.

Lea Roberts and Margaret, MIT graduates into electronics and gadgets, are tempted by the prize money and the challenge and enter the race. They take over a Ferrari Daytona Spyder by trapping Ferrari representative Gus Gold in the car, stunt-driving it, and refusing to let him out until he agrees to let them drive it in the race.

When Donato, the driver of the Lamborghini is arrested, a skittish Italian mechanic, Valentino Rosatti, is forced to drive it, but Flash, a former policeman who wants the money for his own reasons, takes the wheel.

Nelson and Randolph Van Sloan, two millionaires and the only drivers not arrested in the police sweep, enter in a Bentley Corniche convertible. They spend most of their time trying to secretly catch a flight to Los Angeles in order to win by cheating. However, the plane is hijacked during take off and the hijacker is subdued by the pilots, resulting in the plane overshooting the runway and going on to the highway.

Following the race are a pair of television reporters, Heather Scott and Jack O'Neill, who get so caught up in the action that they decide to race their Ford news van.

In hot pursuit is Edsel, who grows increasingly insane in his unsuccessful efforts to stop the racers. Edsel and his men manage to arrest Vic and Alec, who quickly escape and steal the police car. Edsel and Whitman chase after them in their Jaguar.

At the race conclusion, Edsel and Whitman inadvertently win the Cannonball Run by driving the Jaguar across the finish line at Santa Monica Pier first, crashing it into the awaiting line of police cars—saving Alec, because as he points out to Vic; the winner is the car, not the driver—followed by Vic and Alec in their stolen police car. Flash and Valentino with the Lamborghini came second, Charlie and Tiffany driving the BMW finish third, Lea and Margaret fourth, Heather and Jack fifth, and the Van Sloan brothers coming in last while riding on roller skis.

The ending credits features the cast playfully driving bumper cars.

== Cast ==
- Melody Anderson as Lea Roberts
- Peter Boyle as Metro Police Chief Spiro T. Edsel
- Donna Dixon as Tiffany
- John Candy as Charlie Cronan
- Eugene Levy as Leo Ross
- Tim Matheson as Jack O'Neill
- Dick Smothers as Nelson Van Sloan
- Tom Smothers as Randolph Van Sloan
- Shari Belafonte as Margaret
- Joe Flaherty as Vic DeRubis
- Matt Frewer as Alec Stewart
- Mimi Kuzyk as Heather Scott
- Jamie Farr as Sheik Abdul Ben Falafel
- Don Lake as Whitman
- Alyssa Milano as Lurleen
- John Schneider as Donato
- Brooke Shields as Stewardess / Herself
- Michael Spinks as Bachelor / Himself
- Lee Van Cleef as Grandfather
- Harvey Atkin as Gus Gold
- Brian George as Valentino Rosatti
- Art Hindle as "Flash"
- Louis Del Grande as Mr. Benson
- Carl Lewis as Jogger / Himself
- Richard Petty as Himself (uncredited)

Jamie Farr cameos as Sheik Abdul Ben Falafel, who says in an interview that he is retiring from racing. Farr is the only cast member from The Cannonball Run & Cannonball Run II to reprise his role in the film.

John Schneider makes a cameo as Donato, the driver of the Lamborghini Countach in the opening scene while being chased by an assortment of police cars, and is seen wearing an orange racing suit with a Confederate flag on it, a nod to Bo Duke, The Dukes of Hazzard character Schneider played.

Lee Van Cleef, in one of his final appearances, is in the same scene playing an old man teaching his grandson (Jon Luvelli) how to skip stones on a pond as the Lamborghini drives past.

== Production ==
The film was shot in Quebec.

== Soundtrack ==
The soundtrack released by Grudge Records contains mostly rock and blues songs by various artists. Some of the songs were taken from an earlier driving-themed movie, Born to Race (1988).

1. Splash - "Dizzy Miss Lizzy"
2. Felix Cavaliere - "Roll Away"
3. James House - "Born To Race" (title song from Born to Race)
4. Denny Colt - "Good Guys Are Hard To Find"
5. David Wheatley - "Tiffany's Theme"
6. Richie Havens - "Drivin'"
7. Will To Power - "Dreamin'"
8. Rocky Burnette - "Perfect Crime" (from Born to Race)
9. Charlie Karp & The Name Droppers - "Breakin' Each Others Heart"
10. Omar & The Howlers - "Rattlesnake Shake"

== Reception ==
The film received negative reviews from critics and was nominated for three Golden Raspberry Awards including Worst Picture and Worst Director (Jim Drake), with Brooke Shields winning Worst Supporting Actress at the 10th Golden Raspberry Awards. The very brief cameo by Shields has her playing herself, saying that she hopes not to end up "doing bit parts in movies". Chicago film critic Roger Ebert gave the film zero stars in his review for the Chicago Sun-Times:

Read my lips. Cars are not funny. Speeding cars are not funny. It is not funny when a car spins around and speeds in the other direction. It is not funny when a car flies through the air. It is not funny when a truck crashes into a car. It is not funny when cops chase speeding cars. It is not funny when cars crash through roadblocks. None of those things are funny. They have never been funny.

Ebert's colleague Gene Siskel also gave a harsh review to this film—he said "it is an atrocious excuse for entertainment. If I have a pet peeve about movies is that they are so venal that don't even try to be good. That's Speed Zone".

Audiences polled by CinemaScore gave the film an average grade of "D+" on an A+ to F scale.

Speed Zone holds a 0% rating on Rotten Tomatoes based on five reviews.

== Home media ==
The film was released in North America on VHS in 1990 by Media Home Entertainment. It was also issued on laserdisc by Image Entertainment (#ID7192ME) for American and Canadian markets in 1990. In Japan, the film was released on laserdisc by Towa-Pioneer and packaged as The Cannonball Run III: Speed Zone. The Japanese disc release did not feature an on-screen title card The Cannonball Run III, but carried the same Speed Zone title card as found in the North American release.
