= Brock Yates =

American motorsport journalist (1933–2016)

- Born: Brock Wendel Yates; October 21, 1933; Lockport, New York, U.S.
- Died: October 5, 2016 (aged 82); Batavia, New York, U.S.
- Education: Hobart College
- Occupations: Journalist, author
- Spouse: Pamela Yates
- Children: 3
- Writing career
- Genres: Journalism, screenwriting

Brock Yates (October 21, 1933 – October 5, 2016) was a prominent American journalist, TV commentator, TV reporter, screenwriter, and author. He was the longtime executive editor at Car and Driver magazine—and contributed to The Washington Post, Playboy, The American Spectator, Boating, Vintage Motorsports, as well as other publications.

With a journalism career spanning six decades, Yates' work was highlighted by often irreverent and incisive industry critiques—including a 1968 analysis in Car and Driver titled The Gross Pointe Myopians, on which he expanded for his 1983 book, The Decline and Fall of the American Automotive Industry.

Yates was widely known for co-conceiving and then executing the first non-stop, cross-country Cannonball Baker Sea-to-Shining-Sea Memorial Trophy Dash, widely known as The Cannonball Run, in 1971—which subsequently gave rise to his screenwriting career. He co-wrote the 1980 film, Smokey and the Bandit II. For his reporting and racing participation, he was inducted into the Motorsports Hall of Fame of America, in 2017.

Writing for Motor Trend, noted automotive writer Steven Cole Smith, said Yates was a "prolific, iconic, profane, brilliant, pioneering writer" and "called him the first superstar automotive writer."

== Background ==
Yates was the son of American author Raymond Francis Yates and the former Marguerite Wendel. He was born and raised in Lockport, New York and graduated from Lockport High School in 1951. Yates' first articles appeared in Science and Mechanics magazine when he was 16 years old. He graduated from Hobart College and spent time in the United States Navy.

Yates' 1955 marriage to Sally Kingsley ended in divorce. In the late 1970s, he married Pamela Reynolds. Yates lived variously in Western New York state, in Castile, the village of Wyoming, and Fairport.

First suffering from Alzheimer's disease in 2007, Yates died at the Veterans Affairs hospital in Batavia, New York, on October 5, 2016, from complications of the disease, sixteen days shy of his 83rd birthday. He was survived by his wife, Pamela, sons Brock Jr., and Daniel, a daughter, Claire Lilly, stepdaughter, Stacy Bradley and three grandchildren.

== Career ==
Yates was hired in 1964 as managing editor at Car and Driver magazine by the magazine's iconic editor, David E. Davis—who was noted for fostering an "atmosphere of creative turbulence." Yates later recalled, "little did [Davis] know that in fact I knew nothing about managing or editing." Four decades later (2006), he was fired by editor-in-chief Csaba Csere (as Yates himself noted) for being "too expensive."

On David E. Davis, Yates wrote:

"I hold the distinct honor of being the person David fired most in his long and storied career," Yates said. "We were tough, opinionated sons of bitches who often went head to head, but at our core we loved and respected each other." Although they always settled their spats, Yates would add fuel to the fire whenever possible. In 1994, he wrote: "Dave remains the grand old water buffalo of automotive journalism. To know him is to acknowledge his short fuse and penchant for unpredictable, snorting charges at friendly targets." Yates once called C/D’s then executive editor to report: "Dave’s on the hill behind my house, crawling on his stomach. He’s got a shotgun."

As a best-selling author, most frequently about automotive topics and motor sport, some of Yates' articles and commentaries for Car and Driver magazine and other publications have had considerable impact within the auto industry and general public. Beginning with his 1968 critique of the American auto industry, its management, and its products: "The Grosse Pointe Myopians," Yates established a recurring theme in his nonfiction work that American automotive management had grown arrogant, lost touch with its markets, and failed to respond to changing public needs/tastes, technology, and energy/environmental concerns. He developed the thesis in his 1983 book, The Decline and Fall of the American Automotive Industry—and followed up with his 1996 book The Critical Path:Inventing an Automobile and Reinventing a Corporation, a focused look at Chrysler' efforts to recast itself with development of its third generation minivans.

In 1976, Yates wrote the script for Free Wheelin', a minimally branded documentary about tricked-out conversion vans filmed at the National Street Van in July 1976, the “4th Annual "National Truck-In" get together in Bowling Green, Kentucky. Free Wheelin’ was released as a 21-minute film, as well as in shorter lengths, to be played as a short or trailer in movie theaters.

As a pit reporter for CBS, Yates covered certain NASCAR Cup Series (at the time, the Winston Cup) series races in the 1980s, including the Daytona 500. He was also one of the main commentators on the TNN motor sports TV show American Sports Cavalcade with Steve Evans where, on occasion, Paul Page, Gary Gerould, and Ralph Sheheen appeared. He was a commentator on racing and vintage cars at various points between 1995 and 2013 for the Speed Channel, a U.S. cable affiliate of Fox Sports.

Yates wrote for The Truth About Cars briefly in January and February 2008.

== Cannonball Run ==
Yates was inspired by Erwin G. "Cannonball" Baker (1882–1960), who set several coast-to-coast records, to initiate the Cannonball Baker Sea-to-Shining-Sea Memorial Trophy Dash.

Conceived by Yates and fellow Car and Driver editor Steve Smith, the first run was intended both as a celebration of the United States Interstate Highway System and as a protest against strict traffic laws coming into effect at the time. Another motivation was the fun involved, which showed in the tongue-in-cheek reports in Car and Driver and other auto publications worldwide. The initial cross-country run was made by Yates; his son, Brock Yates Jr.; Steve Smith; and friend Jim Williams beginning on May 3, 1971, in a 1971 Dodge Custom Sportsman van called the "Moon Trash II."

The first competitive race was won by Brock and Formula One and Le Mans winner Dan Gurney in a Sunoco blue Ferrari 365 GTB/4 Daytona. The duo traveled from New York to Los Angeles in a then-record time of 35 hours, 54 minutes. In all, five Cannonballs were run between 1971 and 1979, although Yates never again won. The event was the inspiration for the 1976 movies Cannonball! and The Gumball Rally.

The event has continued on in the form of the Tire Rack One Lap of America Presented by Grassroots Motorsport Magazine. The event is now run by his son Brock Yates Jr. 2018 saw the 35th anniversary of the event.

== Screenwriting ==
Yates along with director and stuntman Hal Needham, wrote Smokey and the Bandit II (1980). Yates also wrote the screenplay for The Cannonball Run (1981) film with the intention of giving the lead role to Steve McQueen. However, McQueen was diagnosed with cancer early in 1980 and was unable to do the film, leading to the casting of Burt Reynolds. Yates had a brief cameo in The Cannonball Run as the race organizer who lays out the ground rules before the beginning of the race.

While Yates was not involved in them, The Cannonball Run was followed by one sequel using his characters, Cannonball Run II (1984), and a second sequel, Speed Zone (1989), which, apart from being about the race and a small cameo by Jamie Farr's character, had no other connections.

== Bibliography ==
- Against Death and Time: One Fatal Season in Racing's Glory Years
- — (August 2003). Cannonball! World's Greatest Outlaw Road Race. Motorbooks International. ISBN 978-0-7603-1633-7. OCLC 62175939. OL 8011277M.
- The Hot Rod: Resurrection of a Legend
- Enzo Ferrari: the man, the cars, the races
- The Critical Path: Inventing an Automobile and Reinventing a Corporation (1996)
- NASCAR Off the Record
- The Indianapolis 500: The Story of the Motor Speedway
- Racers and Drivers
- The Decline and Fall of the American Automobile Industry
- Sunday Driver
- Dead in the Water
- The Great Driver
- Guide to Racing Cars
- Outlaw Machine: Harley-Davidson and the Search For the American Soul
- Umbrella Mike: The True Story of the Chicago Gangster Behind the Indy 500
- Sports and Racing Cars (written with Raymond F. Yates)
