= The 2904 =

Endurance motor race

The 2904: Transcontinental Motorized Vehicular Tournament of Efficiency and Endurance, known commonly as The 2904 is an unofficial, endurance race from New York City to California. Conceived by John Ficarra, as a combination of the Cannonball Baker Sea-to-Shining-Sea Memorial Trophy Dash and the 24 Hours of LeMons.

== Overview ==
The main requirement for the challenge is to drive the 2,904 mi (4,674 km) distance from New York City to California for no more than $2904 including the vehicle, fuel, food, tolls, repairs, and tickets. Safety equipment such as tires, mandatory exterior lights, and seat belts are exempt from the budget.

The start is at the Redball Garage on East 31st Street in Manhattan where the original Cannonball began, and the finish has been at both Classic Cars West in San Francisco and at the Portofino Inn in Redondo Beach where the original Cannonball Baker Sea-to-Shining-Sea Memorial Trophy Dash finished.

== History ==
Conceived by John Ficarra, The 2904 arose as a response to the high-end “lifestyle” automotive rallies such as Bullrun and Gumball 3000. It also serves as a response to high-dollar coast to coast record attempts, as well as drawing inspiration from endurance events like The 24 Hours of LeMons and the original Cannonball Baker Sea-to-Shining-Sea Memorial Trophy Dash.

== Results ==
2017 - New York City to Redondo Beach

- Lone Rangers: 39 hours 1 minute (1983 Mercedes Benz 300D)
- Hazzard County Undercover: 40 hours 8 minutes (1974 Dodge Coronet)
- Broke Beaver Express: 40 hours 41 minutes (1993 Volvo 850 GLT)
- El Maverinos: 41 hours 30 minutes (1974 ford Maverick)
- Outlaw Moonshine Runners: 45 hours 35 minutes (1977 Chevrolet Camaro)
- Full Monte: 44 hours 25 minutes (1977 Chevrolet Monte)
- Shake and Bake: 47 hours 30 minutes (1993 Lincoln MK VIII)
- Cannonball Livery Enforcement: DNF (Mercedes CLK)

2015 - New York City to Redondo Beach

- Great White Whale: 32 hours 5 minutes (2002 Mercedes S55)
- Colonel Klunk: 32 hours 26 minutes
- P71 Blackturd: 33 hours 3 minutes (Ford Crown Vic)
- Kamikaze Subterfuge (Solo): 34 hours 33 minutes
- Moral Ambiguity (Solo): 35 hours 8 minutes
- The A-Way-Team: 36 hours 48 minutes (1995 Oldsmobile Silhouette)
- Dukes of Hoth: 43 hours 04 minutes (Ford Crown Vic)
- Omega Men: 44 hours 18 minutes (1987 Subaru Loyale)
- Golden Years / AWOL: DNF (1973 GMC Motorhome)
- Brown Noise: DNF (Audi A8)

2013 - New York City to Redondo Beach

- Cleveland Steamers (AKA Amish Anarchists): 36 hours, 27 minutes. (1993 Lincoln Town Car)
- No H8N: 37 hours, 29 minutes. (1999 Cadillac Funeral Limousine)
- Hal Needham's Ghost: 38 hours, 25 minutes. (1997 Ford Diesel Ambulance)
- OmegaRU: 42 hours, 33 minutes. (1985 Subaru Loyale Wagon)
- Tailpipes: 50 hours, 30 minutes. (1992 Chevrolet Cavalier, 2013 Hyundai Elantra - rental, 2013 Dodge Charger -rental)

2011 - New York City to San Francisco

- Collateral Racing Thrust (Solo): 40 hours, 25 minutes (1994 Mercury Grand Marquis)
- Wolverine's a Pimp: 43 hours, 3 minutes (1983 Jaguar XJ-S with Chevy V8)

2010 - New York City to San Francisco

- Civil Disobedience (Solo): 37 hours, 35 minutes (2001 Toyota Celica) Budget: $2413.67
- Amish Anarchists: 38 hours, 44 minutes (1989 Mercedes-Benz 560SEL) Budget: $2685.60
- Rustbucketeers: 40 hours, 4 minutes (1994 Buick Roadmaster Station Wagon) Budget: $1776.33
- The Griswolds: 47 hours, 32 minutes (1987 Oldsmobile 88 Custom Cruiser Station Wagon) Budget: $1326.75

2009 - New York City to San Francisco

- Team The A-Team: 37 hours, 8 minutes. (1984 GMC Van - Commando Spec) Budget: $2569.69
- Team Project Interceptor: 38 hours, 29 minutes (1999 Ford Crown Victoria - Police Spec) Budget: $2074.50
- Team Cookin' With-Gas: 43 hours, 15 minutes (1979 Lincoln Mark V Coupe) Budget $2200.03

2008 - New York City to San Francisco

- Team Creative Film Cars: 38 hours, 41 minutes (1996 Chevrolet Caprice Classic – Police Spec) Budget: 2659.14
- Team Flying Hellish AKA Stealth Bucket: 40 hours, 59 minutes (2000 Buick Regal LS) Budget: $1478.77
- Team CFC2, Electric Boogaloo: 41 hours, 9 minutes (1996 Ford Crown Victoria – Police Spec) Budget: $2437.24
- Team Wheels on Meals: 45 hours, 8 minutes (1995 Honda Accord) Budget: $1098.16
- Team Top Gear: 52 hours, 50 minutes (1995 Chevrolet Caprice Classic – Police Spec) Budget $2343.69

2007 - New York City to San Francisco

- Team Flying Hellfish: 37 hours, 54 minutes (1992 Volvo 740 Wagon) Budget: $1778.10
- Team Creative Film Cars: 40 hours, 8 minutes (1994 Subaru Loyale 4×4 Wagon) Budget: $1748.93
- Team Tailpipes: 46 hours, 41 minutes (1991 Subaru Loyale Sedan) Budget: $826.69
