= Australian Cannonball Cup =

The Australian Cannonball Cup was a car race held in 1984 on public roads between Melbourne and Perth, Australia.

Although the event was originally promoted as timed race with very few rules similar to the American Cannonball Run, after significant negative publicity the organizers insisted the event was a navigation and endurance rally and instituted a disqualification rule if drivers were caught by police for a driving offence. The entry fee was $550 per team, and first prize was $10,000. 76 teams had entered but a significant number pulled out prior to the start, leaving 33 teams to compete. The race started on Friday, 2 November 1984 at a private farm in Diggers Rest on the outskirts of Melbourne. Teams could choose any route but had to pass through two checkpoints. The first checkpoint was at Berri, South Australia and the second at Albany, Western Australia. The race was closely followed by police in all three states that it passed through. Many drivers were booked or arrested. Vehicles were checked for roadworthiness, some on more than one occasion, and at least one vehicle was ordered off the road in Western Australia. On Sunday 4 November the first team arrived at the finish in Fremantle, Western Australia, in 32 hours and 22 minutes.

Some weeks after the race the organizers disqualified the winning car due to the drivers having been caught by police for a driving offence. The second placed team was then awarded the win. No other disqualifications were announced, despite a significant number of other teams having been caught by police.

The race organizer suffered financial problems and no prize money was paid out. A second event was planned for 1985 but never ran.

== Results ==
Position	Entrant	Race Time
DQ	Charles Kovacs, Len Walsh	32h 22m 5s
1	John Hassard, Ian Bray, John Crowle	33h 4m 16s
2	Murray Buchan, Darryl Penley	33h 5m 0s
3	Andrew Csaszar, Russell Morton	33h 11m 17s
4	Graham Collins, Robert Harvey, Don Ogilvie	33h 33m 44s
5	Warrick Jacobson, Ron Flanigan	33h 57m 13s
6	Ron Reid, Robert Pollit, Chris Ohlin	34h 6m 57s
7	Peter Martin, Lindsay Williams, Robert Shanahan	34h 15m 25s
8	Wayne Haw, Allan Fielding, Jeff Haire	34h 36m 59s
9	Carlo Aloi, Ted Camilleri	34h 46m 26s
10	Phil Hansen, Scott Sieger	35h 9m 34s
11	Leigh Cohen, Graham Callaghan	35h 23m 32s
12	Neville French, Jim Fernance, Simon Fraser	35h 36m 31s
13	Barbara Langshaw, Mark Kent	35h 57m 41s
14	Jerry Reinisch, Jerry Revay, Lucas Hagan	36h 1m 32s
15	Ken Hourigan, Philip Hourigan	36h 2m 38s
16	Peter Pearce, Geoff ?, Gary Colton	36h 19m 49s
17	Jock Calder, Jim Rosenthal, Rob Tolano	36h 22m 23s
18	Robert Paterno, Alfio Paterno	36h 59m 44s
19	Geoff Muclahy, Paul Mulcahy, Bill Mulcahy	36h 59m 57s
20	Indo Saarelaht, Heino Saarelaht, Kurt Seeberg	37h 33m 19s
21	Steven Swan, Noel Dey	38h 33m 27s
22	Gerald Brown, Les Dean	38h 33m 28s
23	Peter Dale, Andrew Fraser, Gerard Ellis	39h 21m 49s
24	Andre Razums, Lance Dickinson, Steven Mears	39h 33m 33s
25	Joe Cincotta, Tim Nolan	40h 17m 45s
26	John Gregory, Axel Tworowsky	40h 57m 44s
DNF	Walter (Butch) Hollier, Greg Bailey	
DNF	Rick Illes, Robert Altarac	
DNF	Alan Squires, Rick Wilcox	
DNF	Graham Stevenson, Chris Colangelo	
DNF	David Westbury, David Krant, Darren Mcmullen	
DNF	Ray Ellis, James Maude	
