= Ferrari Daytona =

Ferrari 365 GTB/4 and GTS/4 "Daytona"
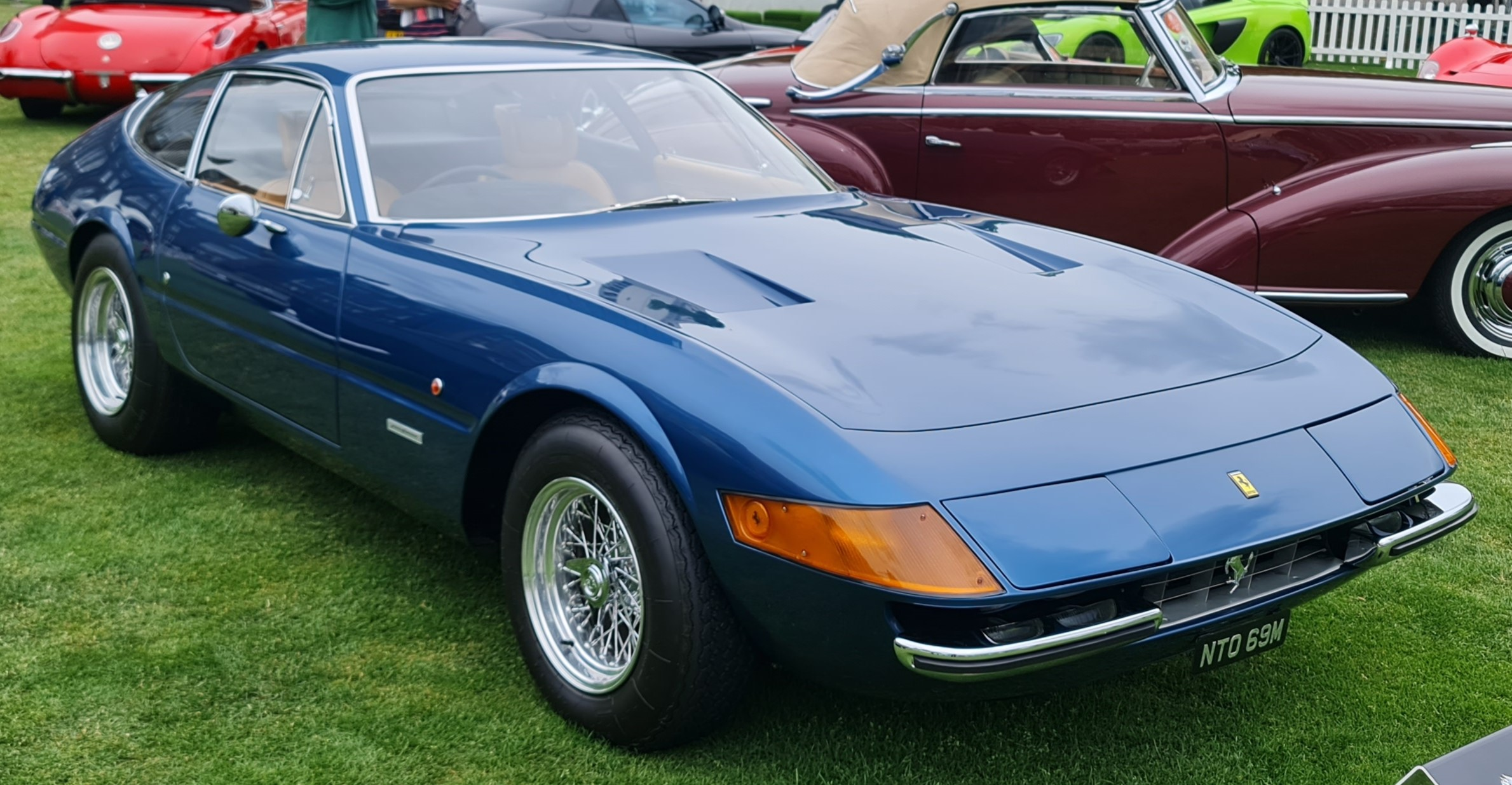
- 1973 Ferrari 365 GTB/4

Overview
- Manufacturer: Ferrari
- Production: GTB/4: 1968–1973 (1,284 produced); GTS/4: 1971–1973 (122 produced)
- Assembly: Italy: Maranello
- Designer: Leonardo Fioravanti at Pininfarina

Body and chassis
- Class: Grand tourer
- Body style: GTB/4: berlinetta; GTS/4: spider
- Layout: Front-mid engine, rear wheel drive

Powertrain
- Engine: 4.4 L (4390.35 cc) Tipo 251 Colombo V12
- Transmission: 5-speed manual

Dimensions
- Wheelbase: 2,400 mm (94.5 in)
- Length: 4,425 mm (174.2 in)
- Width: 1,760 mm (69.3 in)
- Height: 1,245 mm (49.0 in)
- Kerb weight: 1,200 kg (2,646 lb) (GTB/4, dry)

Chronology
- Predecessor: GTB/4: Ferrari 275 GTB/4; GTS/4: Ferrari 365 GTS
- Successor: GTB/4: Ferrari 365 GT4 BB; GTB/4 "Daytona": Ferrari 550 Maranello

The Ferrari Daytona is a two-seat grand tourer produced by Ferrari from 1968 to 1973. It was introduced at the Paris Auto Salon in 1968 to replace the 275 GTB/4, and featured the 275's Colombo V12 with a larger cylinder bore for 4,390 cc (4.4 L; 267.9 cu in). It was offered in berlinetta and spyder forms. The car came in two variants: the 365 GTB/4 coupe, and the 365 GTS/4 convertible.

The Daytona was succeeded by the mid-engined 365 GT4 Berlinetta Boxer in 1973.

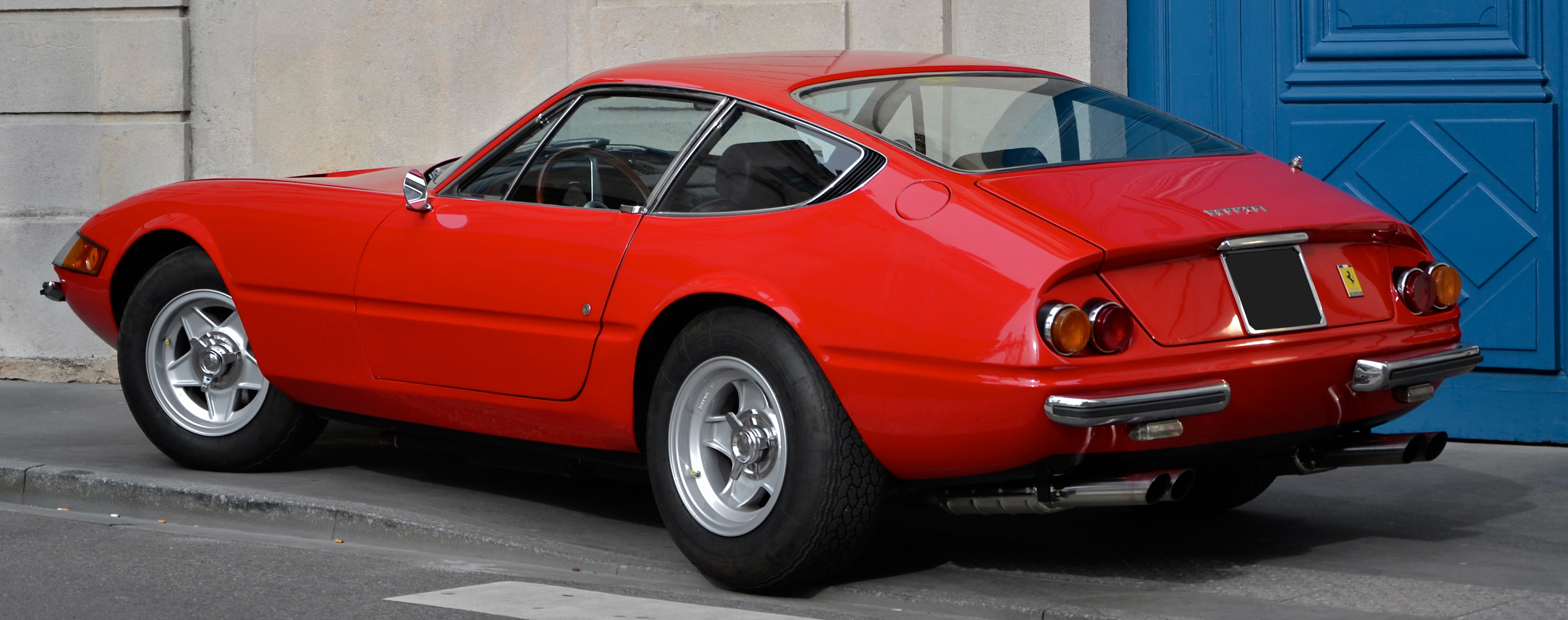
Rear three-quarters view of a 365 GTB/4

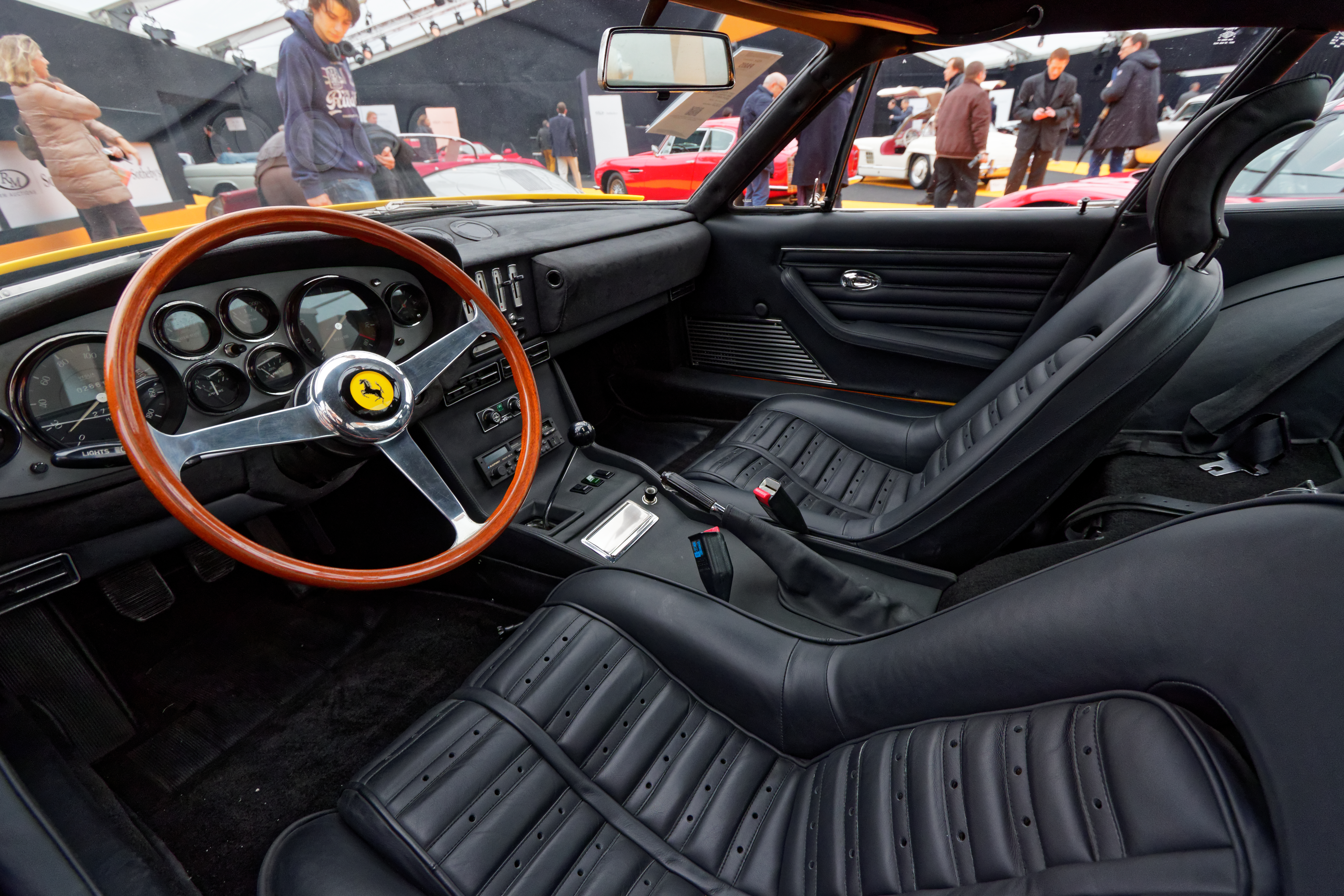
1971 Ferrari 365 GTB/4 interior

== Name ==
The unofficial Daytona name is reported to have been applied by the media rather than Ferrari and commemorates Ferrari's 1-2-3 finish in the February 1967 24 Hours of Daytona with a 330 P3/4, a 330 P4 and a 412 P. To this day, Ferrari itself only rarely refers to the 365 as the "Daytona", and refers to it as an "unofficial" name.

== Specifications ==
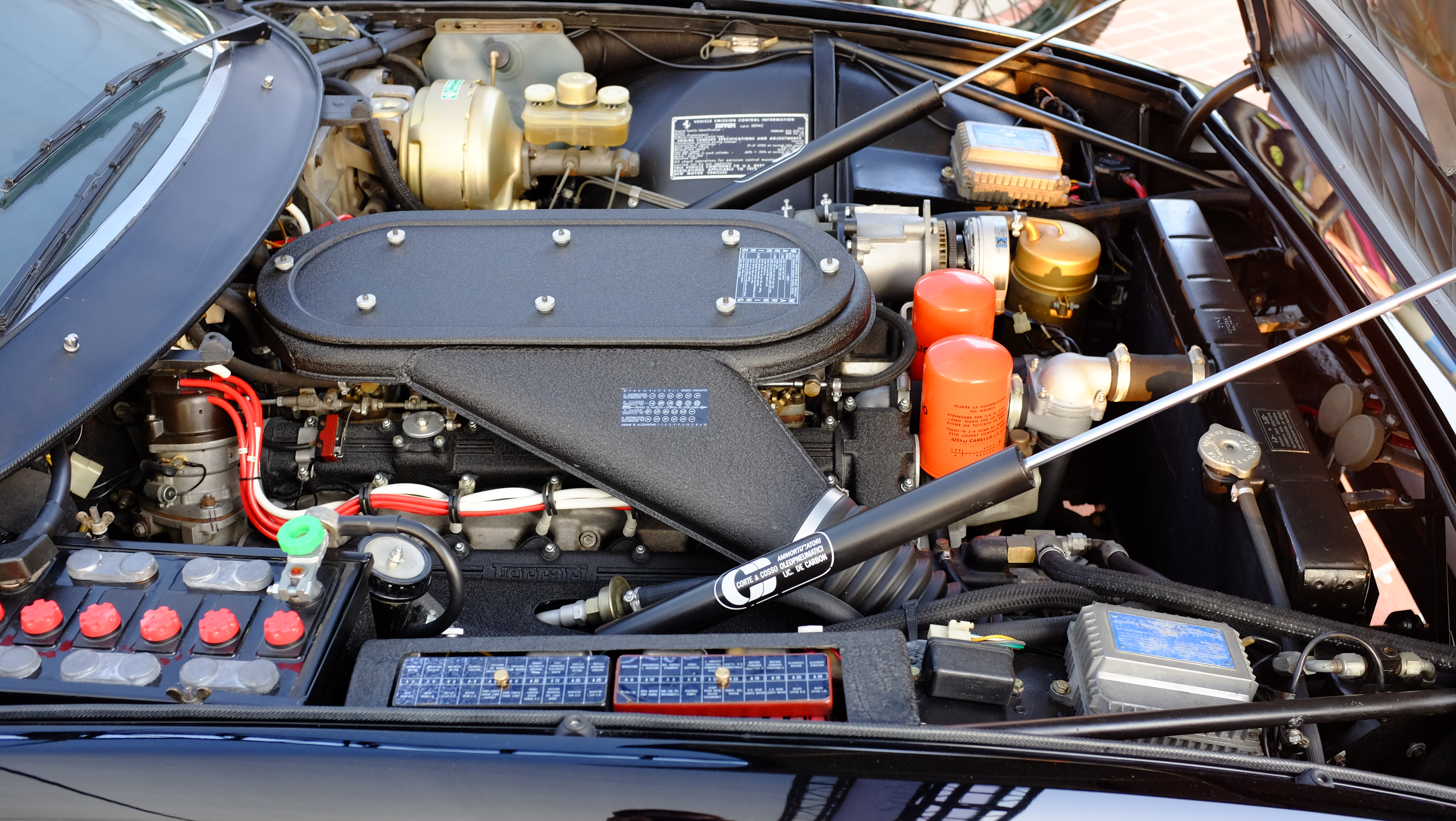
Engine compartment of a 1973 Ferrari 365 GTB/4 Daytona, USA version

Unlike Lamborghini's then-new, mid-engined Miura, the Daytona was a traditional front-engined, rear-drive car. The engine, known as the Tipo 251 and developed from the earlier Colombo V12 with a 60° bank angle used in the 275 GTB/4, was a DOHC 2 valves per cylinder 4,390 cc (4.4 L; 267.9 cu in), 365 cc (22.3 cu in) per cylinder, bore x stroke 81 mm × 71 mm (3.19 in × 2.80 in), featuring 6X2 barrel 40 DCN/20 Weber carburetors (40 mm Solex twin carburettors were used alternatively). At a compression ratio of 9.3:1, it produced 259 kW (352 PS; 347 hp) at 7500 rpm and a maximum torque of 431 N⋅m; 318 lbf⋅ft (44 kg⋅m) at 5500 rpm. This allowed it to reach a top speed of 280 km/h (174 mph) and accelerate from 0-60 mph (97 km/h) in 5.4 seconds. For the American version, slight modifications were made—the compression ratio was reduced to 8.8:1 and the exhaust system was equipped with a large central silencer, necessitating visible alterations to the primary pipes.

The five-speed manual transmission (of the transaxle concept) was mounted in the rear for optimal weight distribution, and a four-wheel independent suspension featured wishbones and coil springs.

== Styling ==
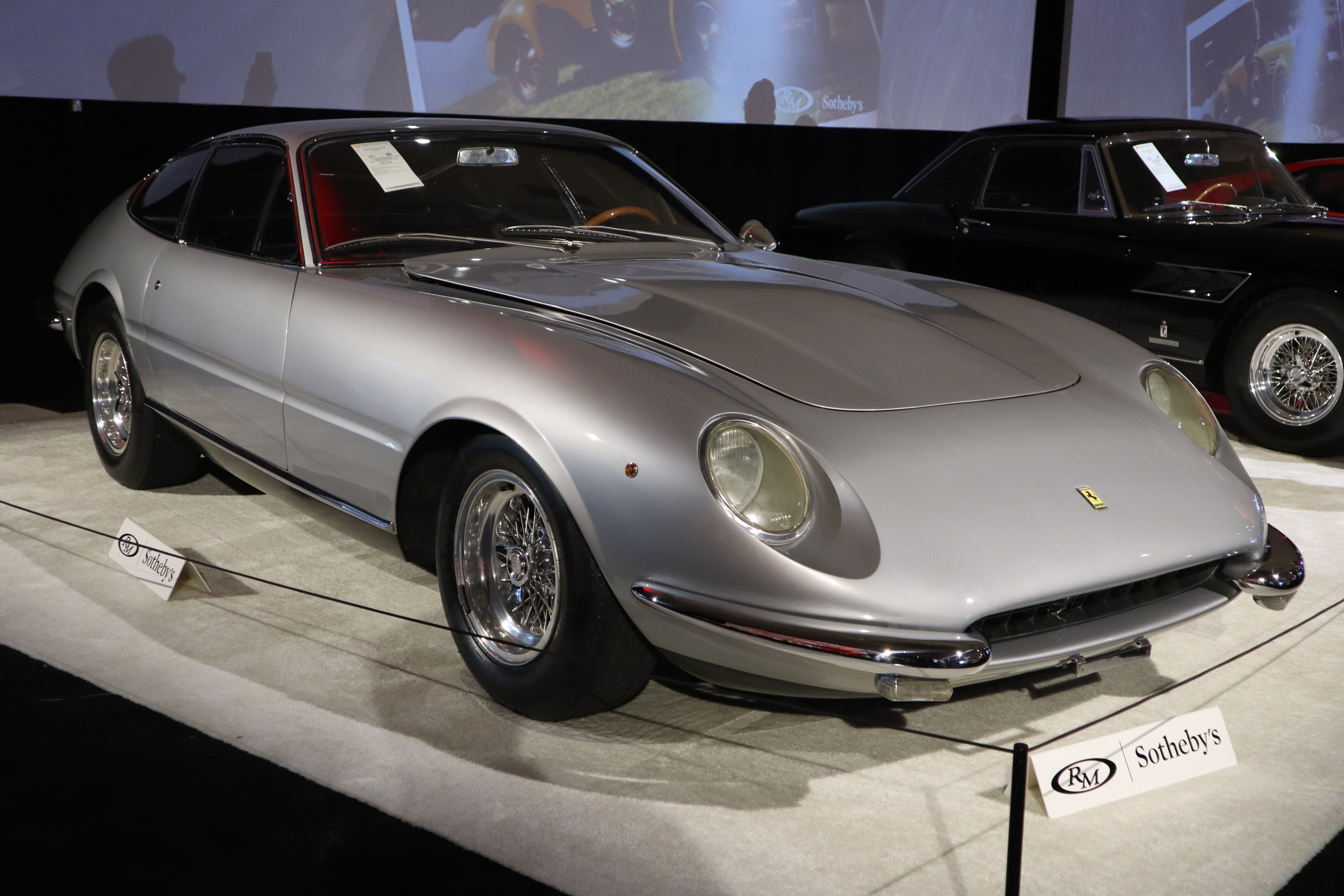
1968 Ferrari 365 GTB/4, second prototype chassis 11001.

Pininfarina designer Leonardo Fioravanti, who had previously worked on the Dino Ferrari's styling, was responsible for the 365 GTB/4. It reflected a movement from Ferrari's traditional rounded designs to a more contemporary, sharp-edged look.

Early Daytonas featured fixed headlights behind an acrylic glass cover. A new U.S. safety regulation banning headlights behind covers resulted in retractable pop-up twin headlights in 1971.

== Model variations ==
=== 365 GTB/4 and GTS/4 ===
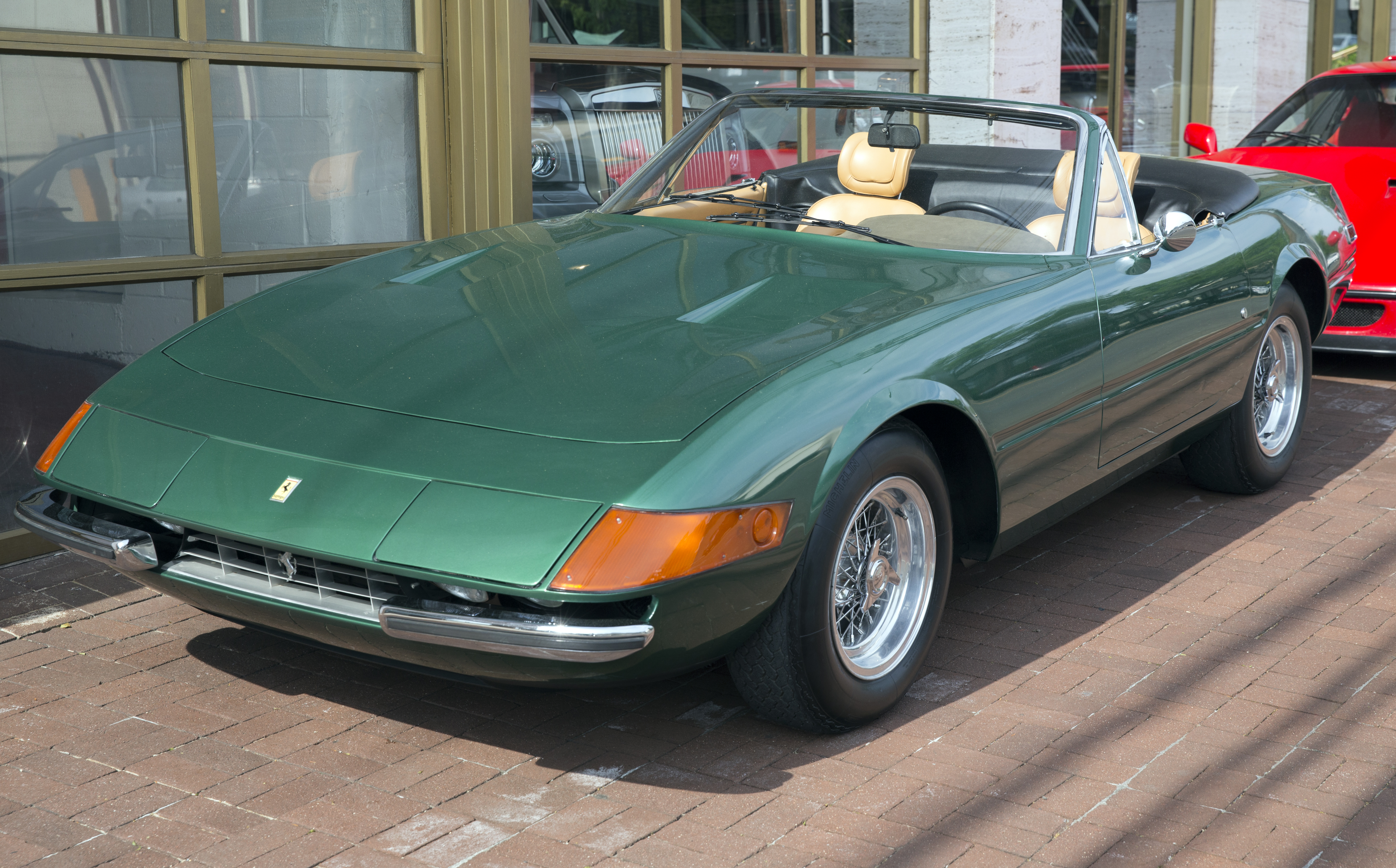
A 1973 Ferrari 365 GTS/4 (US-spec), one of only two Spyders finished in Verde Pino (Pine Green)

The generally accepted total number of Daytonas from the Ferrari club historians is 1,406 over the life of the model. This figure includes 156 UK right-hand-drive coupés, 122 factory-made spyders (of which 7 are right hand drive), and 15 competition cars. The competition cars are divided into three series, all with modified lightweight bodies and in various degrees of engine tune. All bodies except the first Pininfarina prototype were produced by Italian coachbuilder Scaglietti, which already had a well established record of working with Ferrari.

Historically, and especially since the mid-1980s and early 1990s, there has mostly been a considerable market price difference between a real berlinetta and a real spyder. Many berlinettas were turned into spyders by aftermarket mechanics, often to increase the car's monetary value or simply because of the owner's preference for an open car. Differences in value have typically remained, however, even after the most skillful conversions.

== Coachbuilt derivatives ==
=== 365 GTB/4 Shooting Brake ===
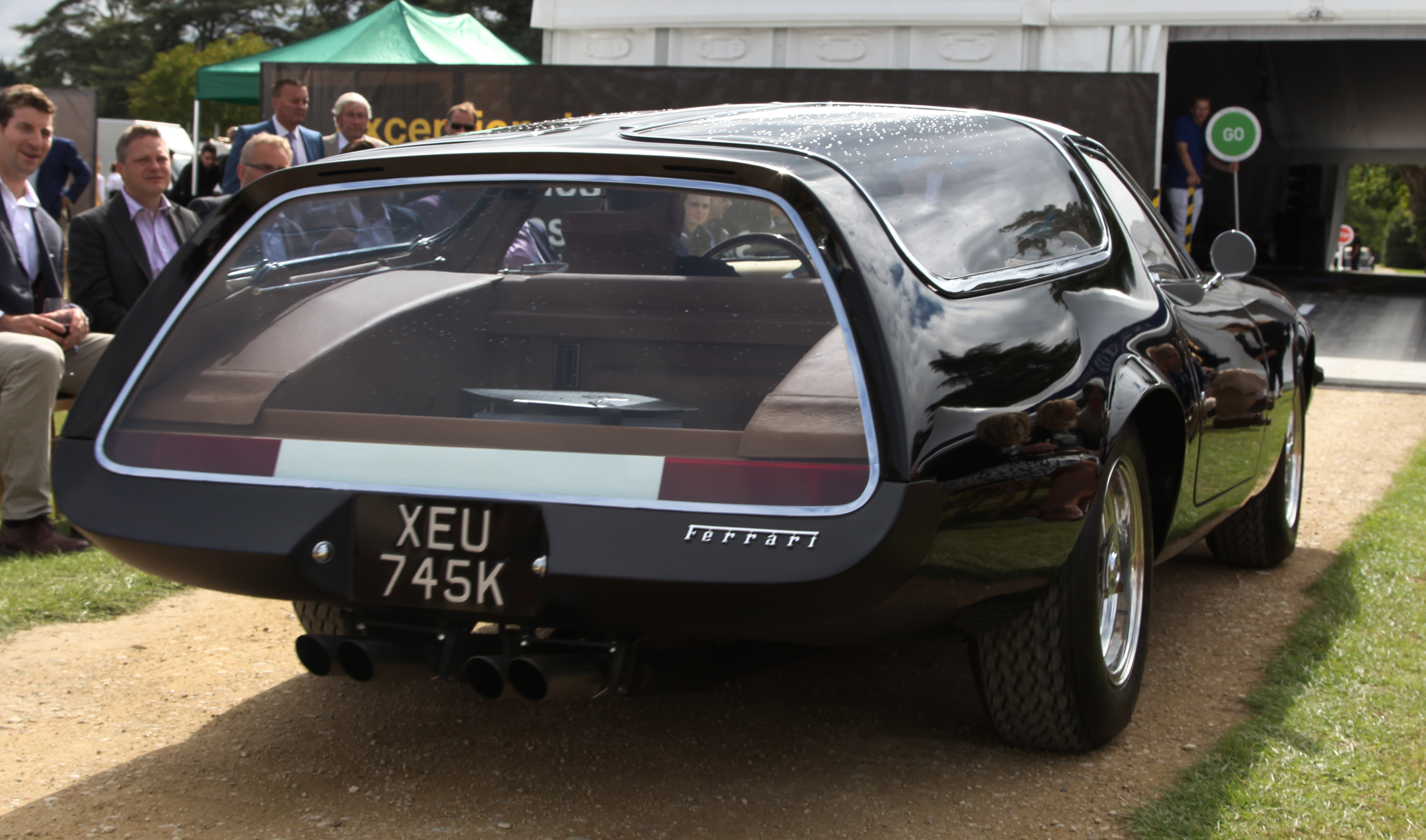
365 GTB/4 Shooting Brake

The stock 365 GTB/4 was delivered new to Philadelphia-area Ferrari dealer Chinetti-Garthwaite Motors as the 805th 365 GTB/4 produced with chassis no. 15275. It was there that architect Bob Gittleman asked Luigi Chinetti Jr. to design a unique car for him. Mr. Chinetti had already designed a Ferrari 330 GT 2+2 modified by Vignale and decided to design a shooting brake. The car was then sent to Surrey in England where Panther Westwinds built the car according to Mr. Chinetti's designs. The car was listed at Gooding and Co's 2016 Pebble Beach auction with less than 4,500 miles and an $750,000 - $1,000,000 estimate. The car didn't sell then.

== Competition versions ==
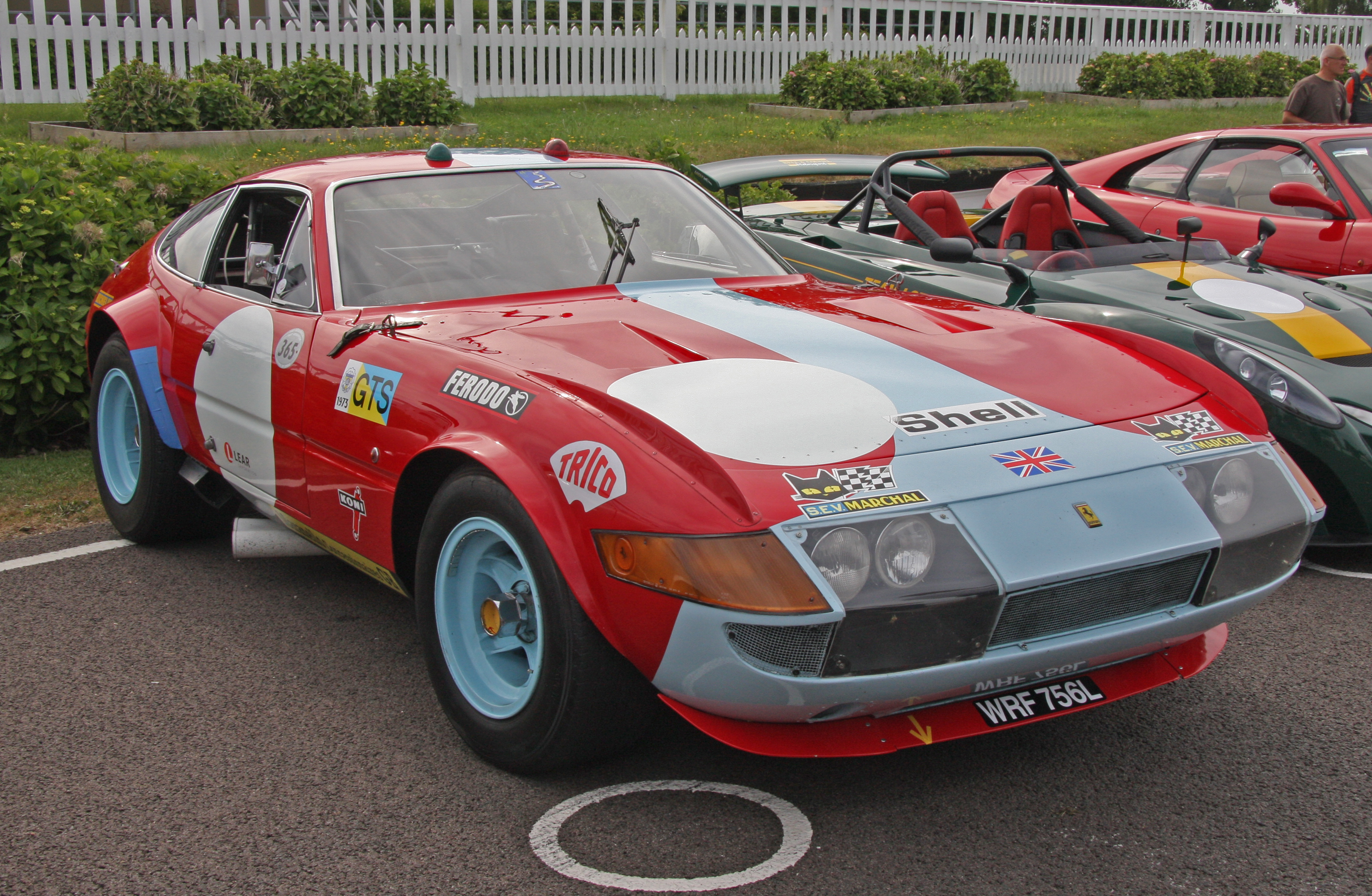
Ferrari 365 GTB/4 Competizione

The first racing version of the 365GTB/4 was prepared in 1969: an aluminium bodied car was built and entered in the Le Mans 24-hour race that year (the car crashed in practice). Ferrari did not produce an official competition car until late in 1970.

1972 Ferrari Daytona LM at Goodwood Festival of Speed 2010

The official cars were built in three batches of five cars each, in 1970–1, 1972 and 1973. They all featured a lightweight body making use of aluminium and fibreglass panels, with plexiglas windows. The engine was unchanged from the road car in the first batch of competition cars, but tuned in the latter two batches (to 400 bhp (298 kW; 406 PS) in 1972 and then around 450 bhp (336 kW; 456 PS) in 1973).

The cars were not raced by the official Scuderia Ferrari team, but by a range of private entrants. They enjoyed particular success in the 24 Hours of Le Mans, with results including a 5th overall in 1971, followed by GT class wins in 1972, 1973 and 1974. In 1972 Ferrari 365 GTB/4s took the first 5 places of the GT class.

The final major success of the car was in 1979 (five years after production ended), when a 1973 car achieved a class victory (2nd overall) in the 24 Hours of Daytona.

== Legacy ==
In 1971, the Daytona gained fame when one was driven by Dan Gurney and Brock Yates in the inaugural Cannonball Baker Sea-to-Shining-Sea Memorial Trophy Dash. Showcasing the car's potential for sustained high speed travel, the pair won with an average speed of 80.1 miles per hour (129 km/h), completing the distance from New York City to L.A.—2,876 miles (4,628 km)—in 35 hours 54 minutes. Gurney was later quoted as saying "We never once exceeded 175 miles per hour."

It appears on the cover of 1973's Now & Then, the fifth studio album of the American pop band The Carpenters.

It is driven (and crashed) by the "Kris Kristofferson" character in the 1976 version of the movie A Star is Born.

A Ferrari Daytona is used in an Across America race by the team of Steve Smith (Tim McIntire) and Franco Bertollini (Raul Julia) in the 1976 movie, The Gumball Rally

Corvette-based replica of a Daytona Spyder used in Miami Vice

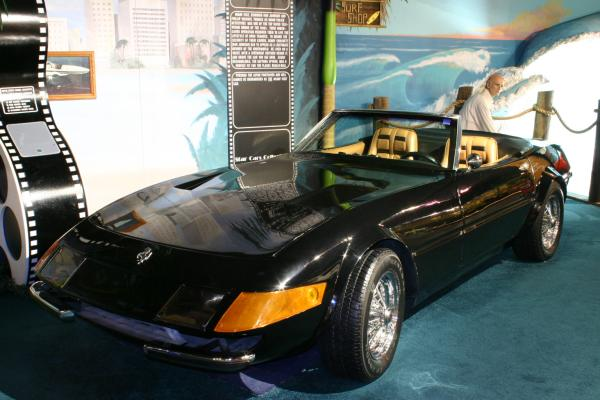

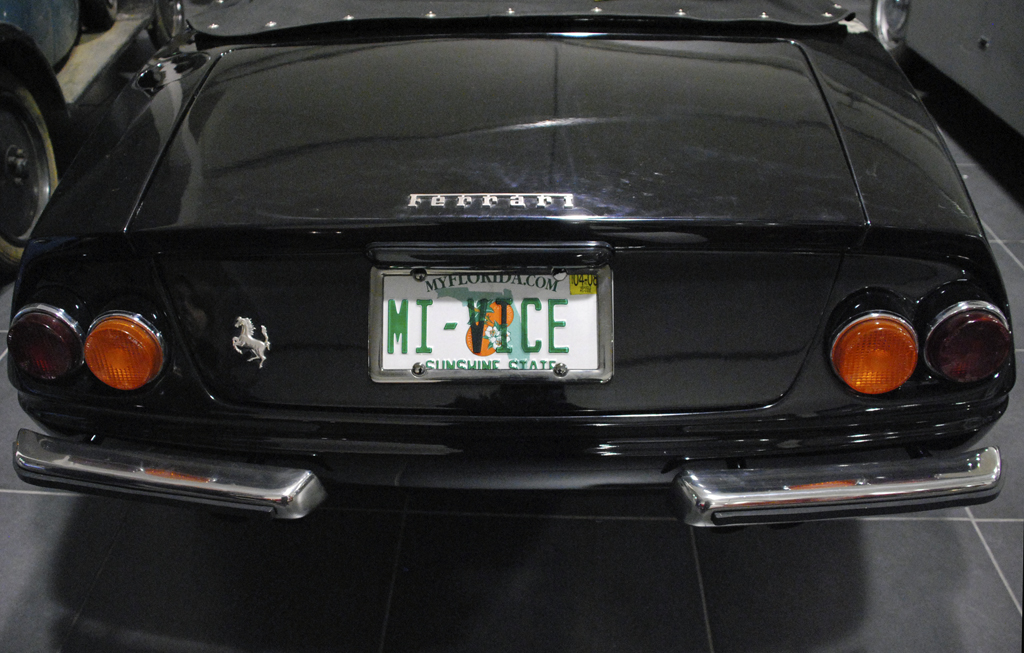

In the 1980s, a Daytona replica was prominently featured on the first two seasons of NBC's hit television series Miami Vice. The black car seen in early episodes was a kit car built on a Corvette C3 chassis. Altogether, two nearly identical cars were used simultaneously in the production of the TV series. Ferrari was not pleased that its company and one of their products was represented on TV by an imitation car and sued the manufacturer of the kit for trademark infringement and trademark dilution. The Daytona replicas were retired at the beginning of the show's third season and replaced by two Ferrari-donated Testarossas, the company's newest flagship model at the time.

In 2004, the Daytona was voted top sports car of the 1970s by Sports Car International magazine. Similarly, Motor Trend Classic named the 365 GTB/4 and GTS/4 as number two in their list of the ten "Greatest Ferraris of all time".

In 2024, Ferrari unveiled the Ferrari 12Cilindri, the design of which was a tribute to the 365 GTB/4 Daytona.

== See also ==
- Bizzarrini Strada
- De Tomaso Mangusta
- Iso Grifo
- Lamborghini Miura
- Maserati Ghibli
