= Cannonball Baker Sea-to-Shining-Sea Memorial Trophy Dash =

Unsanctioned 1970s automobile race

The Cannonball Baker Sea-to-Shining-Sea Memorial Trophy Dash, widely known as the Cannonball Baker or Cannonball Run, was an unofficial, unsanctioned automobile race run five times in the 1970s from New York City and Darien, Connecticut, on the East Coast of the United States to the Portofino Inn in the Los Angeles suburb of Redondo Beach, California. The Cannonball Run races have additionally inspired numerous contemporary efforts by independent teams to set the record time for the route, known as the Cannonball Run Challenge. The races were named after Erwin Baker.

Conceived by car magazine writer and auto racer Brock Yates and fellow Car and Driver editor Steve Smith, the first run was not a competitive race as only one team was running. The run was intended both as a celebration of the United States Interstate Highway System and as a protest against strict traffic laws coming into effect at the time. Another motivation was the fun involved, which showed in the tongue-in-cheek reports in Car and Driver and other auto publications worldwide. The initial cross-country run was made by Yates; his son, Brock Yates Jr.; Steve Smith; and friend Jim Williams beginning on May 3, 1971, in a 1971 Dodge Custom Sportsman van called the "Moon Trash II".

The race was run four more times: November 15, 1971; November 13, 1972; April 23, 1975; and April 1, 1979.

Car and Driver magazine detailed the November 1971 running in its March 1972 issue. That article was reprinted to represent the 1970s on the magazine's 50th anniversary in 2005. A remarkable effort was made by American racing legend Dan Gurney, winner of the 1967 24 hours of Le Mans. He won the second Cannonball in a Sunoco blue Ferrari 365 GTB/4 Daytona. Gurney said, "At no time did we exceed 175 mph [280 km/h]." He and Brock Yates as co-driver took 35 hours 54 minutes to travel 2,863 miles (4,608 km) at an average of approximately 80 mph (130 km/h) while collecting one fine. Snow in the Rocky Mountains slowed them down considerably.

In 1972 the team of Steve "Yogi" Behr, Bill Canfield, and Fred Olds won in a Cadillac Coupe de Ville, the first American car to win a Cannonball.

On April 23–25, 1975, Jack May and Rick Cline drove a Dino 246 GTS from the Red Ball Garage in New York City in a record time of 35 hours 53 minutes, averaging 83 mph (134 km/h).

The record for official Cannonballs is 32 hours 51 minutes (about 87 mph or 140 km/h), set in the final run from Darien, Connecticut, to Los Angeles by Dave Heinz and Dave Yarborough in a Jaguar XJ-S in April 1979.

After the original Cannonball races, Car and Driver sponsored legitimate closed-course tours, the One Lap of America. Outlaw successors in the United States, Europe, and Australia continue to use the Cannonball name without Yates' approval.

== The race ==
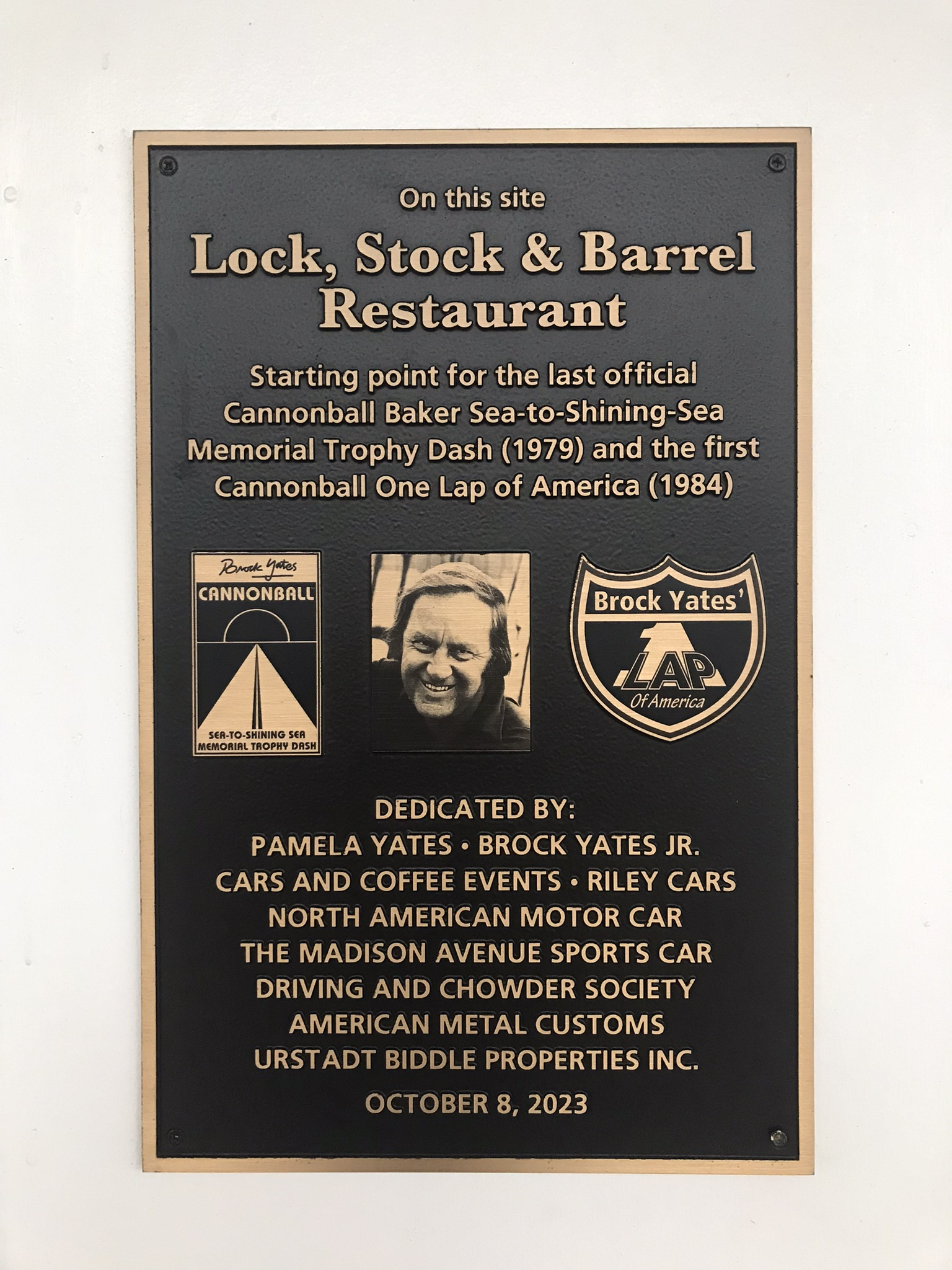
Commemorative plaque displayed at Old Kings Market (formerly Goodwives Shopping Center) in Darien, Connecticut

The object of the Cannonball was to leave the Red Ball Garage on East 31st Street in Manhattan, New York City (1979: Darien, Connecticut, at the now-defunct Lock, Stock, and Barrel restaurant, Goodwives Shopping Center), typically after midnight, and drive to the Portofino Inn in Redondo Beach, California, in the shortest time possible. Those were the only rules.

Nothing was specified as to the route, type of vehicle, number of drivers or crew, or maximum speed permitted. There was a gentlemen's agreement that the vehicle entered would be driven the entire distance (not transported on another vehicle, not abandoned for an identical second vehicle hidden near the finish, etc.) Speeding citations received along the way were the driver's responsibility and did not disqualify the vehicle, although stopping to receive a ticket increased the vehicle's overall time.

The Cannonball Run was technically a race in that the team with the fastest time was declared the "winner" and the results were announced in order of time. However, times were not taken very seriously, and sheer speed did not guarantee a first-place finish.

== Inspiration ==
The Cannonball Run gained notoriety after the 1972 run, but the Time story on the 1975 Jack May-Rick Cline race solidified its place in the public consciousness. To the surprise of many, the hilarious reports in Car and Driver were warmly received by press and public alike rather than condemned for the race's recklessness.

In his Cannonball! memoir, Yates reports that in 1972 an all-female team of Peggy Niemcek, Judy Stropus, and SCCA racer Donna Mae Mims ("The Pink Lady") suffered a crash near El Paso, Texas, resulting in a DNF (did not finish). Mims explains that their Cadillac stretch limousine veered off the road and rolled over after the driver fell asleep at the wheel. Although the car was destroyed and she suffered a broken arm, no other vehicles were involved in the crash. This was the only serious accident in the official Cannonball races.

Yates began working on a screenplay to be entitled Coast to Coast but was scooped by two "unofficial" films in 1976, Cannonball and The Gumball Rally. Eventually, an "official" Cannonball Run film was made, The Cannonball Run starring Burt Reynolds, Roger Moore and Dom DeLuise with Yates in a cameo appearance. Two sequels, Cannonball Run II and Speed Zone, also known as Cannonball Fever, followed. A later USA Network television program, Cannonball Run 2001, was given official approval to use the name.

== U.S. Express ==
After the last Cannonball, Rick Doherty, a veteran of the 1975 and 1979 races, organized a successor, the U.S. Express (1980–1983). The 1980 U.S. Express ran from Brooklyn, New York, to the beach in Santa Monica. Doherty won the first U.S. Express with co-driver and famous game designer Will Wright at the wheel of a Mazda RX-7. Their time was 33 hours 9 minutes.

In 1981 the U.S. Express ran from Long Island, New York, to Emeryville, California, which borders Oakland at the east end of the San Francisco–Oakland Bay Bridge). Interstate 80 was largely the route of choice. The winning team in 1981 was the first-time Express team of David Morse and Steve Clausman driving Morse's gray Porsche 928. One unique road hazard in the 1981 run was an early snowfall that closed the Donner Pass for several hours to vehicles without chains just as the U.S. Express cars approached. The Porsche 928, which carried special plastic chains, was able to proceed. Others had to wait for the pass to open. The Morse-Clausman team competed again the next two years. In 1982 (also to Emeryville), they endured several memorable police stops. In the final U.S. Express in 1983 to Newport Beach, California, they placed second.

Although longer than the Cannonball, the fastest time recorded for the U.S. Express was 32 hours 7 minutes in the 1983 race, 44 minutes faster than the fastest Cannonball, and the "official" cross-country record until it was broken in 2006 by Alex Roy and David Maher in 31 hours 4 minutes.

== Legacy ==
Decades after the last official Cannonball in 1979, issues raised and revival possibilities interested some motorists. Yates recalled declining offers to revive the concept because it was unworkable. His reasons included: increased police activity, increased legal liabilities for any organizer, increased year-round traffic, and expanding urban areas. He also warned of the obvious dangers of a race on public roads.

The Gumball 3000 gained publicity in the early 2000s as a similar event, sometimes held on coast-to-coast U.S. routes, but paced over a route several times as long and with no time-based winner.

The unofficial transcontinental record, known as the Cannonball Run Challenge, has been broken numerous times since the last official Cannonball Trophy Dash.

=== Post–US-Express Events ===
==== C2C Express Event ====
The C2C Express was an organized event that was created by Ben Wilson of New Zealand and Eric Propst of Michigan. The event was intended to be limited to pre 1980 automobiles that cost under $3000. This was intended to keep the cost affordable and in the spirit of the original runs of the 1970s. The event spanned from 2015 to 2019. The run Ran from the traditional Cannonball Route of Redball Garage in Manhattan to The Portofino Inn at Redondo beach California. The original event only had 3 competitors in which Wilson won in his Cadillac with a time of just under 40 hours. Over the next 3 years the event grew to the point that the final coast to coast run planned ballooned to over 40 entrants. The size of the event gave Wilson and Propst the idea to run their final coast to coast event from Darien, Connecticut to Portofino Inn located in Los Angeles. Darien to Portofino was the same route run as the 1979 Cannonball and became a 40-year anniversary tribute to the event. Over 40 teams registered for the event, 33 competed and 24 finished. Amongst the final event was a team of police officers in a 49 Pontiac, an ambulance driven by John Ficarra, a Lexus driven by record holder Ed Bolian, a vintage Monte Carlo piloted by current record holders Doug Tabbut & Arne Toman. Wilson and Propst both competed as well, Wilson drove a Ford Van and Propst a Crown Victoria. The winning time was 31:47.

==== Michael A. Preston Memorial Four Ball Rally 1982–1984 ====
The Four Ball Rally was an outlaw street race from Boston to San Diego. It was run from 1982 to 1984, and stands as the last of the true competitive cross-continent road races held in the twentieth century. The rally's official name was the Michael A. Preston Memorial Four Ball Rally (FBR) in commemoration of its founder, who died prior to the first event. The FBR was conceived to be the longest practical distance race between two major cities in the continental United States. The rally had multiple route options determined by the driving teams and generally exceed 3,100 miles. On average the race was 250 to 300 miles longer than the original Cannonball Baker Sea-to-Shining-Sea Memorial Trophy Dash rallies of the 1970s. Up to 50 entries, including international teams, were selected to participate. The event was "invitation only", and generally was restricted to professional drivers and others with documented driving experience. The race started at the Oster Chevrolet garage on Gardner Street in Boston Massachusetts and finished at the Sheraton Harbor Island Hotel in San Diego California.

1982 Four Ball Rally:

The inaugural Four Ball Rally kicked off in Boston on Friday, June 11, 1982, just as summer vacation traffic was getting underway. Twenty-seven cars would start the race. Twenty-one would finish. Michael Begley, a real estate developer from Manhattan Beach, California, and Steve Cook, a driving instructor at the Bondurant School of High Performance Driving at Sears Point Raceway in Novato, California, won the race in 37 hours and 18 minutes. Their route was 3,031 miles long. The team managed an average speed of 80.23 mph despite being in one of the slowest top-end cars in the rally—a 1983 Mercedes Benz 380SEL. The vehicle had a top speed of 116 mph. The Mercedes, a rental, was outfitted with a fuel cell, CB radio, police scanner, front and rear radar detectors and kill switches for the rear lights. Begley and Cook's goal was to stop as few times as possible to keep their average speed up. Between the main gas tank and the fuel cell their car had a 95-gallon capacity. A quick-fill cap on the fuel cell helped shave re-fueling time. In all they stopped just twice for gas and never broke down. The team got just one speeding ticket, in Arizona.

The team's driving experience: Michael Begley raced a 1964 Shelby Cobra and one of the five original 1963 Grand Sport Corvettes in the vintage racing circuit throughout the United States. Steve Cook competed in endurance races including Daytona and Sebring, as well as the Formula Ford series.

The second-place finishers were Mike DiGonis from Jamaica, New York, and Bernie Gans from Brooklyn, New York, in a 1975 De Tomaso Pantera with an elapsed time of 38 hours and 2 minutes, average speed of 80.57 mph while traveling 3,062 miles. In third-place was the team of Bob Weaver and Perry Meek both from Indiana in a 1981 Porsche 911 SC Turbo, made the 2,960-mile run in 38 hours and 52 minutes with an average speed of 76.15 mph.

Coverage of the race: a CBS News Charles Kuralt Evening News Report on June 13, 1982, and articles in the Manhattan Beach News on July 7, 1982, and the Beach Reporter on July 1, 1982.

1983 Four Ball Rally:

The 1983 Four Ball Rally got underway Friday, June 10. Fifty teams departed Boston, but only 38 crossed the San Diego finish line. Summer vacation traffic and the state police would challenge drivers for the second year in a row. Dirk Salz from West Germany and Farwell Perry From New York came in first with a record-breaking time of 36 hours and 10 minutes in a 1978 Porsche 911SC. Their average speed was 85.8 mph. They managed to get across the country with just one speeding ticket in Missouri.

The second-place team, Scott Thomas and Steve White both from Oklahoma, drove a 1984 Corvette. Their elapsed time was 36 hours and 53 minutes at an average speed of 81.6 mph.

Michael Begley and Bill Cooper came in third in a highly modified 1979 Mercedes 6.9 with 106-gallon fuel capacity. Begley was on the 1982 winning team. He and his new teammate brought plenty of driving experience. Cooper raced in the 24 Hours of Le Mans, the Daytona and Sebring endurance races as well as the Formula Atlantic and Formula Ford Series. Despite some significant setbacks the duo managed a finishing time of 37 hours and 4 minutes. Evading nearly two dozen Indiana State Police ate up considerable time. They finally managed to shake the troopers by hiding in a corn field, then continued taking secondary roads to elude the state police. Mechanical problems with the fuel system in New Mexico cost them plenty, too—2 hours and 18 minutes to be exact. Interestingly, an Arizona state trooper cut them a break. Clocked by instant-on radar, the trooper asked Begley "Do you know how fast you were going?" Begley says the officer seemed surprised when he answered, "about 170 mph". The trooper clarified saying, "It was actually 172 mph". For his honesty the officer cited Begley for 72 mph in a 55 mph zone.

Coverage of the rally: NBC News reporter Douglas Kiker's "Road Runners" segment aired June 12, 1983, on the Nightly News. The Cleveland Plain Dealer wrote an extensive magazine article on September 18, 1983. The Argonaut of Manhattan Beach, California featured a cover story on June 23, 1983. The Indianapolis News article entitled "Cops Put Brakes On Road Racers" ran June 11, 1983. The Indianapolis Star also covered the race on June 11, 1983, with an article entitled "Sports Cars Cross State In Coast-to-Coast Race."

1984 Four Ball Rally:

On Saturday June 3, 1984, the team of Edward M. Rahill, of Barrington Ill. and Timothy Montgomery, of Fremont, Ohio, driving a performance and range enhanced Pontiac Trans Am, won the race in a record time of 35:46, despite several hours of delays due to two arrests and mechanical issues during the race. This time still stands today as the fastest documented time for a race crossing the continental United States between Boston and San Diego. A significant point reference was that Rahill and Montgomery were believed to be out of the race after their two arrests and mechanical breakdown in Illinois. Race records indicated the team was able to reach an average speed between St. Louis and San Diego, including stops, exceeding 104 miles an hour.

An interesting development coming out of the race was the near celebrity status of Ohio State Trooper Sargent Roger Teague who apprehended four participants including Rahill and Montgomery, the eventual winners of the event. Sargent Teague was awarded the 1984 Super Trooper Award by the FBR races sponsors and attended the winner's banquet with his wife to receive his recognition.

The 1984 Four Ball Rally received coverage from National and International News sources like the AP, UPI, New York Times, Chicago Sun Times, Paul Harvey's June 5, 1984 broadcast and 73 other newspaper organizations on June 4 and 5. The level of police enforcement was so intense, of the twenty seven cars that had planned to leave Boston that day, only eleven were able to finish. The New York State Police alone arrested seven participants. The level of coordinated national police effort to stop the race was unprecedented in American history and led to its discontinuation as the increase in national publicity and added attention from law enforcement made running the event untenable.

== Bob Burns C2C2C memorial trophy dash ==
The Bob Burns or C2C2C is a new spin on the cannonball run. The event uses the original starting points of the Red Ball garage or Goodwives shopping center and uses the Portofino Inn as a halfway point. Drivers can use any route they like so long as these criteria are met. When Chris Clemens saw a sign being put up at the Pennsylvania border that said "sorry, we're closed" on RT80 the thought occurred to him to not only do another cannonball run, but to do it twice on a timed run. Chris decided to make a maiden trip for time to see what was realistic and named the event after his recently passed uncle. The car used was a 1999 Mercedes SL 500 previously owned by Bob Burns that Chris had been given by his Aunt Patty. The first run began on May 2, 2020, when Chris Clemens and Mark Spence set out experiencing many hardships on their run including traffic, street racers in Las Vegas and hours on George Washington bridge and set a time of 74 hours and 5 minutes. Road and track article At the time of writing, the event was attempted 23 times with two teams besting the initial time set by Chris Clemens and Mark Spence. One other completed the event but did not beat 74:05.

== Australian "Cannonball Runs" ==
Various versions of the cannonball run have been run in Australia. Like the original cannonball run, these were coast to coast races, though in this case, they started on the east coast of Australia and finished on the West coast, in Perth. They were mostly run in the 1980s, as one off or two off events. The Cannonball Sea to Shining Sea Paradise to Perth Trophy Dash was run on October 22, 1984, and went from Surfers Paradise in Queensland to Perth in Western Australia. Only three teams competed and the winning car completing the trip in 31 hours was a Pontiac, driven by a team of 3. The event ran a second and final time in 1986.

Another race, Australian Cannonball Cup, ran on November 2, 1984, from the outskirts of Melbourne to Fremantle in Western Australia. This event however, had some co-operation with the police. It was a legal race, and the contestants were supposed to be following the speed limit. 33 teams competed and there was some controversy after the race when the first-placed team were disqualified after it was discovered that they had been caught by police for speeding. The second-paced team, with a time of 33 hours and 4 minutes, were then awarded first prize.

In 1994 the first and only Cannonball Run in Australia ran from Darwin to Yularu and back again. Based on similar events in the United States, this event ended in tragedy when an out of control Ferrari F40 crashed into a checkpoint south of Alice Springs, resulting in the death of the two event officials manning the checkpoint as well as the two competitors. The remainder of the race had a 180 km/h (112 mph) speed limit imposed to prevent further accidents.

== See also ==
- Need for Speed: The Run
- Street racing - practice of illegally using public roadways for automobile races
