= Cannonball Run II =

1983 film by Hal Needham

- Theatrical release poster by Drew Struzan
- Directed by: Hal Needham
- Written by: Harvey Miller; Hal Needham; Albert S. Ruddy
- Produced by: Albert S. Ruddy
- Starring: Burt Reynolds; Dom DeLuise; Dean Martin; Sammy Davis Jr.; Jamie Farr; Marilu Henner; Telly Savalas; Shirley MacLaine; Susan Anton; Catherine Bach; Jackie Chan; Richard Kiel; Frank Sinatra
- Cinematography: Nick McLean
- Edited by: William D. Gordean; Carl Kress
- Music by: Al Capps
- Production company: Golden Harvest
- Distributed by: Warner Bros. (domestic); 20th Century Fox (international); Fortune Star Media
- Release dates: December 17, 1983 (Japan); June 29, 1984 (United States)
- Running time: 108 minutes
- Countries: United States; Hong Kong
- Languages: English; Cantonese
- Budget: $18-22 million
- Box office: $56.3 million (worldwide)

Cannonball Run II is a 1983 American road action comedy film starring Burt Reynolds and an all-star cast, released by Warner Bros. Pictures and Golden Harvest. The film is the second installment of the Cannonball Run trilogy and a sequel to The Cannonball Run (1981). Like the first film, it is set around an illegal cross-country race, inspired by the real life Cannonball Baker Sea-to-Shining-Sea Memorial Trophy Dash. This marked the final feature film appearances of Dean Martin and Frank Sinatra. Their appearances, coupled with those of Sammy Davis Jr. marked the final on-screen appearance of the Rat Pack team. The film also marked the final film appearance of Jim Nabors before his death in November 2017. The film was followed by a sequel, Speed Zone, in 1989.

== Plot ==
Having lost the first Cannonball Run race, Sheik Abdul Ben Falafel is ordered by his father, King Abdul, to go back to America and win another Cannonball Run in order to "emblazon the Falafel name as the fastest in the world". When Sheik Abdul points out that there is no Cannonball Run that year, his father simply tells him to "buy one".

To make sure his "Royal Ulcer" does not prevent him from winning, the Sheik hires Doctor Nikolas Van Helsing, who teamed with J.J. McClure and Victor Prinzim in the first race, as his in-car physician. Most of the participants from the first race are lured back, including J.J. and Victor, who have taken jobs working with a flying stunt crew.

Meanwhile, Jamie Blake and Morris Fenderbaum are in financial trouble with Don Don Canneloni, who in turn is in similar financial trouble with mob enforcer Hymie Kaplan. After the Sheik manages to bail out Blake and Fenderbaum by handing one of Don Don's thugs a stack of cash, Don Don hatches a plot to kidnap the Sheik in an attempt to extort money from him.

The race begins with J.J. and Victor dressed as a US Army general and his driver, a private. They catch the attention of Betty and Veronica, who are dressed as nuns for a musical, but remain in character and hitch a ride with J.J. and Victor when they think the guys could become overnight millionaires. They do not lose their habits until later.

Other racers include Mitsubishi engineer Jackie Chan, teamed with Arnold, a giant, behind the wheel in a car—a Mitsubishi Starion—able to go under water. In a red Lamborghini (white at first) with "two great-looking chicks in it" (as the cops chasing them continually say) is the duo of Jill Rivers and Marcie Thatcher. Another team in a Cadillac Fleetwood is accompanied by an orangutan who has a penchant for destructive behavior, giving elderly ladies the middle finger and kissing people. The orangutan sits at the front of the car holding a mock steering wheel and dressed as a chauffeur. They are pulled over at one point by two California Highway Patrol officers who assume they are with the Candid Camera show, but when the officers try putting on a performance, the orangutan beats them up instead.

J.J. and Victor stop along the way to help a stranded soldier, Homer Lyle. They also get much better acquainted with their passengers, Betty and Veronica, who change into something a little more comfortable. Don Don's enforcers continue to blunder along the way, with disastrous results.

After Don Don's gang capture the Sheik, the racers band together to invade Don Don's "Pinto Ranch". J.J., Victor, and Fenderbaum infiltrate it in drag, dressed as belly dancers. Others barrel in by car and rescue the Sheik, who is reluctant to leave, since he has his pick of women there. The three "dancers" and Blake go to their leader, Frank Sinatra, to seek help, only to have him jump into the race himself.

In the end, the Sheik bankrolls Don Don's Ranch and then declares that he is upping the stakes to $2 million for the winner. All jump into their automobiles and make a dash for the finish line, avoiding traffic patrollers on the way.

The Sheik, as it turns out, loses yet again, this time blaming Dr. Van Helsing who rode with him for injecting him with an unknown substance. He convinces his father that he will win the return-trip race, having hired the winner of this one. It turns out to be the orangutan, who kisses the startled King on the lips.

== Cast ==
- Burt Reynolds as J.J. McClure
- Dom DeLuise as Victor Prinzim / Captain Chaos
  (DeLuise also appears uncredited as Don Canneloni)
- Dean Martin as Jamie Blake
- Sammy Davis Jr. as Morris Fenderbaum
- Jamie Farr as Sheik Abdul Ben Falafel
- Ricardo Montalbán as King Abdul Ben Falafel
- Telly Savalas as "Hymie" Kaplan
- Marilu Henner as Betty
- Shirley MacLaine as Veronica
- Susan Anton as Jill Rivers ("Lamborghini Babe #1", originally played by Tara Buckman)
- Catherine Bach as Marcie Thatcher ("Lamborghini Babe #2", originally played by Adrienne Barbeau)
- Foster Brooks, Sid Caesar and Louis Nye as the fishermen in the rowboat
- Jackie Chan as Himself, Mitsubishi engineer
- Richard Kiel as Arnold, Jackie's driver
- Tim Conway and Don Knotts as California Highway Patrol officers who pull over the driving orangutan
- Mel Tillis as Mel and Tony Danza as Tony, the limo drivers with the orangutan
- Manis as The Orangutan 'Limo driver'
- Jack Elam as Dr. Nikolas Van Helsing
- Charles Nelson Reilly as Don Don Canneloni
- Michael V. Gazzo as Sonny, Don Don's Henchman
- Alex Rocco as Tony, Don Don's Henchman
- Henry Silva as "Slim", Don Don's Henchman
- Abe Vigoda as Caesar, Don Don's Henchman
- Jim Nabors as Private Homer Lyle, a parody of his popular character, Gomer Pyle
- Molly Picon as Mrs. Goldfarb, Seymour's mother from the previous film though Roger Moore does not appear as Seymour. In this film, Cannonballers drive into her house
- Frank Sinatra as Himself
- Joe Theismann as Mack, the truck driver who helps out Jill and Marcie
- Shawn Weatherly as The Girl In Jamie Blake's Bed
- Linda Lei as The Beautiful Girl, Japanese-American girl that Jackie talks to after biker fight
- Kai Joseph Wong as Japanese Businessman
- Dale Ishimoto as Japanese Father, during biker fight scene
- Arte Johnson as an "Ace" Pilot Victor who says is "from World War 2" and speaks with a telltale German accent
- Fred Dryer as a California Highway Patrol Sergeant (listed in the opening credits as "Fred Dreyer")
- Chris Lemmon as a Young California Highway Patrol officer
- George Lindsey as Uncle Cal
- Doug McClure as The Sheik's Servant, an out-of-work actor who has not had a series in nine years
- Jilly Rizzo as Jilly
- Dub Taylor as Sheriff
- Harry Gant as a Mob Henchman
- Director Hal Needham appears uncredited as a Porsche 928 driver in a cowboy hat, whose car is crushed flat in the movie by the monster truck, Bigfoot (driven by owner/creator Bob Chandler)
- Producer Albert Ruddy appears in the satirical Mafioso subplot with Rocco and Vigoda, both of which had also appeared in The Godfather which Ruddy produced

== Production ==
Jaclyn Smith was originally meant to be the female lead, but dropped out. Hal Needham said that Smith was worried about his improvisational style: "I think she was scared to death to be up there against Burt and Dom. I don't want someone on the set that's gonna be that scared. So we went somewhere else". Her role was replaced by the Betty and Veronica duo, played by Marilu Henner and Shirley MacLaine respectively.

Frank Sinatra agreed to do a cameo at the suggestion of Sammy Davis Jr. and Dean Martin. Needham wrote three versions of the script for him, ones where he would either work a week, two days, or a day. He picked the latter. He was paid $30,000 which he donated to charity. It was the first film he had made in three years and the first time he had reunited with Rat Pack members professionally or personally in three years. Needham says he turned up half an hour early and did his scene with minimal fuss.

Part of the film was shot near Tucson, Arizona. To show the momentum of the race, the producers commissioned Ralph Bakshi to animate a cartoon sequence for the finale.

== Reception ==
=== Box office ===
The film opened in Japan on December 17, 1983, and grossed $846,676 from 22 theatres in five cities in its first two days. It went on to be the second-highest-grossing foreign film of 1984 (along with Jackie Chan's Project A at number three), grossing ¥2.96 billion.

In the United States and Canada, after the tenth-highest 1984 opening weekend of US$8.3 million, Cannonball Run II slowed down, becoming the 32nd-most popular 1984 film at the American and Canada box office with a total lifetime gross of US$28 million, less than half that of the first Cannonball Run. According to one review of the film, Cannonball Run II still turned a healthy profit, and the reviewer attributed the film's financial success to preselling.

The film enjoyed more success overseas. In West Germany (where it was the year's seventh highest-grossing film) and France, the film drew 3,748,167 box-office admissions. The film had a total worldwide gross of US$56.3 million.

=== Critical reception ===
Cannonball Run II met with even harsher reviews than had its predecessor, with a 12% approval rating on Rotten Tomatoes based on reviews from 17 critics. Roger Ebert awarded the film one half star out of four, calling it "one of the laziest insults to the intelligence of moviegoers that I can remember. Sheer arrogance made this picture". Ebert's At the Movies cohost Gene Siskel was even harsher, awarding it zero stars out of four, referring to it as "worthless" and referring to it as "a total ripoff, a deceptive film that gives movies a bad name" in his At the Movies review. Siskel named it his least-favorite film that he had seen during his time doing At the Movies with Ebert- sometimes citing it as the worst movie ever made. He went further in his print review, writing:

How could any car race movie be worse than Stroker Ace? Easy, and how's this for chutzpah? The cross-country road race in Cannonball Run II takes place mostly off camera in a pedestrian animation sequence by Ralph Bakshi. We see a bunch of little cars with lines and arrows slide across a national map to the beat of some unforgettable music. And that's the race.

How cheap can you get? How little regard for the audience can you have? All of the road racing appears to have been done in Southern California so as not to interfere with the tennis and golf games of its celebrity-filled cast. A cameo appearance by Frank Sinatra appears to have been filmed in isolation and then inserted so as to appear that Reynolds is in the same scene with him.

Cannonball Run II doesn't even try to be a movie. It's snapshots of a bunch of familiar, tired old faces improvising tired old gags.

Both critics expressed bewilderment by Burt Reynolds' career choices, declaring that he was wasting his considerable talent and noting that Reynolds' huge fan base did not like the film (nor the recent Stroker Ace) and would stop going to see his movies if he continued to make such terrible films. Rob Salem of The Toronto Star expressed similar sentiments in his review.

Kevin Thomas of the Los Angeles Times wrote that "if you bother to submit yourself to Cannonball Run II and happen to go the distance, be sure to stay for the end credits, the funniest part of the picture by far. As they unroll on the left of the screen, we're treated to a series of bloopers showing the stars breaking each other up during shooting, blowing one take after another. Ah. if only this antic humor had been allowed to burst through earlier. From the start it was clear enough that the cast was having a ball, but for the most part the material is so puerile that the film is that familiar instance of the actors having more fun than we are." Janet Maslin of The New York Times called the film "an endless string of cameo performances from a cast whose funny participants are badly outnumbered and whose television roots are unmistakable." Kathleen Carroll of the New York Daily News gave the film only a single star out of a possible four, writing:

Cannonball Run II, which once again features Burt Reynolds as that completely forgettable character—car-crazy J.J. McClure—is such a disgraceful mess that it looks more like a rolling cocktail party than an actual movie.

The cast is full of familiar faces, some of which, sad to say, appear to be in dire need of the services of a Beverly Hills plastic surgeon. Burt even managed to persuade the rich-and famous members of the Hollywood Rat Pack to show up for this worthless comedy which, like Cannonball Run, attempts to keep pace with cheating competitors in a cross-country automobile race.

Dean Martin gets to spout off such tired jokes as "My liver died last year." Sammy Davis Jr., Martin's favorite sidekick, is allowed to wear his most expensive jewelry even in those tasteless scenes in which he's masquerading as a priest. Shirley MacLaine, who, along with Marilu Henner, plays a footloose member of a backroad touring company of The Sound of Music, poses as a demure nun before stripping off her habit and exposing her shapely gams. Even "the King," Frank Sinatra, puts in a brief appearance, playing his favorite role—himself.

As it is, the entire cast seems to be sniggering over some private dirty joke which they refuse to reveal to the audience. Let's just hope this is one Hollywood joke that backfires at the box office.

Rick Lyman of The Philadelphia Inquirer wrote that "if Cannonball Run II is more amusing than Stroker Ace—and it is—it's only because you can appreciate its vulgarity in a state of open-mouthed, morbid fascination."

The film received negative reviews in Tucson, where it was largely filmed. Robert S. Cauthorn of The Arizona Daily Star said it "accomplishes the difficult feat of being more obnoxious and mindless than the first; It's as much fun as going to your mechanic for a tuneup and being told that you need an engine overhaul." John Lankford of the Tucson Citizen praised the location shooting, but remarked that "whatever tiny spark of life that made the first Cannonball work at all is missing in action here. The story is lame, there is no direction, the editing is sloppy . . . I could go on and on with this as you can well imagine. But this horse is already down and out; my puny efforts to finish it off would seem cruel."

The film received eight Golden Raspberry Award nominations at the 5th Golden Raspberry Awards in 1984, including Worst Picture, Worst Director (Needham), Worst Actor (Reynolds for both this film and City Heat), Worst Actress (MacLaine), Worst Supporting Actor (Davis Jr.), Worst Supporting Actress (both Susan Anton and Henner) and Worst Screenplay (Needham, Albert S. Ruddy and Harvey Miller).

== See also ==
- Speed Zone, also known as Cannonball Fever and Cannonball Run III
- Cannonball Baker Sea-to-Shining-Sea Memorial Trophy Dash
