= The Cannonball Run =

1981 film by Hal Needham

- Theatrical release poster by Drew Struzan
- Directed by: Hal Needham
- Written by: Brock Yates
- Produced by: Albert S. Ruddy
- Starring: Burt Reynolds; Roger Moore; Farrah Fawcett; Dom DeLuise; Dean Martin; Sammy Davis Jr.; Adrienne Barbeau; Jamie Farr; Terry Bradshaw; Mel Tillis; Jackie Chan; Michael Hui
- Cinematography: Michael Butler
- Edited by: Donn Cambern; William D. Gordean
- Music by: Al Capps
- Production companies: Golden Harvest; Albert S. Ruddy Productions
- Distributed by: 20th Century-Fox (United States) (Note: The rights to the film are currently owned by Fortune Star Media.); Panasia Films (Hong Kong)
- Release date: June 19, 1981
- Running time: 95 minutes
- Countries: United States; Hong Kong
- Languages: English; Cantonese
- Budget: $16–18 million
- Box office: $160 million

The Cannonball Run is a 1981 action comedy film directed by Hal Needham, produced by Hong Kong firm Golden Harvest, and distributed by 20th Century-Fox. Filmed in Panavision, it features an all-star ensemble cast, including Burt Reynolds, Dom DeLuise, Roger Moore, Farrah Fawcett, Jackie Chan, Sammy Davis Jr. and Dean Martin. The film is based on the 1979 running of the Cannonball Baker Sea-to-Shining-Sea Memorial Trophy Dash, an actual cross-country outlaw road race beginning in Darien, Connecticut and ending in California.

It was the sixth-highest-grossing domestic film of 1981 and became the first installment of the Cannonball Run trilogy. It was followed by Cannonball Run II (1983) (which was far less successful at the box office and with critics) and Speed Zone (1989). This film and its sequel are the final film appearances of actor Dean Martin. It also features Jackie Chan in his second Hollywood role. Cannonball (1976) and The Gumball Rally (1976) are two other motion pictures based on the actual Cannonball Run outlaw road race.

== Plot ==
A diverse group of racers gathers in Connecticut to participate in the Cannonball Run, an illegal, cross-country road race from the East Coast to California. The goal is simple: reach the West Coast in the shortest elapsed time. Participants depart individually from the starting line by punching a time card that records their departure time, which will be used to calculate their total time upon arrival.

The competitors employ a wide array of vehicles, disguises, and tactics to evade law enforcement and beat their rivals. Among them are J.J. McClure, a former professional race car driver, and his best friend and mechanic, Victor Prinzim. The two disguise a Dodge Tradesman ambulance as a legitimate emergency vehicle, hoping the ruse will allow them to bypass traffic laws. Accompanying them is Dr. Nikolas Van Helsing, a doctor with dubious credentials and a large hypodermic needle, included to sell the illusion of a real medical emergency.

Meanwhile, environmental crusader Pamela Glover is accompanying Arthur J. Foyt, a by-the-book government official and head of the fictional "Safety Enforcement Unit," who is determined to stop the race due to its potential danger and environmental impact. After a minor roadside incident, Glover is kidnapped by J.J. and Victor under the pretense of transporting her for medical treatment. Though initially resistant, she gradually becomes sympathetic to the racers and their eccentricities.

Other racers include Jamie Blake and Morris Fenderbaum, two washed-up former Formula One drivers who masquerade as Catholic priests while driving a red Ferrari 308 GTS. Jill Rivers and Marcie Thatcher, two attractive and cunning women, enter the race in a black Lamborghini Countach, relying on their sex appeal to manipulate male police officers. A Japanese team drives a high-tech Subaru outfitted with computers, sensors, and even a rocket booster. Wealthy sheikh Abdul Ben Falafel races in a white Rolls-Royce, and Seymour Goldfarb Jr.—a wealthy man who insists he is actor Roger Moore—drives a silver Aston Martin DB5, outfitted with James Bond-style gadgets.

Throughout the race, the teams use various strategies to avoid detection, trick law enforcement, and sabotage their competitors. The ambulance team pretends to be transporting a U.S. Senator's wife in critical condition, drugging Glover during police stops to maintain the ruse. Jill and Marcie repeatedly unzip their jumpsuits to distract male officers. The Subaru team races at night with headlights off, using infrared technology to navigate. Seymour employs gadgets like oil slicks and smoke screens to evade pursuit. Another team, Bradford Compton and Shakey Finch who are disguised as newlyweds on a motorcycle, are forced to ride in a constant wheelie due to the heavier partner Shakey's size.

A recurring rivalry emerges between the ambulance and the Ferrari. In Ohio, Fenderbaum and Blake convince Victor—temporarily out of his "Captain Chaos" persona—to stop so they can bless the "patient" in the back of the ambulance. During the distraction, they sabotage the ambulance by deflating a tire. J.J. gets revenge in Missouri by alerting a police officer that the two men dressed as priests may be indecent exposure suspects.

As the race nears its conclusion, several teams are stopped by construction work in the desert. A violent encounter with a biker gang breaks out. Victor transforms into Captain Chaos and leads the charge against the bikers, with help from the martial arts-trained Subaru team. Once the road is cleared, all the racers dash back to their vehicles, leading to a tight final stretch.

The racers arrive at the finish line simultaneously, prompting a footrace to the time clock. J.J. gives Victor the team's time card and clears a path by ambushing other racers. Victor nears victory, but a bystander yells that her baby has fallen into the water. Captain Chaos instinctively diverts to save the baby, which turns out be a dog. Marcie reaches the clock first and wins the race.

J.J. is frustrated with Victor for sacrificing the win and says he's sick of Captain Chaos, angrily ripping off Victor's costume. Victor cheerfully responds that he no longer wants to be Captain Chaos anyway and puts on a new costume—he now wants to be "Captain USA." The two reconcile and embrace.

== Cast ==
Cannonball Run featured an all-star ensemble cast, including these actors:

- Burt Reynolds and Dom DeLuise as racer J.J. McClure and his buddy, Victor Prinzim, who occasionally becomes his alter ego "Captain Chaos", to the annoyance of J.J.
- Roger Moore as Seymour Goldfarb Jr., in a self-parody of his role as James Bond. The car that he drives is an Aston Martin DB5, displaying the UK registration plate 6633 PP (matching the plates on a DB5 from two Bond films; despite this, Moore's Bond never actually drove an Aston Martin in any of his seven Bond films—the Lotus Esprit being the car most associated with his tenure in the role). Molly Picon portrays his mother Mrs. Goldfarb. Five women ride with Seymour, including model Lois Hamilton, billed as Lois Areno, with Simone Burton, Finele Carpenter, Susan McDonald and Janet Woytak. Moore's next Bond film For Your Eyes Only premiered on June 24, 1981, only a few days after The Cannonball Run.
- Farrah Fawcett as tree-loving photographer Pamela Glover. J.J. calls her "Beauty".
- Dean Martin, as race car driver Jamie Blake, and Sammy Davis Jr. as scam artist and degenerate gambler Morris Fenderbaum, both disguised as Catholic priests. Jimmy "The Greek" Snyder plays himself as Fenderbaum bets on his success (Snyder was Martin's neighbor when both were growing up in Steubenville, Ohio). Blake's car, a 1979 Ferrari 308 GTS, is the same as the model in the TV series Magnum, P.I..
- George Furth as Arthur J. Foyt, the insipid, uptight main antagonist of the film, who tries to have the race stopped.
- Jackie Chan and Michael Hui as drivers of a Subaru GL filled with gadgets. In the opening part of the film, Chan and Hui are introduced on a talk show (hosted by Johnny Yune) as the operators of Japan's entry into the race. Both Chan and Hui are actually Hongkongers (Chinese). Jackie Chan's character is referred to as "Jackie Chan".
- Jamie Farr as Sheik Abdul Ben Falafel, a wealthy Arabian potentate determined to win the race, even if he has to buy it. Bianca Jagger makes a brief appearance as his sister. Farr's car is a souped-up Rolls-Royce Silver Shadow. The Sheik is the only character to appear in all three Cannonball Run films.
- Mel Tillis and Terry Bradshaw are Mel and Terry, a couple of "good ol' boys" driving a 1976 Chevrolet Chevelle Laguna NASCAR Hawaiian Tropic replica. At the start of the race, they have a Monte Carlo.
- Adrienne Barbeau and Tara Buckman as Marcie Thatcher and Jill Rivers, satin-Spandex-clad "hotties" in a black Lamborghini Countach who distract police officers with cleavage. The same Lamborghini was used in the film's opening credits as it was being pursued by a Nevada Highway Patrol car after spray-painting a 55 mph speed limit sign. Their character names are not mentioned during the story but appear in the end credits. Their names return in the sequel, although the parts were re-cast.
- Valerie Perrine has a cameo as the state trooper pulling over the Lamborghini duo, beating them at their own game.
- Peter Fonda has a cameo referencing his motorcycle gang leader character in The Wild Angels while wearing his stars-and-stripes leather jacket from Easy Rider. The appearance of Fonda and his motorcycle gang during a halt in the race offer an excuse for Chan and others ("I'm Roger Moore") to demonstrate their fighting skills. Fonda's big, bald buddy ("Roger Who?") is played by biker movie veteran Robert Tessier.
- Bert Convy as wealthy but bored executive Bradford Compton, who planned to run the Cannonball by motorcycle with the help of an old friend, Shakey Finch (Warren Berlinger), once the world's greatest cross-country motorcyclist. The two planned to disguise themselves as newlyweds. Compton's now-portly ally forces the motorcycle into a wheelie for the entire race.
- Jack Elam as Dr. Nikolas Van Helsing (the same name as the famous vampire hunter). This Van Helsing is a proctologist and graduate of the University of Rangoon, and the Knoxville, Tennessee College of Faith Healing.
- Rick Aviles and Alfie Wise as "Mad Dog" and "Batman", tow-truck drivers who jump the train flatcar.
- John Fiedler as the desk clerk.
- Joe Klecko as the Polish driver in the van who gets pulled over by Mr. Foyt (Klecko was not only an active player in the National Football League, like Bradshaw, but also a trucker in the off-season).
- Car and Driver magazine columnist and correspondent Brock Yates, who, having created the real-life Cannonball Run, wrote the film directly for the screen, plays the race organizer who announces the rules at the starting line.
- Director Hal Needham appears uncredited as the ambulance EMT.
- Veteran Daytona 500 commentator Ken Squier and NFL on CBS producer Robert D. Stenner, who produced the CBS Daytona 500 broadcasts from 1979 to 1993 (except in 1992), appear as California Highway Patrolmen.
- Veteran voice actor June Foray provides the dubbed dialogue of several of the women who escort Goldfarb in the race ("Seymour's girls", as the opening credits list them) in an uncredited performance.

== Production ==
The film continued director Hal Needham's tradition of showing a gag reel of bloopers during the closing credits (a practice he started with Smokey and the Bandit II). Jackie Chan says that this inspired him to do the same at the end of most of his films.

=== Original race ===
The film is based on the 1979 running of the Cannonball Baker Sea-to-Shining-Sea Memorial Trophy Dash, an actual cross-country outlaw road race held four times in the 1970s, starting at the Red Ball Garage on 31st Street in New York City (later the Lock, Stock and Barrel Restaurant in Darien, Connecticut) and ending at the Portofino Inn in Redondo Beach, California, in Los Angeles.

The screenwriter was automotive journalist Brock Yates, who had conceived the real-life Cannonball Baker event. Yates had originally proposed the race as a writer for Car and Driver. The race had only one rule: "All competitors will drive any vehicle of their choosing, over any route, at any speed they judge practical, between the starting point and destination. The competitor finishing with the lowest elapsed time is the winner".

Yates' team was the only participant in the original 1971 running, which was named after the driver Ernest "Cannonball" Baker, who drove across country in 1927 and made it in 60 hours. Yates wrote a book about it called The Sunday Driver. In 1973 it was reported John G. Avildsen and writer Eugene Price were to make a film based on the book called The Cannonball-Baker-Sea-to-Shining-Sea Memorial Trophy Dash. The film was not made but the race did inspire the (unrelated) 1976 films Cannonball and The Gumball Rally.

==== 1979 race ====
In the March 1979 race, Yates formed one of 46 teams with director Hal Needham to compete with a 150-MPH van converted into an ambulance, with LA doctor Lyell Royer, and Brock's second wife, Pamela Reynolds, riding as the patient on the gurney. Although the ambulance never made it to the finish line — the transmission gave out 50 miles short of the Redondo Beach finish line — Yates made it to the movie as a race official and Needham as an EMT, as did the ambulance itself and even the transmission failure. The ambulance was stopped once, in Pennsylvania; that event made it into the movie, as did a cop stopping traffic in Kansas, exiting from a rodeo, to let the ambulance pass unimpeded.

The Right Bra team was put together by auto writer Judy Stropus, race driver Donna Mae Mims and Peggy Niemcek, whose husband was part of another entry, driving a Cadillac limousine. In the movie, it became a buxom two-woman team Marcie Thatcher and Jill Rivers played by Adrienne Barbeau and Tara Buckman driving a Lamborghini, but as auto writer Stropus said decades later, "a little editorial license never hurt anyone". Yates points out in his book Cannonball! that Stropus's version of the race does not mention the baptism with green fluid from the portable toilet the three girls experienced when the limousine overturned.

=== Script ===
The characters J.J. McClure (Burt Reynolds) and Victor Prinzim (Dom DeLuise) participate in the Cannonball Run in an ambulance: a heavily modified Dodge van. In the beginning, J.J. says to himself "we could get a black Trans Am", then answers his own question with "Nah that's been done", a reference to the Smokey and the Bandit films of Reynolds and director Needham.

In an attempt to appear legitimate to law enforcement, the team of J.J. and Victor hires Doctor Nikolas Van Helsing, a frightening, yet friendly, physician of questionable skill played by Jack Elam. They kidnap attractive young photographer Pamela Glover (Farrah Fawcett) — whom they nickname "Beauty" — to be their cover patient. Beauty vehemently opposes her kidnapping first, but eventually comes to sympathize with her captors and falls for J.J.

=== Development ===
Yates and Needham worked on a script and Al Ruddy became attached as producer. They wanted Reynolds to star, but he was reluctant to make more car-themed films. He was eventually persuaded by Needham's promise to keep the actor's schedule to only 14 days of filming, and a fee of $5 million plus a percentage of the profits. Finance came from Raymond Chow of Golden Harvest, who requested that Jackie Chan be included in the cast.

Reynolds later said of Cannonball Run: "I did that film for all the wrong reasons. I never liked it. I did it to help out a friend of mine, Hal Needham. And I also felt it was immoral to turn down that kind of money. I suppose I sold out so I couldn't really object to what people wrote about me."

== Reception ==
=== Box office ===
A huge commercial success, The Cannonball Run opened June 19, 1981 on 1,673 screens and grossed $11,765,574 in its opening weekend, the fourth highest opening of all time, but this was not enough to beat Superman II that opened the same weekend with a record-breaking $14,100,523. The film went on to gross $72,179,579 in the United States and Canada, making it the sixth highest-grossing film of 1981, behind Raiders of the Lost Ark, On Golden Pond, Superman II, Arthur, and Stripes.

It was also successful overseas. In France, The Cannonball Run sold 988,509 box office admissions in 1981. In Germany, the film sold 4,825,937 admissions, becoming the third highest-grossing film of 1981. In Japan, it was the second highest-grossing foreign film of 1982, grossing ¥2.1 billion at the box office. The film grossed over US$100 million worldwide in its initial run, and went on to gross a worldwide total of $160 million.

=== Critical response ===
On the review aggregator website Rotten Tomatoes, 29% of 34 critics' reviews are positive, with an average rating of 4.6/10. The website's consensus reads: "Cannonball Run casts a bevy of famous faces as its wacky racers but forgets to give them characters to play, resulting in 90 dull minutes that feel like a marathon." Metacritic, which uses a weighted average, assigned the film a score of 28 out of 100, based on 10 critics, indicating "generally unfavorable" reviews.

Roger Ebert gave the film a half-star out of four, calling it "an abdication of artistic responsibility at the lowest possible level of ambition. In other words, they didn't even care enough to make a good lousy movie". Variety described the film as "full of terribly inside showbiz jokes and populated by what could be called Burt and Hal's Rat Pack, film takes place in that redneck never-never land where most of the guys are beer-guzzling good ole boys and all the gals are fabulously built tootsies". Vincent Canby of The New York Times called the film "inoffensive and sometimes funny. Because there are only a limited number of variations that can be worked out on this same old highway race, don't bother to see it unless you're already hooked on the genre".

=== Accolades ===
The film was nominated for a Golden Raspberry Award for Worst Supporting Actress for Fawcett, but lost to Diana Scarwid for the cult film Mommie Dearest at the 2nd Golden Raspberry Awards.

== Accident ==
On June 25, 1980, 24-year-old German American stuntwoman Heidi von Beltz, a former championship skier, stuntwoman, and aspiring actress, was critically injured in a car crash during production of the film. The original stunt person had left the production to attend an emergency family illness, and the stunt coordinator Bobby Bass called his then-fiancée von Beltz to the set for a stunt that he said was to be "a piece of cake." The car was to be driven by stuntman Jimmy Nickerson, and required him to weave between oncoming vehicles. Meanwhile, von Beltz was asked to ride in the passenger seat, operating a smoke machine, giving the impression the car was on fire.

The car, an Aston Martin, had been beset with mechanical problems, including defective steering, clutch, and speedometer. It also had bald tires and no seat belts. Nickerson asked for repairs to the car, and while some were done, other things were left unfixed, including the lack of seatbelts. During the planned stunt the car collided head-on with a van, breaking von Beltz' neck and leaving her quadriplegic.

When it became clear that von Beltz' personal injury lawsuit would exceed all available primary insurance coverage, the production's excess insurer, Interstate Fire (a subsidiary of Fireman's Fund Insurance Company) sued von Beltz and her employer, Stuntman Inc., for a declaratory judgment that von Beltz's lawsuit was not covered under its policy. In 1988, the U.S. Court of Appeals for the Ninth Circuit ruled that there was a duty to defend, and that there was also a duty to indemnify to the extent that von Beltz was seeking recovery for mental injuries (the exclusion for bodily injuries was ruled to be enforceable).

She was eventually awarded $7 million although a judge reduced the amount and she ended up with $3.2 million. Much of the settlement went to her attorneys and to paying off medical bills. Her lawsuit against the movie's producers led to required seat-belt use in all stunt cars and caused the Directors Guild of America to prohibit directors from altering stunts on location. She died in October 2015 at age 59.

== Legacy ==
The film was followed by two sequels, Cannonball Run II (1983) and Speed Zone (1989). The Cannonball Run and Cannonball Run II were Dean Martin's last films.

Sega AM2 game designer Yu Suzuki cited The Cannonball Run as an influence on his hit 1986 arcade racing game Out Run.

=== Remake ===
Warner Bros. has acquired the rights to the Cannonball Run franchise and in 2016 set Etan Cohen to write and direct a remake as Cannonball. Andre Morgan and Alan Gasmer were hired as producers.

Doug Liman was in early talks to direct the film from a script by Thomas Lennon and Robert Ben Garant in June 2018.

== See also ==
- Cannonball (film) - comedy drama also based on the Cannonball Run
- Cannonball Run II
- Speed Zone, also known as Cannonball Run III
- Steel Ball Run - manga inspired by The Cannonball Run
- Need for Speed: The Run
