= Snetterton Circuit =

Motor racing circuit in the United Kingdom

- Snetterton 300 Circuit (2011–present)
- Location: Snetterton, Norfolk, England
- Coordinates: 52°27′59″N 0°56′54″E
- FIA Grade: 3
- Owner: MotorSport Vision (2004–present)
- Opened: 27 October 1951; 75 years ago
- Major events: Current: BTCC (1979, 1984–present); British GT (1993–1996, 1998–2004, 2006–present); BSB (1996–present); TCR UK (2022–present); Former: GB3 (2013–2023); British F3 (1977–2004, 2006–2012); EuroBOSS Series (1997, 2007); F5000 (1969–1975); Formula Ford Festival (1972–1975); ETCC (1965–1968); European F2 (1967); Lombank Trophy (1960–1963)
- Website: https://www.snetterton.co.uk/

Snetterton 300 Circuit (2011–present)
- Length: 2.970 mi (4.779 km)
- Turns: 12
- Race lap record: 1:39.933 ( (Brazil) Felipe Nasr, Dallara F308, 2011, F3)

Snetterton 200 Circuit (2011–present)
- Length: 2.000 mi (3.219 km)
- Turns: 8
- Race lap record: 1:06.572 ( (United Kingdom) Chris Dittmann, Dallara F312, 2017, F3)

Snetterton 100 Circuit (2011–present)
- Length: 0.980 mi (1.577 km)
- Turns: 5
- Race lap record: 1:16.210 (Note: Sprint competition, held over 1.75 laps.) ( (United Kingdom) Colin Calder, Gould GR37, 2011, British Sprint Championship)

Snetterton Circuit (1997–2010)
- Length: 1.952 mi (3.141 km)
- Turns: 8
- Race lap record: 0:56.095 ( (Netherlands) Klaas Zwart, Benetton B197, 2007, F1)

Snetterton Circuit (1990–1996)
- Length: 1.949 mi (3.137 km)
- Turns: 8
- Race lap record: 0:59.470 ( (Brazil) Luiz Garcia Jr., Reynard 95D, 1996, F3000)

Snetterton Circuit (1974–1989)
- Length: 1.917 mi (3.085 km)
- Turns: 8
- Race lap record: 0:55.370 ( (United Kingdom) Andrew Gilbert-Scott, Reynard 88D, 1989, F3000)

Snetterton Circuit (1965–1973)
- Length: 2.710 mi (4.361 km)
- Turns: 9
- Race lap record: 1:18.400 ( (United States) Brett Lunger, Trojan T101, 1973, F5000)

Snetterton Circuit (1951–1964)
- Length: 2.710 mi (4.361 km)
- Turns: 8
- Race lap record: 1:32.600 ( (United Kingdom) Jim Clark, Lotus 18, 1960, F1)

Snetterton Circuit is a motor racing course in Norfolk, England, originally opened in 1953. Owned by Jonathan Palmer's MotorSport Vision organisation since 2004, it is situated on the A11 road 12 mi (19 km) north-east of the town of Thetford and 19 mi (31 km) south-west of the city of Norwich. The circuit is named after the nearby village of Snetterton to the north-west of the circuit, although much of the circuit lies in the adjoining civil parish of Quidenham.

The circuit hosts races from series including the British Touring Car Championship, British Formula Three Championship and British Superbike Championship. From 1980 to 1994, the track hosted the UK's first 24-hour race, the Willhire 24 Hour. From 2003 to 2013 the Citroën 2CV 24 Hour Race was held at Snetterton on the 200 Circuit. After a short stint racing at Anglesey the 2CV 24Hr race has again returned to Snetterton and is usually held around the August bank holiday weekend.

== Pre-racing history ==
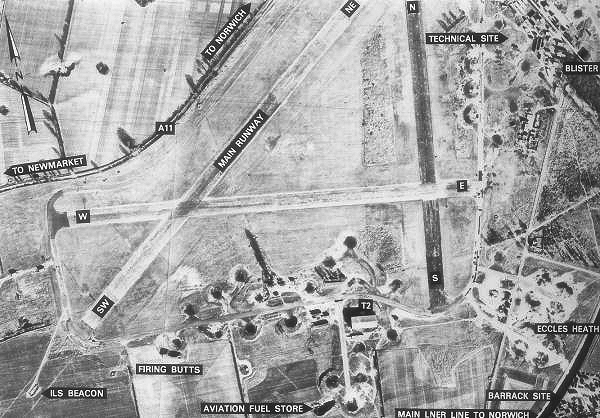
Photograph of WW2 airfield

Snetterton was originally an RAF airfield, RAF Snetterton Heath, later used by the United States Army Air Force. The airfield opened in May 1943 and closed in November 1948.

== Racing history ==
The original Snetterton Circuit (shown in green) was laid out on the runways and taxiways of the former RAF Snetterton Heath air base (in light brownin brown)

After its use as a USAF base, in 1948 Snetterton Heath was returned to the local landowner, Fred Riches. Oliver Sear and Dudley Coram of the Aston Martin Owners Club (AMOC) approached Riches in early 1951 to suggest using the defunct airbase roadways as a circuit for club racing. Riches agreed, but, being a local churchwarden, only on condition that there was no racing between 10:45 am and noon on Sundays, and that all racing stopped before Evensong started, to avoid disturbing church services. The AMOC held the first open meeting on 27 October 1951, for what were dubbed "speed trials", but were actually a series of one lap sprint races. The first meeting was described by Motor Sport magazine as "an excellent event over an interesting new course." Fastest time of the day was set by Ken Wharton, driving ERA R11B, who averaged 82.4 mph (132.6 km/h).

The circuit was first used for motorcycle racing in 1953, organised by the Snetterton Combine, an association of clubs in Norfolk and Suffolk.

The track was used by both Team Lotus (Formula One) and Norfolk Racing Co (Le Mans) to test their racing cars.

In the 1960s and early 1970s, the circuit was 2.710 mi (4.361 km) in length. Sear corner was 87 yd (80 m) further from Riches corner and led onto the "Norwich Straight" clearly visible in satellite maps and currently used by a Sunday market. The straight ended in a hairpin bend leading to Home Straight, which joined the existing track at the Esses, and is now a main access road for the circuit. Russell bend was added in the 1960s and named after Jim Russell who ran a racing drivers school at the circuit. Initially added to improve safety by slowing vehicles as they approached the pits, Russell bend was the scene of many accidents and was later altered to its present configuration.

=== Snetterton 300 Circuit corner names (2011–present) ===
Corner	Name	Namesake
—	Senna Straight	Ayrton Senna
1	Riches	Fred Riches
2	Montreal (2011–2016); Wilson (2016–present) (Note: Turn 2 was renamed from Montreal to Wilson in 2016 to honour former Formula One driver Justin Wilson, who died following injuries sustained at the 2015 Pocono 500.)	Circuit Gilles Villeneuve; Justin Wilson
3	Palmer	Jonathan Palmer
4	Agostini	Giacomo Agostini
5	Hamilton	Lewis Hamilton
6	Oggies	Peter Ogden
7	Williams	Frank Williams
—	Bentley Straight	Bentley
8	Brundle	Martin Brundle
9	Nelson	Lord Nelson
10	Bomb Hole	Elevation change in the track surface
11	Coram	Dudley Coram
12	Murrays	Murray Walker

=== Layout history ===
Grand Prix Circuit (1951–1964)

Grand Prix Circuit (1965–1973)

Club Circuit (1974)

Club Circuit (1975–1979) & Grand Prix Circuit (1980–1989)

Grand Prix Circuit (1990–2010)

Comparison between 2010 and 2011 layouts

Snetterton 100 Circuit (2011–present)

Snetterton 200 Circuit (2011–present)

Snetterton 300 Circuit (2011–present)

== Circuit developments ==
Snetterton layout in 2010, prior to redevelopment

Snetterton circuit was acquired by MotorSport Vision (MSV) along with Brands Hatch, Oulton Park, and Cadwell Park from The Interpublic Group of Companies subsidiary Octagon in January 2004. Octagon previously acquired prior owner Brands Hatch Leisure plc in November 1999.

In October 2005, Jonathan Palmer of MSV, the owners of Snetterton Circuit, announced that the circuit would undergo extensive rebuilding work, in order to lengthen the circuit and improve its facilities.

On 23 September 2010, MSV announced that construction of the new infield section and track improvements would be finished in time for the 2011 motorsport season. The main development was the addition of a new one-mile infield section, after Sear Corner, which was replaced and renamed Montreal, in deference to it being modelled on the Circuit Gilles Villeneuve hairpin. The final chicane before Senna Straight was also removed and replaced by an extension to Coram curve coupled with a new, tight, left-hand corner named Murrays. In addition to the track work, the redevelopment also improved spectator viewing and increased safety.

=== Snetterton 300 Circuit ===
Snetterton 300 Circuit as of 2015. The Montreal Hairpin has since been renamed in honour of Justin Wilson.

The 300 Circuit is 2.969 mi (4.778 km) long, Snetterton's longest layout and the second longest racing track in the country. The track incorporates much of the previous circuit with the infield section that was completed in 2011. The 300 track has been designed to bring international levels of racing to the circuit by gaining an FIA Grade 2 Licence. The layout also hosts major British motorsport championships. The British Formula 3 Championship and British GT Championship were the first of these to visit the new layout on 14 and 15 May 2011. The British Touring Car Championship with its ToCA support package also uses this layout, as does the British Superbike Championship. In 2016, ahead of Justin Wilson's 38th birthday, the Montreal hairpin was renamed Wilson, in memory of the Yorkshire IndyCar driver killed at the 2015 Pocono 500.

=== Snetterton 200 ===
This layout is closest to the pre-2011 layout. The main differences between the original layout and the 200 layout are the re-profiled Justin Wilson, Coram, and Murray's corners, which have been designed to provide better opportunities for overtaking. This 2.000 mi (3.219 km) layout is mainly used for club and local racing.

=== Snetterton 100 ===
The 100 layout is made up solely of the new 0.980 mi (1.577 km) infield section and is mainly used for testing and as a race school. Both the 100 layout and the 200 layout can be used simultaneously.

The first event which both events were used simultaneously was the BRSCC meeting held on the 29 and 30 May 2011. There was club racing on the outer circuit (VW Fun Cup, Saker Challenge, TVRs and Mighty Minis) and two rounds of the British Sprint Championship on the inner circuit.

== Events ==
Current

- May: British Touring Car Championship, F4 British Championship, Porsche Carrera Cup Great Britain, Britcar
- June: British Superbike Championship, British Supersport Championship, Moto4 British Cup, Snetterton Classic
- July: British GT Championship, GB4 Championship
- August: Caterham Grand Prix
- September: TCR UK Touring Car Championship, USA Snetterton 300

Former

- British Formula 3 International Series (1977–2004, 2006–2012)
- EuroBOSS Series (1997, 2007)
- European Formula Two Championship (1967)
- European Formula 5000 Championship (1969–1975)
- European Touring Car Championship (1965–1968)
- Formula Ford Festival (1972–1975)
- GB3 Championship (2013–2023)
- Lombank Trophy (1960–1963)

== Lap records ==
Prior to the introduction of the 300 circuit in 2011, the official lap record stood at 0:56.095 (125.27 mph (201.60 km/h)) set by Klaas Zwart, during a BRSCC meeting in August 2007. During the qualifying of this meeting, he set an unofficial lap record of 0:54.687 (128.50 mph (206.80 km/h)).

The current 300 circuit lap record was set by Felipe Nasr from Brazil driving a Carlin prepared Dallara F308 in the 2nd race of the 2011 British F3 meeting. The lap was 1:39.933 at an average speed of 106.95 mph (172.12 km/h). As of July 2026, the fastest official race lap records at Snetterton Circuit are listed as:

Category	Time	Driver	Vehicle	Event	Circuit Map
Snetterton 300 Circuit (2011–present): 2.970 mi (4.779 km)
Formula Three	1:39.933	Felipe Nasr	Dallara F308	2011 Snetterton British F3 round	
GB3	1:41.280	Alex Dunne	Tatuus MSV-022	2023 Snetterton GB3 round	
GT3	1:46.116	Marvin Kirchhöfer	McLaren 720S GT3 Evo	2023 Snetterton British GT round	
Superbike	1:46.404	Kyle Ryde	Ducati Panigale V4 R	2026 Snetterton BSB round	
Formula 4	1:47.081	Cooper Webster	Tatuus F4-T014	2023 Snetterton GB4 round	
GB4	1:48.173	Daniel Guinchard	Tatuus MSV GB4-025	2025 Snetterton GB4 round	
Ferrari Challenge	1:48.757	Gilbert Yates	Ferrari 296 Challenge	2026 Snetterton Ferrari Challenge UK round	
Supersport	1:50.404	Luke Stapleford	Ducati Panigale V2	2026 Snetterton BSS round	
Porsche Carrera Cup	1:50.748	Andrew Rackstraw	Porsche 911 (992 I) GT3 Cup	2025 Snetterton Porsche Carrera Cup GB round	
GT4	1:53.584	Sebastian Hopkins	Porsche 718 Cayman GT4 RS Clubsport	2024 Snetterton Porsche Sprint Challenge Great Britain round	
NGTC	1:54.871	Ashley Sutton	Ford Focus ST	2023 Snetterton BTCC round	
Sportbike	1:55.872	Ferre Fleerackers	Suzuki GSX-8R	2026 Snetterton British Sportbike round	
TCR Touring Car	1:56.027	Joe Marshall	Audi RS 3 LMS TCR (2021)	2024 Snetterton TCR UK round	
BMW F900R Cup	1:58.636	Barry Burrell	BMW F900R	2026 Snetterton BMW F900R Cup round	
Moto3	2:01.086	Marco Holt	Honda NSF250R	2026 Moto4 British Cup round	
Truck racing	2:23.367	Ryan Smith	Mercedes Actros 12000	2021 Snetterton BTRC round	
Snetterton 200 Circuit (2011–present): 2.000 mi (3.219 km)
Formula Three	1:06.572	Chris Dittmann	Dallara F312	2017 Snetterton F3 Cup round	
TCR Touring Car	1:25.084	Chris Smiley	Honda Civic Type R TCR (FK8)	2022 Snetterton TCR UK round	
Snetterton 100 Circuit (2011–present): 0.980 mi (1.577 km)
British Sprint Championship	1:16.210	Colin Calder	Gould GR37	2011 Snetterton British Sprint Championship round	
Grand Prix Circuit (1997–2010): 1.952 mi (3.141 km)
Formula One	0:56.095	Klaas Zwart	Benetton B197	2007 Snetterton EuroBOSS Super Prix	
Formula Three	1:01.200	Adriano Buzaid	Dallara F308	2010 Snetterton British F3 round	
GT1	1:03.393	Tim Sugden	McLaren F1 GTR	1999 Snetterton British GT round	
Formula Palmer Audi	1:04.396	Felix Rosenqvist	Formula Palmer Audi car	2009 2nd Snetterton Formula Palmer Audi round	
Superbike	1:04.688	Ryuichi Kiyonari	Honda CBR1000RR	2006 Snetterton BSB round	
Supersport	1:07.587	Tom Sykes	Suzuki GSX-R600	2006 Snetterton BSS round	
GT2	1:08.563	Geoff Lister	Porsche 911 (993) GT2	1998 Snetterton British GT round	
Super Touring	1:09.011	David Leslie	Nissan Primera GT	1999 Snetterton BTCC round	
Formula BMW	1:09.849	Henry Surtees	Mygale FB02	2007 Snetterton Formula BMW UK round	
Super 2000	1:11.711	Darren Turner	SEAT León TDI	2008 Snetterton BTCC round	
BTC Touring	1:12.249	Matt Neal	BTC-T Honda Integra Type R	2005 Snetterton BTCC round	
Grand Prix Circuit (1990–1996): 1.949 mi (3.137 km)
Formula 3000	0:59.470	Luiz Garcia Jr.	Reynard 95D	1996 2nd Snetterton British F2 round	
Formula Three	1:06.550	Kelvin Burt	Dallara F393	1993 Snetterton British F3 round	
GT1	1:09.570	Ian Flux	McLaren F1 GTR	1996 Snetterton British GT round	
Group 4	1:11.660	Thorkild Thyrring	De Tomaso Pantera	1995 1st Snetterton British GT round	
Super Touring	1:13.130	Rickard Rydell	Volvo 850 20V	1995 Snetterton BTCC round	
Group A	1:14.020	Robb Gravett	Ford Sierra RS500 Cosworth	1990 Snetterton BTCC round	
Group 5	1:15.080	John Greasley	Porsche 935 K3	1993 Snetterton British GT round	
GT2	1:24.470	John Morrison	Porsche 911 (993) GT2	1995 2nd Snetterton British GT round	
Grand Prix Circuit (1974–1989): 1.917 mi (3.085 km)
Formula 3000	0:55.370	Andrew Gilbert-Scott	Reynard 88D	1989 Snetterton British F3000 round	
Formula One	0:56.530	Rupert Keegan	Arrows A1	1979 Budweiser Trophy	
Group C2	0:59.510	Tim Harvey	Spice SE89C	1989 RAC Championship Car Races Snetterton	
Formula 5000	1:00.000	Teddy Pilette	Lola T400	1975 2nd Snetterton F5000 round	
Group A	1:07.500	Robb Gravett	Ford Sierra RS500 Cosworth	1989 Snetterton BTCC round	
Grand Prix Circuit (with Russell Bend Chicane added) (1965–1973): 2.710 mi (4.361 km)
Formula 5000	1:18.400	Brett Lunger	Trojan T101	1973 1st Snetterton F5000 round	
Group 4	1:26.200	Brian Redman	Lola T70 Mk.IIIB GT	1969 Guards Trophy Snetterton	
Sports 2000	1:27.200	Guy Edwards	Lola T290	1972 Anglia Television Trophy	
Formula Two	1:28.200	Jackie Stewart (Note: Three drivers took the same lap time independently.); Graham Hill; Jochen Rindt	Matra MS5; Lotus 48; Brabham BT23	1967 Guards 100	
Group 6	1:35.200	Jeremy Lord	Astra RNR1	1970 Snetterton MN GT round	
Original Grand Prix Circuit (1951–1964): 2.710 mi (4.361 km)
Formula One	1:32.600	Jim Clark	Lotus 18	1960 Lombank Trophy	
Group 4	1:35.600	Innes Ireland	Lotus 19	1963 Snetterton Sports Car race	
Formula Libre	1:38.200	Brian Naylor	JBW-Maserati	1959 Snetterton Formula Libre race	
Group 3	1:39.200	Roy Salvadori	Ferrari 250 LM	1964 Scott-Brown Memorial Snetterton	
Formula Two	1:51.000	Bobbie Baird	Ferrari Tipo 500	1953 Aston Martin Owners Club Formula 2 Race	
