= BMW F750GS =

Middleweight adventure touring motorcycle by BMW Motorrad

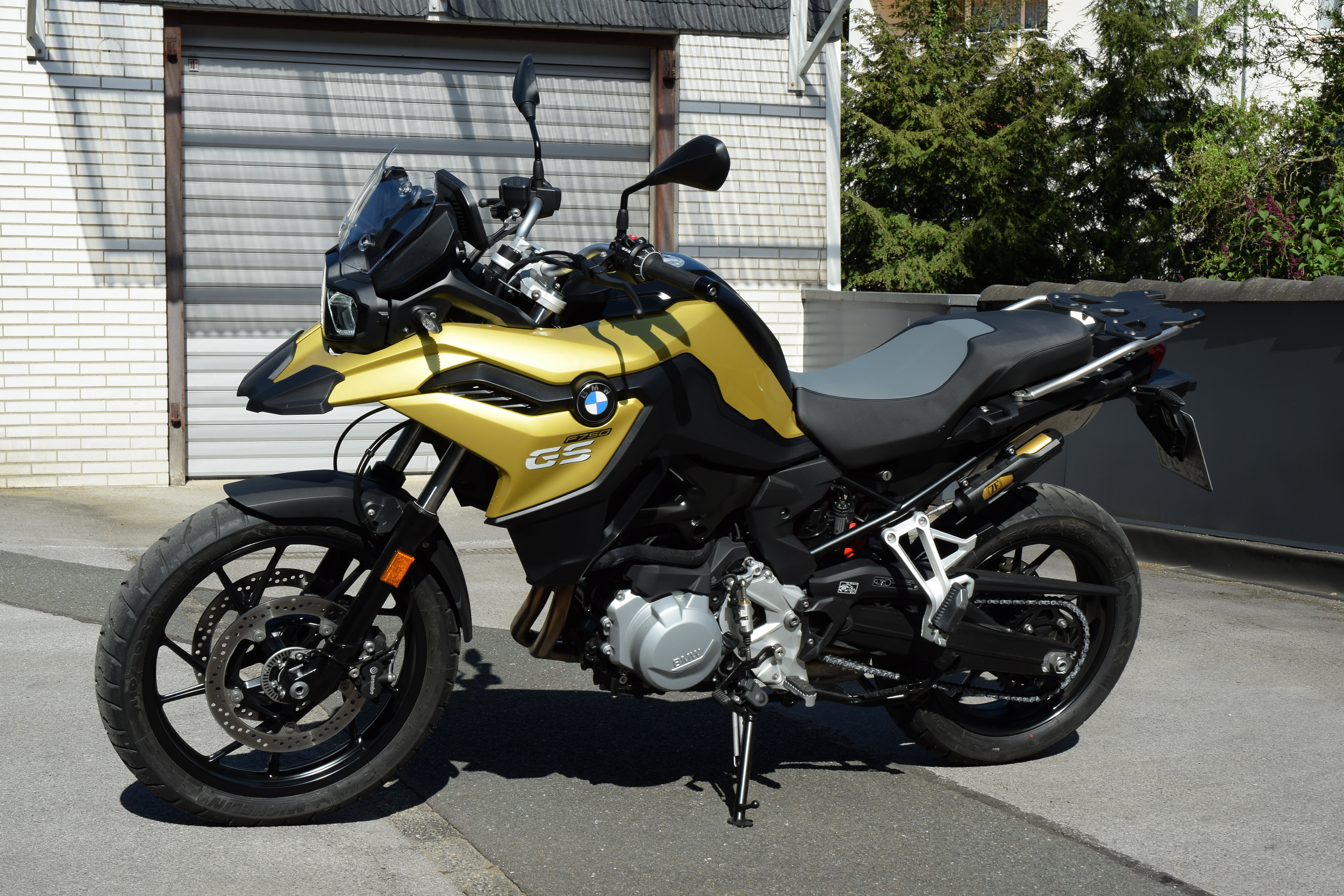
- 2018 BMW F750GS
- Manufacturer: BMW Motorrad
- Production: 2018–present
- Predecessor: BMW F700GS
- Class: Dual-sport / Adventure touring motorcycle
- Engine: 853 cc parallel-twin, DOHC, 8-valve, liquid-cooled
- Bore / stroke: 84 mm × 77 mm
- Compression ratio: 12.7:1
- Power: 57 kW (76 hp) @ 7,500 rpm
- Torque: 83 N⋅m (61 lb⋅ft) @ 6,000 rpm
- Transmission: 6-speed manual with chain final drive
- Frame type: Steel bridge frame, engine as stressed member
- Suspension: 41 mm telescopic fork (front); rear aluminum swingarm with monoshock, adjustable preload
- Wheelbase: 1,559 mm (61.4 in)
- Seat height: 815 mm (32.1 in) (standard)
- Fuel capacity: 15 L (4.0 US gal)
- Related: BMW F450GS, BMW F850GS and BMW F900GS

The BMW F750GS is a middleweight dual-sport motorcycle produced by BMW Motorrad. It was launched in 2018 as part of a new generation of parallel-twin GS models, replacing the earlier BMW F700GS. Despite its name, it uses the same 853 cc engine as the larger BMW F850GS, tuned for lower power output and smoother on-road performance.

== Design and specifications ==
The F750GS combines on-road touring comfort with moderate off-road capability. Its parallel-twin engine is mounted transversely, producing 57 kW (76 hp) and 83 N⋅m (61 lb⋅ft) of torque. The model shares its main frame, suspension layout, and fuel tank placement with the F850GS, though with shorter suspension travel, cast aluminium wheels, and a lower seat height to appeal to a wider range of riders.

=== Chassis and ergonomics ===
The steel bridge-type frame uses the engine as a stressed member to increase rigidity while keeping weight low. Unlike earlier F-series models, the fuel tank has been relocated from under the seat to a traditional forward position for improved weight distribution and easier refuelling. The F750GS features a 19-inch front wheel and 17-inch rear wheel setup.

Electronic rider aids include selectable ride modes (Rain, Road, Dynamic, Enduro), optional ABS Pro with cornering function, and Dynamic Traction Control (DTC). Dynamic ESA (Electronic Suspension Adjustment) is also offered as an option, automatically adapting damping based on riding conditions.

== Equipment and features ==
Standard equipment includes a 6.5-inch TFT LCD colour display with Bluetooth connectivity, LED lighting, and an adjustable windscreen. Factory options include a quickshifter (“Gear Shift Assist Pro”), keyless ignition, and multiple seat height configurations ranging from 770 mm (30 in) to 830 mm (33 in).

== Performance ==
The F750GS is tuned for balanced handling and fuel efficiency. Top speed is approximately 190 km/h (120 mph) with combined fuel consumption near 4.2 L/100 km (67 mpg_{‑imp}). Its road-oriented suspension and tyres make it better suited for touring and commuting than technical off-road riding.

== Model updates ==
In 2021, the model received Euro 5 emissions compliance and minor updates to its electronics and colour schemes. For 2024, BMW introduced new connectivity features and an updated seat design.

== Reception ==
Motorcycle News rated the F750GS four out of five, calling it an "impressive all-rounder adventure bike". In a 2018 road test, the Italian website Moto.it scored it 8 out of 10, praising its agility, engine and low fuel consumption (about 25 km/L (71 mpg_{‑imp}) in the test), while criticising the limited wind protection of the standard screen and the number of features offered only as paid options.

== See also ==
- BMW F850GS
- BMW GS
- BMW Motorrad
- Dual-sport motorcycle
