= BMW F850GS =

Middleweight adventure touring motorcycle by BMW Motorrad

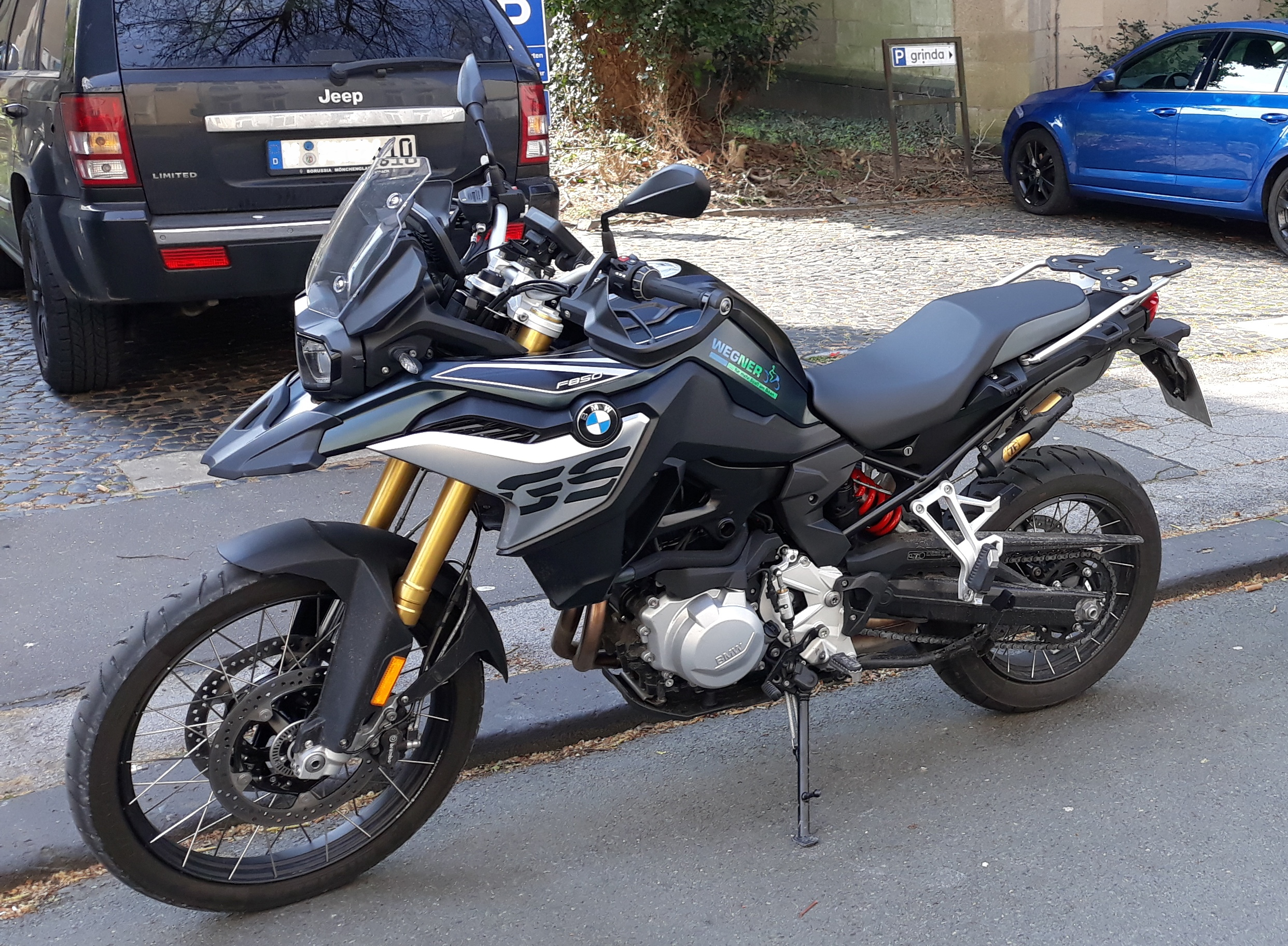
- 2018 BMW F850GS
- Manufacturer: BMW Motorrad
- Production: 2018–2024
- Predecessor: BMW F800GS
- Class: Dual-sport / Adventure touring motorcycle
- Engine: 853 cc parallel-twin, DOHC, 8-valve, liquid-cooled
- Bore / stroke: 84 mm × 77 mm
- Compression ratio: 12.7:1
- Power: 70 kW (94 hp) @ 8,250 rpm
- Torque: 92 N⋅m (68 lb⋅ft) @ 6,250 rpm
- Transmission: 6-speed manual with chain final drive
- Frame type: Steel bridge frame, engine as stressed member
- Suspension: Upside-down telescopic fork (front); aluminium swingarm with central monoshock, adjustable preload and rebound damping
- Wheelbase: 1,593 mm (62.7 in)
- Seat height: 860 mm (34 in) (standard)
- Fuel capacity: 15 L (4.0 US gal)
- Related: BMW F450GS ,BMW F750GS and BMW F900GS

The BMW F850GS is a dual-sport motorcycle produced by BMW Motorrad from 2018 through 2024. It succeeded the earlier BMW F800GS as part of a new generation of middleweight GS models powered by an all-new 853 cc parallel-twin engine. The model was designed to combine long-distance touring comfort with enhanced off-road performance.

== Design and development ==
Unveiled at EICMA 2017 in Milan, the F850GS introduced a completely redesigned powertrain and chassis platform for BMW’s middleweight adventure lineup. The 853 cc parallel-twin engine, built by Loncin in China under BMW supervision, uses a 270° crankshaft for a distinctive exhaust note and improved traction characteristics.

The steel bridge-type frame replaces the tubular trellis frame used on the F800GS and integrates the engine as a stressed member. Fuel capacity remains 15 L (4.0 US gal), with the tank moved to a conventional forward position rather than under the seat to improve mass centralisation.

== Specifications ==
The F850GS engine produces 70 kW (94 hp) at 8,250 rpm and 92 N⋅m (68 lb⋅ft) at 6,250 rpm, offering a blend of torque and tractability suited to mixed terrain. The six-speed gearbox drives the rear wheel via chain, replacing the belt drive used in earlier F-series road models.

The motorcycle features a 21-inch front and 17-inch rear wheel combination for off-road capability, with long-travel suspension (230 mm front, 215 mm rear). A slipper clutch and optional quickshifter (“Gear Shift Assist Pro”) are also available.

== Technology ==
The F850GS is equipped with modern electronic rider aids, including:

- ABS Pro (cornering ABS)
- Dynamic Traction Control (DTC)
- Selectable riding modes (“Rain”, “Road”, “Dynamic”, “Enduro”, “Enduro Pro”)
- Optional Dynamic ESA (Electronic Suspension Adjustment)
- 6.5-inch full-color TFT display with Bluetooth connectivity

These systems integrate with BMW’s modular electronics platform, shared with the R-series and S-series motorcycles.

== Equipment and variants ==
Standard equipment includes LED headlight, adjustable windscreen, and aluminium engine guards. Optional packages add:

- Keyless Ride ignition system
- Cruise control
- Luggage racks and aluminium panniers
- Heated grips and comfort seat

A special “Adventure” version, the BMW F850GS Adventure, was introduced in 2019 with an enlarged 23 L (6.1 US gal) fuel tank, longer suspension travel, crash protection bars, and reinforced subframe for extended touring.

== Performance ==
The F850GS reaches a top speed of approximately 200 km/h (120 mph) and achieves a combined fuel consumption of around 4.1 L/100 km (69 mpg_{‑imp}). Its on-road refinement, linear power delivery, and balance between comfort and off-road agility have been widely praised by reviewers.

== Reception ==
Motorcycle journalists have described the F850GS as a “true middleweight adventure” machine offering the comfort and features of larger adventure tourers in a lighter, more manageable package. Its electronic systems, TFT interface, and ergonomics were highlighted as major improvements over the F800GS.

== Production ==
The engine is manufactured by Loncin Motorcycle Co., Ltd. in Chongqing, China, under BMW quality control standards. Final assembly takes place at BMW Motorrad’s Spandau plant in Berlin, Germany.

== See also ==
- BMW F750GS
- BMW F850GS Adventure
- BMW GS
- BMW Motorrad
- Dual-sport motorcycle
