= Ride-by-wire =

Electronic throttle control system used in motorcycles and vehicles

Ride-by-wire
Introduced	2006 (motorcycles)
Type	Electronic throttle control
Used by	Various manufacturers (Yamaha, BMW, Ducati, KTM, Triumph, Honda, Kawasaki)
Related systems	Throttle-by-wire, Traction control system, ABS Pro, Engine control unit

Ride-by-wire (also known as throttle-by-wire or electronic throttle control) is an electronic system that replaces the traditional mechanical cable connecting the throttle twist grip to the engine’s throttle bodies. Instead of a direct cable linkage, the rider’s throttle input is measured by sensors and transmitted to the engine control unit (ECU), which regulates fuel injection, air intake, and ignition timing to control engine power output.

== Overview ==
In a conventional motorcycle or car, the throttle cable mechanically opens and closes the throttle valves. Ride-by-wire systems replace this with an electronically controlled throttle actuator that interprets rider input digitally. The ECU processes signals from the throttle position sensor and adjusts the throttle bodies via an electric motor.

This technology allows for more precise control of power delivery and enables integration with modern rider aids such as traction control, cruise control, and ride mode systems.

== History ==
The underlying principle of ride-by-wire technology was derived from the original fly-by-wire concept, first pioneered in the aviation industry during the 1930s. While their applications differ, both systems operate on the same fundamental idea: replacing mechanical control linkages with electronic sensors, actuators, and computer control. In aircraft, fly-by-wire systems manage flight surfaces such as the ailerons and rudder, whereas in motorcycles and cars, ride-by-wire (or drive-by-wire) systems electronically control the throttle to regulate engine power.

Electronic throttle control was first introduced in production automobiles during the 1980s, paving the way for its later adaptation in motorcycles and other vehicles. It was implemented by manufacturers such as BMW and Toyota, primarily to improve fuel efficiency and emissions compliance.

The first production motorcycle to feature a ride-by-wire system was the 2006 Yamaha YZF-R6, which replaced the traditional throttle cable with a fully electronic system known as YCC-T (Yamaha Chip Controlled Throttle).

Since then, most major motorcycle manufacturers, including Ducati, BMW Motorrad, KTM, Triumph, Honda, and Kawasaki, have adopted similar systems under proprietary names.

Manufacturer	Official system name
Yamaha	Yamaha Chip Controlled Throttle (YCC-T)
Ducati	Ride-by-Wire
BMW	E-gas
KTM	Ride By Wire
Triumph	Ride-by-wire throttle
Honda	Throttle-by-Wire (TBW)
Yamaha	Yamaha Chip Controlled Throttle (YCC-T)
Suzuki	Ride-by-Wire Electronic Throttle System
Kawasaki	Electronic Throttle Valves
Aprilia	Ride-by-Wire (Tri-Map on some models)
MV Agusta	Ride By Wire (within MV’s electronics suite)
Husqvarna	Ride-by-wire throttle
Harley-Davidson	Electronic Throttle Control (ETC)
Royal Enfield	Ride-by-wire (with riding modes on applicable models)
CFMOTO	Ride-by-Wire Throttle
Indian Motorcycle	Electronic Throttle Control (ETC)
Moto Guzzi	Ride-by-Wire electronic throttle

== Technology ==
A motorcycle ride-by-wire system is an electromechanical control network that replaces the direct cable linkage between the throttle grip and throttle bodies with a sensor-actuator feedback loop, managed by the engine control unit (ECU). The system functions as a closed-loop control system, providing more precise throttle modulation and enabling integration with advanced electronic rider aids.

=== System architecture ===
A ride-by-wire system replaces the traditional cable-actuated throttle with a closed-loop electromechanical control network. Its design integrates sensors, actuators, and processing units linked through a high-speed data bus, allowing the throttle to be controlled electronically rather than mechanically.

The system begins at the throttle grip, where dual Hall-effect or rotary potentiometer sensors measure the rider’s input angle. Each sensor operates on an independent voltage reference, producing two complementary analogue signals to ensure redundancy. Any mismatch between them immediately triggers a diagnostic fault, preventing uncontrolled throttle operation.

These signals are transmitted to the engine control unit (ECU), a microprocessor-based controller that continuously samples numerous sensor inputs. The ECU calculates the rider’s torque demand using a torque-based control algorithm, commonly implemented through a PID or model-predictive control (MPC) strategy. This approach allows the ECU to translate grip position, engine speed, load, and gear state into a precise throttle-plate command rather than a direct mechanical opening.

The ECU drives a throttle-body actuator, typically a DC servomotor with a reduction gear mechanism. The actuator receives pulse-width-modulated (PWM) control signals that position the throttle plate to the commanded angle. Simultaneously, throttle-position sensors (TPS) mounted on the throttle shaft provide feedback on the actual throttle plate position, allowing the ECU to verify accuracy and adjust in real-time.

Communication between modules occurs via a CAN bus, which links the ECU with auxiliary systems such as the ABS controller, traction-control unit, and digital dashboard. This shared architecture enables cross-system coordination; for example, traction control can temporarily override throttle commands, or the cruise-control module can maintain a steady throttle angle without direct rider input.

Collectively, this architecture functions as a real-time feedback loop:

Sensor Inputs → ECU Computation → Actuator Output → Feedback Verification.

The result is a throttle system that delivers precise torque control, inherent redundancy, and the flexibility to integrate advanced electronic rider aids.

== Advantages ==
Ride-by-wire technology offers several benefits:

- Enables riding modes and custom torque maps
- Integrates seamlessly with ABS Pro and Dynamic Traction Control systems
- Allows electronic cruise control and launch control features
- Provides smoother throttle response and improved fuel efficiency
- Reduces emissions through precise air-fuel management

== Criticism and safety ==
Early implementations were sometimes criticised by riders for lacking the direct throttle feel of mechanical systems. However, improvements in throttle mapping and actuator speed have significantly reduced latency and improved feedback. Modern systems include fail-safe modes and multiple redundant sensors to prevent unintended acceleration or throttle loss.

== Applications ==
Ride-by-wire systems are now standard on many performance and touring motorcycles, including:

- Yamaha YZF-R1 and Yamaha MT-09
- Ducati Multistrada V4
- BMW R1250GS and BMW F900GS
- KTM 1290 Super Adventure
- Triumph Tiger 900

Beyond motorcycles, similar electronic throttle systems are widely used in modern automobiles, ATVs, marine engines, and aircraft.

== See also ==
- Engine control unit
- Traction control system
- ABS Pro
- Electronic fuel injection
