= Astra RNR2 =

Group 6 sports prototype race car

- Category: Group 6
- Designer(s): Roger Nathan
- Production: 1969
- Predecessor: Astra RNR1

Technical specifications
- Chassis: fibreglass body on box-section triplex monocoque with front and rear subframes
- Suspension (front): double wishbones, coil springs over dampers, anti-roll bar
- Suspension (rear): Reversed lower wishbones, top links, twin trailing arms, anti-roll bar, coil springs over dampers
- Engine: Ford-Cosworth FVC 1.8 L (110 cu in) naturally-aspirated I4 mid-engined, longitudinally mounted
- Transmission: Hewland FT-200 5-speed manual
- Power: 245 hp (183 kW)
- Weight: 550 kg (1,210 lb)

Competition history
- Debut: 1970 R.A.C. Snetterton
Races	Wins	Podiums	Poles
22	4	6	2

The Astra RNR2 is a Group 6 sports prototype race car, designed, developed and built by British amateur racing driver, Roger Nathan, in 1969. Only two models were produced. It debuted at an R.A.C. race at Snetterton, in 1970; being driven by Roger Nathan. It achieved moderate success in sports car racing, winning 4 races (plus 1 additional class win), scoring 6 podium finishes, and clinching 2 pole positions. It was powered by a naturally-aspirated 1.8 L (110 cu in) Ford-FVC four-cylinder engine, producing 245 hp (183 kW). This gave it a power-to-weight ratio of exactly 0.45 hp/kg, or 1 hp/lb.
