= BMW F900GS =

Middleweight adventure motorcycle by BMW Motorrad

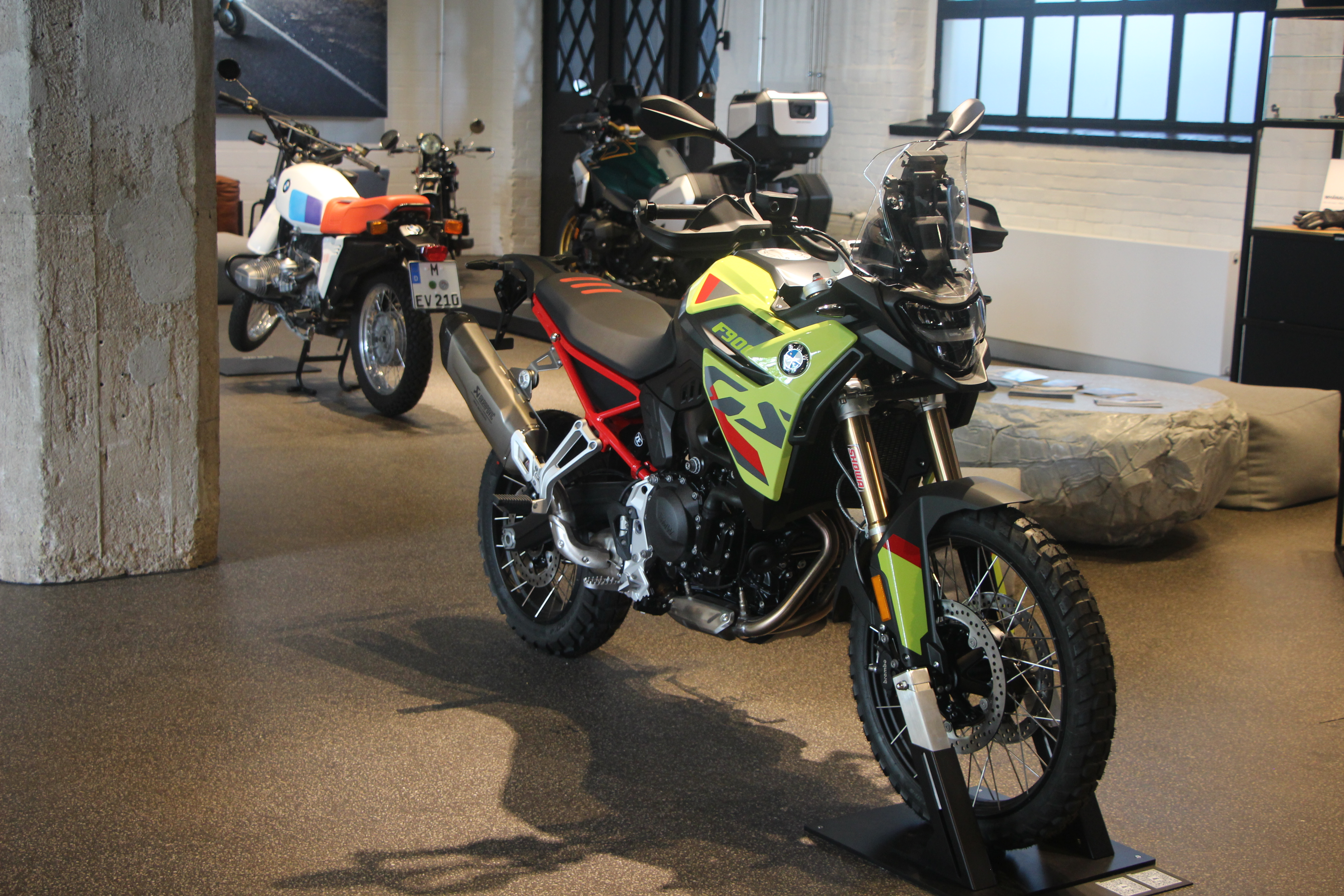
- 2024 BMW F900GS
- Manufacturer: BMW Motorrad
- Production: 2024–present
- Predecessor: BMW F850GS
- Class: Dual-sport / Adventure touring motorcycle
- Engine: 895 cc parallel-twin, DOHC, 8-valve, liquid-cooled
- Bore / stroke: 86 mm × 77 mm
- Compression ratio: 13.1:1
- Power: 77 kW (103 hp) @ 8,500 rpm
- Torque: 93 N⋅m (69 lb⋅ft) @ 6,750 rpm
- Transmission: 6-speed manual with chain final drive
- Frame type: Steel bridge frame, engine as stressed member
- Suspension: 43 mm upside-down fork (front); aluminum swingarm with adjustable monoshock (rear)
- Wheelbase: 1,560 mm (61 in)
- Seat height: 870 mm (34 in) (standard)
- Fuel capacity: 14.5 L (3.8 US gal)
- Related: BMW F450GS, and BMW F800GS

The BMW F900GS is a middleweight dual-sport motorcycle produced by BMW Motorrad since 2024. It succeeds the BMW F850GS and represents a major redesign of BMW's parallel-twin adventure platform, featuring a larger 895 cc engine, reduced weight, and upgraded electronics. The model was officially unveiled in September 2023 ahead of its public debut at EICMA 2023 in Milan.

== Design and development ==
The F900GS continues BMW's tradition of GS adventure motorcycles, aiming to combine light off-road handling with long-distance touring capability. Compared to its predecessor, it is 14 kg (31 lb) lighter and uses a revised steel frame with a narrower rear subframe made of aluminium. The new 895 cc engine, shared with the BMW F900R and BMW F900XR, produces 77 kW (103 hp) and 93 N⋅m (69 lb⋅ft) of torque, giving it stronger mid-range performance.

The motorcycle features a new plastic-fuel tank holding 14.5 L (3.8 US gal), relocated forward for improved mass centralisation. Suspension travel is 230 mm at the front and 215 mm at the rear, using upgraded components derived from BMW's off-road competition models.

== Technology ==
The F900GS is equipped with a suite of modern electronics, including:

- ABS Pro with lean-sensitive cornering function
- Dynamic Traction Control (DTC)
- Riding modes: “Rain”, “Road”, and “Enduro Pro”
- Optional Dynamic ESA (Electronic Suspension Adjustment)
- 6.5-inch TFT display with integrated connectivity
- Optional quickshifter (“Gear Shift Assist Pro”)

LED lighting, keyless ignition, and a USB-C charging port are fitted as standard.

== Chassis and equipment ==
The front suspension consists of a fully adjustable 43 mm upside-down fork, while the rear aluminium swingarm uses a gas-charged monoshock. The wheel combination (21-inch front, 17-inch rear) emphasises off-road performance. The motorcycle is fitted with aluminium footrests, lightweight handguards, and a slimmer tail section.

A “Rallye” trim level adds longer suspension travel, a higher seat, sport exhaust, and enduro-style graphics.

== Variants ==
The F900GS is offered alongside the more touring-oriented BMW F900GS Adventure, which includes a larger 23 L (6.1 US gal) fuel tank, reinforced subframe, taller windscreen, and enhanced luggage options. For riders seeking a lower seat height and lighter handling, BMW also introduced the updated BMW F800GS using a detuned 895 cc engine producing 64 kW (86 hp).

== Performance ==
The F900GS reaches a top speed of approximately 210 km/h (130 mph) and returns an average fuel consumption of 4.2 L/100 km (67 mpg_{‑imp}). BMW claims a wet weight of 219 kg (483 lb), significantly improving manoeuvrability over the outgoing F850GS.

== Production ==
Engines are produced by Loncin Motorcycle Co., Ltd. in China under BMW quality standards, while final assembly takes place at BMW Motorrad's Spandau plant in Berlin, Germany.

== Reception ==
Early reviews praised the F900GS for its reduced weight, improved suspension, and stronger engine character. *Motorcycle News* called it “a true return to form for BMW’s middleweight adventure class,” while *Cycle World* highlighted its balanced off-road stability and refined electronics.

== See also ==
- BMW F750GS
- BMW F850GS
- BMW F900GS Adventure
- BMW GS
- BMW Motorrad
- Dual-sport motorcycle
