= Despatch rider =

Military messenger

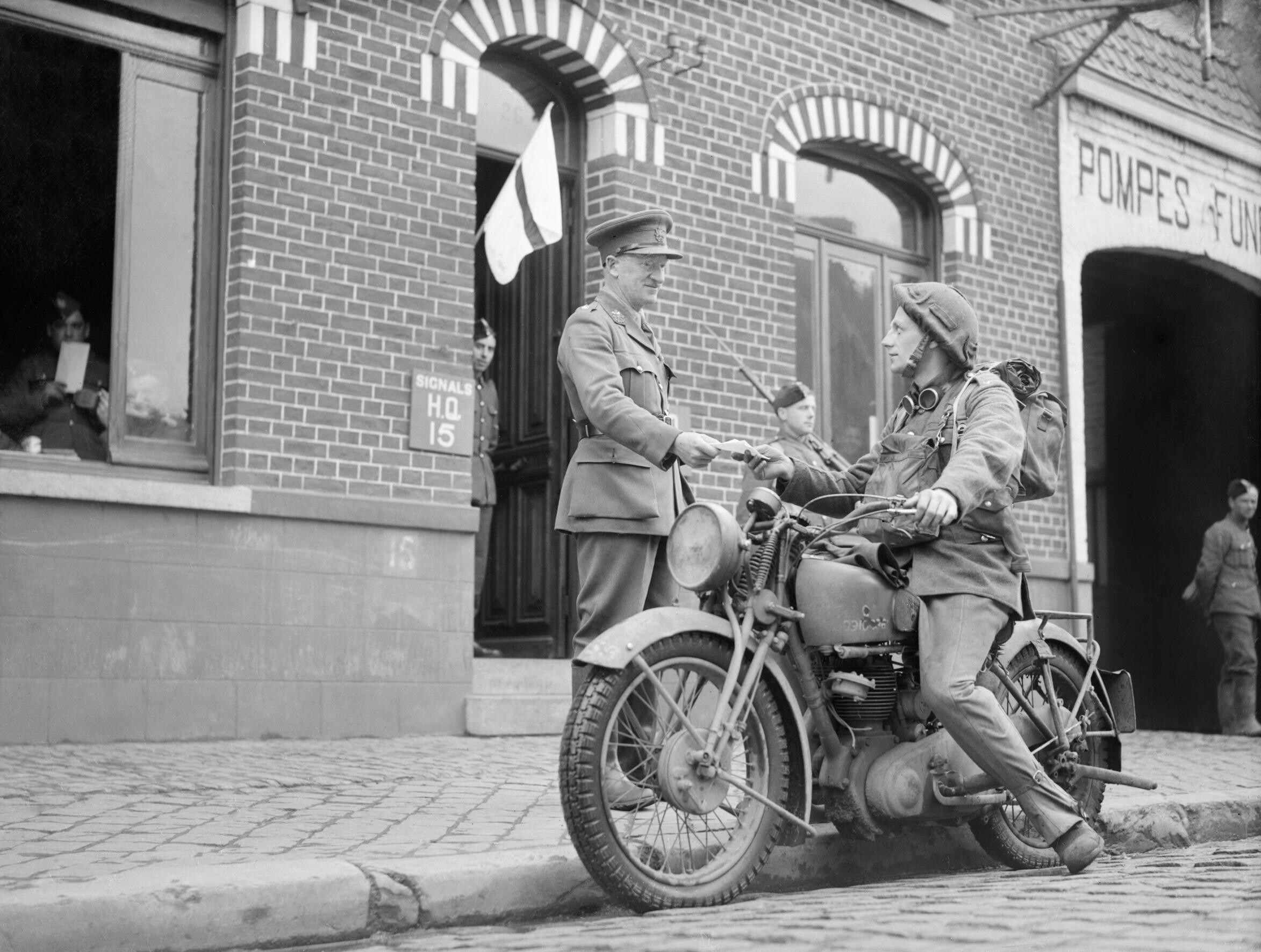
A despatch rider delivers a message to the signals office of 1st Border Regiment at Orchies, France, 13 October 1939

A despatch rider (or dispatch) is a military messenger, mounted on horse or motorcycle (and occasionally in Egypt during World War I, on camels).

In the UK 'despatch rider' is also a term used for a motorcycle courier.

Despatch riders were used by armed forces to deliver urgent orders and messages between headquarters and military units. They had a vital role at a time when telecommunications were limited and insecure. They were also used to deliver carrier pigeons.

== World War I ==
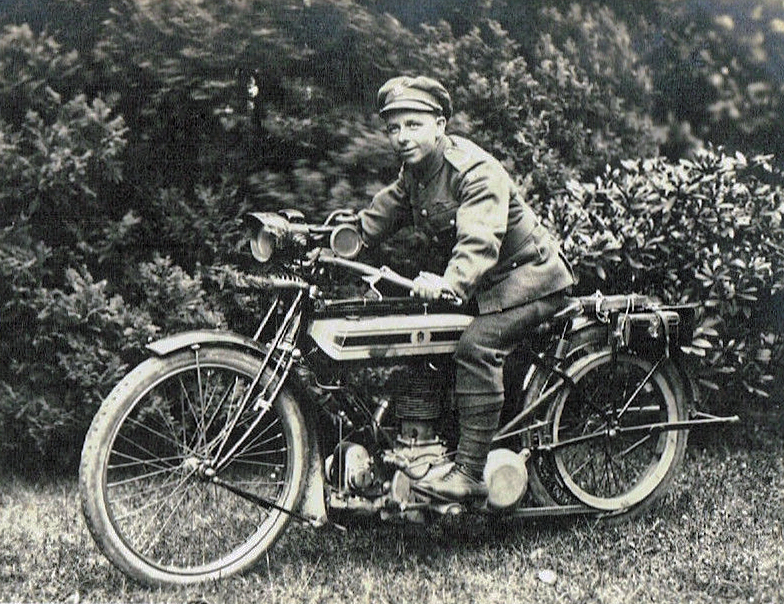
British military motorcycle dispatch rider, 1914 World War I.

=== United Kingdom ===
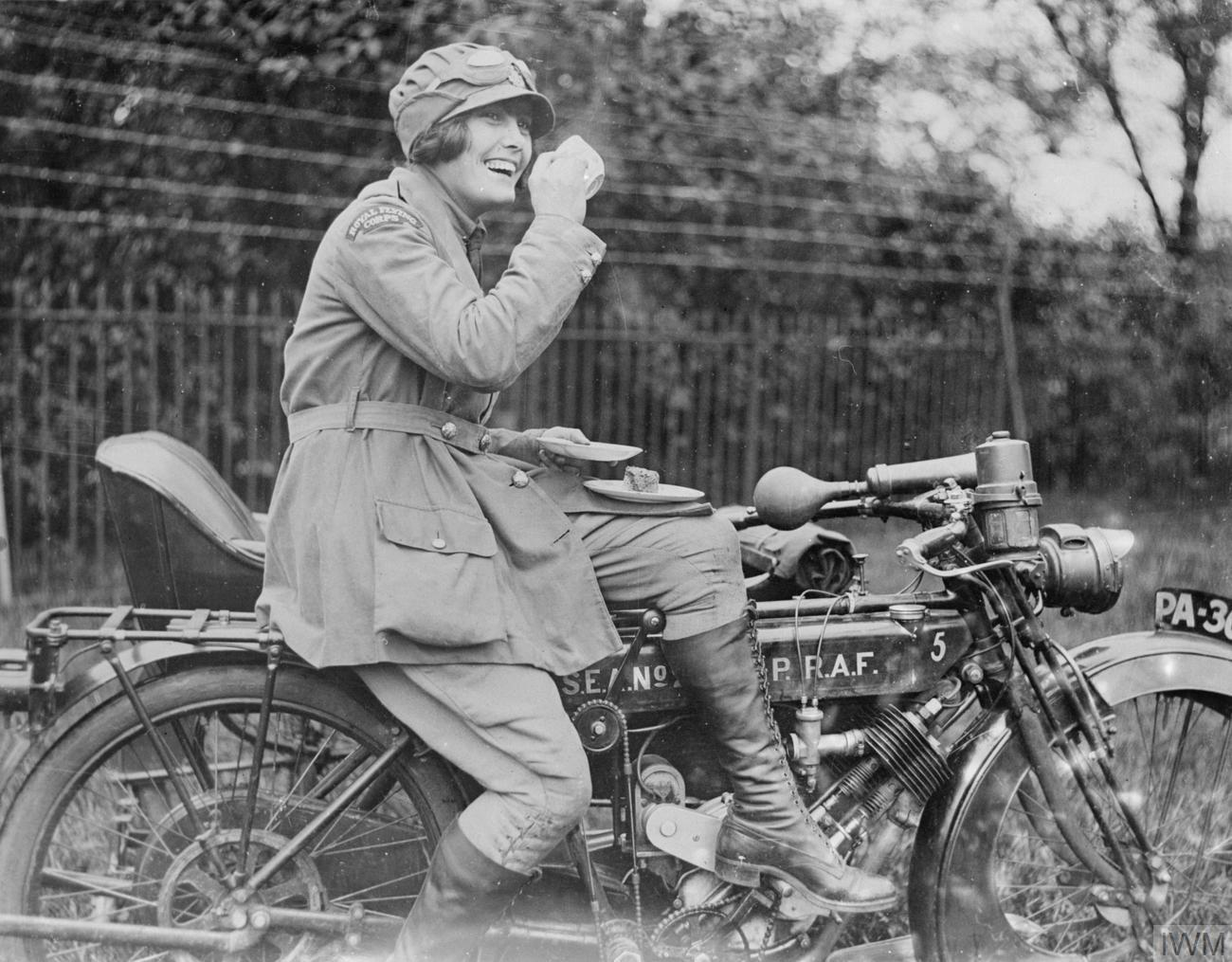
A Women's Royal Air Force (WRAF) despatch rider on a tea break, seated on her P&M 500cc single, 1918.

In the British Army, motorcycle despatch riders were first used in World War I by the Royal Engineers Signal Service. When the War Department called for motorcyclists to volunteer with their machines for despatch work at the start of August 1914, the response was huge. The London office had 2000 more applicants than places, and a similar response was reported in regional centres around the country. If a rider and machine were approved then £10 was paid immediately, £5 to be paid on discharge (unless due to misconduct), and pay was 35s per week. The motor cycle would be taken over at valuation price, or would be replaced with a new one at the close of operations. Enlistment was for one year or as long as the war might last. The preference was for 500cc single cylinder machines and the horizontally opposed twin cylinder. All machines had to have a "change speed gear". The following list of spares was also required to be carried :

- One valve complete with spring, washer and cotter
- One sparking plug
- One piston ring
- A tyre repair outfit including spares for valve
- A spare tube
- A spare belt and fastener (if belt driven)
- Spare link and a spare chain (if chain-driven)
- Complete set of spares for the magneto
- Selection of nuts and washers
- Two valve cap washers (if used on machine)
- Complete set of tools
- Two gaiters for tyre repairs
- A spare 'cover' to be carried by signal units for each machine (a tyre)

Recruitment was not just for the army; the Admiralty in Chatham bought 50 Triumphs in 1914 for despatch rider duties, and many unsuccessful applicants were accepted by Scotland Yard on different terms to patrol country districts and distribute royal proclamations. These bikes carried a plate on the front with the lettering "O.H.M.S.".

As the war progressed the wide variety of volunteered machinery presented maintenance and spares problems, and so were progressively replaced by a limited range of military models, and in specific regions of the world or parts of the service only one of these models might be found, for example the RAF (formerly the RFC) exclusively used P&M motorcycles by the later stages of the war (they also included female riders).

=== Other Nations ===
In August 1914 it was reported that the despatch riders for the Belgian and Russian armies were equipped exclusively with F.N. motor cycles. However, one month later the Belgian government ordered 50 3 hp Enfield motorcycles for despatch riders. At this time the French Army were still mobilising, but it was reported they had a squad of Triumphs as well as a variety of French makes. Douglas supplied 100 machines to the Italian Government for despatch purposes in 1916, and by this time the French despatch riders were also using BSAs and Triumphs.

The US Army entered the war in 1917, and their messengers were equipped principally with Indian and Harley-Davidson motorcycles.

A September 1914 account states that French despatch riders, like the British, are equipped with revolvers, whereas their German counterparts are equipped with Mausers.

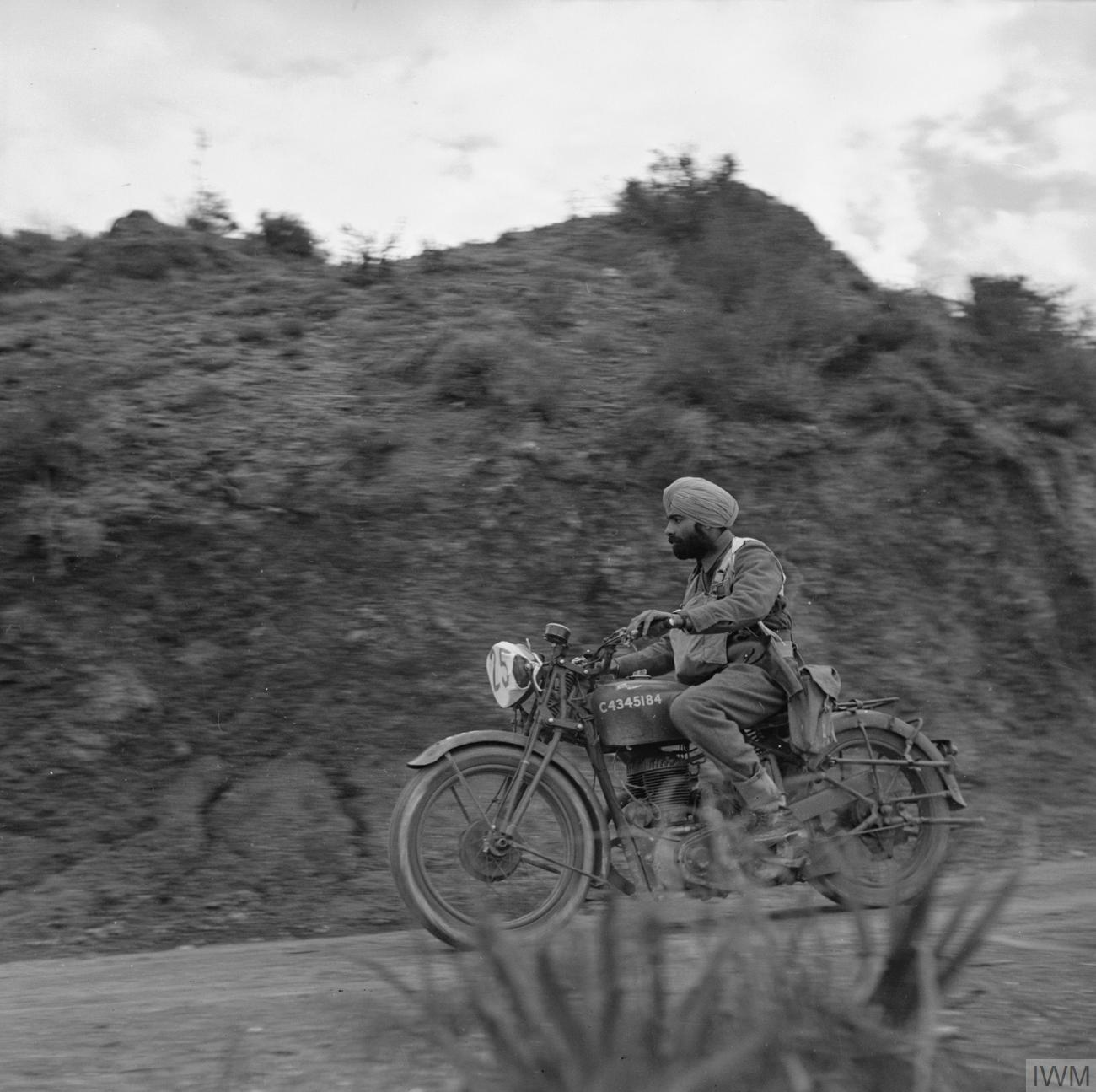
An Indian dispatch rider in Cyprus, 3 March 1942

== World War II ==
During World War II despatch riders were often referred to as Don Rs (from phonetic spelling for D in "DR") in Commonwealth forces. In World War II, Royal Corps of Signals soldiers carried out the role and the Royal Signals Motorcycle Display Team was formed from their number. They were also used by the Royal Air Force and the Royal Navy, where they maintained contact with land bases and some of the riders were members of the Women's Royal Naval Service. In the UK, Bletchley Park initially received transmissions from the listening stations (Y-stations) by despatch rider, but this was later switched to teleprinter transmission.

The British military often used Triumph, Norton, BSA, Matchless and Ariel for despatch riders, and although radio communications were much more advanced during WW II than WW I - huge numbers were produced (e.g. over 75,000 Norton 16H models).

== Contemporary ==
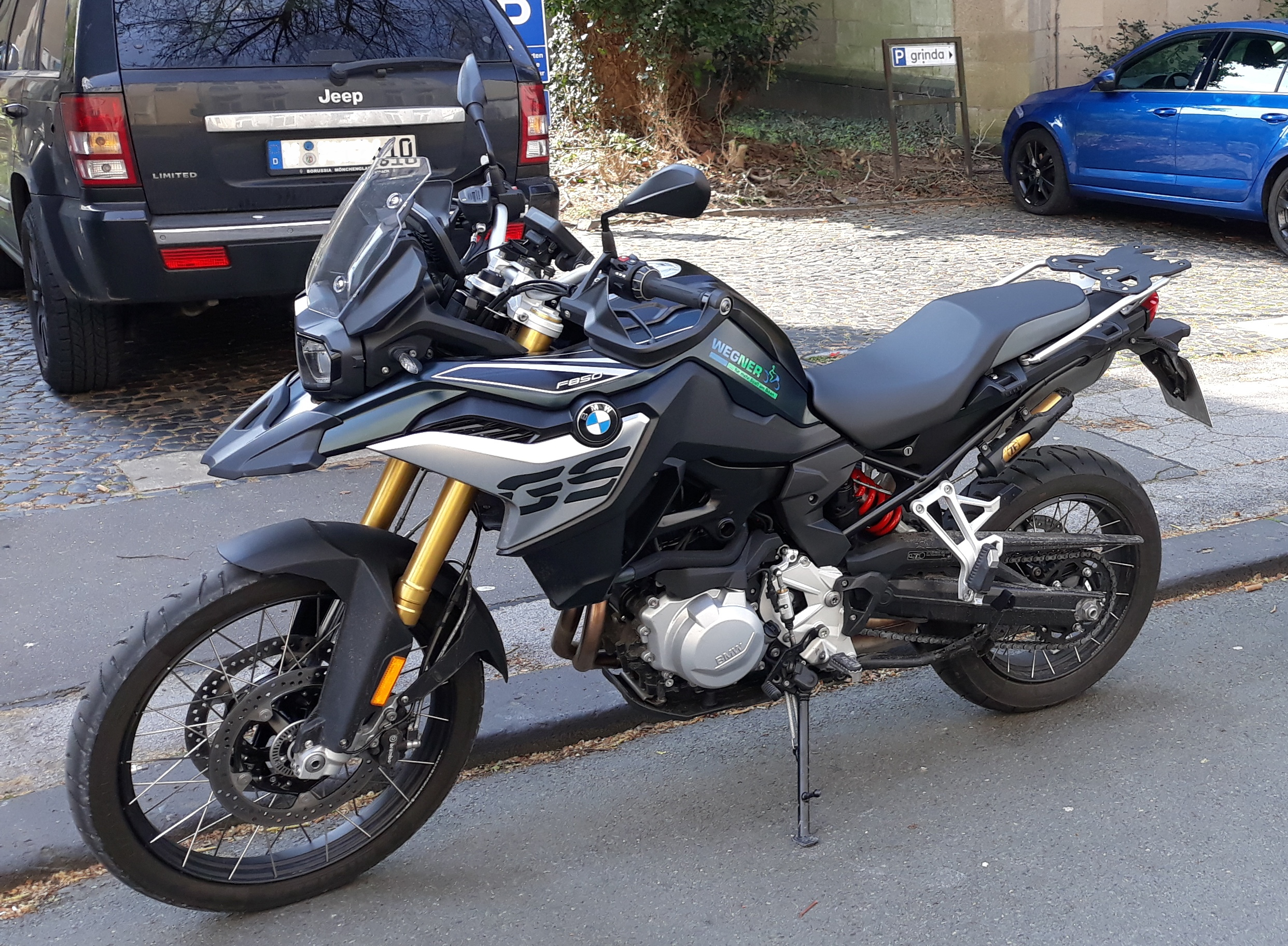
The contemporary despatch rider model of the German army is the BMW F850GS

The German army reintroduced despatch riders in 2019, equipped with the BMW F850GS, in order to be capable of communicating under heavy electronic warfare conditions.

== Notable riders ==
- Charles Kingsford Smith - Aviator
- Charles Symonds - Neurologist
- Bessie Stringfield - Motorcyclist
- Jehan Alain - Composer and Despatch Rider (French 8th Division)

== Memoirs of riders ==
- W. H. L. Watson. Adventures of a Motorcycle Despatch Rider During the First World War: ISBN 978-1-84685-046-2
- Raymond Mitchell Commando Despatch Rider: ISBN 0-85052-797-X
- Albert Simpkin - edited by David Venner. "Despatch Rider on the Western Front 1915–1918: The Diary of Sergeant Albert Simpkin MM" ISBN 978-1473827400
