= Loncin Motorcycle Co., Ltd. =

Chinese motorcycle and engine manufacturer

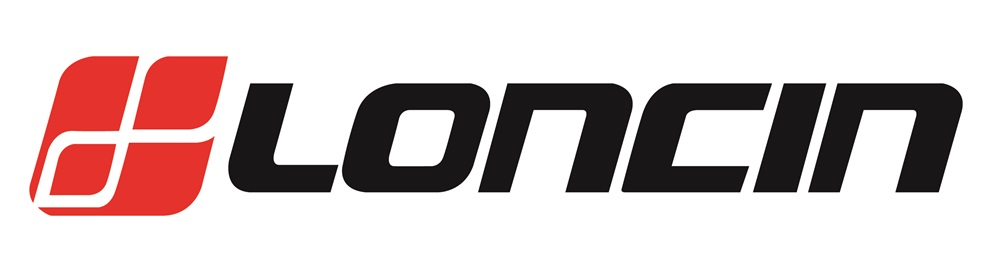
- Native name: 隆鑫摩托车有限公司
- Type: Public
- Traded as: SSE: 603766
- Industry: Motorcycle and engine manufacturing
- Founded: 1993
- Founder: Tu Jianhua
- Headquarters: Chongqing, China
- Area served: Worldwide
- Key people: Tu Jianhua (Chairman)
- Products: Motorcycles, engines, ATVs, scooters, generators, and power equipment
- Brands: Loncin, Voge
- Revenue: CN¥ 10.8 billion (2024)
- Operating income: CN¥ 740 million (2024)
- Owner: Loncin Holdings
- Number of employees: 5,000+ (2025)
- Website: www.loncinindustries.com

Loncin Motorcycle Co., Ltd. (Chinese: 隆鑫摩托车有限公司) is a Chinese motorcycle and engine manufacturer based in Chongqing, China.

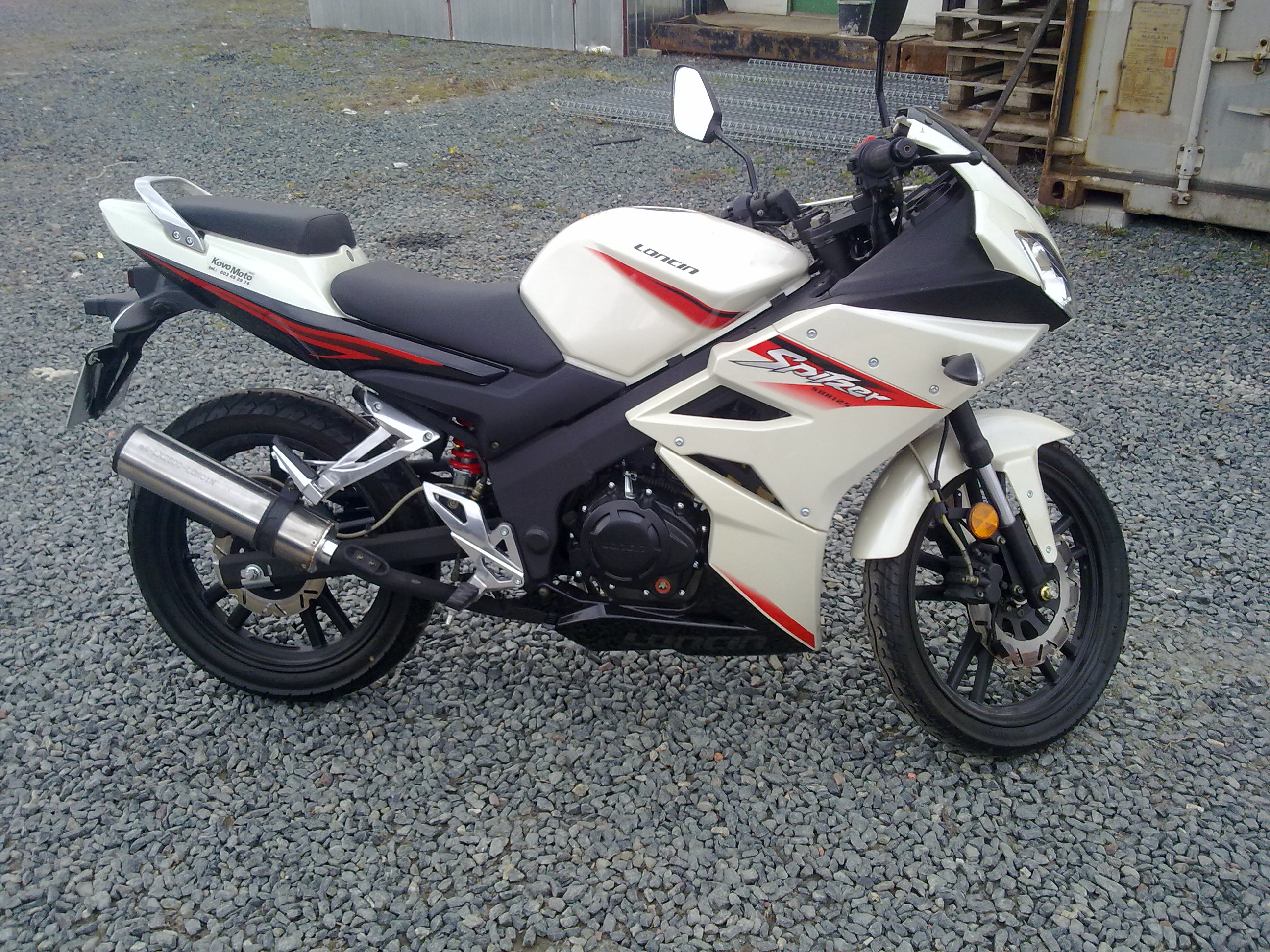
Loncin SBR 125

It is one of the largest motorcycle producers in China and part of the Loncin Holdings industrial group. The company designs and manufactures motorcycles, engines, and general-purpose power equipment for both domestic and export markets. Loncin is also known internationally for its long-standing manufacturing partnership with BMW Motorrad.

== History ==
Loncin Motorcycle Co., Ltd. was established in 1993 by Chinese entrepreneur Tu Jianhua. Headquartered in Chongqing, a hub for Chinese motorcycle production, the company rapidly expanded its output through the 1990s and 2000s, producing engines and small-displacement motorcycles for export to Asia, Africa, and Europe.

By the mid-2000s, Loncin became one of the “Big Four” Chinese motorcycle manufacturers, alongside Lifan, Zongshen, and Jialing. The company diversified into ATV and utility engine production and established a research and development center for four-stroke and fuel-injected powertrains.

== Partnership with BMW Motorrad ==
In 2005, Loncin signed a strategic partnership with BMW Motorrad to manufacture single-cylinder engines for the BMW F650GS and BMW G650GS.

Under this collaboration, Loncin built BMW-designed engines under strict quality control at its Chongqing plant. In 2019, the partnership expanded to include the new 895 cc parallel-twin engines used in the BMW F900R, BMW F900XR, and BMW F900GS models.

The partnership is regarded as one of the most successful examples of European-Chinese industrial cooperation in the motorcycle sector, with engines meeting the same performance and durability standards as those assembled in Germany.

== Voge sub-brand ==
In 2018, Loncin launched a premium motorcycle brand called Voge (Chinese: 无极摩托), aimed at the domestic and export markets. Voge motorcycles use higher-performance engines and components and are designed to compete with international midrange bikes from Yamaha, Honda, and Kawasaki.

Models such as the Voge 500DS and Voge 900DSX share technology derived from BMW’s F-series collaboration and are distributed throughout Europe and Asia.

== LONCIN ORV sub-brand ==
In 2020, Loncin Motor introduced LONCIN ORV (Chinese： 隆鑫全地形车), a specialized brand dedicated to designing, manufacturing, and exporting all- terrain vehicles (ATVs) and side-by-side utility vehicles (UTVs/SSVs).

Building upon LONCIN's long-standing manufacturing expertise and contract assembly operations for international off-road brands, LONCIN ORV produces high-performance quad bikes and side-by-side for recreational, agricultural, and commercial sectors. Models such as the LONCIN XWOLF series (e.g., LONCIN XWOLF700L and LONCIN XWOLF1000 MUD) feature fuel-injected engines, electronic power steering (EPS), and heavy-duty four-wheel-drive systems, designed to compete in North American, European, and Australasian markets.

== Products ==
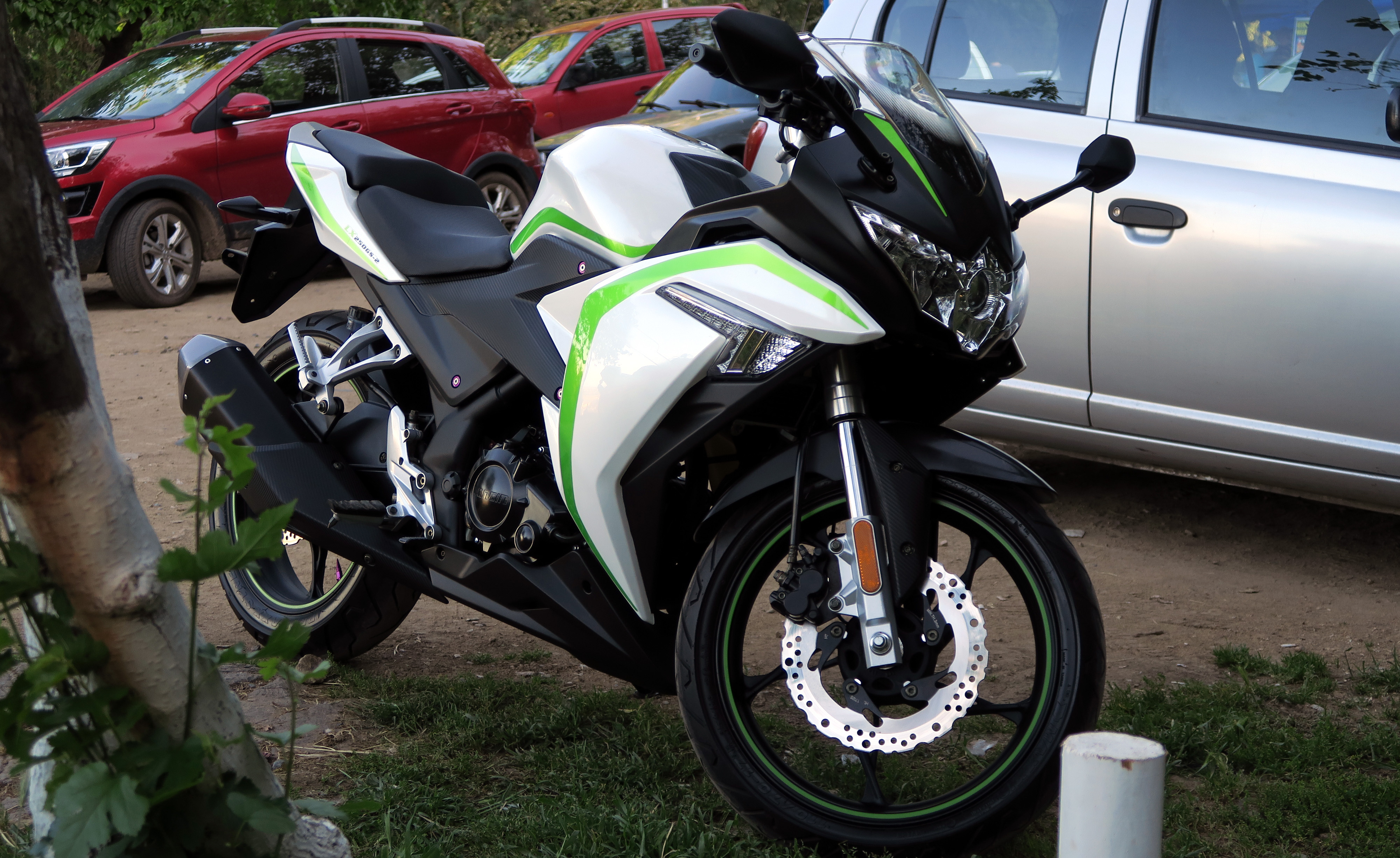
Loncin LX 250

Loncin manufactures:

- Motorcycles ranging from 50 cc to 900 cc
- All-terrain vehicles (ATVs)
- Scooter and moped engines
- Gasoline and diesel generators
- Agricultural and industrial power equipment

The company’s annual production capacity exceeds 2 million engines and 1.5 million motorcycles.

== Global presence ==
Loncin exports motorcycles and engines to over 70 countries and maintains joint ventures and subsidiaries in Europe, Southeast Asia, and South America. The company is listed on the Shanghai Stock Exchange under the ticker 603766.

== See also ==
- BMW Motorrad
- Voge (motorcycle brand)
- Motorcycle industry in China
- Loncin Holdings
