= Mercedes-Benz AIRMATIC =

Adaptive air suspension system developed by Mercedes-Benz

AIRMATIC (from AIRmatic suspension) is an adaptive air suspension system developed by Mercedes-Benz. Introduced in 1998 on the W220 S-Class, it combines air springs with electronically controlled shock absorbers to automatically adjust ride height and damping according to driving conditions. The name is derived from "air" and "automatic," highlighting the system's ability to self-regulate suspension behaviour in real time.

== Overview ==
AIRMATIC was developed by Mercedes-Benz and Continental engineers as part of Mercedes' move toward electronically managed suspension systems. The first production use appeared in the 1998 S-Class (W220) and was later extended to models such as the E-Class, CLS, GLE, and GLS.

Unlike conventional steel springs, AIRMATIC uses air-filled bellows at each wheel that can vary internal pressure to maintain a consistent ride height regardless of passenger or cargo load. The system continuously adapts to speed, surface quality, and driver input.

== Technology ==
AIRMATIC integrates the following components and functions:

- Air springs: Flexible rubber bellows replace traditional coil springs, powered by an onboard compressor.
- Adaptive damping system (ADS): Electronically controlled shock absorbers that adjust damping force within milliseconds.
- Height sensors: Monitor suspension travel at each wheel to maintain level stance.
- Air supply unit and reservoir: Compresses and stores air for instant adjustment.
- Electronic control unit (ECU): Calculates and commands ride-height and damping changes based on speed, load, and driving mode.

At low speeds, the system may raise ground clearance for rough roads, while at high speeds, it automatically lowers the vehicle to reduce drag and improve stability. Drivers can manually select comfort or sport settings via the infotainment interface.

== Evolution ==
The AIRMATIC system evolved from earlier hydropneumatic concepts used by Mercedes-Benz, eventually leading to its pairing with Active Body Control (ABC) and E-Active Body Control systems in newer generations.

- 1998 - W220 S-Class: First use of AIRMATIC with adaptive damping.
- 2002 - W211 E-Class: Broader application with more responsive air reservoirs.
- 2013 - W222 S-Class: Integration with radar and camera sensors for predictive suspension behaviour.
- 2019 - GLE (V167): Introduction of E-Active Body Control combining AIRMATIC air suspension with 48-volt active damping.

== Maintenance and reliability ==
AIRMATIC improves comfort and handling but is mechanically complex. Components such as compressors, air struts, and valve blocks are subject to wear. Ageing systems can suffer from air leaks, leading to uneven ride height or compressor failure. Regular filter and dryer maintenance helps maintain system reliability.

== Reception ==
The system has been praised for its comfort and adaptability. Reviewers note that AIRMATIC provides a "cloud-like" ride in comfort mode while preserving composure under hard braking or cornering. However, owners and independent technicians have criticised the system's cost and complexity compared with conventional steel-spring setups.

== Applications ==
AIRMATIC has been fitted to numerous Mercedes-Benz vehicles, including:

- Mercedes-Benz S-Class (W220, W221, W222)
- Mercedes-Benz E-Class (W211, W212, W213)
- Mercedes-Benz CLS-Class (C218, C257)
- Mercedes-Benz GLE-Class (W166, V167)
- Mercedes-Benz GLS-Class
- Mercedes-Benz G-Class (select models)

== See also ==
- Active Body Control
- Electronic suspension
- Air suspension
- Mercedes-Benz S-Class
