= Bessie Stringfield =

American motorcycle rider

Bessie B. Stringfield
- Born: Bessie Beatrice White; March 5, 1911; North Carolina
- Died: February 16, 1993 (aged 81); Opa-locka, Florida
- Other names: Betsy Leonora Ellis, "The Motorcycle Queen of Miami"
- Occupations: Motorcyclist, Courier, Nurse, Housekeeper

Bessie Stringfield (born Betsy Beatrice White; 1911 or 1912 – February 16, 1993), also known as the "Motorcycle Queen of Miami", was an American motorcyclist who was the first African-American woman to ride across the United States solo, and was one of the few civilian motorcycle dispatch riders for the US Army during World War II.

Credited with breaking down barriers for both women and African-American motorcyclists, Stringfield was inducted into the Motorcycle Hall of Fame. The award bestowed by the American Motorcyclist Association (AMA) for "Superior Achievement by a Female Motorcyclist" is named in her honor.

== Early life ==
Stringfield was born Betsy Beatrice White to Maggie Cherry and James White, living in Edenton, North Carolina. In later years, she created a different version of her life, saying she was born in Kingston, Jamaica, in 1911 to a black Jamaican father and a white Dutch mother, James Ferguson and Maria Ellis. Her birth date has been publicized as February 1911 with the birth name Betsy Leonora Ellis, though her death certificate says she was born in March 1911 in Kingston with parents names as James Richard White and M. Cherry; a Social Security record has her birth date as March 1912. Other public records verify she was born to Cherry and White in North Carolina.

Esther Bennett, Stringfield's niece, told The New York Times in 2018 that Stringfield had lied about her origins. Ann Ferrar, author of Stringfield's authorized biography, said she helped perpetuate some of the stories Stringfield had made up about her life because Stringfield had asked Ferrar "to tell her truth as her friend," and that Stringfield "running from her early past" did not diminish her achievements or inspirational influence on younger generations. In the popular account of Stringfield's life, her family migrated to Boston, Massachusetts, when she was still young. It is said that her parents died when Stringfield was five and she was adopted and raised by an Irish woman, though this has also been disputed by Bennett.

At the age of 16 Stringfield taught herself to ride her first motorcycle, a 1928 Indian Scout. In 1930, at the age of 19, she commenced traveling across the United States. She made seven more long-distance trips in the US on Harley-Davidson motorycles, and eventually rode through the 48 lower states, Europe, Brazil and Haiti. During this time, she earned money from performing motorcycle stunts in carnival shows. Due to her skin color, Stringfield was often denied accommodation while traveling, so she would sleep on her motorcycle at filling stations. Due to her sex, she was refused prizes in flat track races she entered.

== World War II and later life ==
During World War II Stringfield served as a civilian courier for the US Army, carrying documents between domestic army bases. She completed the rigorous training and rode her own blue 61 cubic inch Harley-Davidson. During the four years she worked for the Army, she crossed the United States eight times. She regularly encountered racism during this time, reportedly being deliberately knocked down by a white man in a pickup truck while traveling in the South.

In the 1950s Stringfield moved to Miami, Florida, where at first she was told "nigger women are not allowed to ride motorcycles" by the local police. After repeatedly being pulled over and harassed by officers, she visited the police captain. They went to a nearby park to prove her riding abilities. She gained the captain's approval to ride and did not have any more trouble with the police.

She qualified as a nurse there and founded the Iron Horse Motorcycle Club. Her skill and antics at motorcycle shows gained the attention of the local press, leading to the nickname of "The Negro Motorcycle Queen". This nickname later changed to "The Motorcycle Queen of Miami", a moniker she carried for the remainder of her life.

Stringfield died in 1993 from a heart condition. Robert Scott Thomas, whose family had employed Stringfield as a housekeeper when Thomas was a child, was named executor and beneficiary of Stringfield's estate, unaware of any relatives at the time.

== Personal life ==
She married and divorced six times, losing three babies with her first husband. She kept the last name of her third husband, Arthur Stringfield. Stringfield was Catholic.

== Legacy ==
In 1990 the American Motorcyclist Association (AMA) paid tribute to her in their inaugural "Heroes of Harley-Davidson" exhibition, as she owned 27 Harley motorcycles. In 2000 the AMA created the "Bessie Stringfield Memorial Award" to recognize outstanding achievement by a female motorcyclist. Stringfield was inducted into the Motorcycle Hall of Fame in 2002.

The Bessie Stringfield All-Female Ride was founded in 2014 to honor her legacy and promote women's participation in motorcycle riding. It ceased operations in 2021, the same year as the founding of the Bessie Belles Riding Club.

Many personal possessions of Stringfield featured in the documentary are on display at the Harley-Davidson Museum as of October 2025 in Milwaukee, Wisconsin.

=== In popular media ===
In 2017 Timeline released free and online a short video about Bessie Stringfield, "Meet Bessie Stringfield, the Black ‘Motorcycle Queen’". The 2020 HBO series Lovecraft Country features a homage to Bessie Stringfield.

A documentary, "To Myself, With Love: The Bessie Stringfield Story", directed by Diane Weis and executive produced by Sam Pollard and Gabby Revilla Lugo, made its premiere at AmDocs Film Festival in Palm Springs, California, in March 2024 and garnered The Special Jury Award. The documentary short screened at film festivals across the United States.
