= Astra RNR1 =

Group 6 sports prototype race car

- Category: Group 6
- Designer(s): Roger Nathan
- Production: 1969
- Successor: Astra RNR2

Technical specifications
- Chassis: fibreglass body on box-section triplex monocoque with front and rear subframes
- Suspension (front): double wishbones, coil springs over dampers, anti-roll bar
- Suspension (rear): Reversed lower wishbones, top links, twin trailing arms, anti-roll bar, coil springs over dampers
- Engine: Ford-Cosworth FVA/Coventry Climax 1.6–2.0 L (98–122 cu in) naturally-aspirated I4 mid-engined, longitudinally mounted
- Transmission: Hewland FT-200 5-speed manual
- Weight: 550 kg (1,210 lb)

Competition history
- Debut: 1969 1000 km of Nürburgring
Races	Wins	Podiums	Poles
49	15	27	6

The Astra RNR1 is a Group 6 sports prototype race car, designed, developed, and built by amateur British racing driver Roger Nathan, in 1969. It debuted at the 1969 1000 km of Nürburgring, where it was driven by Roger Nathan and Mike Beckwith. It competed in sports car racing between 1969 and 1976, where it found relative, but respectable success. It scored 15 race wins (including 1 additional class win), achieved 27 podium finishes, and clinched 6 pole positions. It powered by either a 2.0 L (120 cu in) Coventry Climax, or a 1.6 L (98 cu in) Ford-Cosworth FVA, naturally-aspirated four-cylinder engine.
