= Loncin Holdings =

Chinese vehicle manufacturer

- Headquarters: Chongqing, China
- Number of employees: 30,000 (2021)
- Subsidiaries: Loncin Motor Co; Capital Eagle Global Limited; Loncin International Limited
- Website: www.loncinorv.com

Loncin Holdings, Ltd. is a leading manufacturing group based in Chongqing, China, with a strong global distribution network. The company operates through multiple subsidiaries, including Loncin General Dynamics Co., Ltd., and has established a diversified brand portfolio across power equipment and mobility sectors.

Within its powersports division, Loncin develops and manufactures all-terrain vehicles (ATVs) and utility task vehicles (UTVs) under the Loncin brand.

At the same time, its motorcycle brand, Voge, represents LONCIN expansion into the high-end two-wheeler market.

Loncin uses a dual-brand strategy for its ATV, UTV, and motorcycle operations.

== Loncin Motorcycle Industry Co., Ltd ==
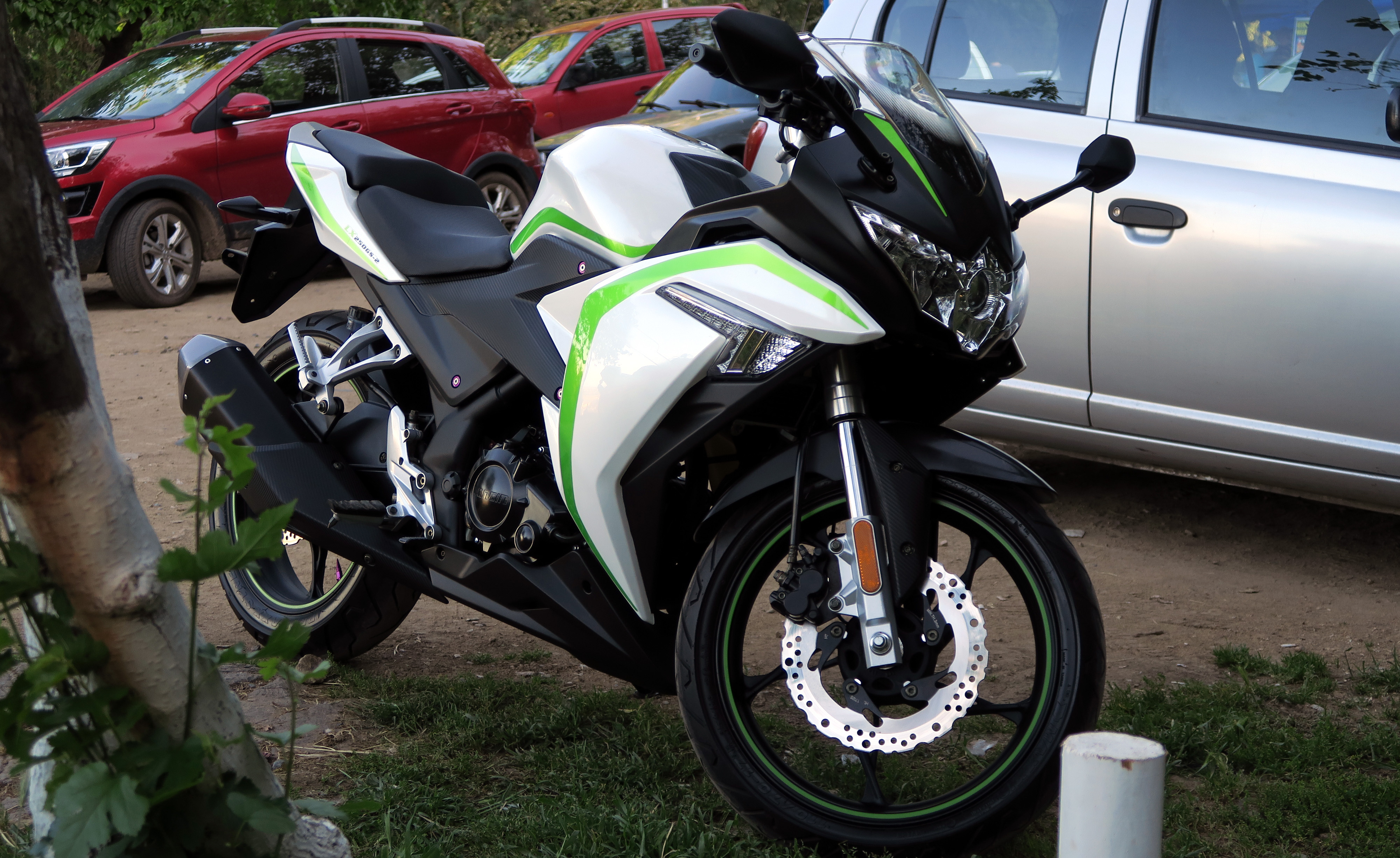
Loncin LX 250 GS-2

The Loncin Motorcycle Industry Co., Ltd subsidiary produces motorcycles; motorcycle engines; universal gasoline engine; all-terrain vehicles; and parts and components under the brand name "Loncin".

The company operates production, distribution and marketing facilities in Chongqing, Zhejiang, and Guangdong in China. It has annual production capacity of 2,500,000 motorcycles, 3,000,000 motorcycle engines, and 150,000 all-terrain vehicles (ATVs).

=== BMW Motorrad ===
In 2005, Loncin entered into an agreement to make G650GS motorcycle engines for German-based BMW Motorrad. The partnership began in 2007 and Loncin has produced motorcycle parts, engine components, and over 35,000 complete engines for BMW. Significant and technical benefits came for Loncin, in which they used the same engine to power the LX650 (also known as the CR9). This model is available only in markets specified by BMW under the agreement.

In 2017, BMW Motorrad introduced the F850GS and F750GS to succeed both the F800GS and F700GS respectively. While the outgoing models previously used Rotax 799cc engines, the F850GS and F750GS models now come equipped with slightly more powerful 853cc engines made by Loncin. Additionally, the C400X and C400GT scooters also roll off production lines at Loncin.

=== Environmental scandal ===
In 2012, Loncin was found by the United States Environmental Protection Agency to have imported 7,115 vehicles that violated the Clean Air Act, by submitting false and incomplete certification. The company was ordered to pay a US$680,000 penalty, and to support an air pollution mitigation project for the vehicles' excess emissions.
