= BMW F900R =

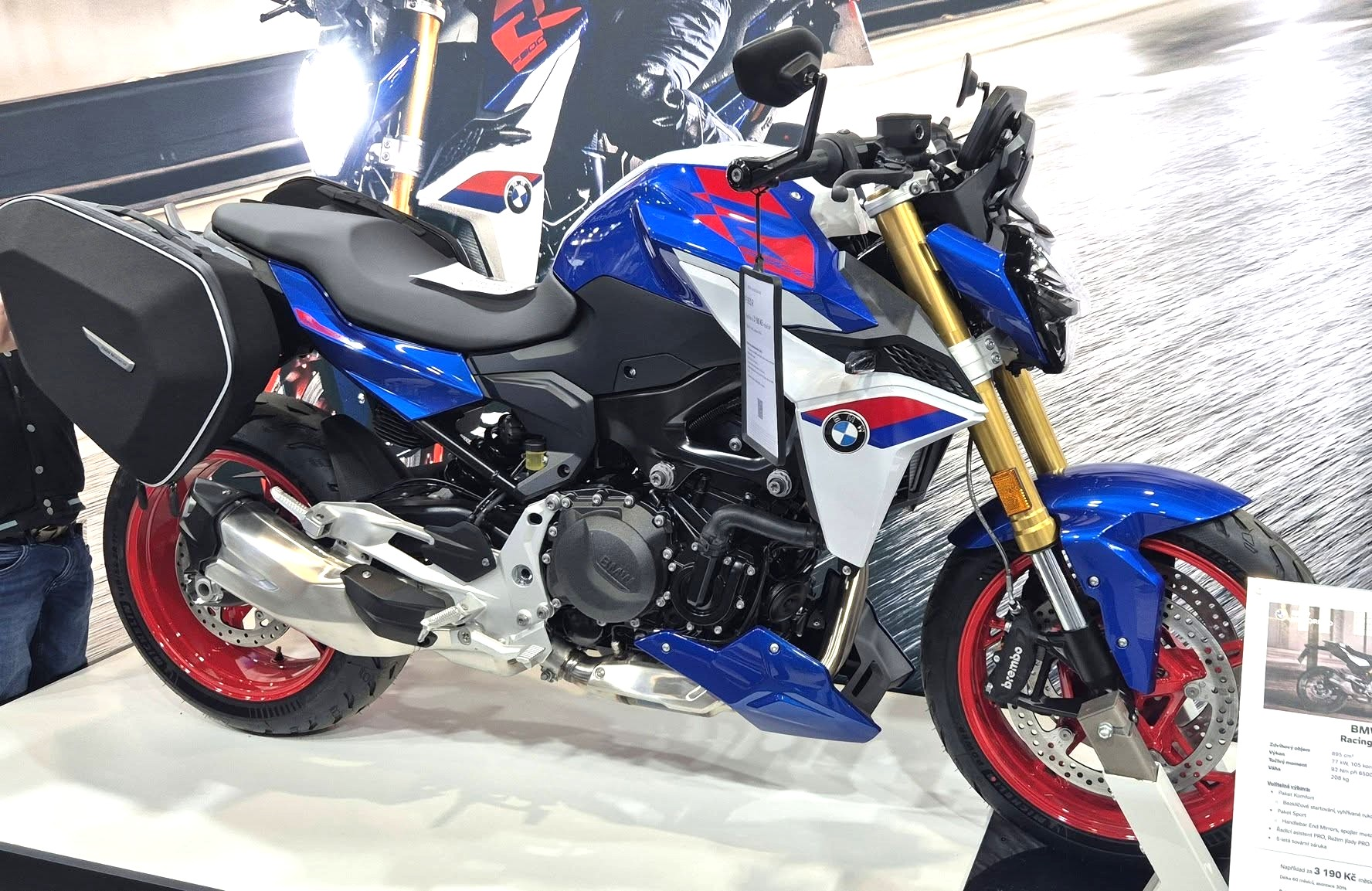
- Manufacturer: BMW Motorrad
- Production: Since 2019
- Predecessor: BMW F800R
- Class: Naked
- Engine: 895 cc (54.6 cu in), Water-cooled, 2-cylinder, 4-stroke, four valves per cylinder, two overhead camshafts, dry sump lubrication,
- Bore / stroke: 86 mm × 77 mm (3.4 in × 3.0 in)
- Transmission: 6-speed, endless O-ring chain
- Suspension: 43 mm telescopic fork (front), dual swing arm (rear)
- Brakes: Front: Twin disc, floating brake discs,
- Tires: Front:120/70-ZR17 - rear: 180/55-ZR17
- Related: F850GS, F900XR, F900GS, F900 Adventure

The BMW F900R is a naked motorcycle introduced by BMW Motorrad in 2019. The F-series 850/900 engine also includes the enduro-inspired F850GS, F900GS, and the F900XR, a Sport touring design.

It is based on the BMW F850GS series project, with which it shares technical solutions and mechanical parts, also adopted by the F900 XR.

== Description ==
Presented in November 2019 at the EICMA show in Milan, the 900R has a 895 cc (54.6 cu in) straight-twin engine with cylinders set across the frame, which delivers 105 bhp (78 kW) and is managed by a six-speed gearbox. Compared to the 850 GS engine from which it derives, it has undergone a displacement increase (from 853 cc to 895 cc) with an increase in bore and stroke to increase its power and improve its delivery. It features new forged pistons, double balancer shaft and 270° throw angle crankshaft.

Compared to the F800R, the 13 litres (2.9 imp gal; 3.4 US gal) tank has undergone a modification, being mounted in the area under the saddle above the engine, with the aim of centralizing the mass. The weight is 211 kg (465 lb) in running order.

Standard equipment includes a color TFT display with BMW Motorrad multimedia connectivity system, LED headlight, ASC, three riding modes, quickshifter, and adjustable brake and clutch levers. Optional equipment includes an adaptive headlight, fourth user-customisable riding mode, electronically controlled rear suspension from ZF, emergency call, heated grips, and tire pressure monitoring.

== BMW F900R Cup ==
The F900R Cup is a one-make UK race series introduced from 2023 with 72 riders, to provide entry level competition at an affordable price by using identical road machines slightly modified for racing on tarmac. Held over nine rounds with two heats and a final on consecutive days at each event, the races are run as a support-class during British Superbike Championship weekends.

The inaugural year's championship was won by Richard Cooper, on a machine provided by Faye Ho's FHO team. Thomas Strudwick finished a close-second. Strudwick won the 2024 championship.
