= JBW-Maserati =

Formula race car

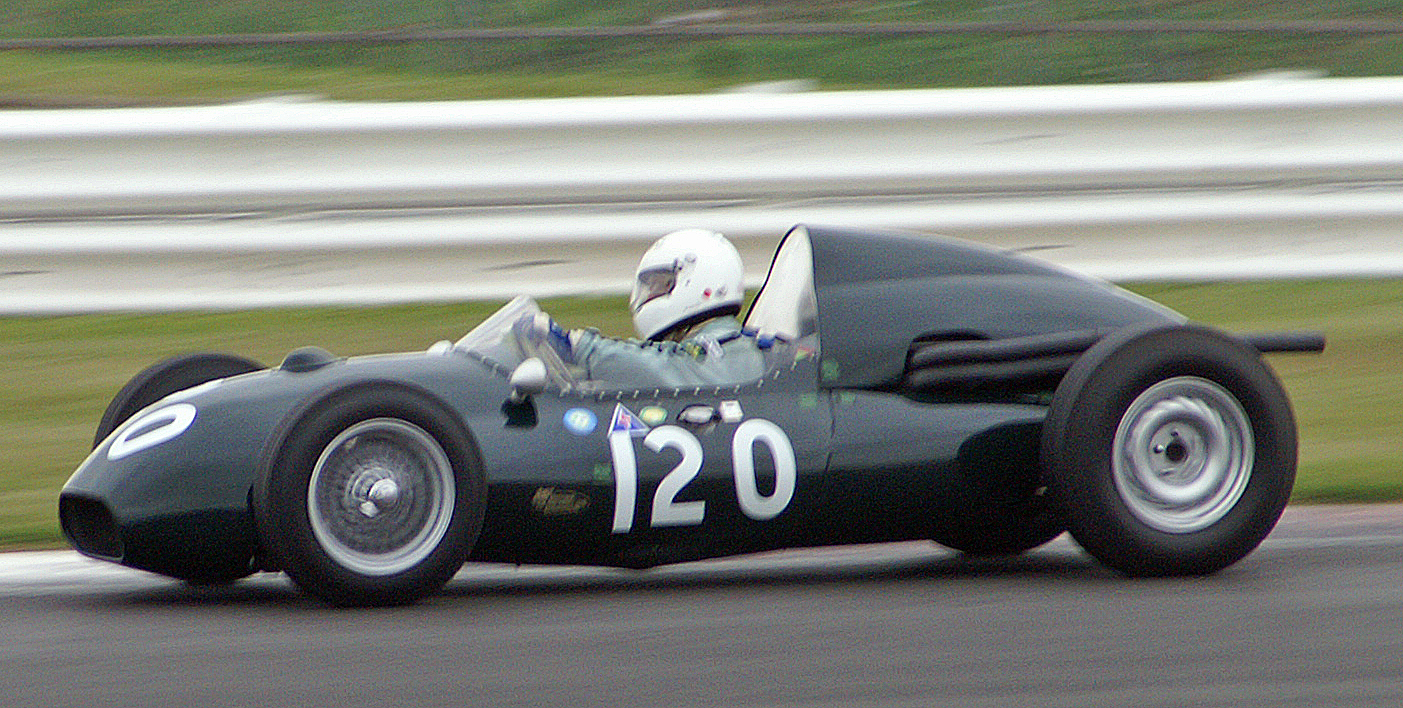
JBW Type 1-Maserati

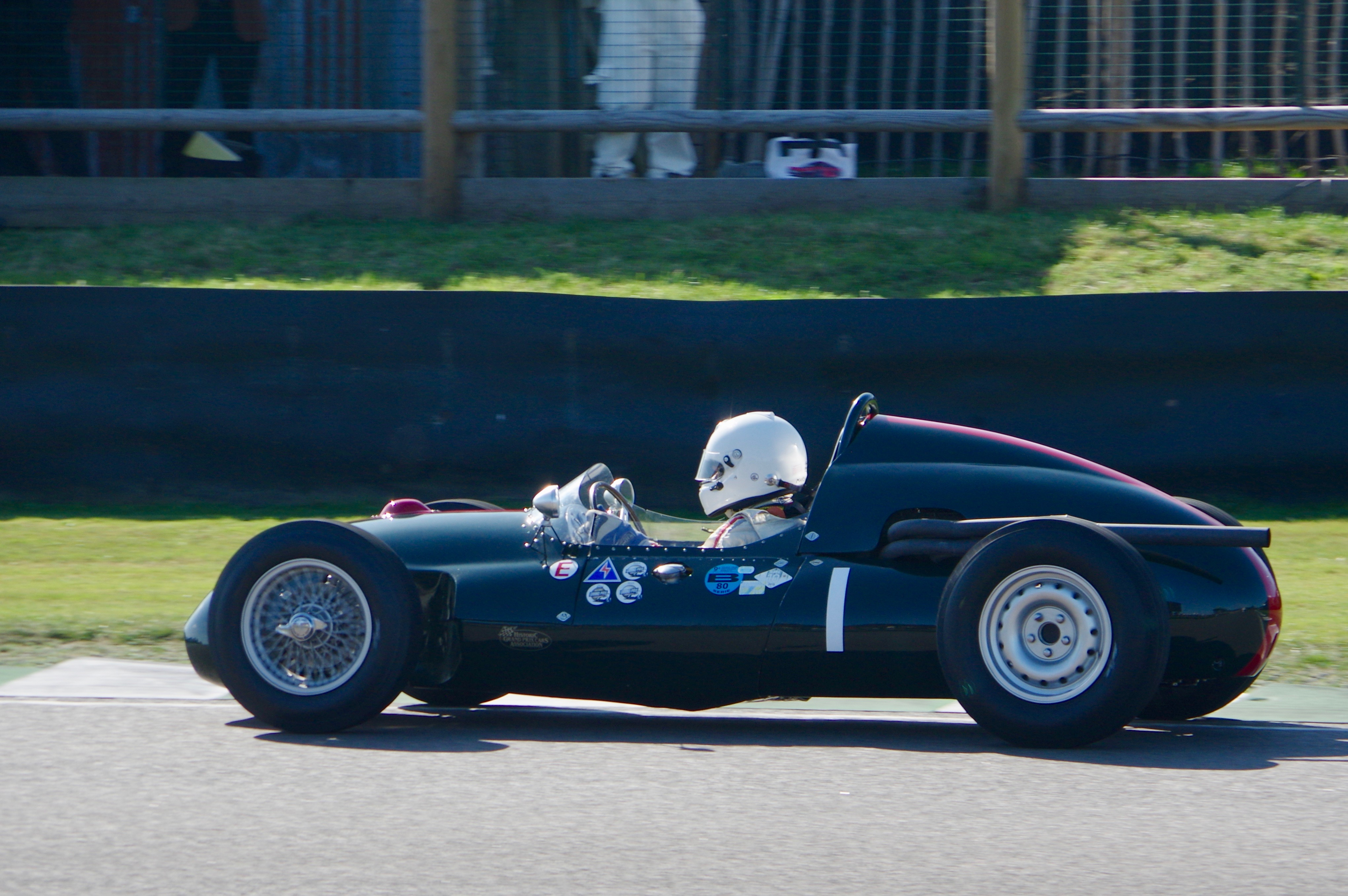
1959 JBW-Maserati in its open-wheel guise; racing on track

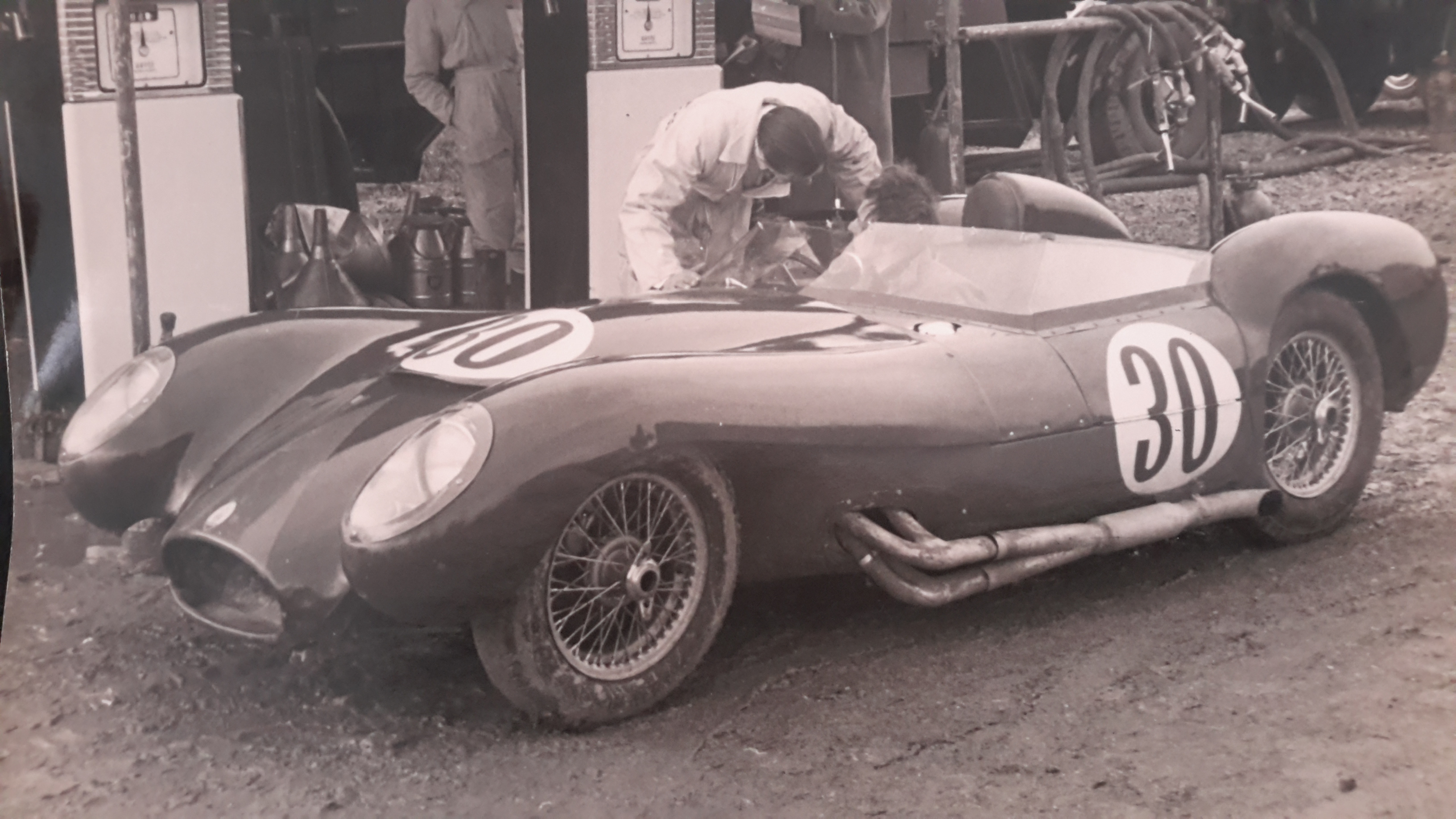
The JBW-Maserati in its closed-wheel guise

The JBW-Maserati, also known as the JBW Type 1, is a race car, designed, developed, and built by British manufacturer and constructor, JBW, in 1958. It raced in both open-wheel and closed-wheel guises. It competed in both Formula Libre events, as well as 4 Formula One World Championship Grand Prix races, between 1959 and 1961; debuting at the 1959 British Grand Prix, but scored no points over that period of time. It was initially powered by a naturally-aspirated 2.5 L (150 cu in) (but later a downscaled 1.5 L (92 cu in)) Maserati 4-cylinder engine four-cylinder engine, which droves the rear wheels through a 5-speed manual transmission. It scored no World Championship points during its time in Formula One racing.

== History ==
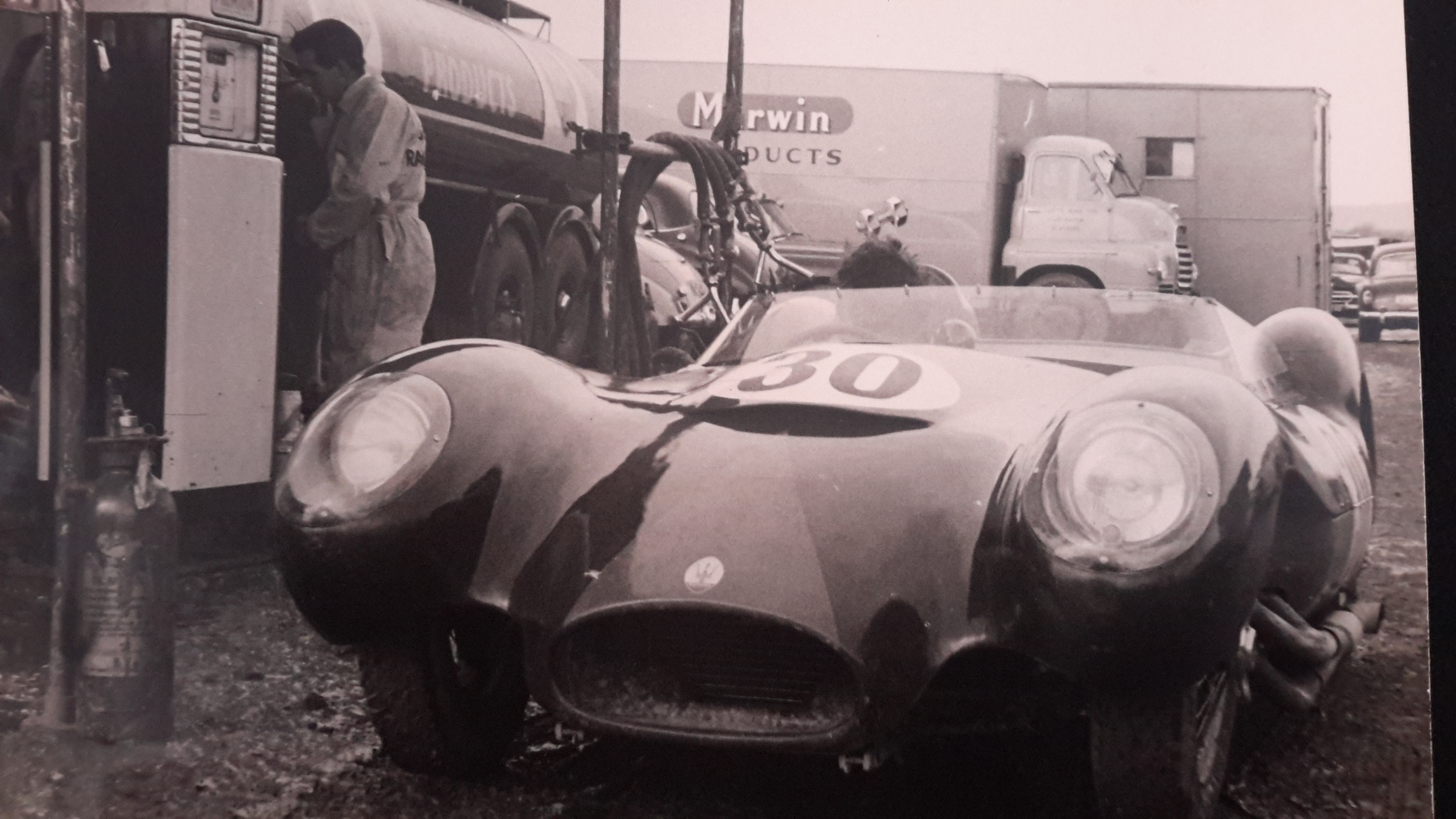
Front-view

Following two seasons competing in Formula Two races with the JBW Cooper T43 and T45, Brian Naylor decided to enter Formula One proper in 1959. To achieve this Fred Wilkinson constructed a car—the JBW Type 1—that was strongly influenced by the contemporary Cooper designs, and carried its Maserati 2.5 L (150 cu in) engine behind the driver. The first appearance of the JBW-Maserati was at the pre-season BRDC International Trophy non-Championship race at Silverstone, on 2 May 1959. Naylor arrived too late to post a qualifying time, and retired on lap 41 of the race with gearbox failure. On 18 July Naylor appeared in the JBW car at the 1959 British Grand Prix at Aintree. Although he managed to qualify ahead of such well-known drivers as Tony Brooks, Jack Fairman and Ivor Bueb, again the JBW let Naylor down and the car's transmission failed on lap 18. One final outing that year resulted in a failure even to qualify, after Naylor suffered an accident during practice for the Gold Cup race at Oulton Park on 26 September.

The JBW Type 1 did not appear again until the following year's International Trophy race, on 14 May 1960. While Naylor and the JBW-Maserati qualified in 25th and last place, by the finish he had worked his way up to 11th position, the car lasting the distance for the first time in a competitive event. Unfortunately for Naylor, the first race of the 1960 World Championship season, the 1960 Monaco Grand Prix, was not to provide such positive results and he once again failed to qualify. However, his next race, the 1960 British Grand Prix provided Brian Naylor with his best-ever Championship finish, after he came home in 13th place, having qualified in 18th place. His run of form continued at the Brands Hatch Silver City Trophy event on 1 August, where he finished 11th. Things appeared even to be looking up for the JBW team when Naylor qualified the JBW-Maserati in 7th position for the 1960 Italian Grand Prix at Monza, but his luck had begun to change and the car's gearbox failed on the 42nd lap. One further World Championship race (in the US) and two non-Championship events in the remainder of the 1960 season all resulted in early retirements.

The JBW-Maserati had further outings in the 1961 Intercontinental Formula events, but on each occasion, Naylor failed to finish. The car also ran with a 1.5-liter Maserati engine in some non-Championship events, but with no better result.
