= Electronic suspension =

Suspension system that uses electronic control for damping and preload adjustment

Electronic suspension refers to vehicle suspension systems that use electronic sensors, actuators, and control units to adjust damping and preload characteristics dynamically. Found on both motorcycles and automobiles, these systems enhance ride comfort, handling precision, and stability by adapting suspension behaviour to road conditions and rider or driver input. For motorcycles, the systems are often branded by manufacturer and include BMWs Dynamic ESA, Ducati's Skyhook and Kawasaki's KECS (Kawasaki Electronic Control Suspension).

== Overview ==
Traditional suspension systems rely on mechanical or manually adjustable dampers to control rebound and compression. Electronic suspension introduces real-time adjustability through electronically controlled valves, servomotors, and microprocessors. These systems can modify suspension stiffness or height in milliseconds to respond to changing speed, load, or terrain.

Electronic suspension technology was first applied to production motorcycles in the 1980s and 1990s, with early examples from Yamaha and Honda. Modern systems integrate data from wheel sensors, accelerometers, and inertial measurement units (IMUs) to make constant adjustments.

BMW first introduced Dynamic ESA in 2013 as an optional extra on the R1200GS evolving from the earlier ESA II electronic suspension system. It marked the company's first implementation of fully dynamic damping technology, using data from multiple sensors to adapt the machine's suspension in real-time and automatically adjusts the suspension to maintain stability and comfort. The system became a defining feature of BMW's premium touring and adventure motorcycles, and is now available on models including the BMW R1250GS, BMW R1250RT, BMW K1600GTL, and BMW S1000XR.

== Principle of operation ==
Electronic suspension systems operate using three main elements:

- Sensors - monitor parameters such as wheel speed, pitch, acceleration, and suspension travel.
- Control unit - processes sensor data and determines optimal damping or preload settings.
- Actuators - adjust hydraulic or electromagnetic valves in the suspension to modify damping force.

In motorcycles, the control logic often links with ride modes or traction control systems. In automobiles, it may interface with steering and stability control systems.

=== For Dynamic ESA ===
Dynamic ESA employs electronically controlled damping valves and position sensors integrated into the suspension components. The system gathers input from multiple sources, including wheel-travel sensors on both the front and rear suspension, an inertial measurement unit (IMU) providing pitch and roll data, and signals such as brake pressure, throttle position, and wheel speed.

A central control unit processes this information hundreds of times per second, adjusting the damping force through stepper motors and solenoid valves. This allows the suspension to continuously adapt to changes in road surface, lean angle, and rider load without the need for manual adjustment.

The core components of the system include wheel-travel sensors, IMU data, and control signals from the braking, throttle, and wheel-speed systems. Riders can select predefined damping characteristics through the motorcycle's riding mode selector, such as “Road,” “Dynamic,” or “Enduro”, while preload adjustment can also be automated based on detected load conditions.

The rider can select predefined damping characteristics through the motorcycle's riding mode selector (for example, “Road,” “Dynamic,” or “Enduro”). Preload adjustment can also be automated depending on detected load conditions.

== Types ==
=== Electronically adjustable suspension ===
BMW's original Electronic Suspension Adjustment (ESA) appeared in 2004 and allowed riders to change spring preload and rebound damping electronically. ESA II, introduced in 2008, improved precision and range of adjustment but remained passive. The settings only changed when the motorcycle was stationary.

Honda’s HMAS allowed the rider to choose preset damping or preload settings via handlebar switches. The suspension remained mechanically passive but could be electronically tuned.

=== Semi-active suspension ===
BMW’s 2013 version called Dynamic ESA, developed by BMW Motorrad, added real-time adaptive control, adjusting damping continuously as conditions changed. This system was initially co-developed with ZF Sachs and marked BMW's transition to semi-active suspension technology. Semi-active systems, including Ducati’s Skyhook, adjust damping continuously in real time based on feedback from sensors. These systems maintain mechanical springs but control hydraulic flow through solenoid valves.

Introduced in 2017, the updated version of Dynamic ESA incorporated automatic load detection and a self-levelling function. On touring models such as the BMW K1600GTL, the system automatically adjusts ride height for consistent geometry under varying loads.

=== Fully active suspension ===
Fully active suspension can generate vertical movement independently of road input using hydraulic or electromagnetic actuators. Although common in high-performance automobiles (e.g., Lexus LC, Mercedes-Benz Active Body Control), such systems are rare in motorcycles due to packaging and power constraints.

== Applications ==
=== Motorcycles ===
Electronic suspension is widely used on premium and performance motorcycles, including:

- BMW R1200GS / BMW R1250GS, BMW R1250RT, BMW S1000XR, BMW K1600GT and BMW K1600GTL, BMW R nineT models (as optional equipment) with Dynamic ESA
- Ducati Multistrada models with Skyhook Suspension EVO
- Kawasaki Versys 1000 SE with KECS (Kawasaki Electronic Control Suspension)
- Yamaha FJR1300 and Yamaha Tracer 9 GT with electronically adjustable suspension

The systems typically allow riders to switch between "Comfort," "Sport," or "Dynamic" modes and automatically adjust preload for passenger or luggage loads.

=== Automobiles ===
In cars, electronic suspension is used for ride comfort and handling optimization. Examples include:

- Audi Magnetic Ride using magnetorheological fluid dampers
- Mercedes-Benz AIRMATIC and Active Body Control
- Tesla Model S adaptive air suspension

== Advantages ==
- Improved comfort and handling balance
- Reduced brake dive and squat under acceleration
- Automatic compensation for varying load and road conditions
- Enhanced stability during cornering and braking

Reviewers praised Dynamic ESA for its smooth transition between comfort and performance modes, reducing the need for manual suspension tuning. It has been credited with improving long-distance comfort and high-speed stability on varying surfaces. Motorcycle journalists have described it as one of the most significant advances in suspension technology since the introduction of fully adjustable dampers.

== Limitations ==
- Higher cost and complexity compared to mechanical systems
- Increased maintenance requirements due to sensors and actuators
- Dependence on electronic control units and calibration

== Future development ==
Advancements in sensor fusion and artificial intelligence are leading to predictive suspension systems capable of reading the road ahead using radar or camera inputs. These technologies are being tested in both automotive and motorcycle applications, aiming for fully adaptive systems that anticipate terrain changes.

== See also ==
- Semi-active suspension
- Motorcycle safety technology
- Anti-lock braking system
- Vehicle dynamics
- Inertial measurement unit
- Dynamic Traction Control
- ABS Pro
- BMW Motorrad
