= BMW K1600 =

BMW K1600GT, K1600GTL, K1600B, K1600 Grand America
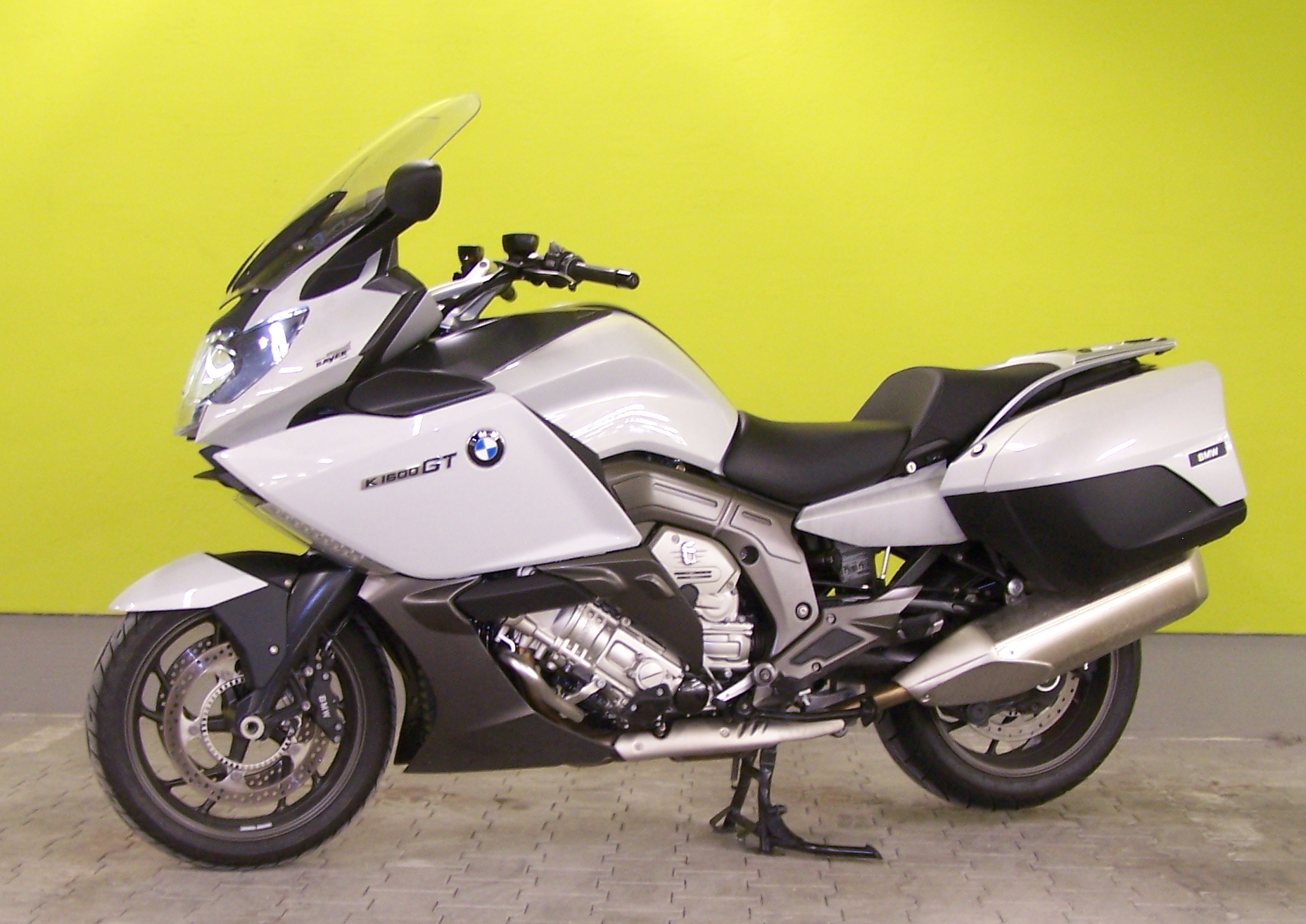
- BMW K1600GT
- Manufacturer: BMW Motorrad
- Production: March 2011
- Predecessor: BMW K1300GT
- Class: K1600GT: sport touring; K1600GTL: tourer; K1600B: bagger; K1600 Grand America: luxury tourer
- Engine: 1649 cc straight-six transverse-mounted
- Bore / stroke: 72 mm × 67.5 mm (2.83 in × 2.66 in)
- Compression ratio: 12.2:1
- Top speed: 164 mph / 263kmh
- Power: 118 kW (160 hp) 7,750 rpm
- Torque: 175–180.32 N⋅m (129.07–133.00 lbf⋅ft) (claimed)@ 5,250 rpm
- Transmission: 6-speed sequential manual, constant-mesh, shaft-drive
- Weight: 296 kilograms (652 lb) (dry); 319 kg (703 lb) (GT model, 90% full fuel tank, no panniers) (wet)
- Fuel capacity: 7 US gallons (26 L; 5.8 imp gal)

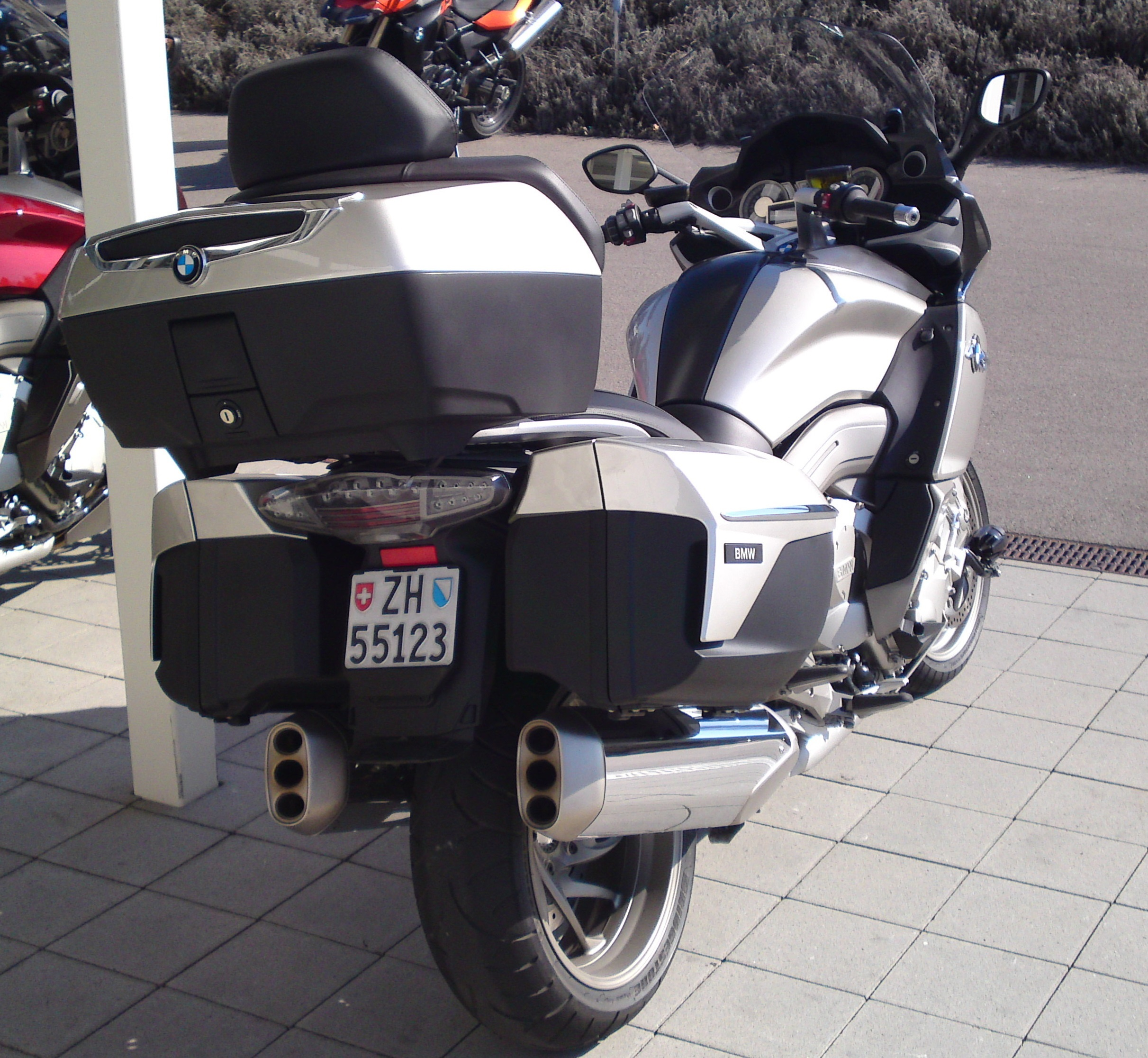
Rear view of a K1600GTL

The BMW K1600GT, K1600GTL, K1600 Grand America and K1600B are Touring motorcycles manufactured by BMW Motorrad. The former two were announced in July 2010, unveiled at the Intermot motorcycle show in Cologne in October 2010; they went on sale in March 2011. The latter was announced in October 2016. The K1600GTL is a full dress luxury tourer, which replaced the K1200LT. It was intended to compete with the Honda Gold Wing. The K1600GT was more of a sport tourer similar to the then-existing K1300GT and previous K1200GT models. (Note: The K1600GTL is also listed as a sport-touring motorcycle e.g. on Motorcyclist's "Fastest Production Motorcycles".) The K1600B is a bagger designed primarily for the North American market. The K1600 Grand America is another fully dressed tourer which is primarily marketed in North America which was launched in 2018.

== Technology ==
The bikes feature a new 1649 cc straight-six engine which is mounted transversely across chassis. The cylinders are angled forward by 55°. The engine was originally used on the Concept 6, a concept bike that was shown at the 2009 EICMA Milan Motor Show. BMW claims that the engine, which at 560 mm (22 in) wide is just 67 mm (2.6 in) wider than the K1300 engine, is the narrowest in-line six-cylinder engine ever produced. Cylinder bore is 72.0 mm (2.83 in) and the distance between cylinder centres 77 mm (3.0 in). The camshafts are hollow, with cam lobes pressed on, which saves around 2 lb (0.91 kg). The engine has electronic throttle control and multiple drive modes which can be set according to road conditions.

New technology for BMW on these models include adaptive headlights. As standard the headlights shine onto a mirror which keeps the beam level according to how the bike is pitched. The optional adaptive headlights include a servomotor that directs the headlight beam according to how the bike is leaning in a turn, effectively pointing the beam around the bend.

To save weight, the motorcycle has a unique cast magnesium alloy subframe to which the front fairing is secured.

=== 2022 model year redesign ===
The K1600 was redesigned for the 2022 model year to include an all-digital instrument cluster with 10.25-inch (260 mm) color display. Navigation is integrated with the same display.

== Reception ==
In July 2011, US magazine Cycle World named the K1600GT as its best sport touring motorcycle, and the K1600GTL as the best touring motorcycle for 2011. Motorcyclist named the K1600GT as Best Touring Bike in its 2011 Motorcycle of the Year awards. UK weekly newspaper Motor Cycle News named the K1600GT as Best Tourer at its MCN Awards 2011.

Motorcyclist road tested the K1600GTL against the Honda Gold Wing and preferred the Honda. They did note that the additions on the K1600GTL over the K1600GT worked against it, and concluded that the latter was the better bike.

=== Records ===
Carl Reese set a record US California-New York time on a K1600, in 2015. In 2017, the same rider set a 24-hour riding distance record of over 2,100 miles (3,400 km) on a K1600, on a closed course in Texas.

== See also ==
- List of motorcycles by type of engine
