= ABS Pro =

Motorcycle cornering anti-lock braking system developed by BMW Motorrad

Motorcycle technology
- Manufacturer: BMW Motorrad
- Type: Anti-lock braking system
- Introduced: 2014
- Purpose: Cornering brake stability

ABS Pro is an advanced motorcycle anti-lock braking system (ABS) developed by BMW Motorrad. It extends the capabilities of conventional ABS by maintaining braking stability while the motorcycle is leaned over in a corner. The system continuously adjusts brake pressure based on lean angle and traction data, enhancing control and reducing the likelihood of wheel lock or loss of grip.

== Overview ==
BMW Motorrad introduced ABS Pro in 2014 as part of its continuing investment in electronic rider aids. It first appeared as an upgrade for the BMW HP4 supersport motorcycle and later became available across multiple models in the BMW range.

ABS Pro differs from standard ABS by factoring in real-time data from an inertial measurement unit (IMU), which measures lean angle, pitch, and yaw. The system modulates braking pressure individually for each wheel, depending on the bike's position and grip level, allowing for smoother and safer deceleration, even during cornering.

== Technology ==
ABS Pro integrates the following components:

- Dual wheel-speed sensors to detect slippage
- A six-axis IMU to measure lean and acceleration
- An electronic brake-pressure controller linked to the motorcycle's traction and suspension systems
- Coordination with Dynamic Traction Control (DTC) and Dynamic ESA systems

When a rider applies the brake mid-corner, the system automatically reduces the initial pressure gradient to prevent abrupt load transfer and wheel lock. This allows the motorcycle to maintain its line through a bend instead of "standing up" as occurs with traditional ABS systems.

== Applications ==
After debuting on the HP4, ABS Pro became available as standard or optional equipment on several BMW models, including:

- BMW S1000RR and BMW S1000XR
- BMW R1200GS and BMW R1250GS
- BMW K1600GT and BMW K1600GTL
- BMW R nineT (from 2016 as a retrofit option)

Most BMW motorcycles equipped with a six-axis IMU now include ABS Pro as part of their rider-assist packages.

== Development ==
BMW Motorrad pioneered motorcycle ABS in 1988 and has since refined the technology through multiple generations. ABS Pro was developed in collaboration with Bosch and evolved from the company's Motorcycle Stability Control (MSC) platform, adding cornering capability through lean-sensitive modulation.

== Reception ==
The introduction of ABS Pro was widely regarded as a significant advancement in motorcycle safety. Riders and reviewers noted its effectiveness in improving braking stability during cornering and on uneven or slippery surfaces.

== See also ==
- Anti-lock braking system
- Motorcycle safety technology
- Motorcycle Stability Control
- Dynamic Traction Control
- BMW Motorrad
