= ASAP =

ASAP commonly refers to "as soon as possible".

ASAP or asap may also refer to:

== Arts and media ==
=== Music ===
==== Performers ====
- ASAP (band), a hard rock band fronted by Adrian Smith
- ASAP Mob, a recording group from Harlem, New York
  - ASAP Ferg (born 1988), American hip hop recording artist from Harlem, New York
  - ASAP Rocky (born 1988), rapper from Harlem, New York

==== Recordings ====
- "ASAP" (Bardot song), 2001
- "ASAP" (Shallipopi song), 2024
- "ASAP" (STAYC song), 2021
- "ASAP" (T.I. song), 2005
- "A.S.A.P." (Little Kiss song), 1997
- "A.S.A.P." (Mya song), 2026
- "ASAP", a song from the Lena Meyer-Landrut album Stardust, 2012
- "ASAP", a song by Mirror, 2018
- "A.S.A.P.", a song by Hikaru Utada, 2002
- "A.S.A.P.", a song from the Two Steps from Hell album Legend, 2008
- "Get Back (ASAP)", a song by Alexandra Stan, 2011
- "ASAP", a song from the NewJeans EP Get Up, 2023

=== Other media ===
- ASAP (TV program), a Philippine television variety show (All-Star Sunday Awesome Party) which has aired on ABS-CBN since 1995
- Asap (web portal), an Associated Press multimedia news portal

== Businesses and organizations ==
- Academics Stand Against Poverty, an international anti-poverty organization
- Aircraft Sales and Parts, an American kit aircraft and parts manufacturer
- Applied Security Analysis Program, an investment education program at the University of Wisconsin–Madison School of Business
- Aerospace Safety Advisory Panel, an independent NASA safety panel
- ASAP, Inc., a southern U.S.-based food delivery company
- Asociación Salvadoreña de Productores de Fonogramas y Afines, a Salvadoran non-profit organization

== Government ==
- Act in Support of Ammunition Production, an EU subsidy programme
- Automated Standard Application for Payments, a payment system operated by the U.S. Treasury Department for financial assistance agreements.

== Science and technology ==
- AcceleratedSAP software, from SAP AG
- Another Slight Atari Player, an open-source player of Atari SAP music format
- Asynchronous array of simple processors, AsAP processor architecture
- Atypical small acinar proliferation, a diagnosis on prostate biopsy that carries an increased risk of finding prostate cancer on re-biopsy
- Sodium polyacrylate

== See also ==
- STAT
