= Information Technology and Innovation Foundation =

American nonprofit think tank

- Abbreviation: ITIF
- Formation: March 2006; 20 years ago
- Type: Public Policy Think Tank
- Location: Washington, D.C., U.S.
- Co-Chairs: Vic Fazio, Philip English
- President: Robert D. Atkinson
- Revenue: $3,421,064 (2015)
- Expenses: $3,337,382 (2015)
- Website: itif.org

The Information Technology and Innovation Foundation (ITIF) is a U.S. nonprofit public policy think tank based in Washington, D.C., focused on public policy surrounding industry and technology. As of 2019, the University of Pennsylvania ranks ITIF as the most authoritative science and technology policy think tank in the world. In its role in developing industrial and technological policies, ITIF has attracted controversy for its affiliations with various technology companies.

== Mission ==
ITIF's stated mission is to promote new ways of thinking about technology-driven productivity, competitiveness and globalization. The newspaper Roll Call described ITIF as trying to "navigate the ideological waters to promote government support for innovation in many forms and with a broad range of ideals." Ars Technica has described ITIF as "one of the leading, and most prolific, tech policy think tanks."

ITIF has called for the United States government to implement a national manufacturing strategy to combat job losses and the trade deficit which they attribute to declining international competitiveness. They have argued that the U.S. government's gross domestic product (GDP) statistics suffer from statistical bias and thus overstate U.S. manufacturing output and productivity growth. They have also criticized the Chinese government for behaviors they label "innovation mercantilism" including standards manipulation and intellectual property theft.

In Internet policy, ITIF supported both the PROTECT IP Act (PIPA) and the Stop Online Piracy Act (SOPA) in the U.S. Congress. They oppose applying Title II telephone regulations to broadband, arguing that it would stifle Internet innovation, and instead support net neutrality legislation. ITIF has praised both the U.S. and the European Union "open Internet" rulings. For similar reasons, they have supported legislation aimed at curtailing Internet piracy, stirring some controversy when they argued that data caps on Internet usage would be an effective anti-piracy tool.

Along with the Breakthrough Institute, ITIF has called for increased public funding for clean energy innovation, arguing that the United States is falling behind countries like China, Japan and South Korea.

== Publications ==
In economic policy, ITIF publishes the State New Economy Index, which measures how much U.S. states’ economies are driven by knowledge and innovation. They publish The Atlantic Century, which ranks countries on their competitiveness and innovative capacity. ITIF took over publishing the "B-index", which measures the strength of countries' R&D tax incentive systems, from the Organisation for Economic Co-operation and Development (OECD) in 2012.

In the life sciences field, ITIF published Leadership in Decline: Assessing U.S. International Competitiveness in Biomedical Research in 2012, which director of the National Institutes of Health and leader of the Human Genome Project Francis S. Collins deemed the "one book" he would require President Barack Obama to read in his second term in office.

ITIF has published several reports advocating greater deployment of information technologies, including Digital Prosperity and Digital Quality of Life. In Digital Prosperity, ITIF found that IT investment delivered three to five times the productivity growth of other types of investments. Commenting on the study, former Dean of Wisconsin School of Business Michael Knetter agreed with the productivity figures, though expressed caution given that some of ITIF's contributors are in the technology industry. ITIF's report Steal These Policies: Strategies for Reducing Digital Piracy provided the foundation for the controversial PROTECT IP and Stop Online Piracy Acts in the U.S. Congress, which the think tank acknowledged were at odds with the positions of many of its supporters.

In 2013, the think tank published a widely cited report which found that the U.S. National Security Agency's PRISM electronic data surveillance program could cost the U.S. economy between $21.5 and $35 billion in lost cloud computing business over three years.

ITIF previously issued an annual Luddite Award for the "Year’s Worst Innovation Killers".

== Leadership ==
Referred to as "scrupulously nonpartisan", the think tank was established in 2006 with two former U.S. Representatives, Republican Jennifer Dunn and Democrat Calvin Dooley, as co-chairs. Republican Philip English and Democrat Vic Fazio, former U.S. Representatives, co-chair ITIF. Senators Chris Coons and Todd Young and Representatives Suzan DelBene and Susan W. Brooks serve as honorary co-chairs. Robert D. Atkinson, former vice-president at the Progressive Policy Institute, is president of ITIF. While leading ITIF, he has authored two books: Innovation Economics: The Race for Global Advantage (Yale University Press, 2012), and Big is Beautiful: Debunking the Myth of Small Business (MIT Press, 2018).

=== Board Members ===
As of 2019, the website of the Information Technology and Innovation Foundation listed 22 board members.

==== Honorary Co-Chairs ====
- Darrell Issa, Representative (R-CA)
- Chris Coons, Senator (D-DE)
- Suzan DelBene, Representative (D-WA)
- Todd Young, Senator (R-IN)

==== Board Chairs ====
- Phil English, Senior Government Relations Advisor at Arent Fox
- Vic Fazio, Senior Advisor of Akin Gump Strauss Hauer & Feld

==== Board Members ====
- Grant D. Aldonas, Principal Managing Director of Split Rock International
- Bill Andresen, Associate Vice President for Federal Affairs at the University of Pennsylvania
- Robert D. Atkinson, President of the Information Technology and Innovation Foundation
- Donald A. Baer, Worldwide Chair and CEO of Burson-Marsteller
- William B. Bonvillian, Former Director of the MIT Washington Office
- Christopher G. Caine, President and Founder of Mercator XXI
- Jeffrey Eisenach, Senior Vice President at NERA Economic Consulting
- Tom Galvin, Executive Director of Digital Citizens Alliance
- David Goldston, Director, Government Affairs Program for the Natural Resources Defense Council
- Shane Green, President and CEO of Personal, Inc.
- David A. Gross, Partner at Wiley Rein LLP
- Cynthia Hogan, Vice President for Public Policy for the Americas at Apple Inc.
- Frederick S. Humphries Jr., Corporate Vice President of U.S. Government Affairs for Microsoft
- Shannon Kellogg, Director of Public Policy at Amazon
- Blair Levin, Nonresident Senior Fellow, Metropolitan Policy Program at the Brookings Institution
- Jason Mahler, Vice President of Government Affairs for Oracle Corporation
- Lisa Malloy, Director of Government Relations and Trade Policy for Intel
- Bernard F. McKay, Chief Public Policy Officer and Vice President for Global Corporate Affairs of Intuit
- Jason Oxman, President and CEO of the Information Technology Industry Council
- Dorothy Robyn, Senior Fellow of Boston University at the Institute for Sustainable Energy
- Nate Tibbits, Senior Vice President of Government Affairs for Qualcomm
- John Tuccillo, Senior Vice President of Global Industry and Government Affairs of Schneider Electric

== Funders ==
ITIF contributors have included the Alfred P. Sloan Foundation, the Atlantic Philanthropies, Cisco, Communications Workers of America, eBay, the Ewing Marion Kauffman Foundation, Google, IBM, the Information Technology Industry Council, the Nathan Cummings Foundation, and Bernard L. Schwartz. ITIF's research has also been funded by U.S. government agencies such as the National Institute of Standards and Technology (NIST) and the United States Agency for International Development (USAID). In 2010, ITIF received funding from the U.S. Election Assistance Commission to study means for improving voting accessibility for U.S. military service members who have sustained disabling injuries in combat.

== See also ==
- Battelle Memorial Institute
- Progressive Policy Institute
- RAND Corporation
- List of think tanks in the United States
