= Carl Reese (driver) =

American motorcycle racer

Carl J. Reese
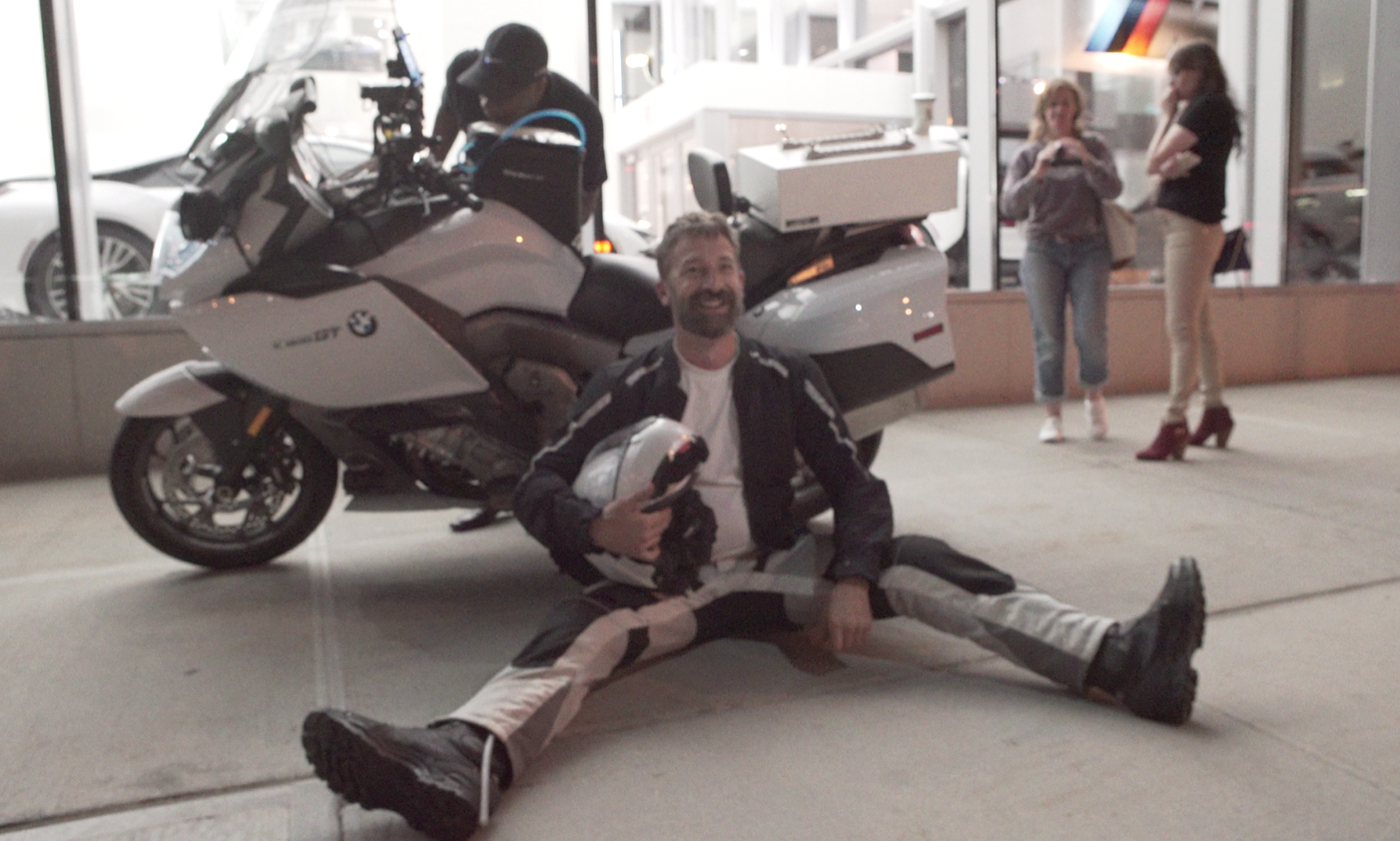
- Reese at a BMW dealer in Manhattan
- Born: Grove City, Pennsylvania, U.S.
- Awards: Guinness World Record

Carl J. Reese is a multiple Guinness World Record-holding endurance driver and motorcyclist.

== Achievements ==
=== Guinness World Record: Shortest Charging Time in an Electric Vehicle ===
From 16 to 19 April 2015, Rodney Hawk, Deena Mastracci, and Reese drove from Los Angeles to New York City in a Tesla Model S P85D. The non-driving time was 12 hours, 48 minutes, and 19 seconds.

=== Fastest time from Los Angeles to New York City in an electric vehicle ===
The April 16–19, 2015 trip also set the record for the fastest time from Los Angeles to New York City in an electric vehicle. The total trip time was 58 hours and 55 minutes. The trip was supported by Anthony Alvarado, Johnnie Oberg, and Matt Nordenstrom.

=== Transcontinental autonomous record ===
From October 18–21, 2015, Deena Mastracci, Reese, and Alex Roy set the first record for the shortest LA-NYC trip with a semi-autonomous car. The trio drove from Redondo Beach, CA in route to Red Ball Garage in Manhattan in 57 hours and 48 minutes. The drivers used the autopilot function of the Tesla Model S P85D for 96.1% of the 2995-mile journey.

=== Double transcontinental electric vehicle record ===
On October 22, 2015, after fewer than 28 hours in New York City after the record-breaking autonomous run, Deena Mastracci and Reese drove the Tesla P85D back to the Portofino Hotel in Redondo Beach, California. A notary stood by to officially log the couple in; a staff member of the Portofino was witness.

The couple set the double transcontinental record for an electric vehicle (round trip LA-NYC-LA) with a time of 6 days, 6 hours, and 22 minutes; this beat the previous record set by Dan Edmunds and Kurt Niebuhrs, which was 6 days, 23 hours, and 4 minutes.

=== Solo motorcycle "Cannonball" record from Los Angeles to New York City ===
Reese held the record for fastest solo motorcycle from Los Angeles to New York City with a time of 38 hours and 49 minutes. He departed from Winnetka, CA on 28 August 2015 at 3:15 am and arrived in New York City the next day at 9:04 pm. Reese insisted on notaries at both the start and finish lines who verified his identification, engine number, odometer reading, and VIN. The motorcycle used was also tracked by third-party GPS tracking. His record was later beaten by Adam Frasca on April 10, 2019, with an east to west record time of 37 hours 7 minutes and again two weeks later by Calvin Cote with a west to east record time of 35 hours 6 minutes on April 21, 2019.

=== Guinness World Record: Greatest Distance in 24 hours on a Motorcycle (solo) ===
On February 26, 2017, Reese broke the Guinness Book of World Record for Greatest Distance in 24 hours on a Motorcycle (individual) on a track. Riding a BMW K1600, Reese partnered with Continental AG to use the 8.5 mile closed track to set his latest world record. Continental Tire Proving Grounds are located in Uvalde, Texas. Reese totaled 2116.5 miles in less than a 24-hour period. Breaking the existing Guinness record of 2023.5 miles held by Matthew McKelvey in 2014.

== Philanthropy ==
=== Motorcycle Relief Project ===
Reese and Deena Mastracci have set multiple world records to bring attention to Motorcycle Relief Project, a US-based charity that helps combat veterans with PTSD.

=== Coalition of Hope ===
On 3 September 2016, Reese rode Mount Chimborazo in Ecuador to bring awareness to the April 2016 earthquake. Reese rode to bring attention to the "Ecuador Earthquake Relief" project by Coalition of Hope, a US-based charity, and The Ride of My Life YouTube production company.

== See also ==
- List of long-distance motorcycle riders
