= Bonvillian =

Bonvillian is a surname. Notable people with the surname include:

- John Bonvillian (1948–2018), American psychologist
- William Boone Bonvillian (fl. 1969–), American university lecturer
