= Alex Roy =

American racing driver

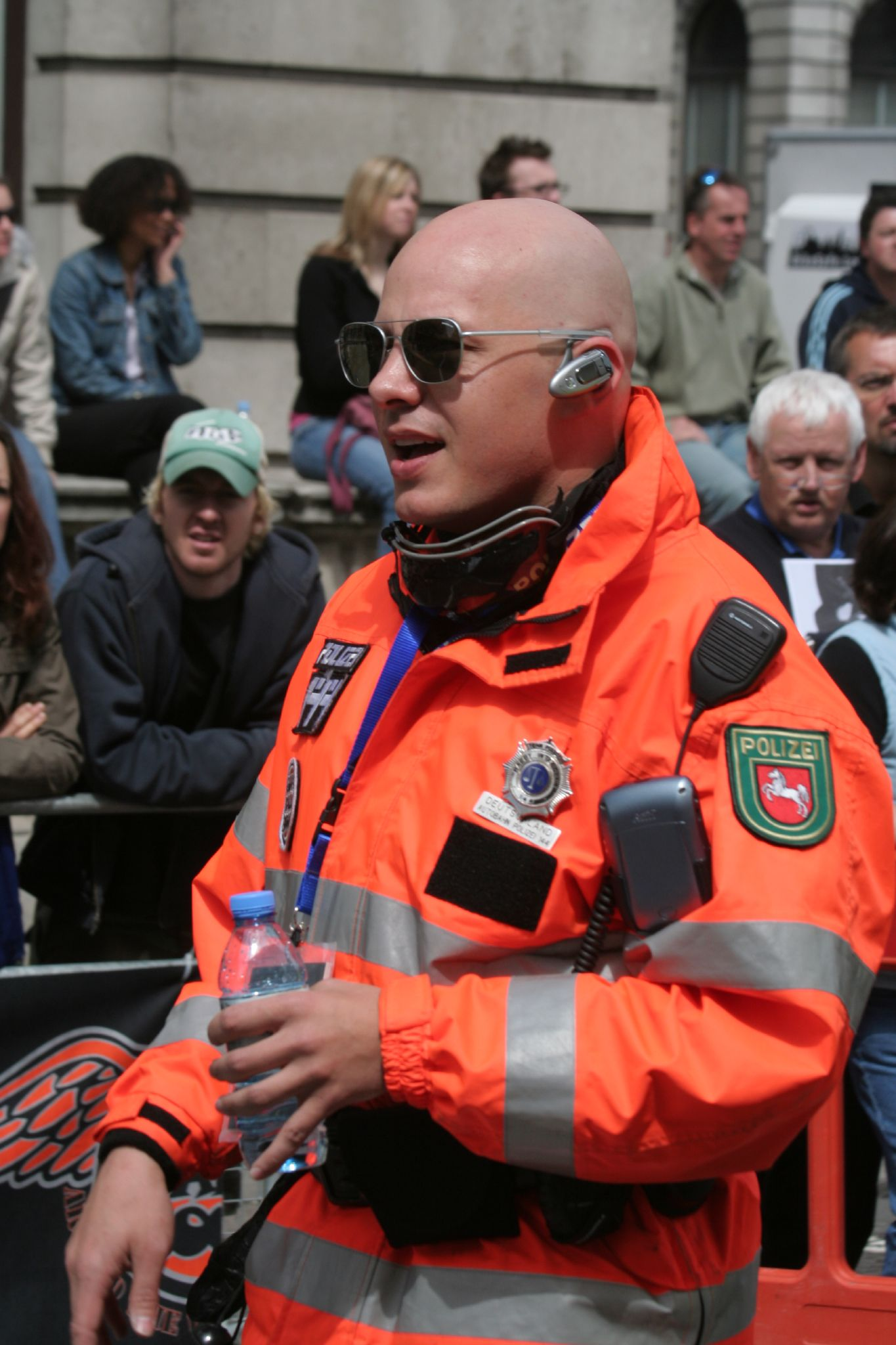
- Roy at the start of the 2006 Gumball 3000
- Born: November 23, 1971 (age 54); Los Angeles, California, U.S.
- Employer(s): Argo AI, The Drive, NBC Sports, Noho Sound, Autonocast
- Known for: Rally racing, transcontinental driving record, Cannonball Run, autonomous vehicles, The Moth
- Height: 6'

Alexander Roy (born November 23, 1971) is an American writer, podcaster, TV host and rally race driver who has set various endurance driving records, including the US "Cannonball Run" transcontinental driving record, which he and Dave Maher broke in 2006 in 31 hours and 4 minutes, featured in the 2019 documentary APEX: The Secret Race Across America.

On April 1, 2015, Roy announced that he had completed the transcontinental driving record across the United States in 26 hours, 28 minutes. He subsequently revealed it to be an April Fools prank intended to highlight the lack of fact checking in online media.

== Driving career ==
Roy distinguished himself on the Gumball 3000 and Bullrun rallies with a modified BMW M5, and later a Bentley Continental GT comically decorated as Canadian, German, Spanish, Swedish, Italian and Bahamanian police cars (complete with lights, sirens, and an inflatable sex doll) for Team Polizei 144. He won the Gumball's 2003 Spirit trophy for his car, eccentric costumes, and mock French or German interview replies. In 2004, he and his co-driver wore costumes based on the Disney science fiction film Tron, winning the Style trophy.

Roy meticulously prepares for rallies with the goal of avoiding police stops, using maps, GPS navigation, and spreadsheets. During the 2004 rally, he impersonated a police officer, with vehicle mounted flashing lamps used to perform illegal traffic stops against his competitors in the rally.

=== Transcontinental "Cannonball" record ===
A prior record for crossing the U.S. from New York City to Los Angeles of 32 hours, 7 minutes was set in 1983 by David Diem and Doug Turner during the US Express, an unofficial successor to the Cannonball Run. The record was unofficial and never documented or confirmed. When documentary filmmaker Cory Welles called it to Roy's attention, he decided he should be the one to break it.

Roy and co-driver Jonathan Goodrich, his longtime friend, completed a practice run in December 2005, finishing with a time of 34 hours and 46 minutes. A subsequent attempt in April 2006 added a spotter plane, but the failure of his M5's fuel pump ended the run in Oklahoma. On October 7 of 2006 Roy and replacement co-driver David Maher, a New York investment banker (who was also his 2003 Gumball co-driver), embarked on another run. On this, the successful 31:04 run Roy claims 2,794 mapped miles and 2800 road miles - which he covered at an average speed of 90.1 mph. The run took place over Columbus Day weekend so as to meet minimal traffic, in part for safety; they also avoided any type of reckless driving such as tailgating, although they reached top speeds of 160 mph. Roy's route, which hit only four toll booths, three or four red lights, and only one close call with the highway patrol in Oklahoma, ended at the Santa Monica Pier.

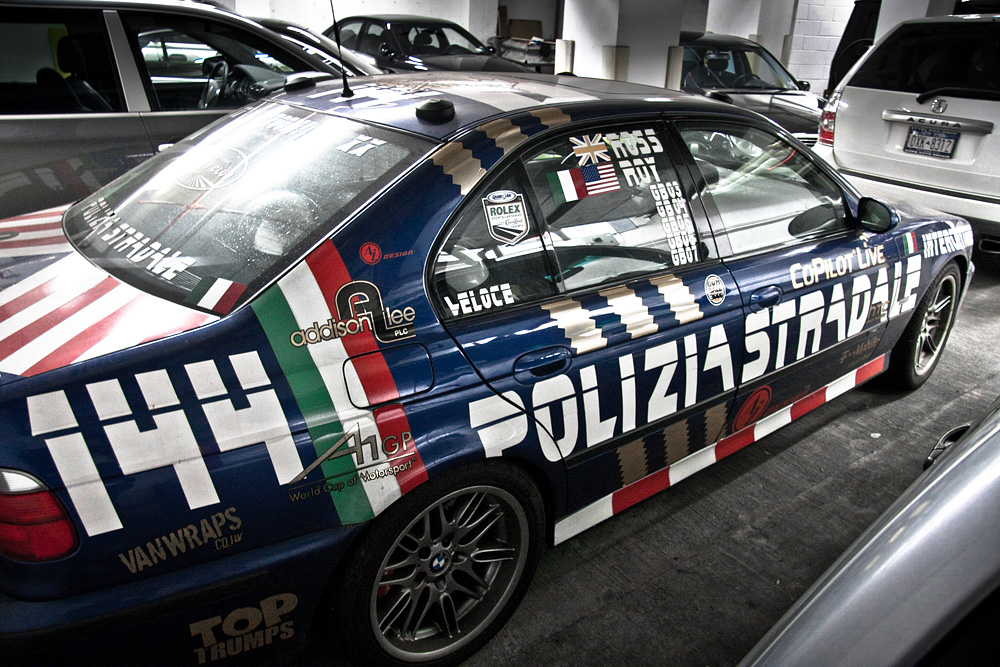
Alex Roy's Team Polizei 144 BMW M5

The record was witnessed in part by Davey Johnson and Mike Spinelli, contributor and managing editor of the automobile blog Jalopnik. The time was recorded by a time clock which was punched as they left New York and flown to California before they arrived.

Another rally driver team, comprising Gumball veterans Richard Rawlings and Dennis Collins, claim they beat the record in May 2007 at 31:59 on a 2,811 mile route; they also claim that Roy did not "stick to the route" of the original Cannonball Run. Alex Roy, on the other hand, claims that almost every year's route was different, and that the only rule was total time point-to-point. The 31:04 record was set with sufficient margin to break the record even with the same route as the longest ever cross-country race. The originator of the Cannonball Run, Brock Yates, does not acknowledge any records or sanction races due to his concern that "somebody was going to get killed". Roy expresses similar concern with regard to anyone attempting to break his claimed record.

In October 2007, Roy published a book on his racing career, The Driver: My Dangerous Pursuit of Speed and Truth in the Outlaw Racing World (HarperCollins, ISBN 978-0-06-122793-6). Information on the record-setting run was withheld until publication.

Roy's transcontinental record was later broken in October, 2013, by Atlanta-native Ed Bolian in 28 hours, 50 minutes and 26 seconds.

=== Electric Vehicle & Semi-Autonomous Driving Records ===
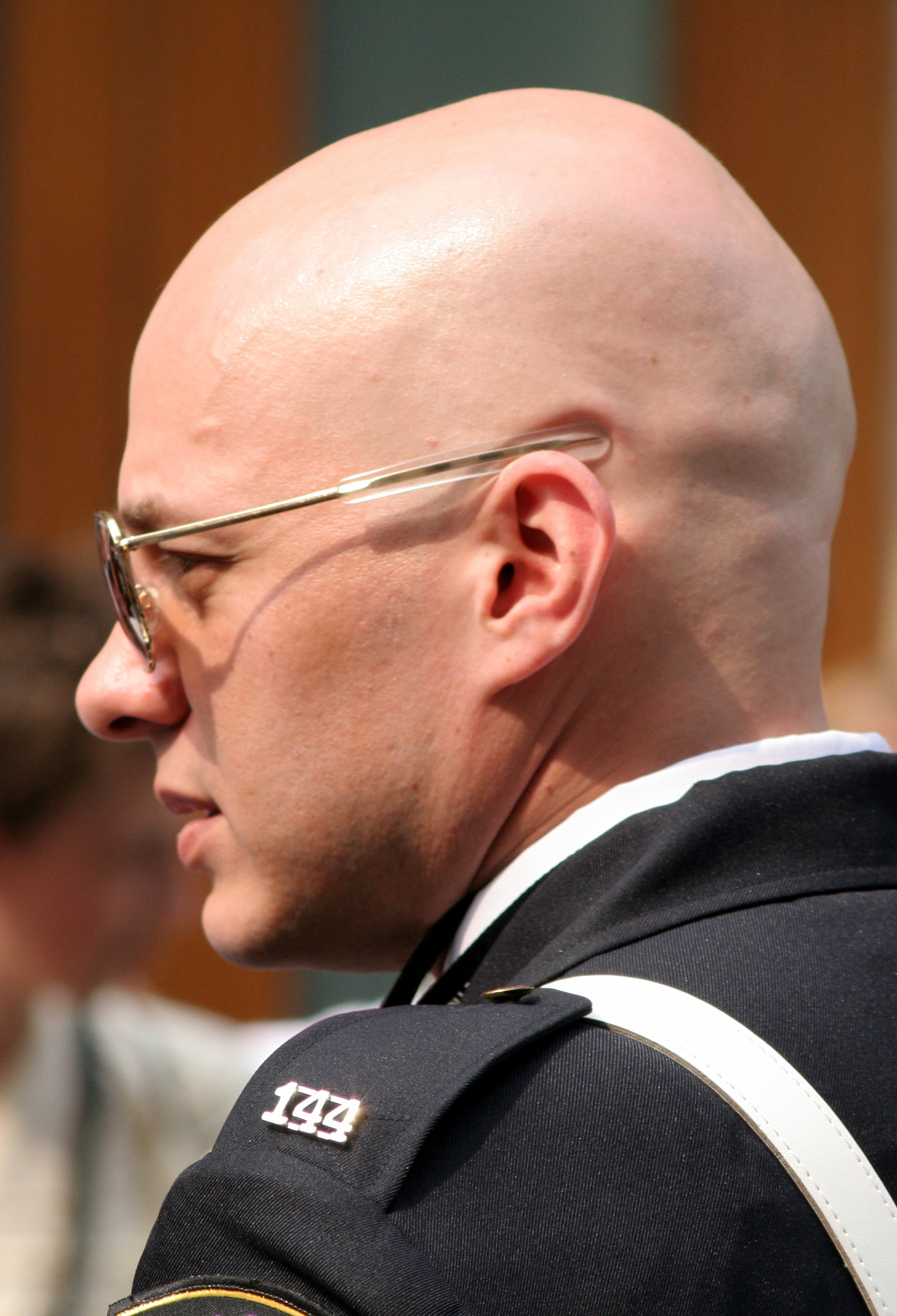
Alex Roy at the start of the 2007 Gumball 3000

In 2015, Roy set another Transcontinental Record, or Cannonball Record, in the electric car class, with a time of 57 hours 48 minutes, from L.A. to N.Y.C., besting the previous time of 58:55, which were preceded by records of 67:21 and 76:05. Roy was with Carl J Reese and Deena Mastracci, who had set the prior 58:55 time. They used a Tesla Model S and its autopilot feature to set the 57:48 time.

From August 24–27 of 2016, Roy and teammates Warren Ahner & Streetwars founder Franz Aliquo broke the Electric & semi-Autonomous Cannonball Run records again, driving a Tesla Model S 90D 2,877 miles from the Portofino Inn to the Red Ball garage in 55 hours, breaking the prior record by 2 hours & 48 minutes. Tesla Autopilot was engaged 97.7% of the journey. GPS data and video evidence was captured using both a US Fleet Tracking device, and Comma.ai's Chffr video logging software.

With an early-production Tesla Model 3, which are delivered to California-based customers only, Roy and co-driver Dan Zorrilla broke the Electric Cannonball Run record again December 28–31 of 2017, driving 2,860 miles eastbound from the Portofino Inn to the Red Ball garage in 50 hours and 16 minutes. GPS data was captured using the GPS Tracks application, and video evidence was shared on YouTube. In July 2019, Roy's record was beaten by a family team of Robin Jedi Thomsen, and her parents Lars Thomsen and Betty Legler with a time of 48 hours 10 minutes driving westbound for 2,835 miles (4,562 km) in a Long-Range Rear-Wheel-Drive Tesla Model 3 between 12 and 14 July 2019.

=== Record Manhattan Lap ===
On September 10, 2001, Roy set the record for fastest driven lap around Manhattan. With a time of approximately 27 minutes, he recalls in his book, mentioned above, that he hit top speeds of 144 mph while committing 151 moving violations — enough to have his New York driver's license suspended 78 times over.

He used a route that would allow him to skip the most northerly and heavily policed sections of the city. Starting at the World Trade Center, which was coincidentally destroyed the next day in a terrorist attack, Roy drove through the Battery Park Underpass, up the Franklin D. Roosevelt East River Drive, across the George Washington Bridge Interchange, down the Henry Hudson Parkway which turns into the West Side Highway finally ending back at the World Trade Center. Though he discusses the lap thoroughly in his book, the video footage has never been released.

In October 2010, a video was uploaded onto YouTube showing Roy's record being broken. The participants in the video are shown taking the same route (though the Battery Park Underpass is saved for the end) and achieving a time of 26 minutes and 3 seconds.

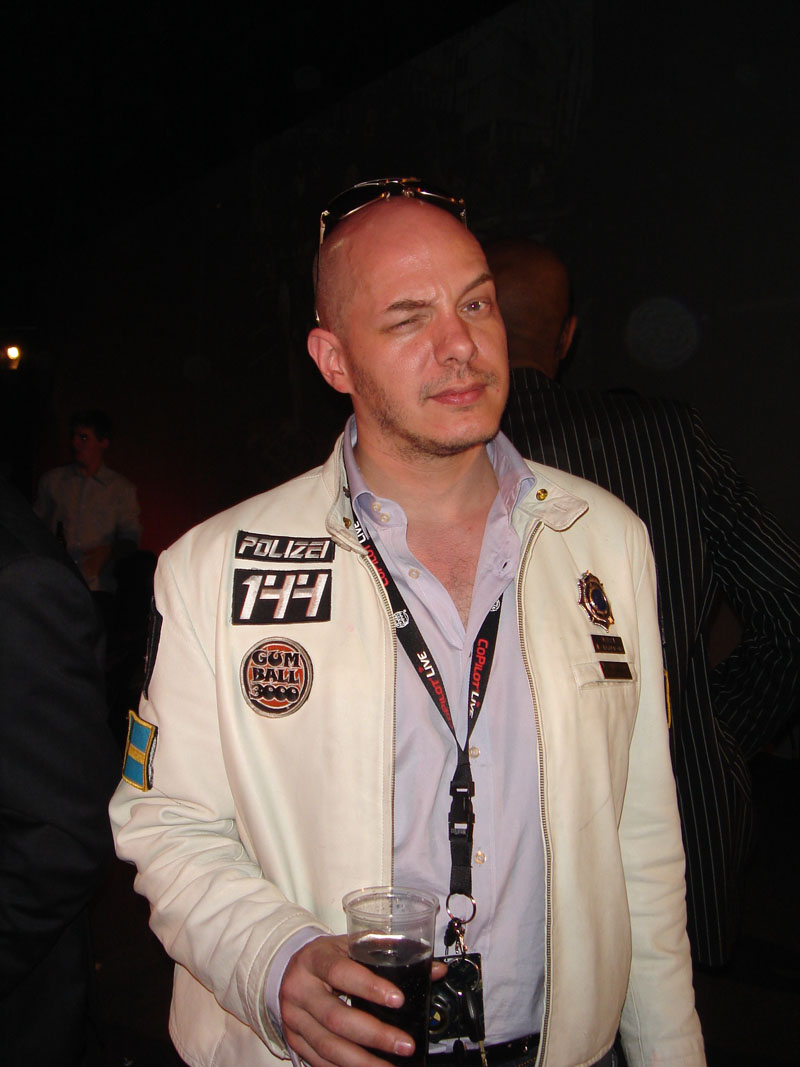
Alex Roy at the 2007 Gumball 3000 rally launch party

In August 2013, Adam "Afroduck" Tang, a Canadian national, set a new unofficial record time of 24 minutes 7 seconds around Manhattan in a manual 2006 BMW Z4 3.0si, filmed it, and put it on YouTube with the title "Fastest Lap of Manhattan 2013". He began the loop out at 116th St and stopped at all but one of the six red lights along the way.

== Business career ==
Roy worked with the YouTube show Fast Lane Daily in a segment known as "Road Testament". The show covered driver safety, track day guides, road rallying, and more.

Roy is currently Editor-at-Large of automotive site The Drive, founder and co-host of the Autonocast (a podcast focused on the future of transportation), and co-host of /DRIVE on NBC Sports, a TV show about cars with Chris Harris and Mike Spinelli, now in its sixth season.

In March 2018, Roy published the Human Driving Manifesto, launching the Human Driving Association, which is focused on protecting private car ownership and control over automated vehicles.

In January 2019, Roy joined Autonomous Vehicle developer Argo.ai as Director of Special Operations. He left that role in December 2022.

In January 2023, Roy co-founded Johnson & Roy, a Strategic Management Advisory firm focused on "Narrative Command" for AI, hard technology, robotics and transportation startups.

In May 2024, Roy co-founded New Industry Venture Capital.

== Personal life ==
Roy is a regular at youth charity balls, formerly chaired the board of New York City's live storytelling series The Moth, currently serves on the board of classical music platform Groupmuse, and in 2004 won a British reality television series, The Ultimate Playboy.
