= Road Wars =

Road Wars may refer to:

- Road Wars (TV series), a British reality television programme
- Road Wars (novel), a novel by Laurence James
- Roadwars, 1987 video game

== See also ==
- Street Wars (disambiguation)
