= Albert Nicholas (disambiguation) =

Albert Nicholas (1900–1973) was an American jazz reed player.

Albert Nicholas may also refer to:

- Albert Nicholas (CEO) (1931–2016), American businessman
- Albert (Peto) Nicholas (1951–2012), Cook Islands politician
- Albert Nicholas (politician, born 1971), his son, Cook Islands politician
