= International Committee for Information Technology Standards =

ANSI-accredited standards development organization

InterNational Committee for Information Technology Standards
- Abbreviation: INCITS
- Established: 1961 (65 years ago)
- Type: Standards Development Organization
- Purpose: U.S. forum dedicated to creating technology standards for the next generation of innovation.
- Headquarters: Washington, D.C., U.S.
- Website: www.incits.org

The InterNational Committee for Information Technology Standards (INCITS), (pronounced "insights"), is an ANSI-accredited standards development organization composed of Information technology developers. It was formerly known as the X3 and NCITS.

INCITS is the central U.S. forum dedicated to creating technology standards. INCITS is accredited by the American National Standards Institute (ANSI) and is affiliated with the Information Technology Industry Council, a global policy advocacy organization that represents U.S. and global innovation companies.

INCITS coordinates technical standards activity between ANSI in the US and joint ISO/IEC committees worldwide. This provides a mechanism to create standards that will be implemented in many nations. As such, INCITS' Executive Board also serves as ANSI's Technical Advisory Group for ISO/IEC Joint Technical Committee 1. JTC 1 is responsible for International standardization in the field of information technology. INCITS operates through consensus.

== Governance ==
INCITS is guided by its Executive Board. The INCITS Executive Board established more than 40 Technical Committees, Task Groups and Expert Groups that are continuously developing standards for new technologies and updating standards for older products.

== Mission ==
The mission statement for INCITS is to provide "An open, collaborative community that enhances the competitiveness of U.S. organizations and brings technological advancement to society through the development and promotion of consensus-driven U.S. and global Information Technology standards." Learn more.

== Standards development ==
More than 2000 standards have been created and approved through the INCITS process, with many more in development. American National Standards are voluntary, unless specifically adopted by government or incorporated into legal requirements.

== Technical Committees ==
INCITS relies on the expertise of thousands of engineers, entrepreneurs, developers, and other professionals to create consensus-driven, market-relevant standards for the tech industry. The INCITS Technical Committees, from cloud computing, artificial intelligence, blockchain, fibre channel, cybersecurity and privacy, biometrics, and more, provide the structure and venues where standards are developed.

== History ==
INCITS was established in 1961 as the Accredited Standards Committee X3, Information Technology and is sponsored by Information Technology Industry Council (ITI), a trade association representing providers of information technology products and services then known as the Business Equipment Manufacturers Association (BEMA) and later renamed the Computer and Business Equipment Manufacturers' Association (CBEMA). The first organizational meeting was in February 1961 with ITI (CBEMA then) taking Secretariat responsibility. X3 was established under American National Standards Institute (ANSI) procedures. The forum was renamed Accredited Standards Committee NCITS, National Committee for Information Technology Standards in 1997, and the current name was approved in 2001.
