= Robert D. Atkinson =

Canadian-American economist (born 1954)

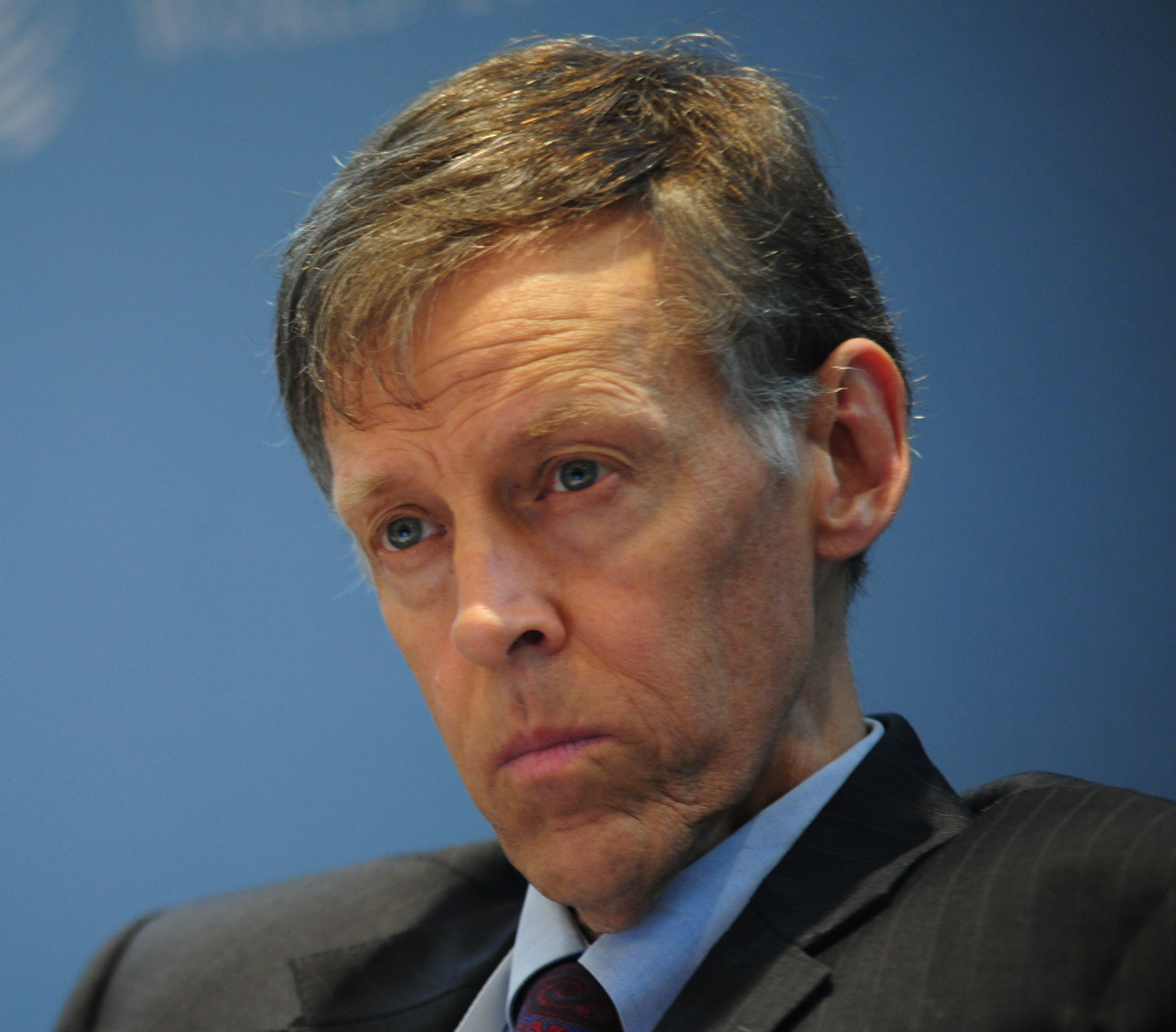
- Robert D. Atkinson in 2013
- Born: November 22, 1954 (age 71); Calgary, Alberta

Academic background
- Education: University of North Carolina at Chapel Hill; University of Oregon

Academic work
- Discipline: Innovation economics Macroeconomics; Development economics
- School or tradition: Innovation economics
- Website: Information at IDEAS / RePEc

Robert David Atkinson (born November 22, 1954) is a Canadian-American economist. He is the founder of the Information Technology and Innovation Foundation (ITIF), a public policy think tank based in Washington, D.C., that promotes policies based on innovation economics. He was previously Vice President of the Progressive Policy Institute.

== Early life and education ==
Atkinson was born in Calgary, Alberta, on November 22, 1954. He moved to the United States in 1962. He received a B.A. from New College of Florida in 1977, a master's degree in Urban and Regional Planning from the University of Oregon in 1985, and a Ph.D. in City and Regional Planning from the University of North Carolina at Chapel Hill in 1989, where he was awarded the Joseph E. Pogue Fellowship.

== Career ==
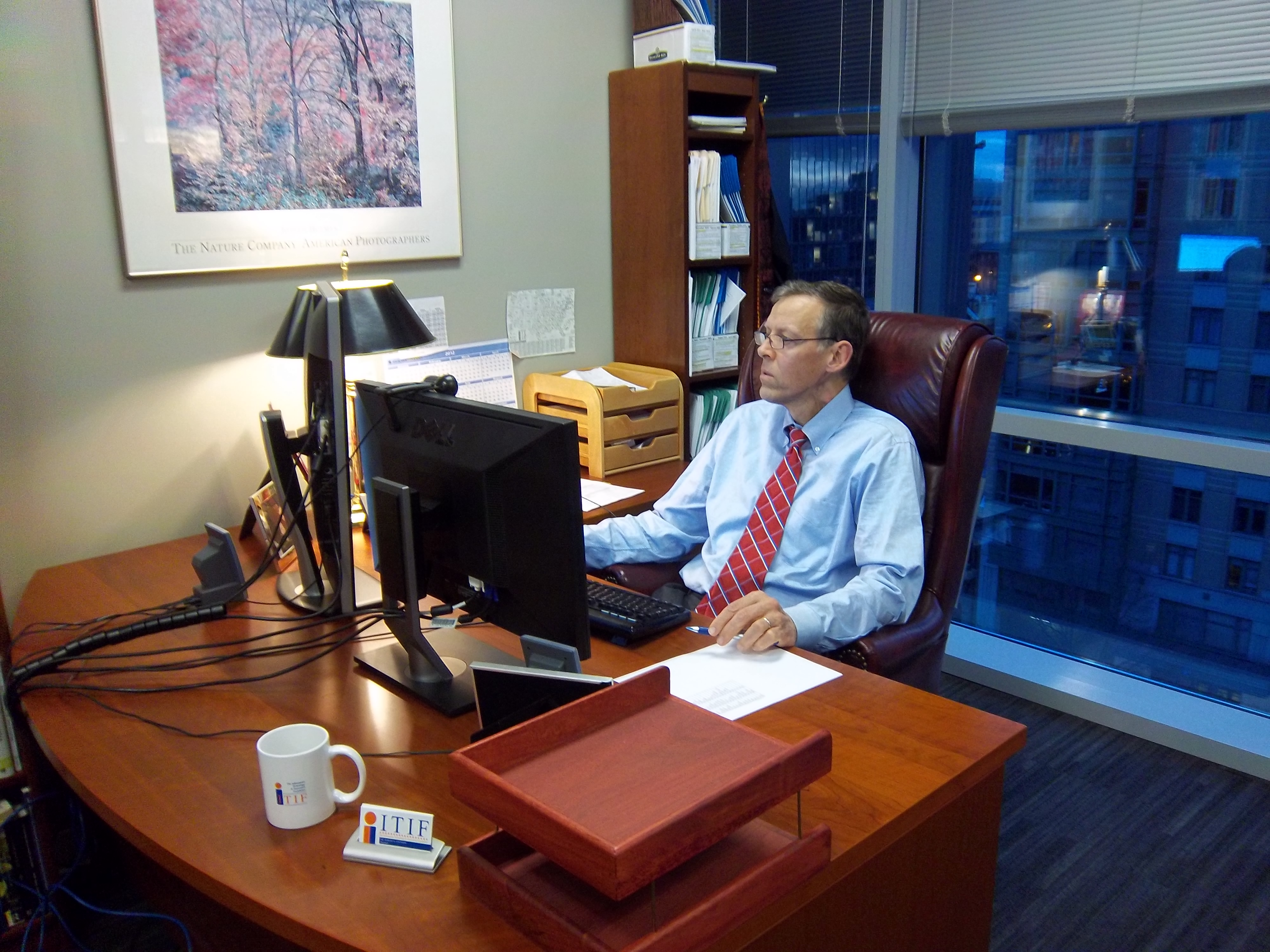
Robert D. Atkinson at ITIF.

Atkinson worked as a program director at the National Institute of Standards and Technology (NIST) from 1989 to 1990. In 1990, he joined the now defunct Congressional Office of Technology Assessment, where he produced reports on the impact of information technology on metropolitan areas and the impacts of environmental regulation and defense downsizing on the economy. From 1996 to 1997, he served as the first executive director of the Rhode Island Economic Policy Council. Atkinson became Vice President of the Progressive Policy Institute (PPI) in 1997, where he directed its Technology and New Economy Project.

In 2006, Atkinson left PPI and founded the Information Technology and Innovation Foundation, which Ars Technica has described as "one of the leading, and most prolific, tech policy think tanks." In 2008, Atkinson was appointed by the Bush administration as chair of the National Surface Transportation Infrastructure Financing Commission. In 2009, he advised the Obama-Biden transition's NIST agency review and Technology, Innovation, and Government Reform teams, and in 2011 the Obama administration appointed him to the National Innovation and Competitiveness Strategy Advisory Board. Atkinson also serves as a nonresident senior fellow at the Brookings Institution.

== Awards and honors ==
- In 1996, Atkinson was named a Small Business Advocate of the Year by the U.S. Small Business Administration.
- In 1999, he was featured in Marquis' Who's Who in America.
- In 2002, he was awarded the Business Transformation Award Silver Medal by the Wharton School and Infosys.
- In 2002, he was honored as one of the "GT 25 Doers, Dreamers and Drivers" by Government Technology magazine and the Center for Digital Government.
- In 2006, he was listed among Inc. magazine's "Best Friends in D.C.: Thinkers."
- In 2009, he was named one of Ars Technica's "Top Tech Policy People to Watch."
- In 2011, Washingtonian magazine named him one of their "Tech Titans."

== Books ==
- The Past And Future of America's Economy: Long Waves of Innovation That Power Cycles of Growth (ISBN 978-1845425760), Edward Elgar, 2005
- Supply-Side Follies: Why Conservative Economics Fails, Liberal Economics Falters, and Innovation Economics is the Answer (ISBN 978-0742551060), Rowman & Littlefield, 2007
- Innovation Economics: The Race for Global Advantage (ISBN 978-0300168990), Yale University Press, 2012
- Big Is Beautiful: Debunking the Myth of Small Business with Michael Lind, (ISBN 978-0262037709), The MIT Press, 2018
- Technology Fears and Scapegoats: 40 Myths about Privacy, Jobs, AI, and Today's Innovation Economy with David Moschella, (ISBN 978-3031523489), Palgrave Macmillan, 2024
