= Street Wars =

Street Wars may refer to:

- Street Wars (TV series), a police reality television programme.
- StreetWars, a water gun tournament
- Street Wars: Constructor Underworld, a video game.
- Street Wars, a DVD "movie" starring Steven Seagal, comprising two episodes of the TV series True Justice
