= Information Technology Industry Council =

- Founded: 1916; 110 years ago
- Headquarters: Washington, DC
- Area served: Global
- Website: www.itic.org

The Information Technology Industry Council (ITI) is a Washington, D.C.–based global trade association that represents companies from the information and communications technology (ICT) industry. As an advocacy organization, ITI works to influence policy issues aimed at encouraging innovation and promoting global competitiveness across the world.

Ars Technica has described the Information Technology Industry Council as "a lobbying group with a membership list that includes almost all the heavy-hitters of the tech world". ITI works to help shape policy pertaining to tax, trade, talent, security, access, and sustainability issues for its member companies through its three main divisions: Environment and Sustainability, Global Policy, and Government Relations. ITI further supports its members by organizing industry-wide consensus on policy issues and providing access to global markets.

Jason Oxman is the current President and Chief Executive Officer of ITI.

According to its website, it was founded in 1916 in Chicago as the "National Association of Office Appliance Manufacturers", renamed the "Office Equipment Manufacturers Institute" in 1929, and became the "Business Equipment Manufacturers Association" (BEMA) in 1961. In 1973, it became the "Computer and Business Equipment Manufacturers Association" (CBEMA), before receiving its current name in 1994.

== Environment and Sustainability Division ==
ITI's Environment and Sustainability division focuses on energy efficiency, product stewardship and electronics recycling, product design and materials restrictions, climate change, and environmentally preferable purchasing.

== Government Relations Division ==
ITI promotes the interface between its member companies and policymakers and thought leaders. In order to accomplish this, it facilitates meetings with key policy individuals at ITI, on Capitol Hill, and with the Administration.

ITI works to pinpoint annual policy priorities for the ICT industry. The association works to help shape policy development for corporate tax, global market access, health IT, intellectual property, STEM education and workforce policy and telecommunications.

== Global Policy Division ==
ITI's Global Policy division works to maintain and promote market access for the ICT industry. ITI collaborates with the U.S. Trade Representative, U.S. Department of Commerce, U.S. Department of State, and U.S. embassies abroad to address expanding global market access. ITI also fosters strong relationships with domestic member company representatives and local industry associations to further its international trade policy priorities.

ITI's Global Policy division targets accessibility, technical standards, regulatory compliance, international trade policy, cybersecurity and China policy, as specific issue areas.

ITI sponsors the International Committee for Information Technology Standards (INCITS) and has provided funding for the Information Technology and Innovation Foundation (ITIF), a Washington, D.C.–based think tank.

== Member companies ==
ITI member companies include:

- Accenture
- Adobe Systems, Inc.
- AMD
- Akamai
- Amazon
- Apple
- Autodesk
- Canon Inc.
- Cisco
- Cognizant
- Corning Inc.
- Crown Castle
- Dell
- Digital Reality
- Dropbox (service)
- eBay
- Equinix
- Ericsson
- Ernst & Young
- Fortinet
- Fujitsu
- Google
- Grant Thornton
- Hewlett Packard Enterprise
- Honeywell
- HP Inc.
- IBM
- Intel
- Intuit
- Iron Mountain (company)
- Juniper Networks
- Keysight Technologies
- Lenovo
- Lexmark
- Logitech
- Mastercard
- Medtronic
- Meta Platforms
- Microsoft
- Motorola Solutions
- NCR Corporation
- NetApp
- Nielsen Holdings
- NortonLifeLock
- Oracle Corporation
- Palo Alto Networks
- Qualcomm
- Rapid7
- Red Hat
- Sabre Corporation
- Salesforce
- Samsung
- SAP SE
- Schneider Electric
- Seagate Technology
- ServiceNow
- Siemens
- SK Hynix
- Snap Inc.
- SoftBank
- SWIFT
- Synopsys
- Tata Consultancy Services
- Tenable, Inc.
- Teradata
- Texas Instruments
- Toshiba
- Toyota
- TSMC
- Twilio
- Twitter
- Verisign
- Visa
- VMware
- Xerox
- Yahoo!
- Zoom (software)
- ZT Systems
