= Applied Security Analysis Program =

Education program at UW-Madison

The Applied Security Analysis Program (ASAP) is an investment education program at the University of Wisconsin–Madison School of Business which offers both MBA and MS degree programs. ASAP students manage over $50 million in equity and fixed-income assets as part of the program's hands-on approach to investment training. During their second year in the program, the students are divided into three teams, two of which manage a combined $5 million of long or long/short equity portfolios and another team that manages over $40 million of fixed-income assets. The learning experience consists not only of individual security analysis but also encompasses investment philosophy, process, trading and risk management.

The ASAP is a CFA Program Partner, which indicates that its curriculum reflects professional practice and is appropriate for students seeking the Chartered Financial Analyst designation.

== History ==
The ASAP was founded in 1970 by Professor Stephen L. Hawk, who served as the program’s academic director from 1970 to 1985. A $100,000 grant from the Brittingham Foundation was used to create the initial student-managed equity fund that sits at the core of the program's real-world approach to investment education.

In 1998, the University of Wisconsin System Board of Regents allocated $10 million of the UW System's Intermediate Term Fund to the ASAP students. The additional assets dramatically increased both the size and complexity of the fixed-income fund. The students now manage three fixed-income portfolios totaling over $40 million.

In 1999, in honor of Professor Hawk’s founding of the program, alumni and friends endowed the Hawk Center for Applied Security Analysis whose faculty now manage the ASAP. In addition to the ASAP, the Hawk Center organizes the biennial Hawk Center Investment Conference, which is attended by many of the program's alumni.
