= Albert Nicholas (CEO) =

American businessman (1931–2016)

Albert O. Nicholas
- Born: January 24, 1931; Rockford, Illinois, U.S.
- Died: August 4, 2016 (aged 85); Milwaukee, Wisconsin, U.S.
- Education: University of Wisconsin–Madison (B.A., M.B.A.)
- Occupations: CEO businessman chartered financial analyst
- Employer(s): Nicholas Company, Inc.
- Known for: All-American guard for the Wisconsin Badgers (1949–1952)

Albert O. "Ab" Nicholas (January 24, 1931 – August 4, 2016) was the chairman, CEO, and portfolio manager of Nicholas Company, Inc. founded in 1967 and based in Milwaukee, Wisconsin. In April 2010, he was one of four inducted into the Wisconsin Business Hall of Fame. According to Bloomberg Markets in 2015, "The Nicholas Fund, which he has run since 1969, has topped the Standard & Poor's 500 Index by an average of 2 percentage points a year for the past 40 years and [beat] it every year since 2008 [through 2014].

== Education ==
Born on January 24, 1931, in Rockford, Illinois, Nicholas earned a Bachelor's in Economics at the University of Wisconsin–Madison and played guard for the Badgers men's basketball team. He spent two years in the military prior to returning for an M.B.A. in Finance and Investments.

== Early career ==
Nicholas began his career at the Northwestern National Insurance Company, where he worked as an investment analyst. He moved on to Marshall and Ilsley Bank before co-founding Nicholas Company.

== Affiliations ==
He was a member of the Milwaukee Investment Analysts Society, and a Chartered Financial Analyst.

== Charitable work ==
In March 2015, the Boys & Girls Clubs of Greater Milwaukee announced "that it has received a $2 million donation from longtime donor and trustee Albert "Ab" Nicholas to fund and develop a recreational basketball league within its clubs." Together with his brothers, William and Daniel, he donated $2,150,000 in 2006 toward a conservatory project in his hometown, Rockford, Ill. The project is now named the Nicholas Conservatory & Gardens, in honor of their parents, William and Ruby Nicholas.

He also made significant contributions to the Milwaukee War Memorial Center as well as the University of Wisconsin. The donation of $50 million was made "to inspire other donors to create undergraduate and athletic scholarships and graduate fellowships for UW-Madison students. The gift will match, on a dollar-for-dollar basis, other donations made to support scholarship programs. The UW Foundation describes the Nicholas' donation as'the second-largest household gift in the university's history.'", Another contribution to the school endowed a deanship for the University of Wisconsin-Madison Business School which had previously been paid with university funds.

Nicholas died on August 4, 2016, at the age of 85. On January 12, 2017, the UW athletic department announced that the Kohl Center basketball floor would be renamed the "Ab Nicholas Court" in his honor with the start of the 2017–18 season.
