= Wisconsin School of Business =

Business school of the University of Wisconsin-Madison

Coordinates: 43.07260°N 89.40163°W

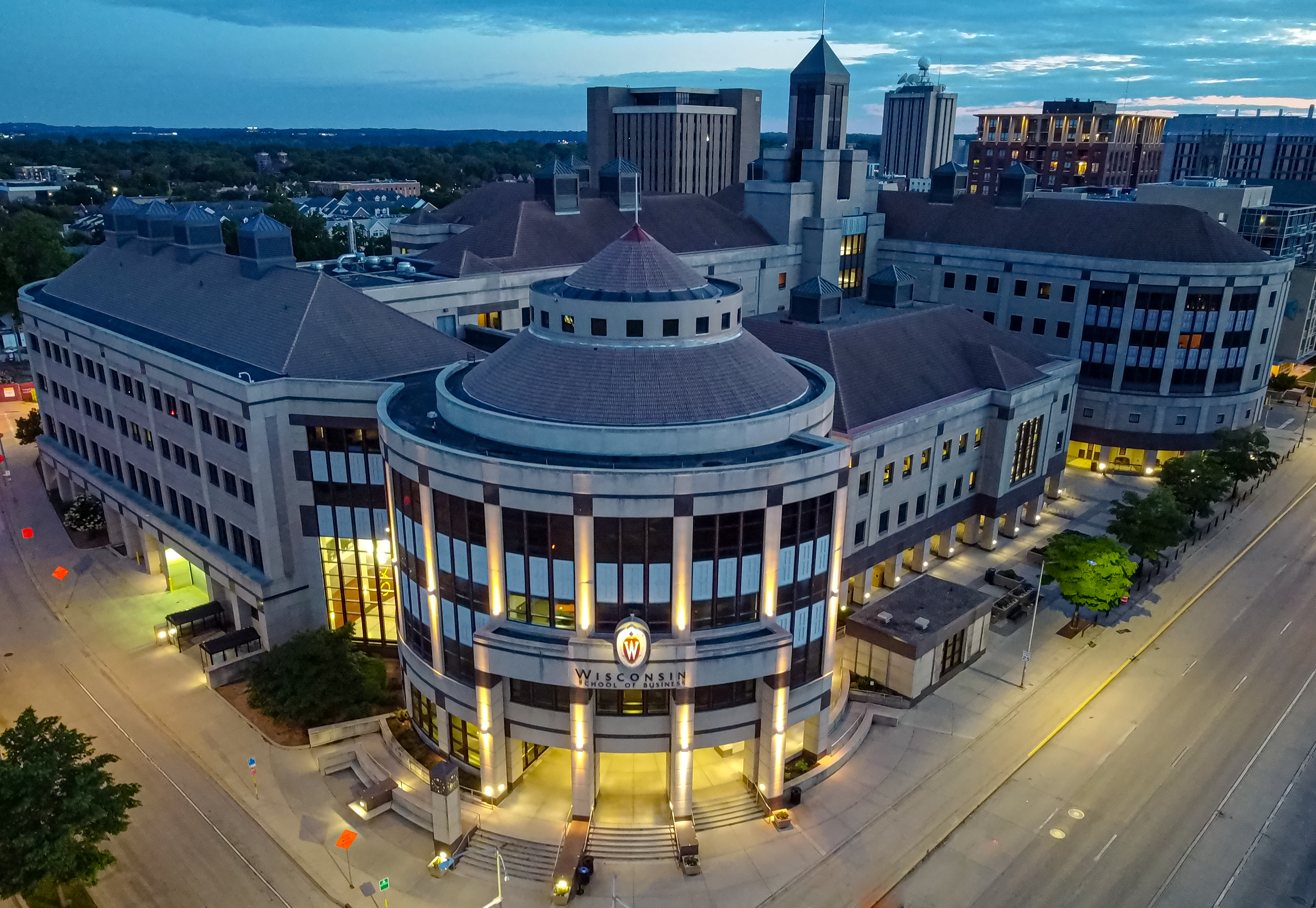
- Grainger Hall
- Motto: "Together Forward"
- Type: Public business school
- Established: 1900; 125 years ago
- Parent institution: University of Wisconsin–Madison
- Endowment: $282 million
- Dean: Vallabh Sambamurthy
- Undergraduates: 5,000
- Postgraduates: 642
- Doctoral students: 92
- Address: 975 University Avenue, Madison, Wisconsin, United States
- Website: business.wisc.edu
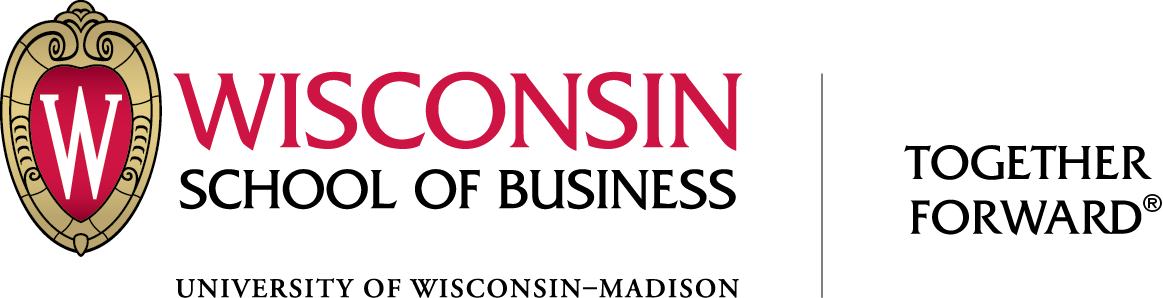

The Wisconsin School of Business (WSB) is the business school of the University of Wisconsin–Madison, a public research university in Madison, Wisconsin. Founded in 1900, it has more than 49,000 living alumni across nearly 90 countries. The undergraduate program prepares students for business careers, offering 11 different majors, while its Master of Business Administration (MBA) program is based on focused career specializations, and its PhD program prepares students for careers in academia. The school offers student services such as Accenture Leadership Center and Huber Business Analytics Lab.

== History ==
In 2005 the Wisconsin School of Business Dean Michael Knetter began approaching alumni with the idea for the naming grant. He asked them to donate $5 million each in the interest of maintaining the school's name as the Wisconsin School of Business for the next 20 years. On October 27, 2007, the Wisconsin School of Business announced the receipt of an $85 million naming gift. A group of 13 alumni known as the "Wisconsin Naming Partnership" donated a minimum of $5 million each. Usually, a school changes its name after receiving a large donation from a single donor or a small group. The agreement made with the Wisconsin Naming Partnership was that the business school would keep its name for the next 20 years, after which the school could change its name if it received another sufficient donation.

== Admissions ==
The Wisconsin School of Business accepts most of its students through either direct admission from high school or the pre-business route, where students apply the spring of their freshman year. The BBA program has approximately 2,500 students. In 2022, the undergraduate acceptance rate stood at roughly 24%, making admissions very competitive and selective.

The full-time Wisconsin MBA is designed around career specializations, instead of general academic majors, and many of the specializations are linked to a Center of Expertise. Applicants to the program apply for admission to these specializations in order to be admitted to the Wisconsin School of Business.

== Academics ==
=== Degree programs ===
The Wisconsin School of Business offers several majors for students interested in business, including: Accounting, Actuarial Science, Finance, Investment, and Banking, Information Systems, International Business, Management and Human Resources, Marketing, Operations and Technology Management, Real Estate, and Risk Management and Insurance.

The UW-Madison Executive Education program offers over 70 open-enrollment courses in a variety of business and financial topics. In 2009, Executive Education introduced the Professional Development Certificate and the Master Practitioner designation.

=== Academic centers ===
The Arthur Andersen Center was established in February 1992 through an endowment from partners, staff, and retired partners of Arthur Andersen, and additional support from the Arthur Andersen Foundation. Programs supported by the center include the Integrated Master of Accountancy (IMAcc), Graduate Master of Accountancy (GMAcc), and PhD in accounting.

The Bolz Center for Arts Administration supports the oldest and longest-running graduate program in arts administration in the world. The center was founded in 1993 with support from a gift by the Eugenie Mayer Bolz Family Foundation.

The Erdman Center supports full-time MBA students in the specialization of operations and technology management and also provides Yellow Belt and Green Belt training in Six Sigma. Originally called the Erdman Center for Manufacturing and Technology Management, the center was officially renamed in 2004.

At its founding in 1991, the Grainger Center was the nation's first endowed, specialized program in supply chain management. Supported programs include undergraduate and graduate degrees in supply chain management, as well as an MBA specialization in supply chain management, which was ranked as a top-ten supply chain graduate program by Gartner in 2018. In the 2020-21 academic year, the program began offering the new undergraduate major in supply chain management.

The Stephen L. Hawk Center for Investment Analysis supports graduate and undergraduate investment education, including serving as the home of the Applied Security Analysis Program (ASAP), where students manage in excess of $20 million in portfolios of equity, investment grade, high yield, and treasury bonds.

Under the instruction of economist Richard T. Ely, the University of Wisconsin established the Institute for Research in Land Economics in 1920, and in 1971, the institute became the Center for Real Estate. In 2007, the center was officially renamed for James A. Graaskamp, a former professor and department chairman of real estate at the university. The center supports graduate and undergraduate education in real estate. In 2020, the real estate program at the university was ranked the second-best real estate program in the US, and the first among public universities.

The Marketing Leadership Institute is a Knowledge Center within the Wisconsin School of Business. The Marketing Leadership Institute (MLI) brings academia and industry together to advance marketing practice and research. The Institute supports any student interested in marketing with a particular interest on students studying for an MBA in the Brand and Marketing Management, Marketing Analytics and Insights, or Tech Product Marketing specializations. The Institute has three Hubs within it that align to these niche specialization areas: the A.C. Nielsen Hub for Marketing Analytics & Insights, the Brand & Marketing Management Hub, and the Technology Product Marketing Hub. In addition to its work with students, the MLI supports alumni and industry members. One way industry gets involved is through the External Advisory Board. The board is composed of top companies leading the way in Marketing.

The Nicholas Center supports the University of Wisconsin's MBA program in Corporate Finance and Investment Banking. The center was established in 2003 through a $6.4 million gift from Albert O. "Ab" Nicholas, former chairman, CEO, and portfolio manager of Nicholas Company, Inc.

The Puelicher Center for Banking Education, established in 1995, is an endowed center focused on undergraduate education in commercial and investment banking, research in banking practices, and partnerships in financial intermediation.

The Robert Beyer Center for Managerial Accounting and Control is affiliated with the Accounting and Information Systems Department of the Wisconsin School of Business and supports research by managerial accounting faculty.

The Weinert Center provides teaching, research, and service pertaining to entrepreneurial management and enterprise development. In 2009, it was named a National Model MBA Entrepreneurship Program by the United States Association for Small Business and Entrepreneurship.

=== Former ===
Originally established as the A.C. Nielsen Center for Marketing Research, the A.C. Nielsen Center was created in 1990 through a donation from Gertrude Nielsen, and Mr. & Mrs. Arthur C. Nielsen Jr. and named for American businessman, electrical engineer and market research analyst Arthur Charles Nielsen. The center trained students in the specialized ideas, issues and techniques of marketing research, consumer insights, and analytics. The Center changed its name to the A.C. Nielsen Center for Marketing Analytics and Insights as of November 2019 to reflect the MBA specialization's greater curricular emphasis on applying data analysis and integrating insights. In July 2022 the A.C. Nielsen Center merged with the Center for Brand and Product Management to create the Marketing Leadership Institute, a new knowledge center. The Marketing Leadership Institute contains a hub which now holds the A.C. Nielsen name.

The Center for Brand and Product Management was created to support students, alumni, and the marketing industry through training in brand management, working closely with MBA students in a Brand and Product Management specialization. In July 2022 the Center for Brand and Product Management merged with the A.C. Nielsen Center to create the Marketing Leadership Institute, a new knowledge center.

== Student life ==
The Wisconsin Undergraduate Business Council represents the interests of students through a Student Senate and student outreach events throughout the year. There are over 45 student organizations, business fraternities, and five student committees. There are student organizations for each of the 10 majors, as well as organizations for other student interests, such as investment banking and socially responsible business. Diverse interests are represented through the Multicultural Business Student Organization, Women in Business, Asian Business and Economic Student Association, and the National Association of Black Accountants.

Students can participate in over 30 study abroad opportunities, as well as student-run workshops by the Accenture Leadership Center.

== Rankings ==
In the 2011 U.S. News & World Report rankings, the Wisconsin School of Business's undergraduate program was ranked 13th overall among business schools, 7th among public institutions, and third among Big Ten business schools. Its undergraduate degree programs ranked nationally as follows:

Real Estate #1

Risk Management #2

Marketing #9

Quantitative analysis, finance, accounting, and management programs all ranking in the top 20 nationally. The school's MBA program was ranked 29th. The Financial Times ranked Wisconsin's Executive Education programs 14th in the U.S. and 28th in the world. Business Week ranked the Wisconsin MBA 4th fastest in the U.S. for the return on investment. In 2009, Business Week ranked the Wisconsin MBA finance specializations 26th in the nation. In 2020, the Marketing specialization for the Full Time MBA was ranked 5th in the Princeton Review's Best MBA for Marketing. In 2012, the Aspen Institute ranked the Wisconsin MBA program 17th worldwide and 15th in the U.S. in "Beyond Grey Pinstripes," a list of the top 100 business schools for environmental, social, and ethical management education.

In 2018, the Wisconsin School of Business was ranked 15th for schools that produce the most startup founders by Business Insider, 6th among public institutions.

In 2023, Poets&Quants ranked the Wisconsin School of Business undergraduate program 22nd in the nation, up 10 rankings from 2022, and top 10 among public universities.

== Notable alumni ==
- Jeffrey Sprecher, Founder, Chairman, and CEO of Intercontinental Exchange, Chairman, New York Stock Exchange
- Steve Bennett, CEO, Symantec, BBA'76
- Kelly Kahl, President, CBS
- Thomas J. Falk, Chairman and CEO, Kimberly-Clark
- Kay Koplovitz, Founder and former CEO, USA Network
- David J. Lesar, CEO, Halliburton
- John Morgridge, Chairman Emeritus, Cisco Systems
- Albert Nicholas, Chairman & CEO, Nicholas Company Inc.
- Paul F. Reilly, Judge of the Wisconsin Court of Appeals
- Lewis Wolff, Real estate developer and former owner of the MLB team the Oakland Athletics
- Randall Boe, former General Counsel, AOL
- Jerome A. Chazen, the current Founder and Chairman of Chazen Capital Partners. He is also one of four founders of Liz Claiborne.
- M. J. Cleary, Former President, Northwestern Mutual Life Insurance Company
- Donald Goerke, Executive at Campbell Soup Company and the inventor of SpaghettiOs
- Kevin Mather, the President and minority owner of the Seattle Mariners of Major League Baseball
- Stephen S. Roach, Chief Economist, Morgan Stanley
- John Rowe, Chairman and CEO, Exelon
