= Michael Knetter =

American economist

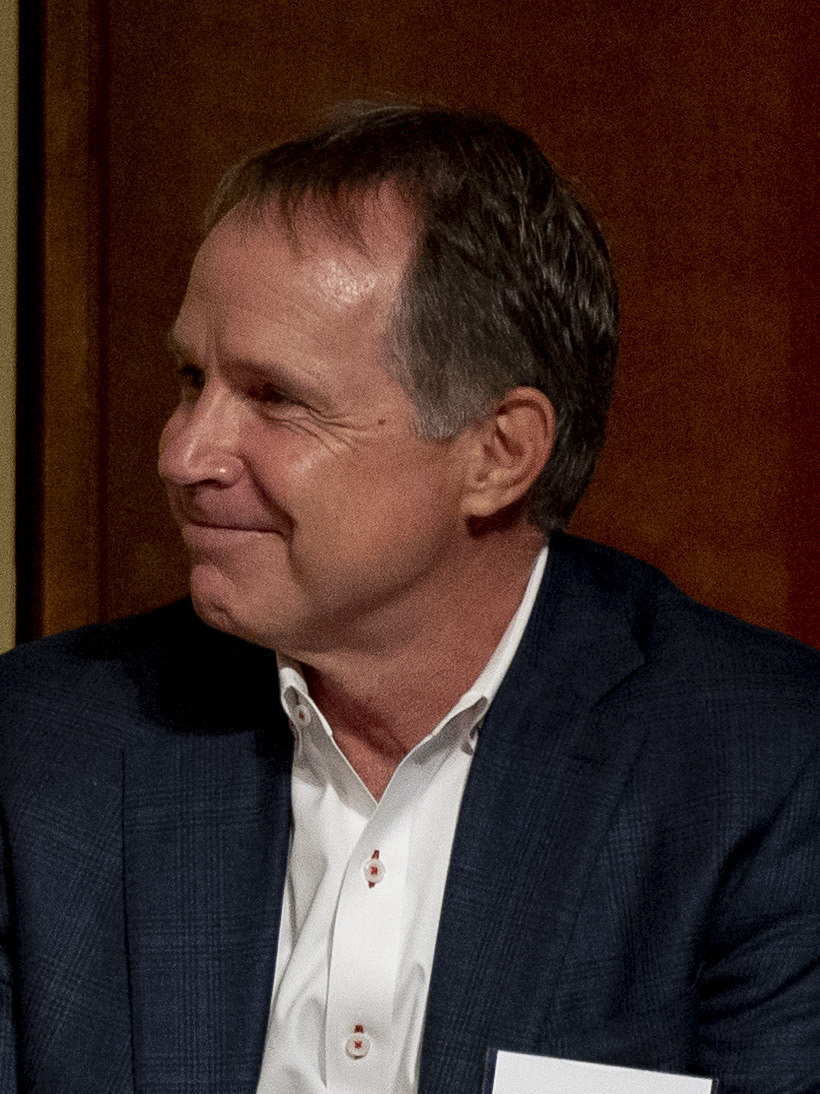
Knetter in 2024

Michael Knetter is a past dean of the Wisconsin School of Business. Effective October 16, 2010, Knetter assumed the position of president and chief executive officer of the University of Wisconsin Foundation—the official fundraising arm of the University of Wisconsin-Madison. Currently he acts as special advisor for the Foundation. He was educated at the University of Wisconsin–Eau Claire and received his doctorate from Stanford University. Knetter is widely published in the field of international and macroeconomics. He was a senior staff economist for Bill Clinton and George H. W. Bush. Before becoming the dean of the Wisconsin School Business he worked as a professor and as the associate dean at the Amos Tuck School of Business at Dartmouth College. He is currently a research associate at the National Bureau of Economic Research.

Additionally, Knetter has received much praise for his fundraising technique. Steven Levitt wrote in The New York Times that "Michael Knetter may just go down as one of the greatest fundraisers of all time." Knetter received this praise due to his 85 million dollar fundraising campaign for the University of Wisconsin-Madison.
