= StreetWars =

StreetWars is a three-week-long water gun "assassination" tournament that was founded in 2004 and still exists today, taking places in different cities around the world. Created by Franz Aliquo and Liao Yutai, the tournament was based on the college and high school game Assassin.

The June 2007 issue of Maxim magazine had an article written by one of the participants of the 2006 London StreetWar.

In August 2014, board game review show Shut Up & Sit Down released a podcast episode reviewing their experiences of the 2014 London StreetWar.

== History and background of the tournament ==
The tournament is loosely based on the game Assassin, popular among some high school and college students. Aliquo and Liao took the game citywide and opened it to anyone above the age of 18, and changed it to a 3 week long, 24/7 format. Featured in the book "Spray," by Harry Edge, as a tournament known as Water Wars, with different directors than the actual game.

The first StreetWars took place in the summer of 2004 in New York City; subsequent tournaments took place in Vancouver (2004), Vienna (2004), New York City (2005, 2006, 2008, 2009, 2014), San Francisco (2005, 2007, 2010, 2015), Los Angeles (2006), London (2006, 2007, 2010), Chicago (2007), and Paris (2007).

StreetWars' last event was in 2015 in San Francisco and now seems to be defunct, with the last update made to its Facebook page in August 2016 and its website no longer live.

== Controversy ==
=== Mayor Bloomberg blasts StreetWars ===
In July 2005, when asked of his opinion on StreetWars, Mayor Mike Bloomberg of New York City said that the creators of StreetWars could probably 'use some psychiatric help'.

=== Police concerns in London ===
Before the start of the game in London in July 2006, police voiced concerns that the associated suspicious activities might lead to deployment of officers and waste of resources.

== The Shadow Government ==
While StreetWars was created by Aliquo and Liao, the tournament itself is operated by an organization that calls itself "The Shadow Government", led by two mysterious figures known only as "Supreme Commander" and "Mustache Commander". His signature is a fedora, mandarin gown, pipe, bottle of Jack Daniels, and mustache. The "Mustache Commander" is the fictional alter ego of Yutai Liao, and the "Supreme Commander" – of Franz Aliquo.

Alter ego of StreetWars co-creator, Yutai Liao, Mustache Commander made his first appearance in StreetWars during the San Francisco 2005 game. Previous to the SF 2005 game, there has only been the Supreme Commander and the mysterious "Assigner".

A giant bottle of Jack Daniel's greets each and every player at the beginning of every tournament, started with the second appearance of the Mustache Commander (the first was with his signature fedora), in a tunnel in Golden Gate Park in the SF 2005 tournament. The Mustache Commander is now often portrayed with a bottle of Jack Daniel's in hand.

== Past winners ==
=== Champions ===
The 'Champion' is the last assassin standing at the end of the three-week regulation period, or the winner of the sudden death tournament.

All games have ended in Sudden Death unless noted.

- NYC 2011 – Handsome Brandon – killed Supreme while hiding under a thimble (Brandon Sherman's Facebook page)
- London 2010 – Rob Gribbin (FFF). Last man standing
- NYC 2010 – Boba Fetch
- San Francisco 2010 – Deadspace
- NYC 2009 – Midnight Toker (Damien DeJesús's Facebook page)
- NYC 2008 – Aqua Man
- Paris 2007 – OSS 117
- London 2007 – Alex Blue – 4Strength4Stam Leather Belt
- Chicago 2007 – Don Thacker (Website)
- San Francisco 2007 – James Flynn
- NYC 2006 – Mr. Peter Stevens
- London 2006 – Abi Davison-Jenkins and Anita Marsden
- LA 2006 – David Jackson
- San Francisco 2005 – Redeye Gonzales
- NYC 2005 – The Crazy 88's

=== Most kills ===
This award goes to the assassin with the most successful hits.

- NYC 2011 – Balls Deep (6 kills)
- London 2010 – Rob Gribbin, FFF (13 kills)
- NYC 2010 – Firefox
- San Francisco 2010 – The Shadow Warriors (9 kills)
- NYC 2009 – The River Rats (8 kills)
- NYC 2008 – Agent Orange (6 kills)
- Paris 2007 – Kone
- London 2007 – Robert Gribbin (11 kills)
- Chicago 2007 – Dos Lobos (5 kills)
- San Francisco 2007 – James Flynn (8 kills)
- NYC 2006 – Team Bushwick Country Club (Website) (11 kills)
- London 2006 – Robert Gribbin (9 kills)
- LA 2006 – Brandon Karrer (7 kills)
- San Francisco 2005 – Sandra Sunderland (7 kills)
- NYC 2005 – Amanda Keylor (7 kills)

=== Golden Mustache Award ===
A golden framed mustache from the Mustache Commander's own personal collection of mustaches, The Golden Mustache Award was first created in the London 2006 game as a reward for the assassin who successfully completes a contract placed on the heads of a wayward team by the Mustache Commander. The award has since been repurposed to live on in future games to acknowledge general excellence in the field of battle.

- NYC 2011 – The River Rats
- NYC 2010 – Gangster
- San Francisco 2010 – Toothless
- NYC 2009 – Bobby Drake
- NYC 2008 – The Hebrew Hammer
- Paris 2007 – Charly Brown (Frederic Gracia)
- London 2007 – Shed Squad ("hoo-ha!")
- Chicago 2007 – Maryanne of Team A.L.I.C.E.
- San Francisco 2007 – Danny Dawson (7 kills)
- NYC 2006 – Adrian Goins
- London 2006 – David Styles

=== Killer2 Best Visual Kill Award ===
- San Francisco 2010 – The Aqua Men (view videos)
- NYC 2008 – Frankie the Hipster Slayer (view video)
- Chicago 2007 – Big Daddy (view video)
- SF2007 – Adam Williumsen (view video)
- LA 2006 – The Chi Squad (view video)

== See also ==
- Assassin (game)
- Urban gaming
- Alternate reality game

== Sources ==
News coverage

- Streetwars tournament reaches finale Channel 4 Special Report 21 Aug 2006
- Real Life: From office employee to assassin with StreetWars CNET8 August 2006
- Bloomberg Says Creator of StreetWars Could Probably 'Use Some Psychiatric Help' New York Sun July 26, 2005
- Have gun, will squirt 130 compete in Street Wars game, where it's soak or be soaked San Francisco Chronicle November 19, 2005
- Stalked by a (fake) assassin Asap (web portal) 7 October 2005
- Games: A Runaway Hit Newsweek Aug. 22, 2005
- On the streets of New York City, adults play a game of 'Assassins' The Record (Bergen County) August 7, 2005
- Girl duo win Street Wars ITV Sun Aug 27 2006
- Ever want to shoot a stranger? Well, you’re in luck Metro NY, SEP 8th 2006
- A Shadowy, Wet World of Squirt-Gun Assassins The New York Times, Sep 26th 2008
- Street Wars London 2010: The Bullets Rain Urban Travel Blog, Sep 18th 2010
