= SAP (file format) =

SAP is a file format that stores music data from Atari 8-bit computers, all of which use the POKEY sound chip. Most popular tunes were written between 1981-1987.

The format is similar to the SID, SPC or NSF formats, in that it is a music data format which is supported by a player, which emulates the central processing unit and sound hardware of the original hardware in order to play music.

SAP files can be played by a SAP player or plugin, currently available for a wide variety of platforms. For instance, on the Macintosh platform, VLC version 2 and above, both on PowerPC and Intel architectures, can play SAP files. In addition, tools exist to convert SAP files to other formats.
