= Act in Support of Ammunition Production =

European Union defense cpability legislation

The Act in Support of Ammunition Production (ASAP), formally Regulation (EU) 2023/1525 of the European Parliament and of the Council of 20 July 2023, was written as a piece of legislation of the European Parliament and adopted by the European Union in July 2023. ASAP has three aims or "tracks":

1. Track 1 supports the use of existing EU member states' ammunition stocks;
2. Track 2 supports joint procurement of ammunition; and
3. Track 3 supports the delivery of ammunition and missiles to Ukraine.

The first tranche of €500 million was disbursed by March 2024.

== History ==
The von der Leyen Commission felt as early as May 2023 that such an act was needed, and in late May it was discussed by the Parliament. The legislation passed with a vote 446 yeas and 67 nays on 1 June 2023.

On 18 October 2023, the first call for proposals was launched. It covered "explosives, powder, shells, missiles, and testing and re-conditioning of older ammunition such as Soviet-era dated ammunition."

The first tranche of €500 million was finalized by 15 March 2024. Grants were approved for 31 projects in 15 member countries.
