= William Boone Bonvillian =

American university lecturer

William B. Bonvillian
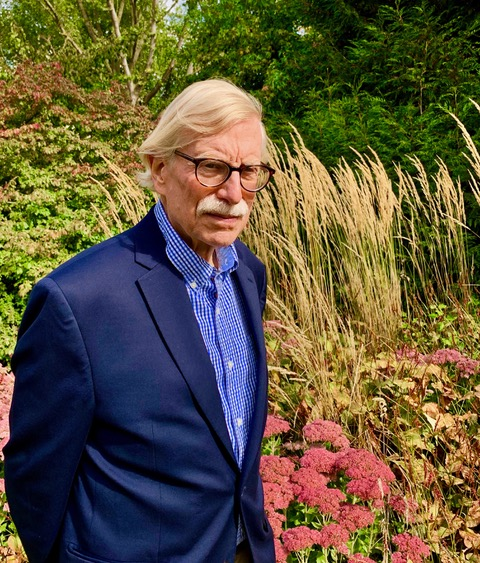
- William B. Bonvillian

Lecturer at Massachusetts Institute of Technology
- Incumbent
- Assumed office 2007

Personal details
- Born: March 7, 1947 Honolulu, Hawaii, United States
- Education: Columbia University (B.A.), Yale Divinity School (M.A.R.), Columbia Law School (J.D.)
- Occupation: Lecturer, researcher, lawyer
- Awards: IEEE Award for Distinguished Public Service (2006) AAAS Fellow (2011)
- Website: Personal website

William Boone Bonvillian, a Fellow of the American Association for the Advancement of Science (AAAS), is a specialist on innovation and technology policy. He is a Lecturer at the Massachusetts Institute of Technology (MIT), teaching innovation policy courses in the departments of Science, Technology and Society and Political Science. He also is a Senior Advisor to the Manufacturing at MIT Initiative, and has served as a Senior Advisor for special projects at MIT Open Learning where he researched workforce education. Bonvillian was named Fellow of the American Association for the Advancement of Science for his work in 2011, and he received the IEEE's award for distinguished public service in 2006.

== Education and early work ==
Bonvillian received a B.A. in 1969 from Columbia University, an M.A.R. in 1972 from Yale University Divinity School, and a J.D. in 1974 from Columbia Law School. Following law school, he was a law clerk to federal judge Jack B. Weinstein of the Eastern District of New York. After two years of law practice, he served from 1977–81 in the Carter Administration in the U.S. Department of Transportation, becoming a Deputy Assistant Secretary for the department's legislative program working on major transportation deregulation laws and other transportation initiatives. Subsequently, he worked as a partner at two Washington law firms.

== Later career ==
In 1989, Bonvillian became chief counsel and legislative director to newly-elected U.S. Senator Joseph Lieberman. Between 1989 and 2006, he worked on projects, including legislation establishing the Department of Homeland Security; reforming the national intelligence system; the Senate's first major "cap and trade" climate change legislation (the "Lieberman-McCain" bills); on innovation and science and technology policy, including the America COMPETES Act of 2007. Throughout this period, he worked extensively on defense R&D legislation and policy, including for DARPA; as an advocate of the DARPA innovation model, he backed subsequent proposals for the Advanced Research Projects Agency-Energy (ARPA-E), for the Homeland Security Advanced Research Projects Agency (HS-ARPA) and the Intelligence Advanced Research Projects Agency (IARPA).

In 2006, Bonvillian became director of MIT's Washington Office. In that capacity he worked on MIT's energy policy initiatives, its project on the "convergence" of the life, physical and engineering sciences, on advanced manufacturing, and on online higher education. In 2007, he began teaching at MIT on innovation systems. In 2017, he stepped down from his Washington role, becoming a lecturer and researcher at MIT.

== Work on innovation policy ==
Bonvillian's work on technology issues for the U.S. Senate and at MIT provided the background for his work on innovation policy and systems. Serving on the adjunct faculty at Georgetown and at John's Hopkins School of Advanced International Studies, as well as teaching at MIT, he developed and taught courses on science and technology and energy technology policy. He has written over thirty articles and book chapters on these topics, with a particular focus on the federal innovation policy role.

In 2009, Bonvillian coauthored the book Structuring an Energy Technology Revolution with Charles Weiss of Georgetown's School of Foreign Service, a former chair of its Science, Technology and International Affairs Department and the first science advisor at the World Bank. Their approach called for to a new, unified, private-public energy technology strategy to foster needed energy advances. This emphasis on a technology policy was presented as a policy alternative, given that progress on a carbon pricing system faced political deadlock.

Building on insights from their work on the barriers to energy technology entry from incumbent fossil fuels, Bonvillian and Weiss authored the book Technological Innovation in Legacy Sectors in 2015.The book described a systems approach to innovation, focused on overcoming two deep problems in the U.S. innovation system: expanding economic growth and raising the rate of creation of quality jobs. It introduced and developed a new concept of "Legacy sectors" – complex, established innovation-resistant economic sectors that constitute most of the economy. The book set forth a conceptual framework to address what they argued had been a neglected problem in innovation theory, of bringing disruptive innovation to these legacy sectors. It added to previous models of the dynamics and stages of innovation, including the new concepts of "extended pipeline" and "manufacturing led" innovation, focusing on the importance of the mechanics of "innovation organization" to technology advance. It identified new drivers to surmount the barriers legacy sectors create to economic growth, including the role of institutional change agents.

In 2018, Bonvillian authored a book with Peter L. Singer, Advanced Manufacturing – The New American Innovation Policies. Bonvillian had served as an advisor to MIT's 2010-13 manufacturing policy initiative, "Production in the Innovation Economy," that resulted in a two-volume study. He also served as an advisor for President Obama's Advanced Manufacturing Partnership (AMP), a consortium of industry university and government experts, that issued major reports in 2012 and 2014. These became the basis for that administration's major technology policy initiative and led to the creation of sixteen advanced manufacturing institutes. The book explored the steep decline in U.S. manufacturing, the offshoring of industrial capacity, and the drop in manufacturing employment by one-third, in the 2000-2010 period. It reviewed the origins of the policy response to this dilemma, which came to be called "advanced manufacturing." It traced how an innovation systems effort was developed to strengthen the U.S. production system and the challenges that remain for implementing this approach.

In 2020, Bonvillian, with Richard VanAtta and Patrick Windham, published a book they edited and contributed to, The DARPA Model for Transformative Technologies. The book collects the leading academic research on the U.S. Defense Advanced Research Projects Agency (DARPA), including four of his own studies. DARPA supported the development of portable GPS, voice recognition software, stealth, autonomous vehicles, unmanned aerial vehicles and, most famously, the Internet The book explored in detail the organizational models DARPA used to achieve these technology advances.

Following up on his work on manufacturing, he turned to leading research projects on workforce education at MIT at its program for Open Learning, which develops online education courses. A book developed from that research, authored with Sanjay Sarma of MIT in 2021, Workforce Education, A New Policy Roadmap. Focusing on manufacturing, healthcare, and retail sectors, the authors investigated programs that reimagine America's broken workforce education system, from short intensive courses that offer industry certifications to new models for apprenticeships. They examine new roles for community colleges, employers, governments, and universities in workforce education, and describe new education technologies that can deliver training to workers. They argue that building a new workforce education system will be key to improving the nation's problems with economic inequality and its need to improve productivity.

In 2024, Bonvillian’s book, Pioneering Progress: American Science, Technology and Innovation Policy was published by MIT Press. The book explores the foundations of American science and technology policy and the dynamics of its innovation system. It examines economic growth theory and the innovation driver behind growth, a new theory of direct and indirect innovation factors, mechanisms for bridging the “valley of death” between research and implementation, the "great groups” behind innovation at the personal level, the DARPA innovation organization model, means to bring innovation to complex, established “legacy” economic sectors, case studies in life science, manufacturing, and energy innovation, organization of optimal workforce and science education, and new efforts toward industrial innovation policy and the evolving organizational framework behind it. The book amounts to an in-depth evaluation of American innovation, positing a series of new innovation theories.

Bonvillian is also author of an historical novel, Flank Speed, on the World War II naval battles off Guadalcanal in 1942, published in 2022.

Bonvillian has authored many peer-reviewed articles and book chapters that focus on topics of innovation organization, energy technology policy, advanced manufacturing, innovation in legacy economic sectors, the DARPA model, and workforce education.

== Other positions, distinctions and awards ==
Bonvillian serves on the National Academies of Sciences' Board on Materials and Manufacturing and its standing committee for its Innovation Policy Forum , served a seven-year term on its Board on Science Education, and on eight other Academies' committees. He chaired the standing Committee on Science, Engineering and Public Policy (COSEPP) at the American Association for the Advancement of Science (AAAS) for four years, served on the board of the Information Technology and Innovation Foundation (ITIF) and is a member of the Babbage Policy Forum on industrial innovation policy at Cambridge University. He was elected a Fellow by the AAAS in 2011 for "socially distinguished" efforts "on behalf of the advancement of science and its applications." He received the IEEE's distinguished public service award in 2006 for his work advancing science policy in Congress.
