= Asap (web portal) =

asap was an Associated Press (AP) multimedia news portal targeted at 18- to 34-year-olds.

It was launched in September 2005 with a stated intention of bringing high quality news content to a seemingly underserved readership segment, and helping the Associated Press members attract that audience. It employed two dozen reporters, editors, photographers and designers at AP headquarters in New York City and in the field who were charged with creating a daily multimedia product that reflected the newsgathering depth and breadth of AP the world's largest newsgathering organization. It included a pop culture blog called "The Slug" written by reporter Derrik J. Lang.

The service included video, audio, Flash presentations, news reports, and features, both domestic and international, and relied heavily on AP reporters around the world. It also featured a significant amount of alternative storytelling and experience-based journalism.

On July 27, 2007, it was announced that the service would be discontinued on October 31, 2007.
