= Coalition of Hope =

US-based non-profit organization

Coalition of Hope Foundation
- Formation: August 2010
- Type: NGO
- Legal status: Non-Profit Charity
- Purpose: Global humanitarian assistance and disaster relief
- Location: Palm Beach, Florida
- Founder & CEO: Timothy J. Keegan
- Website: www.coalitionofhope.org

The Coalition of Hope Foundation, Inc. (COH) is a US-based 501(c)(3), not-for-profit, charitable organization that provides global humanitarian assistance and disaster-relief support. COH was founded by Timothy J. Keegan in 2010.

The Coalition's primary goal is Project Excelsior, a plan to utilize recently decommissioned Tarawa-class amphibious assault ships as its primary operations platforms. These vessels, referred to as a humanitarian assistance disaster relief vessels (HADR/V), will serve as a sea-based platform for conducting humanitarian assistance disaster relief (HADR) operations.

== Operations ==
=== 2021 Afghan Rescue Operations ===
As of 24 August 2021, the Coalition of Hope had airlifted 27 Afghan citizens out of Hamid Karzai International Airport in Kabul. Coalition of Hope Foundation functions as a vetted and approved NGO by multiple US Government agencies, including the US Department of State and Department of Defense. COH is as an authorized facilitator of humanitarian relief and evacuations, according to a 24 August 21 Catholic Herald Tribune online article.

=== 2012 Hurricane Sandy ===
In October 2012 Hurricane Sandy devastated the US Northeast. The Coalition of Hope Foundation partnered with Catholic Relief and focused on providing assistance to residents of Rockaway Beach, Long Island, NY. A fundraising concert to benefit Rockaway Relief featuring 'Celtic Thunder' was sponsored by Coalition of Hope on 3 December 2012

Coalition of Hope also began a mold-remediation program in partnership with TruPro Restoration of Spring Brook Township, PA. Coalition of Hope Foundation ended its involvement with Hurricane Sandy relief operations in June 2013. On 18 June, CoH held a "Post Superstorm Sandy Rebuilding Resources Conference" at the Museum of Modern Art, Rockaway New York. This conference served to close out CoH's involvement in relief operations and provide the remaining stakeholders a forum to discuss best practices and lessons learned.

=== 2010 Haiti earthquake ===
The Coalition of Hope Foundation was active in relief operations to Haiti after the January 2010 earthquake. Foundation CEO Tim Keegan solicited corporations for donations of relief materials, and corporate sponsors responded and donated an estimated 1.2 million pounds of supplies for Haiti relief operations. Keegan worked with Operation Big Heart Brigade and the 143rd Expeditionary Sustainment Command (ESC) to transport the donated supplies to Haiti from the Florida collection-point at Opa-Locka Airport in Miami FL.

== Project Excelsior ==
The Coalition of Hope Foundation's Project Excelsior focuses on acquiring decommissioned U.S. Navy assault carriers (LHA) and rebuilding them as dedicated HADR/V vessels.

In response to the 2010 earthquake which devastated Haiti, the U.S. sent the USNS Comfort (T-AH-20) as a relief operation. USNS Comfort, and her sister USNS Mercy (T-AH-19), are converted oil tankers and were designed to serve as floating hospitals for USN carrier groups. In the Haiti mission, USNS Comfort proved to have shortcomings in disaster relief operations. The two major shortcoming were the vessel's speed (17.5 knots) and patient transfer capability.

Patient transfer to USNS Comfort is hampered by a small flight deck, with space for only two CH53 Sea Stallions, and hull access from the waterline via a two story external ladder. In comparison, the Tarawa-class amphibious assault ships have 11 landing zones for rotary wing aircraft, and a well-deck at the rear of the vessel for launching and receiving amphibious vehicles headed to and from shorelines. Additionally, Tarawa-class LHA's draft is two meters less than either the USNS Mercy or USNS Comfort, enabling a shorter stand-off distance from shorelines.
