= Ray Stark =

American film producer (1915–2004)

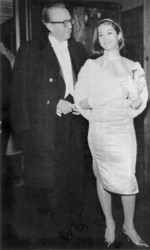
- Ray Stark with Nancy Kwan at the London premiere of The World of Suzie Wong, 1960
- Born: Raymond Otto Stark; October 3, 1915; New York City, U.S.
- Died: January 17, 2004 (aged 88); Los Angeles, California, U.S.
- Education: Rutgers University
- Occupations: Film producer, Literary and talent agent
- Years active: 1939–2004
- Agent(s): Famous Artists Agency, Seven Arts Productions, Rastar Film
- Spouse: Frances Brice (m. 1940; died 1992)
- Children: 2
- Relatives: Fanny Brice (mother-in-law); William Brice (brother-in-law)

Raymond Otto Stark (October 3, 1915 – January 17, 2004) was an American film producer and talent agent. Stark's background as a literary and theatrical agent prepared him to produce some of the most profitable films of the 1960s, 1970s, 1980s, and 1990s, such as The World of Suzie Wong (1960), West Side Story (1961), The Misfits (1961), Lolita (1962), The Night of the Iguana (1964), Reflections in a Golden Eye (1967), Funny Girl (1968), The Owl and the Pussycat (1970), The Goodbye Girl (1977), The Toy (1982), Annie (1982), and Steel Magnolias (1989).

In addition to his roster of films, Stark formed relationships with various directors and writers throughout his career. Stark made eight films with Herbert Ross, five with John Huston, and three with Sydney Pollack. Additionally, Stark's 18-year partnership with playwright Neil Simon yielded 11 films between the duo, including The Goodbye Girl (1977) and The Sunshine Boys (1975). In 1980, the Motion Picture Academy awarded him the Irving G. Thalberg Memorial Award for lifetime achievement in film.

== Early life ==
Raymond Otto Stark was born on October 3, 1915, in Manhattan, the second child of Sadie (née Gotlieb) and Maximilian Stark. Ray grew up on East 58th Street near Central Park. It was Ray's mother who took a dutiful approach to his education, grooming him to be well-read and precocious. Ray attended grade school in Manhattan, skipping two grades, before attending The Kohut School, a boarding school for boys in Harrison, New York. There, Stark's major scholastic interest was writing; he wrote articles for the school's newspaper, The Kohut Klipper, in which his first article was an interview with actress Ginger Rogers whom he brazenly approached after seeing her in a play.

In 1931, at 15 years of age, Stark was the youngest student ever admitted to Rutgers University in New Brunswick, New Jersey. At Rutgers, Stark continued to take a strong interest in literature (one of his favorite classes was on Shakespeare) but he did not know how to pursue it occupationally. In 1935, Stark returned to Manhattan to attend NYU Law, although he did not graduate.

As Stark's interests shifted to journalism and entertainment, he took an opportunity to live with a friend in Los Angeles. Following a job at Forest Lawn Cemetery as a florist and then as writing assistant to comedian and ventriloquist Edgar Bergen, Stark took a job as a publicist for Warner Bros. Studios in 1937.

Stark served in the U.S. Navy during World War II. He later moved to the television industry, so he was employed by Associated Artists Productions, briefly dabbled into film production, before many employees start Seven Arts Productions in early 1958.

== Seven Arts Productions (with Eliot Hyman) ==
In 1957 Ray Stark and Eliot Hyman founded Seven Arts Productions, an independent production company that made movies for release by other studios. Stark was head of production, in charge of buying film properties and supervising production, while Hyman was instrumental in forming deals and handling finances. West Side Story, Anatomy of a Murder, By Love Possessed, The Nun’s Story, and Night of the Iguana, were among some of the first works purchased by Stark with Seven Arts. However, Stark chose to produce The World of Suzie Wong first, a lesser-known play outside of Seven Arts.

The World of Suzie Wong, which originally cast the lead from the Broadway production, France Nuyen, went on to star and mark the discovery of Chinese actress Nancy Kwan. Interpersonal complications with France Nuyen interfered with shooting, and Stark replaced her with newcomer Nancy Kwan, who was later nominated for a Golden Globe Best Actress in the role.

== Rastar Productions ==

In 1966, Stark left Seven Arts to found his own production company, Rastar Productions. Rastar's first production was the film version of Funny Girl, starring Barbra Streisand. The company went on to produce many notable films from the 1970s to the early 2000s, including The Owl and the Pussycat (1970), The Way We Were (1973), Murder By Death (1976), The Goodbye Girl (1977), Seems Like Old Times (1980), Annie (1982), Steel Magnolias (1989), and Harriet the Spy (1996). In 1974, Rastar was acquired by Columbia Pictures, which included all Rastar property including the following Rastar property: Rastar Productions, Rastar Pictures, Rastar Features, and Rastar Television. Ray Stark then founded Rastar Films, later selling that to Columbia Pictures as well in 1980. Stark later formed with Daniel Melnick of The IndieProd Company, Rastar/IndieProd in 1989, at Carolco Pictures.

Stark's final film (as Rastar Television) was the 2000 TV movie Alley Cats Strike, which was co-produced by Walt Disney Television and aired on Disney Channel. Rastar was closed when Stark himself died in 2004 and all assets were folded into now Columbia Pictures.

== Movies with Barbra Streisand ==
Although stage and film actress Anne Bancroft was the initial choice to play Fanny Brice in Funny Girl (the biopic production based on Stark's iconic mother in-law), Stark felt drawn to Barbra Streisand, an unknown singer and performer on the rise in New York City. After a long courtship with the then unknown actress, Stark and Jerome Robbins (the production supervisor and director of the Broadway show) decided to cast her as their lead.

After an arduous rehearsal period filled with revisions and rewrites, Funny Girl opened to rave reviews on Broadway and became a critical and commercial success. Stark had the smash hit he'd hoped for, and Streisand emerged as a full-fledged star. For both, it was the beginning of an often stormy relationship that would span four more motion pictures for eleven years. Following the Broadway show, Stark formed Rastar Productions to finance the film version of Funny Girl due to foiled deals with Columbia and Paramount Pictures. After a year of difficult negotiations, Stark signed Streisand to Rastar Productions in a lengthy contract that bound Stark and Streisand to make four more films together: The Owl and the Pussycat (1970), The Way We Were starring Robert Redford, directed by Sydney Pollack (1973), For Pete’s Sake (1974), and Funny Lady (1975).

=== Background ===
Stark married Fanny Brice's and Nick Arnstein's daughter Frances Brice in 1940. In telling Fanny's story, Stark would produce the Broadway musical, film version, and film sequel Funny Lady (all starring Streisand).

Stark commissioned an authorized biography of Brice, based on taped recollections she had dictated, but was dissatisfied with the result. He ultimately paid $50,000 to prevent publication of the book, which the author had titled The Fabulous Fanny.

Stark then turned to Ben Hecht to write the screenplay for a biopic, but neither Hecht nor the 10 writers who succeeded him were able to produce a version that satisfied Stark. Finally, Isobel Lennart submitted My Man, which pleased both Stark and Columbia Pictures executives, who offered Stark $400,000 plus a percentage of the gross for the property.

After reading the screenplay, Mary Martin contacted Stark and proposed it be adapted for a stage musical. Stark discussed the possibility with producer David Merrick, who suggested Jule Styne and Stephen Sondheim compose the score. Sondheim told Styne "I don't want to do the life of Fanny Brice with Mary Martin. She's not Jewish. You need someone ethnic for the part." Shortly after, Martin lost interest in the project and backed out.

Merrick discussed the project with Jerome Robbins, who gave the screenplay to Anne Bancroft. She agreed to play Brice if she could handle the score. Merrick suggested Styne collaborate with Dorothy Fields as a lyricist, but she was not interested. He went to Palm Beach, Florida for a month and composed music he thought Bancroft would be able to sing. While he was there, he met Bob Merrill, and he played the five melodies he already had written for him. Merrill agreed to write lyrics for them; these included "Who Are You Now?" and "The Music That Makes Me Dance." Styne was happy with the results and the two men completed the rest of the score, then flew to Los Angeles to play it for Stark, Robbins, and Bancroft, who was at odds with Merrill because of an earlier personal conflict. She listened to the score, then stated "I want no part of this. It's not for me."

With Bancroft out of the picture, Eydie Gormé was considered, but she agreed to play Brice only if her husband Steve Lawrence was cast as Nicky Arnstein. Because they thought he was wrong for the role, Stark and Robbins approached Carol Burnett, who said "I'd love to do it but what you need is a Jewish girl." With options running out, Styne thought Barbra Streisand, whom he remembered from I Can Get It for You Wholesale, would be perfect. She was performing at the Bon Soir in Greenwich Village, and Styne urged Robbins to see her. He was impressed and asked her to audition. Styne later recalled "She looked awful...All her clothes were out of thrift shops. I saw Fran Stark staring at her, obvious distaste on her face." Despite his wife's objections, Stark hired Streisand on the spot.

Robbins had an argument with Lennart and told Stark he wanted her replaced because he thought she was not capable of adapting her screenplay into a viable book for a stage musical. Stark refused and Robbins quit the project.

Funny Girl temporarily was shelved, and Styne moved on to other projects, including Fade Out – Fade In for Carol Burnett. Then Merrick signed Bob Fosse to direct Funny Girl, and work began on it again until Fosse quit and the show went into limbo for several months. Then Merrick suggested Stark hire Garson Kanin. It was Merrick's last contribution to the production; shortly afterward he bowed out, and Stark became sole producer.

Streisand was not enthusiastic about Kanin as a director and insisted she wanted Robbins back, especially after Kanin suggested "People" be cut from the score because it didn't fit the character. Streisand already had recorded the song for a single release, and Merrill insisted "It has to be in the show because it's the greatest thing she's ever done." Kanin agreed to let it remain based on audience reaction to it. By the time the show opened in Boston, people were so familiar with "People" they applauded it during the overture.

There were problems with the script and score throughout rehearsals, and when Funny Girl opened in Boston it was too long, even though 30 minutes had been cut. The critics praised Streisand but disliked the show. Lennart continued to edit her book and deleted another 30 minutes, then the show moved to Philadelphia, where critics thought the show could be a hit if the libretto problems were rectified.

The New York opening was postponed five times while extra weeks were played out of town. Five songs were cut, and "You Are Woman", a solo for Sydney Chaplin, was rewritten as a counterpoint duet. Streisand was still unhappy with Kanin and was pleased when Robbins returned to oversee the choreography by Carol Haney.

== Films with John Huston ==
A close friend and creative confidant of John Huston, Stark produced four highly successful films with the visionary director. Stark and Huston formed a close bond while shooting Tennessee Williams' The Night of The Iguana (1964) starring Richard Burton and Ava Gardner on-location in Puerto Vallarta, Mexico. Following their success, Huston and Stark went on to create Reflections in a Golden Eye (1967), based on the 1941 novel by author Carson McCullers and starring Marlon Brando and Elizabeth Taylor, Fat City (1972), and the commercially successful 1982 adaption of Annie the musical starring Albert Finney, Carol Burnett, Ann Reinking, Tim Curry, Bernadette Peters, Geoffrey Holder, Edward Herrmann, and Aileen Quinn in her film debut.

== Films with Neil Simon ==
Over an 18-year period Stark produced eleven scripts by acclaimed playwright Neil Simon, including The Sunshine Boys (1975), for which George Burns won the Oscar for Best Supporting Actor; Murder by Death (1976), featuring an eclectic cast of Eileen Brennan, Truman Capote, James Coco, Peter Falk, Alec Guinness, Elsa Lanchester, David Niven, Peter Sellers, and Maggie Smith; The Goodbye Girl (1977) with Richard Dreyfuss and Marsha Mason, for which Dreyfus won the Academy Award for Best Actor; and California Suite (1978), which won Maggie Smith the Academy Award for Best Supporting Actress. Other Neil Simon/ Rastar collaborations included Seems Like Old Times (1980), with Goldie Hawn and Chevy Chase; The Cheap Detective, starring Peter Falk, and Chapter Two with James Caan and Marsha Mason.

== Irving G. Thalberg Memorial Award ==
In 1980, Stark's body of work was officially recognized when he received the Irving G. Thalberg Memorial Award, an honor given by the Academy of Motion Picture Arts and Sciences for lifetime achievement in film. Presented by Kirk Douglas, whom Stark represented at Famous Artists Agency, Douglas introduced Stark as the unseen "Oz" of Hollywood. Stark was known for his distaste for public appearances and belief that talent, not producers, should receive all public attention. Stark was later awarded the David O. Selznick Lifetime Achievement Award from the Producers Guild of America in 1999, with guild President Thom Mount calling him "one of Hollywood's most prolific film producers ... the stuff of legend".

== Personal life ==
Soon after relocating to Los Angeles from New York City, Ray met his future wife, Frances Brice, at a party. She mentioned that her mother was “Baby Snooks,” the comedic actress Fanny Brice, and her father was Nicky Arnstein. Although Stark failed to remember who the actress was, he soon fell in love with Fran, saying she was the most charming girl he'd ever met. Following a brief courtship, they were married on September 26, 1940. The couple had two children, Peter and Wendy. Peter Stark (1944–1970) died by suicide in New York City. Ray Stark died of heart failure in his Los Angeles home on January 17, 2004, aged 88.

Despite a busy schedule throughout his career, Ray made time for his interest in horses. Ray and his wife Frances owned Rancho Corral de Quati, a 300-acre (1.2 km²) ranch in Los Olivos, California and were breeders of Thoroughbred racehorses. A passionate horse lover, Stark was twice named California Thoroughbred Breeder of the Year.

Stark was an art collector. He amassed a broad collection of outdoor sculptures by artist and close friend Henry Moore, and he owned pieces by Monet, Picasso, and Kandinsky. Stark's outdoor sculpture collection was bequeathed to the Getty Museum, where it is on display. The Fran and Ray Stark Sculpture Garden opened in 2007 and accounts for approximately 75% of the sculptures in the museum's collection.

Stark was accused of sexism and sexual harassment by director Claudia Weill during the production of It's My Turn (film). Weill claims this is the reason she quit directing feature films.

=== Philanthropy ===
In 1982, Fran and Ray Stark established The Fran and Ray Stark Foundation, which is committed to the growth of community art, culture, and medicine. The Stark Foundation supports institutions in Los Angeles such as The Academy of Motion Pictures Arts and Sciences, USC School of Cinematic Arts, Motion Picture and Television Country House, Los Angeles County Museum of Art, Homeboy Industries, and several Department Chairs at David Geffen School of Medicine at UCLA.

The Ray Stark Family Theatre, equipped for 3D presentation, is one of three situated in the University of Southern California's School of Cinematic Arts Complex, completed in 2010.

== Films ==
As producer unless otherwise noted.

=== Film ===
Year	Film	Credit	Notes
1960	The World of Suzie Wong	Executive producer	
1964	The Night of the Iguana		
1966	This Property Is Condemned		Uncredited
1966	Drop Dead Darling		
1967	Oh Dad, Poor Dad, Mamma's Hung You in the Closet and I'm Feelin' So Sad		
1967	Reflections in a Golden Eye		
1968	Funny Girl		
1970	The Owl and the Pussycat		
1972	To Find a Man	Executive producer	Uncredited
1972	Fat City		
1973	The Way We Were		
1975	Funny Lady		
1975	The Sunshine Boys		
1975	The Black Bird	Executive producer	
1976	Robin and Marian	Executive producer	Uncredited
1976	Murder by Death		
1977	The Goodbye Girl		
1977	Smokey and the Bandit		Uncredited
1978	Casey's Shadow		
1978	The Cheap Detective		
1978	California Suite		
1979	Chapter Two		
1979	The Electric Horseman		
1980	Somewhere in Time		Uncredited
1980	Seems Like Old Times		
1982	Annie		
1982	The Toy		
1985	The Slugger's Wife		
1986	Brighton Beach Memoirs		
1988	Biloxi Blues		
1989	Steel Magnolias		
1993	Lost in Yonkers		Final film as a producer

Miscellaneous crew

Year	Film	Role	Notes
1961	West Side Story	Production executive	Uncredited
1966	This Property Is Condemned	Presenter	

=== Television ===
Year	Title	Credit	Notes
1975	Funny Girl to Funny Lady		Television special
1990	Steel Magnolias	Co-executive producer	Television pilot
1993	Barbarians at the Gate		Television film

Thanks

Year	Title	Role	Notes
1999	Annie	Acknowledgment	Television film
