= Debra Mooney =

American actress

- Born: Debra Vick; Aberdeen, South Dakota, U.S.
- Occupation: Actress
- Years active: 1972–present

Debra Mooney is an American character actress, well known for her role as Edna Harper on The WB (now The CW) drama series Everwood (2002–06). Mooney is also known for her recurring roles in Scandal, Grey's Anatomy and The Originals.

== Life and career ==
Mooney was born Debra Vick in Aberdeen, South Dakota, and grew up in Ellendale, North Dakota. She was married to stage manager, producer, and director Porter Van Zandt until his death in 2012.

Mooney is best known for her role as Edna Harper on The WB drama series Everwood. The series aired from 2002 to 2006. She has appeared in many stage productions and played roles of over 80 films and TV shows. Her notable film credits include Chapter Two opposite Marsha Mason, and Tootsie, Dead Poets Society and Domestic Disturbance.

On television she also starred of short-lived series Dream Street, Davis Rules and Kirk. Mooney guest-starred as the oblivious plutocrat Meg Wellman on Roseanne. She also appeared in Seinfeld, ER, Everybody Loves Raymond, Grey's Anatomy, Bones and Weeds. From 2012 to 2013, she played the role of Supreme Court Justice Verna Thornton in the second season of ABC drama series Scandal created by Shonda Rhimes.

In 2014, she had a recurring role in the Netflix comedy series, Arrested Development. That same year, she joined the cast of The CW series, The Originals in a recurring role as Mary Dumas. In 2016, she starred in the ABC drama pilot The Death of Eva Sofia Valdez, starring Gina Torres in a title role, with Eric Close, Melora Hardin, and Christina Pickles.

== Filmography ==
=== Film ===
Year	Title	Role	Notes
1979	Chapter Two	Marilyn	
1982	Tootsie	Mrs. Mallory	
1982	Supervisors	Ms. Barnes	Short
1986	Agent on Ice	Mrs. Kirkpatrick	
1989	Dead Poets Society	Mrs. Anderson	
1994	Schemes	Ruby	Video
1995	Napoleon	Cat	Voice (U.S. Dub)
1997	Anastasia	Actress	Voice
2001	Domestic Disturbance	Theresa	
2010	The Last Godfather	Sister Theresa	
2016	Those Left Behind		
2017	We Don't Belong Here	Grandma	

=== Television ===
Year	Title	Role	Notes
1976	Delvecchio	Dr. Petrie	Episodes: "The Silent Prey", "APB: Santa Claus"
1983	The Cradle Will Fall	Vangie Lewis	TV film
1985	ABC Afterschool Special	Mrs. Anderson	Episode: "Don't Touch"
1989	Dream Street	Lillian DeBeau	Main role
1990	Roseanne	Mrs. Wellman	Episodes: "Hair", "I'm Hungry", "Fender Bender", "Happy Birthday"
1990	Empty Nest	Mrs. Bierman	Episode: "The Tortoise & the Harry"
1991	L.A. Law	Marsha Henderson	Episode: "The Gods Must Be Lawyers"
1991	Tales from the Crypt	Ellen	Episode: "Easel Kill Ya"
1991–92	Davis Rules	Mrs. Rush	Main role
1992	The Fresh Prince of Bel-Air	Nurse Petty	Episode: "Ill Will"
1993	Flying Blind	Joan	Episode: "The Long Goodbye"
1993	Seinfeld	Mrs. Sweedler	Episode: "The Bris"
1993	Grace Under Fire	Peg	Episode: "Grace in the Middle"
1993–94	Murphy Brown	Lee Larkin	Episodes: "Trickster, We Hardly Knew Ye", "Anything But Cured"
1994	Breathing Lessons	Mrs. Stuckey	TV film
1994	Herman's Head	Herman's Mother	Episode: "Bedtime for Hermo"
1994	The George Carlin Show	Rosemarie	Episode: "George Destroys a Way of Life"
1994	One West Waikiki	Sarah Gaines	Episode: "Along Came a Spider"
1994–95	Something Wilder	Mrs. Thornton	Episodes: "Holy Water", "Hanging with Mr. Cooper"
1995	Northern Exposure	Jane Stowe O'Connell	Episode: "The Mommy's Curse"
1995	Step by Step	Nurse Deckers	Episode: "One Truck, Al Dente"
1995	Pig Sty	Kasha	Episode: "Mr. Nice Guy"
1995	Party of Five	Gloria Metzler	Episode: "Brother's Keeper"
1995	Mad About You	Sister Dorothea	Episode: "Mad Without You"
1995–96	Kirk	Sally	Main role
1996	Sisters	Paulette Brown	Episode: "Taking a Gamble"
1996	Touched by an Angel	Mrs. Shaw	Episode: "Flesh and Blood"
1996	Champs	Prof. Carnovsky	Episode: "To Be There or Not to Be There"
1996	Ellen	Barbara	Episode: "Not So Great Expectations"
1996	Boston Common	Mrs. Taggert	Episode: "Coming Clean"
1997	The Naked Truth	Eleanor	Episode: "He Ain't Famous, He's My Brother"
1997	Caroline in the City	Eleanor Cassidy	Episode: "Caroline and the Decanter"
1998	House Rules	Mother Superior	Episode: "Twisted Sister"
1998	Maggie Winters	Idah	Episode: "Suburban Myth"
1999	Silk Hope	Violet	TV film
1999, 2009	ER	Leila Morgan, Barbara Feingold	Episodes: "Rites of Spring", "Getting to Know You", "Love Is a Battlefield"
2000	Will & Grace	Sister Robert	Episode: "Sweet (and Sour) Charity"
2000	Just Shoot Me!	Ellen Gelman	Episode: "Blinded by the Right"
2001	Judging Amy	Marjorie Landsdown	Episode: "Adoption Day"
2000–2003	The Practice	Judge P. Spindle	Guest role (seasons 4–6, 8)
2002	Philly	Brenda Pagano	Episode: "Lies of Minelli"
2002–03	Everybody Loves Raymond	Lee	Episodes: "The Skit", "Thank You Notes", "Home from School"
2002–2006	Everwood	Edna Harper	Main role
2004	Joan of Arcadia	Ruth Washington	Episode: "Silence"
2006	The Mermaid Chair	Kat	TV film
2006	The Closer	Elaine Donahue	Episodes: "Serving the King: Parts 1 & 2"
2007	Psych	Mrs. Lassiter	Episode: "Poker? I Barely Know Her"
2007	Private Practice	Sylvie	Episode: "In Which Addison Has a Very Casual Get Together"
2007–08	Boston Legal	Judge Patrice Webb	Episodes: "Nuts", "The Good Lawyer", "The Bride Wore Blood", "Rescue Me"
2008	Pushing Daisies	Callista Cod	Episode: "Frescorts"
2008	Cold Case	Betty Sue Baker	Episode: "Pin Up Girl"
2009	Eleventh Hour	Pete Hammer	Episode: "Pinocchio"
2009–10, 2015–2021, 2026	Grey's Anatomy	Evelyn Hunt	Guest role (seasons 5, 7, 11–12, 14–18, 22)
2010	Den Brother	Allie Jacklitz	TV film
2010	Hawthorne	Maureen	Episode: "No Exit"
2011	Bones	Allison Rose	Episode: "The Change in the Game"
2011	Weeds	Shelby Keene	Episodes: "Game-Played", "Synthetics"
2011	The Mentalist	Lydia Bibb	Episode: "Blood and Sand"
2012–13	The Neighbors	Theresa Weaver	Episodes: "Thanksgiving Is for the Bird-Kersees", "Thanksgiving Is No Schmuck Bait"
2012–13, 2017	Scandal	Verna Thornton	Recurring role (season 2), guest (season 6)
2013	Save Me	Ruby	Episode: "WWJD"
2013	Jodi Arias: Dirty Little Secret	Caroline	TV film
2013, 2018	Arrested Development	Joan Bark	Guest role (seasons 4–5)
2014	Parks and Recreation	Rosie Demarco	Episode: "Anniversaries"
2014	Intelligence	Mary Vaughn	Episode: "Being Human"
2014	Rake	Dorothy Copely	Episode: "Mammophile"
2015, 2017	The Originals	Mary Dumas	Recurring role (seasons 2 & 4), guest (season 3)
2016	Chance	Dr. Myra Cohen	Episodes: "Camera Obscura", "Fluid Management"
2016	The Death of Sofia Valdez	Clara	TV film
2017	This Is Us	Mrs. Peabody	Episode: "Moonshadow"
2020	Batwoman	Mabel Cartwright	Episode: "Off With Her Head"
2021	Grace and Frankie	Judge Mcavoy	Episode: "The Arraignment"
2022	Inventing Anna	Judge	Episodes: "Life of a VIP", “Cash on Delivery”, “Dangerously Close”
2024	Walker	Maybelline	Episodes: "Maybe it’s Maybelline"
2025	Doctor Odyssey	June	Episodes: "Casino Week"

== Theater ==
Year	Title	Role	Notes
1972	Fiddler on the Roof		
1972	A Streetcar Named Desire	Blanche DuBois	
1975	The Farm		
1977	Chapter Two	Faye Medwick / Jennie Malone	Replacement Broadway debut
1980	Talley's Folly	Sally Talley	Replacement
1984	Death of a Salesman	Linda	Understudy
1985	The Odd Couple	Mickey	Replacement
1986	The Perfect Party	Sally	
1989	The Sum of Us	Joyce	
1992	The Price	Esther Franz	
1998	Getting and Spending	Mary Phillips	
