= Only When I Laugh (film) =

1981 film by Glenn Jordan

- Only When I Laugh theatrical poster
- Directed by: Glenn Jordan
- Screenplay by: Neil Simon
- Based on: The Gingerbread Lady by Neil Simon
- Produced by: Neil Simon; Roger M. Rothstein
- Starring: Marsha Mason; Kristy McNichol; James Coco; Joan Hackett; David Dukes
- Cinematography: David M. Walsh
- Edited by: John Wright
- Music by: David Shire
- Production company: Rastar
- Distributed by: Columbia Pictures
- Release date: September 23, 1981
- Running time: 120 minutes
- Country: United States
- Language: English
- Box office: $25,524,778

Only When I Laugh is a 1981 American comedy-drama film based on Neil Simon's 1970 play The Gingerbread Lady.

The story is about alcoholic Broadway actress Georgia Hines who reenters society after a long stay in a rehab clinic. As she tries to stay sober there are the triple responsibilities of raising her estranged teenaged daughter Polly, getting a new acting role and maintaining her co-dependent relations with two close friends; Toby Landau, a wealthy, vain socialite who fears the loss of her youthful looks, and Jimmy Perrino, a gay, middle-aged actor who is frequently relegated to small roles in third-rate stage plays.

Simon changed the main character's name to Georgia Hines for the film adaptation; the character was named Evy Meara in the stage version. The main character went from being a cabaret singer to a Broadway stage actress.

The film, written by Simon and directed by Glenn Jordan, stars Marsha Mason, Joan Hackett, James Coco, and Kristy McNichol. It also features two short scenes with then-unknowns Kevin Bacon and John Vargas. Simon's next release, I Ought to Be in Pictures, was released just six months later, and its plot was similar.

It was nominated for Academy Awards for Best Actress in a Leading Role (Marsha Mason), Best Actor in a Supporting Role (James Coco), and Best Actress in a Supporting Role (Joan Hackett). Only When I Laugh proved to be very successful at the box office. Hackett would go on to win the Golden Globe Award for Best Supporting Actress - Motion Picture, while Coco was also nominated for the Golden Raspberry Award for Worst Supporting Actor for his role.

== Plot ==
Actress Georgia Hines is released from alcohol rehab and returns to her Manhattan apartment and her friends: Jimmy Perrino, a gay unemployed actor, and Toby Landau, a sophisticated socialite. She says she will maintain her sobriety and slowly ease back into theatre work. Georgia's teenaged daughter Polly, who has been living with her father and her new stepmother Felicia, asks if she could move in with her mother. Georgia agrees.

Georgia receives a phone call from her ex-lover, writer David Lowe, who asks if they can meet. At dinner, David presents his new script, based on their turbulent, alcohol-filled relationship. He wants Georgia to play the lead/herself. She eventually agrees. Georgia shines in rehearsals. When she confuses art with life during a scene and loses her composure, David consoles her and says that she is the only one who can do this part, kissing her on the cheek as he exits.

Meanwhile, Jimmy is given a part in another play. At her own rehearsals, Georgia brings David a gift-wrapped present. David is taken aback, then introduces Georgia to his new girlfriend Denise Summers. Georgia realizes that David's affections towards her were only as a friend. She then learns that Toby's husband has just asked for a divorce. Devastated for Toby, the circle of friends agrees to meet at her place that evening.

Georgia is greeted at the door by an impeccably dressed Toby. Georgia keeps refilling Toby's champagne glass while Toby reminisces about life as an enviable college beauty, an untalented actress, and then a perfect wife. Toby's composure crumbles and when she excuses herself to retouch her makeup, Georgia answers the door to a shaking Jimmy. He starts downing champagne and reveals that he was fired from his play, three nights before the opening. Georgia retreats to the kitchen and proceeds to drink multiple glasses of champagne. She returns to the room tipsy and tries to rally her friends, who are shocked after realizing she has started drinking again.

Polly, unaware of events, arrives at Toby's with her new boyfriend Jason. The three friends form a plan to conceal their problems from Polly, but Georgia, now very drunk, has an over-the-top reaction to Polly and Jason. Polly realizes that Georgia has relapsed, and that Toby and Jimmy are back to covering up for her. She scolds Georgia for her insensitive attitude towards everyone around her, then storms out with Jason.

Jimmy gets Georgia home, where she insists that Jimmy can trust her to be by herself. After he leaves, Georgia goes out to buy cigarettes at a neighborhood bar, but then sits down to start drinking and strikes up a flirty conversation with a stranger. When Georgia leaves, the stranger follows, drags her into an alley and beats her up.

A battered Georgia makes it to Toby's, but begs her not to call the police. While Toby tends to Georgia's wounded face, Georgia continues to drink. When Toby tries to make her see how self-destructive she has become, Georgia lashes out and mocks her. A furious Toby expresses that she has had it covering for Georgia, telling her to do everyone a favor and stop being such an “astronomical pain in the ass”. The two friends share a laugh and reconcile.

The next morning, Polly tries to convince Georgia to meet for lunch at Tavern on the Green with the father to discuss divided parental responsibilities, but Georgia circumnavigates the subject using the injury as excuse and eventually refuses. Georgia admits to Polly that she is not ready to handle the responsibilities of caring for another person. Polly feels rejected, again, by her mother's decision. After Polly moves out, Georgia starts to accept Jimmy's consoling when she realizes that she uses her friends to enable her behavior. Georgia later meets Polly and Polly's father for lunch.

== Cast ==
- Marsha Mason as Georgia Hines
- Kristy McNichol as Polly Hines
- James Coco as Jimmy Perrino
- Joan Hackett as Toby Landau
- David Dukes as David Lowe
- John Bennett Perry as Vincent Heller
- Guy Boyd as Man in Bar
- Peter Coffield as Mr. Tarloff
- Ed Moore as Dr. Bob Komack
- Byron Webster as Tom
- Henry Olek as Dave
- Mark Schubb as Adam Kasabian
- Venida Evans as Nurse Garcia
- John Vargas as Manuel
- Dan Monahan as Jason
- Jane Atkins as Doreen
- Kevin Bacon as Don Holcroft
- Rebecca Stanley as Denise Summers
- Phillip Lindsay as Building Super

== Reception ==
Roger Ebert gave the film one star out of four and wrote, "The only genuine moments amid the phony landscapes of this film come from Kristy McNichol, who turns in a wonderful performance as Mason's daughter. McNichol carries conviction. She suggests the real passions and hurts that her character must feel. The other people in the movie seem to be drawn from superficial medical advice columns, advice for the lovelorn, and the character insights of popular songs." Gene Siskel of the Chicago Tribune also awarded it one star out of four and wrote, "The script by Neil Simon is as phony as can be, with only McNichol giving any credibility to her character. The film would like to be funny and poignant, and it is neither." Vincent Canby of The New York Times was positive, writing that "Mr. Simon's screenplay is also one of his best, and it's been treated with care by Glenn Jordan, a television director whose first theatrical film this is." Canby found the performances "excellent" with the exception of McNichol, whom he faulted for playing her role "in that triply unreal manner of an adult actress imitating an old-time Hollywood child actress imitating an adult actress." Variety praised a "bravura performance" from McNichol and added, "Glenn Jordan's economic direction is sensitively tuned to the border-treading emotions that populate the film, and manages to almost completely skirt the danger of hackneyed treatment this hardly virgin territory might easily have provoked." Kevin Thomas of the Los Angeles Times called the film "sleekly entertaining, well-produced (in part by Simon himself, a first for him) and a worthy successor to The Goodbye Girl and Chapter Two. David Ansen of Newsweek stated, "Functioning for the first time as his own film producer, Simon made a wise choice in TV director Glenn Jordan. The pathos and the wisecracks don't come at you with the usual relentlessness. Jordan gives both the audience and his excellent cast room to breathe and neatly keeps things just off the brink of overbearing melodrama."

Only When I Laugh holds a 63% rating on Rotten Tomatoes based on eight reviews.

== Awards and nominations ==
James Coco became the first performer in history to be nominated for an Academy Award and a Golden Raspberry Award (as of its 1980 inception) for the same performance, for Supporting Actor. Since then, Amy Irving and Glenn Close have also achieved this same feat for their performances in Yentl (1983) and Hillbilly Elegy (2020), respectively, each in Supporting Actress.

Award	Category	Nominee(s)	Result
Academy Awards	Best Actress	Marsha Mason	Nominated
Academy Awards	Best Supporting Actor	James Coco	Nominated
Academy Awards	Best Supporting Actress	Joan Hackett	Nominated
Golden Globe Awards	Best Supporting Actor – Motion Picture	James Coco	Nominated
Golden Globe Awards	Best Supporting Actress – Motion Picture	Joan Hackett	Won
Golden Globe Awards	Best Supporting Actress – Motion Picture	Kristy McNichol	Nominated
Golden Raspberry Awards	Worst Supporting Actor	James Coco	Nominated
Golden Raspberry Awards	Worst Original Song	"Only When I Laugh"; Music by David Shire; Lyrics by Richard Maltby Jr.	Nominated
Young Artist Awards	Best Motion Picture – Family Enjoyment		Nominated
Young Artist Awards	Best Leading Young Actress in a Feature Film	Kristy McNichol	Won

== Home media ==
The film is available for streaming rental and digital download through Apple's iTunes Store and Amazon Video. Originally released on Laserdisc, CED Videodisc, and both VHS and Betamax videocassettes, the film is now available on DVD through Amazon via Columbia/Sony's manufacture-on-demand (MOD) business.
