= Eileen Brennan =

American actress and singer (1932–2013)

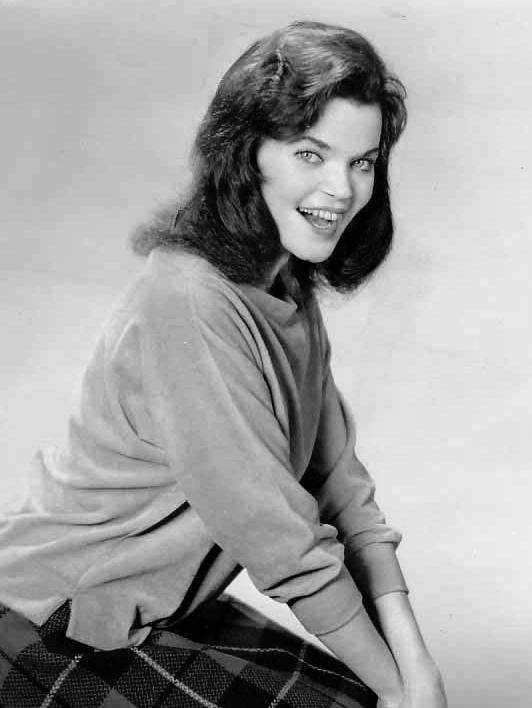
- Brennan in 1963
- Born: Verla Eileen Regina Brennen; September 3, 1932; Los Angeles, California, U.S.
- Died: July 28, 2013 (aged 80); Burbank, California, U.S.
- Education: Georgetown University; American Academy of Dramatic Arts
- Occupation: Actress
- Years active: 1960–2011
- Known for: The Last Picture Show; Private Benjamin; Clue; Murder by Death; The Cheap Detective; The Sting
- Spouse: David John Lampson (m. 1968; div. 1974)
- Children: 2; including Patrick Brennan
- Awards: Golden Globe Award for Best Actress - Television Series Musical or Comedy; Primetime Emmy Award for Outstanding Supporting Actress in a Comedy Series

Eileen Brennan (born Verla Eileen Regina Brennen; September 3, 1932 – July 28, 2013) was an American actress. She made her film debut in the satire Divorce American Style (1967), followed by a supporting role in Peter Bogdanovich's The Last Picture Show (1971), which earned her a BAFTA Award nomination for Best Supporting Actress. She gained further critical acclaim for her role as Captain Doreen Lewis in Private Benjamin (1980), earning an Oscar nomination for Best Supporting Actress. She reprised the role in the television adaptation, winning both a Golden Globe and a Primetime Emmy Award.

Brennan starred opposite Peter Falk in two Neil Simon-penned murder mystery spoofs: Murder by Death (1976) and The Cheap Detective (1978). She also appeared in the ensemble cast of the mystery-comedy Clue (1985) which gained a major cult following. She worked prolifically in television, receiving Emmy nominations for her guest roles on Newhart, Thirtysomething, Taxi, and Will & Grace.

== Early life ==
Verla Eileen Regina Brennen was born September 3, 1932, in Los Angeles, California, to Regina Menehan, a former silent film actress, and John Gerald Brennen, a doctor.

After graduating from high school in California, Brennan moved to Washington, D.C., to attend Georgetown University, where she was a member of the Mask and Bauble Society. She later relocated to New York City to attend the American Academy of Dramatic Arts, where she was the roommate of Rue McClanahan.

== Career ==
=== Early work and theatre ===
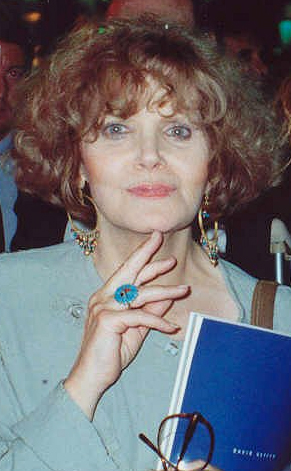
Brennan in 1990

Brennan began her acting career while attending university, appearing in Georgetown's stage productions of Arsenic and Old Lace. Her exceptional comic skills and romantic soprano voice propelled her from unknown to star in the title role of Rick Besoyan's off-Broadway tongue-in-cheek musical/operetta Little Mary Sunshine (1959), earning Brennan an Obie Award, and its unofficial sequel The Student Gypsy (1963), on Broadway.

She played Annie Sullivan in The Miracle Worker at the 1961 Central City Opera Summer Festival in Central City, Colorado directed by Arthur Penn, who had just won a Tony for his direction of the play on Broadway. She went on to create the role of Irene Molloy in the original Broadway production of Hello, Dolly! (1964).

Brennan's work in theatre attracted attention from television producers in California. Carl Reiner, who was seeking an actress to play the role of Laura Petrie on The Dick Van Dyke Show, flew her from New York to Los Angeles to audition for the part; however, the role was given to Mary Tyler Moore.

=== Transition to film ===
Her feature-film debut was in Divorce American Style (1967). She soon became one of the most recognizable supporting actresses in film and television. She usually played sympathetic characters, though she played a variety of other character types, including earthy, vulgar and sassy, but occasionally "with a heart of gold". A year after her feature-film debut, she became a semi-regular on the comedy-variety show Rowan & Martin's Laugh-In, but stayed for only two months. Brennan also appeared in the Barnaby Jones episode titled "Blood Relations" (1975).

Brennan became a favorite of a number of directors, in particular Peter Bogdanovich. She appeared in Bogdanovich's drama The Last Picture Show as Genevieve (1971), for which she received a BAFTA nomination for best supporting actress.

In 1972, Brennan appeared in an All in the Family episode, "The Elevator Story" (1972), as Angelique McCarthy, followed by a role in George Roy Hill's Academy Award-winning film The Sting (1973) as Billie, the brothel madam and confidante of con man Henry Gondorf (Paul Newman). In 1974, she reunited with director Bogdanovich, appearing in his adaptation of the Henry James novella Daisy Miller. Bogdanovich was the only director who made use of her musical talents (save for The Cheap Detective; and she sang in performances off Broadway) when he cast her as Cybill Shepherd's crude, fun-loving maid in his musical flop At Long Last Love (1975) (which also starred Madeline Kahn; Brennan and Kahn worked together in two more films: The Cheap Detective (1978) and Clue (1985).

Brennan also worked with director Robert Moore and writer Neil Simon, appearing in Murder by Death as Tess Skeffington (1976) and also appearing in The Cheap Detective (1978). Both of these movies also starred James Coco, James Cromwell and Peter Falk. She had a starring role, playing the disc jockey Mother in the film FM (1978), a comedy-drama about life at a rock-music radio station.

In 1980, Brennan received a Best Supporting Actress Oscar nomination for her role as Goldie Hawn's nasty commanding officer in Private Benjamin. She reprised the role in the television adaptation (1981–1983), for which she won an Emmy (supporting actress) as well as a Golden Globe (lead actress). She had one additional Golden Globe nomination and six Emmy nominations. Brennan received an Emmy nomination for her guest-star role in the Taxi episode "Thy Boss's Wife" (1981).

In 1985, Brennan portrayed the iconic Mrs. Peacock in the Paramount Pictures adaptation of Clue.

=== Later roles ===
Brennan guest-starred on two Murder, She Wrote episodes, "Old Habits Die Hard" (1987) and "Dear Deadly" (1994), and in 1987, she also appeared in the Magnum, P.I. episode "The Love That Lies". Other guest appearances included Newhart, Thirtysomething, Home Improvement, Walker, Texas Ranger and ER, the first two of which garnered her Emmy nominations. In the 1990s, she appeared in Stella (1990) with Bette Midler, Bogdanovich's Texasville (1990, the sequel to The Last Picture Show), and Reckless (1995). She had a recurring role on the sitcom Blossom as the neighbor/confidante of the title character. She also appeared opposite Vincent D'Onofrio in a segment of Boys Life 2, an anthology film about gay men in America.

In 2001, she made a brief appearance in the horror movie Jeepers Creepers, and the following year starred in the dark comedy film Comic Book Villains, with DJ Qualls. Around that time, Brennan had also guest-starred on television, including recurring roles as the nosy Mrs. Bink on 7th Heaven and as gruff-acting coach Zandra on Will & Grace. In 2003, director Shawn Levy cast her in a cameo role as a babysitter to Steve Martin and Bonnie Hunt's children in an updated remake of Cheaper by the Dozen. Levy was inspired to cast Brennan after seeing Private Benjamin on television. However, Brennan's cameo was deleted from the actual cut of the movie. Nonetheless, she did receive credit for her role on the deleted scenes special feature of the film's DVD. In 2004, she appeared in the horror film The Hollow as Joan Van Etten. That same year, Brennan was nominated for an Emmy for her performance as Zandra, Jack McFarland's caustic drama teacher, on Will & Grace.

== Personal life ==
From 1968 to 1974, Brennan was married to British poet and photographer David John Lampson, with whom she had two sons: Patrick, a former basketball player turned actor, and Sam, a singer.

In 1982, Brennan was hit by a passing car in Venice Beach while leaving a restaurant with Goldie Hawn and suffered massive injuries. She took two years off work to recover and had to overcome a subsequent addiction to painkillers. She also fell from the stage in 1989 during a production of Annie, breaking a leg. The following year, she was diagnosed with breast cancer, for which she was successfully treated.

== Death ==
Brennan died at her home in Burbank, California, on July 28, 2013, of bladder cancer, aged 80. Her Private Benjamin co-star Goldie Hawn said she was a "brilliant comedian, a powerful dramatic actress and had the voice of an angel". Actor, writer and director Michael McKean, Brennan's co-star in Clue, called Brennan "a brilliant actress, a tough and tender woman and a comic angel".

== Filmography ==
=== Film ===
Year	Title	Role	Notes
1967	Divorce American Style	Eunice Tase	
1971	The Last Picture Show	Genevieve	Nominated—BAFTA Award for Best Actress in a Supporting Role
1973	Scarecrow	Darlene	
1973	The Blue Knight	Glenda	Television film
1973	The Sting	Billie	
1974	Nourish the Beast	Baba Goya	Television Film
1974	Daisy Miller	Mrs. Walker	
1975	At Long Last Love	Elizabeth	
1975	Hustle	Paula Hollinger	
1976	Murder by Death	Tess Skeffington	
1977	The Death of Richie	Carol Werner	Television film
1977	The Great Smokey Roadblock	Penelope Pearson	
1978	FM	Mother	
1978	The Cheap Detective	Betty DeBoop	
1979	When She Was Bad...	Mary Jensen	Television film
1979	My Old Man	Marie	Television film
1980	Private Benjamin	Captain Doreen Lewis	Nominated—Academy Award for Best Supporting Actress
1981	Incident at Crestridge	Sara Davis	
1981	When the Circus Came to Town	Jessy	Television film
1982	Pandemonium	Candy's mom	
1983	The Funny Farm	Gail Corbin	
1985	Clue	Mrs. Peacock	
1986	Babes in Toyland	Ms. Piper / Widow Hubbard	
1988	The New Adventures of Pippi Longstocking	Miss Bannister	Nominated—Razzie Award for Worst Supporting Actress
1988	Sticky Fingers	Stella	
1988	Rented Lips	Hotel Desk Clerk	
1988	Going to the Chapel	Maude	
1989	It Had to Be You	Judith	
1990	Stella	Mrs. Wilkerson	
1990	Texasville	Genevieve Morgan	
1990	White Palace	Judy	
1991	Joey Takes a Cab		
1992	I Don't Buy Kisses Anymore	Frieda	
1994	In Search of Dr. Seuss	Who-Villain	Television film
1995	Reckless	Sister Margaret	
1996	If These Walls Could Talk	Tessie	Segment "1996"
1997	Boys Life 2	Mrs. Randozza	(segment "Nunzio's Second Cousin")
1997	Changing Habits	Mother Superior	
1998	Pants on Fire	Mom	
1999	The Last Great Ride	Pamela Mimi Mackensie	
2000	Moonglow		
2001	Jeepers Creepers	The Cat Lady	
2002	Comic Book Villains	Miss Cresswell	
2003	Dumb Luck	Minnie Hitchcock	
2003	Cheaper by the Dozen	Mrs. Drucker	Scenes deleted
2004	The Hollow	Ms. Etta	
2005	Miss Congeniality 2: Armed and Fabulous	Carol Fields	
2009	The Kings of Appletown	Coach's blind mother	
2010	Naked Run	Gram Malone	

=== Television ===
Year 1966	Title The Star Wagon	Role Hallie	Notes
1967	NET Playhouse	Unknown	Episode: "Infancy and Childhood"
1968	Rowan and Martin's Laugh-In	Performer	12 episodes
1970	The Ghost and Mrs. Muir	Paula Tardy	Episode: "Ladies' Man"
1970	The Most Deadly Game	Alice	Episode: "Photo Finish"
1972	All in the Family	Angelique McCarthy	Episode: "The Elevator Story"
1972	McMillan & Wife	Dora	Episode: "Night of the Wizard"
1973	Jigsaw	Unknown	Episode: "In Case of an Emergency, Notify Clint Eastwood"
1975	Barnaby Jones	Anita Willson	Episode: "Blood Relations"
1975	Kojak	Julie Loring	Episode: "A House of Prayer, a Den of Thieves"
1975	Insight	Carol Harris	Episode: "The Prodigal Father"
1979	13 Queens Boulevard	Felicia Winters	9 episodes
1979–1980	A New Kind of Family	Kit Flanagan	11 episodes
1981	Taxi	Mrs. McKenzie	Episode: "Thy Boss's Wife"; Nominated—Primetime Emmy Award for Outstanding Lead Actress in a Comedy Series
1981–1983	Private Benjamin	Captain Doreen Lewis	37 episodes Golden Globe Award for Best Actress – Television Series Musical or Comedy; Primetime Emmy Award for Outstanding Supporting Actress in a Comedy Series; Nominated—Golden Globe Award for Best Actress – Television Series Musical or Comedy; Nominated—Primetime Emmy Award for Outstanding Supporting Actress in a Comedy Series (1982-1983)
1982	American Playhouse	Millworker	Episode: "Working"
1984	The Love Boat	Helen Foster	2 episodes
1984–1985	Off the Rack	Kate Hollaran	7 episodes
1987	Magnum, P.I.	Brenda Babcock	Episode: "The Love That Lies"
1987 1994	Murder, She Wrote	Mariam Simpson Loretta Lee	Episode: "Old Habits Die Hard" "Dear Deadly"
1988	CBS Summer Playhouse	Sioban Owens	Episode: "Off Duty"
1988–1989	Newhart	Corinne Denby	2 episodes Nominated—Primetime Emmy Award for Outstanding Guest Actress in a Comedy Series
1990	The Ray Bradbury Theater	Mrs. Annabelle Shrike	Episode: "Touched with Fire"
1991	Blossom	Agnes	3 episodes
1991	Thirtysomething	Margaret Weston	Episode: "Sifting the Ashes"; Nominated—Primetime Emmy Award for Outstanding Guest Actress in a Drama Series
1992	Home Improvement	Wanda	Episode: "Heavy Meddle"
1993	Tribeca	Claudia	Episode: "Stepping Back"
1993	Jack's Place	Dina	Episode: "The Hands of Time"
1993	Bonkers	Lilith DuPrave	4 episodes
1993	Tales from the Crypt	Ruth Sanderson	Episode: "Til Death Do We Part"
1993	All-New Dennis the Menace	Voice	13 episodes
1994	Murder, She Wrote	Loretta Lee	Episode: "Dear Deadly"
1995	Walker, Texas Ranger	Joelle	Episode: "Mean Streets"
1995	Thunder Alley	Irma	Episode: "Are We There Yet?"
1996	ER	Betty	2 episodes
1996–2006	7th Heaven	Gladys Bink	9 episodes
1997	Veronica's Closet	Grammy Anderson	Episode: "Veronica's First Thanksgiving"
1998	Nash Bridges	Loretta Bettina	Episode: "Downtime"
1998	Mad About You	Inspector No. 10	Episode: "Cheating on Sheila"
1999	Touched by an Angel	Dolores	Episode: "The Last Day of the Rest of Your Life"
2000	The Fearing Mind	Irene's mother	Episode: "Gentleman Caller"
2001–2006	Will & Grace	Zandra	6 episodes Nominated—Primetime Emmy Award for Outstanding Guest Actress in a Comedy Series
2003	Lizzie McGuire	Marge	Episode: "My Fair Larry"
2003	Strong Medicine	Evelyn Knightly	Episode: "Coming Clean"

== Awards and nominations ==
Institution	Year	Category	Work	Results
Theatre World Award	1960	Theatre World Award	Little Mary Sunshine	Won
BAFTA Award	1973	Best Supporting Actress	The Last Picture Show	Nominated
Primetime Emmy Awards	1981	Outstanding Supporting Actress in a Comedy Series	Private Benjamin	Won
Primetime Emmy Awards	1981	Outstanding Lead Actress in a Comedy Series	Taxi	Nominated
Primetime Emmy Awards	1982	Outstanding Supporting Actress in a Comedy Series	Private Benjamin	Nominated
Primetime Emmy Awards	1983	Outstanding Supporting Actress in a Comedy Series	Private Benjamin	Nominated
Primetime Emmy Awards	1989	Outstanding Guest Actress in a Comedy Series	Newhart	Nominated
Primetime Emmy Awards	1991	Outstanding Guest Actress in a Drama Series	Thirtysomething	Nominated
Primetime Emmy Awards	2004	Outstanding Guest Actress in a Comedy Series	Will & Grace	Nominated
Academy Awards	1981	Best Supporting Actress	Private Benjamin	Nominated
Golden Globe Awards	1982	Best Actress in a Comedy Series	Private Benjamin	Won
Golden Globe Awards	1983	Best Actress in a Comedy Series	Private Benjamin	Nominated
CableACE Awards	1985	Best Actress in a Theatrical Drama or Special	Answers	Nominated
Razzie Awards	1989	Worst Supporting Actress	The New Adventures of Pippi Longstocking	Nominated
