= David M. Walsh =

American cinematographer (born 1931)

- Born: 23 July 1931 (age 94); Cumberland, Maryland, U.S.
- Occupation: Cinematographer
- Years active: 1955–2004
- Awards: Primetime Emmy award

David Martin Walsh (born July 23, 1931) is an American cinematographer. He worked with film directors including Woody Allen, Herbert Ross, and Arthur Hiller.

Walsh started working in 1955 as an assistant animation cameraman at The Walt Disney Studios. During the 1960s, he worked as a camera operator on numerous big-budget features.

Walsh won Primetime Emmy Award Outstanding Achievement in Cinematography for Entertainment Programming for a Special for Queen of the Stardust Ballroom in 1975.

== Filmography ==
Director of photography

=== Film ===
Year	Film	Director	Notes
1970	Monte Walsh	William A. Fraker	
1970	I Walk the Line	John Frankenheimer	
1971	Cactus in the Snow	A. Martin Zweiback	
1971	Evel Knievel	Marvin J. Chomsky	
1971	A Gunfight	Lamont Johnson	
1972	Corky	Leonard Horn	
1972	Hot Summer Week	Thomas J. Schmidt	
1972	Everything You Always Wanted to Know About Sex* (*But Were Afraid to Ask)	Woody Allen	First collaboration with Woody Allen
1973	Ace Eli and Rodger of the Skies	John Erman	First collaboration with John Erman
1973	Cleopatra Jones	Jack Starrett	
1973	Sleeper	Woody Allen	Second collaboration with Woody Allen
1973	The Laughing Policeman	Stuart Rosenberg	
1974	The Crazy World of Julius Vrooder	Arthur Hiller	First collaboration with Arthur Hiller
1975	The Other Side of the Mountain	Larry Peerce	
1975	Whiffs	Ted Post	
1975	The Sunshine Boys	Herbert Ross	First collaboration with Herbert Ross
1976	W. C. Fields and Me	Arthur Hiller	Second collaboration with Arthur Hiller
1976	Murder by Death	Robert Moore	First collaboration with Robert Moore
1976	Silver Streak	Arthur Hiller	Third collaboration with Arthur Hiller
1977	Scott Joplin	Jeremy Kagan	
1977	Rollercoaster	James Goldstone	
1977	The Goodbye Girl	Herbert Ross	Second collaboration with Herbert Ross
1978	House Calls	Howard Zieff	First collaboration with Howard Zieff
1978	Foul Play	Colin Higgins	
1978	California Suite	Herbert Ross	Third collaboration with Herbert Ross
1979	The In-Laws	Arthur Hiller	Fourth collaboration with Arthur Hiller
1979	Just You and Me, Kid	Leonard B. Stern	
1979	Chapter Two	Robert Moore	Second collaboration with Robert Moore
1980	Hero at Large	Martin Davidson	
1980	Private Benjamin	Howard Zieff	Second collaboration with Howard Zieff
1980	Seems Like Old Times	Jay Sandrich	
1981	Only When I Laugh	Glenn Jordan	
1982	Making Love	Arthur Hiller	Fifth collaboration with Arthur Hiller
1982	I Ought to Be in Pictures	Herbert Ross	Fourth collaboration with Herbert Ross
1983	Max Dugan Returns	Herbert Ross	Fifth collaboration with Herbert Ross
1983	Romantic Comedy	Arthur Hiller	Sixth collaboration with Arthur Hiller
1984	Unfaithfully Yours	Howard Zieff	Third collaboration with Howard Zieff
1984	Country	Richard Pearce	
1984	Teachers	Arthur Hiller	Seventh collaboration with Arthur Hiller
1984	Johnny Dangerously	Amy Heckerling	
1985	My Science Project	Jonathan R. Betuel	
1987	Outrageous Fortune	Arthur Hiller	Eighth collaboration with Arthur Hiller
1987	Summer School	Carl Reiner	
1987	Fatal Beauty	Tom Holland	
1990	Taking Care of Business	Arthur Hiller	Ninth collaboration with Arthur Hiller
1992	Brain Donors	Dennis Dugan	
1996	Carpool	Arthur Hiller	Tenth collaboration with Arthur Hiller

Camera and electrical department

Year	Film	Director	Role	Notes
1963	Wives and Lovers	John Rich	Assistant camera operator	Uncredited
1965	The Hallelujah Trail	John Sturges	Assistant camera	Uncredited
1966	An Eye for an Eye	Michael D. Moore	Camera operator	
1967	The President's Analyst	Theodore J. Flicker	Camera operator	
1968	Bullitt	Peter Yates	Camera operator	Uncredited
1969	Paint Your Wagon	Joshua Logan	Camera operator	
1969	The Reivers	Mark Rydell	Camera operator	
1990	Stella	John Erman	Additional photographer	Second collaboration with John Erman
1991	F/X2	Richard Franklin	Director of photography: Los Angeles	
1991	What About Bob?	Frank Oz	Additional photographer	
1994	Clifford	Paul Flaherty	Director of photography: Special photography unit	

=== Shorts ===
Year	Film	Director
1989	Private Debts	Nancy Cooperstein
1989	Cranium Command	Gary Trousdale; Jerry Rees; Kirk Wise

=== TV movies ===
Year	Film	Director	Notes
1971	Suddenly Single	Jud Taylor	
1973	A Brand New Life	Sam O'Steen	
1974	Tell Me Where It Hurts	Paul Bogart	
1974	Born Innocent	Donald Wrye	
1975	Queen of the Stardust Ballroom	Sam O'Steen	
1975	My Father's House	Alex Segal	
1976	Woman of the Year	Jud Taylor	
1976	Street Killing	Harvey Hart	
1977	Never Con a Killer	Buzz Kulik	Uncredited
1994	Terror in the Night	Colin Bucksey	
2004	Back When We Were Grownups	Ron Underwood	
