= Chapter Two (film) =

1979 film by Robert Moore

- Theatrical release poster
- Directed by: Robert Moore
- Written by: Neil Simon
- Based on: Chapter Two; 1978 play by Neil Simon
- Produced by: Ray Stark
- Starring: James Caan; Marsha Mason; Valerie Harper; Joseph Bologna
- Cinematography: David M. Walsh
- Edited by: Michael A. Stevenson
- Music by: Marvin Hamlisch
- Production company: Rastar
- Distributed by: Columbia Pictures
- Release date: December 14, 1979
- Running time: 124 min.
- Country: United States
- Language: English
- Budget: $9-10 million
- Box office: $30 million

Chapter Two is a 1979 American Metrocolor romantic comedy-drama film directed by Robert Moore, produced by Ray Stark, and based on Neil Simon's 1977 Broadway play of the same name. It stars James Caan and Marsha Mason, in an Academy Award-nominated performance, as a widower and divorcée, respectively, who enter into a whirlwind marriage but soon find themselves questioning the entire relationship.

== Plot ==
George Schneider is an author living in New York City; his hours are occupied by his work, softball games in the park, and visits from his married brother Leo, a press agent who has been trying to introduce widower George to eligible women. George's emotions are still raw from the death of his wife, and he continues to be reminded of her.

George is given the phone number of a Jennie MacLaine, an actress Leo recently met through his friend Faye Medwick, and dials it accidentally while intending to call someone else. After an awkward exchange, he repeatedly phones Jennie to explain why he called, even though she makes it clear that she, too, has no interest in a blind date. George's persistence results in her accepting his proposal of a "five-minute" date, face-to-face. If that does not go well, he promises to leave her alone.

They meet at her apartment and immediately hit it off. Jennie is recently divorced from a professional football player. George explains how Leo has set him up on a number of disastrous dates, so he now finds himself pleasantly surprised to be with someone like her. George asks her for a traditional date, she accepts, and their whirlwind romance begins.

Leo is pleased and so is Faye, whose own marriage is on the rocks. To their astonishment, George and Jennie decide to get married after knowing each other only a brief time. Leo feels his brother is going much too fast. Faye asks to use Jennie's apartment while the couple is away on their honeymoon.

An idyllic trip to the Caribbean follows and George and Jennie are very happy, at least until another tourist who recognizes him extends condolences about George's deceased wife. He immediately sinks into a depression that continues through their return to New York. At his home, Jennie's attempts to cheer up George are met with curt responses and insults. She returns to her own apartment to discover that Faye is having an affair there with Leo.

The marriage appears to be over almost as quickly as it began. George comes to his senses just in time, realizing how much he loves Jennie and how he does not want to lose her.

== Cast ==
- James Caan as George Schneider
- Marsha Mason as Jennie MacLaine
- Joseph Bologna as Leo Schneider
- Valerie Harper as Faye Medwick
- Alan Fudge as Lee Michaels
- Judy Farrell as Gwen Michaels
- Debra Mooney as Marilyn
- Isabel Cooley as Customs Officer
- Imogene Bliss as Elderly Lady in Bookstore
- Barry Michlin as Maitre d'
- Ray Young as Gary
- Greg Zadikov as Waiter
- Paul Singh as Waiter (as Dr. Paul Singh)
- Sumant as Waiter
- Cheryl Bianchi as Electric Girl

== Production ==
An adaptation of a semi-autobiographical play by director-dramatist Neil Simon, the story conveys the coping and coupling of George, a recently widowed writer (played by James Caan), who is introduced by his press agent brother to Jennie, a just-divorced actress. Both are uncertain of whether to start dating so soon and George has recurring memories of his deceased wife. Jennie is portrayed by Simon's then-wife Marsha Mason, the inspiration for the character. Caan said he made the film to earn some money while preparing to direct the 1980 film Hide in Plain Sight.

The film was the fourth collaboration between Simon, producer Stark and Columbia Pictures after Murder By Death (1976), The Cheap Detective (1978) and California Suite (1978). The film started production July 23, 1979.

== Release ==
=== Box office performance ===
The film was a financial hit. It grossed $30 million at the domestic box office, making it the 27th highest-grossing film of 1979.

=== Critical reception ===
Chapter Two received mixed reviews from critics. On Rotten Tomatoes the film holds a 50% rating, based on reviews from eight critics, with an average rating of 5.3/10.

Roger Ebert of the Chicago Sun-Times awarded the film two out of four stars, writing "Chapter Two is called a comedy, maybe because that's what we expect from Neil Simon. It's not, although it has that comic subplot. It's a middlebrow, painfully earnest, overwritten exercise in pop sociology. I'm not exactly happy describing Neil Simon's semi-real-life in those terms, but then those are the terms in which he's chosen to present it. My notion is that Simon would have been wiser to imagine himself writing about another couple, and writing for another actress than his own wife; that way, maybe he wouldn't have felt it so necessary to let both sides have the last word." Gene Siskel of the Chicago Tribune gave the film two and a half out of four stars and wrote, "It's sweet, traditional, very safe, and riddled only with about 30 of Simon's punch-line jokes that may be OK on stage but are deadly mannered on film."

Janet Maslin of The New York Times described the love affair as "a whirlwind courtship with a gentle, lazy pace, which is one of many reasons why the film version feels self-contradictory, or at least incomplete. Fortunately, Miss Mason gives a vibrant, appealing performance that minimizes the movie's troubles and encourages the audience to sit back and enjoy the scenery." Variety stated: "'Chapter Two' represents Neil Simon at his big-screen best. Ray Stark's film version of Simon's successful and loosely autobiographical play is tender, compassionate and gently humorous all at once." Charles Champlin of the Los Angeles Times called it "Simon's most successful transference so far of play into film", with a performance by Mason that was "simply remarkable."

Stanley Kauffmann of The New Republic wrote, "Like the play, the film script is, first, slightly touching, then amusing, then bearing, then unbearable."

Writing in The New Yorker, Roger Angell observed that "James Caan, who is required to stare miserably out of a lot of different windows, seems ill at ease when delivering banter and/or moody musings. The only moments of real irony or interest are some tough, direct exchanges between Leo and Faye in the middle of their brief, miserable, inevitable affair."

==== In popular culture ====
A portion of the 1977 play and the 1979 film was featured in the plot of "The Letter", a Season 3 episode of the American sitcom Seinfeld. In the episode, Jerry's artistic ex-girlfriend sends him a thoughtful letter trying to get him back. Later seeing a broadcast of Chapter Two on TV, Jerry realizes she copied the letter from the film word-for-word. In a deleted scene included with the DVD release of the episode, Jerry retaliates by breaking up with her using dialogue copied word-for-word from Plaza Suite, another Neil Simon film.

==== Response from James Caan ====
James Caan later called the film a "nothing. Although I do like working with Marsha. I needed the work. I had been working on Hide in Plain Sight for two years. I didn't have any money."

=== Awards ===
Year	Award	Category	Recipient	Result
1980	Academy Awards	Best Actress in a Leading Role	Marsha Mason	Nominated
1980	Golden Globes	Best Motion Picture Actress – Musical/Comedy	Marsha Mason	Nominated
1980	Golden Globes	Best Supporting Actress	Valerie Harper	Nominated
