= Musante =

Musante is an Italian surname. Notable people with the surname include:

- Camila Musante (born 1990), Chilean politician
- Gerard Musante (born 1943), American psychologist
- Lorenzo Musante (c. 1730−1780), Italian pipe organ builder
- Tony Musante (1936−2013), American actor
