= Chapter Two (play) =

Play by Neil Simon

- Playbill cover
- Written by: Neil Simon
- Date premiered: October 7, 1977
- Place premiered: Ahmanson Theatre; Los Angeles
- Subject: A writer struggles to escape the memory of his recently deceased wife
- Genre: Comedy-drama

Chapter Two is a semi-autobiographical play by Neil Simon. The play premiered on Broadway in 1977, where it ran for 857 performances.

== History ==
According to Sheridan Morley, "This was in some ways the turning-point for Simon, the moment when he started to use his own life as something more than an excuse for a gag-fest. It was written as a tribute to Marsha Mason, his second wife, and her tolerance with his long-lasting grief over the death of his first wife...There is something very painful here, in among the gags, about a man trying to come to terms with death rather than a new life."

== Overview ==
The play focuses on a recently widowed writer, George Schneider, who is introduced by his press agent brother to soap opera actress Jennie Malone. Jennie's marriage to a football player has dissolved after six years. Both are uncertain of their readiness to start dating and developing a new romance when her breakup is so recent and he still has recurring memories of his deceased wife, Barbara.

Neil Simon's first wife, Joan Baim, died in 1973.

== Productions ==
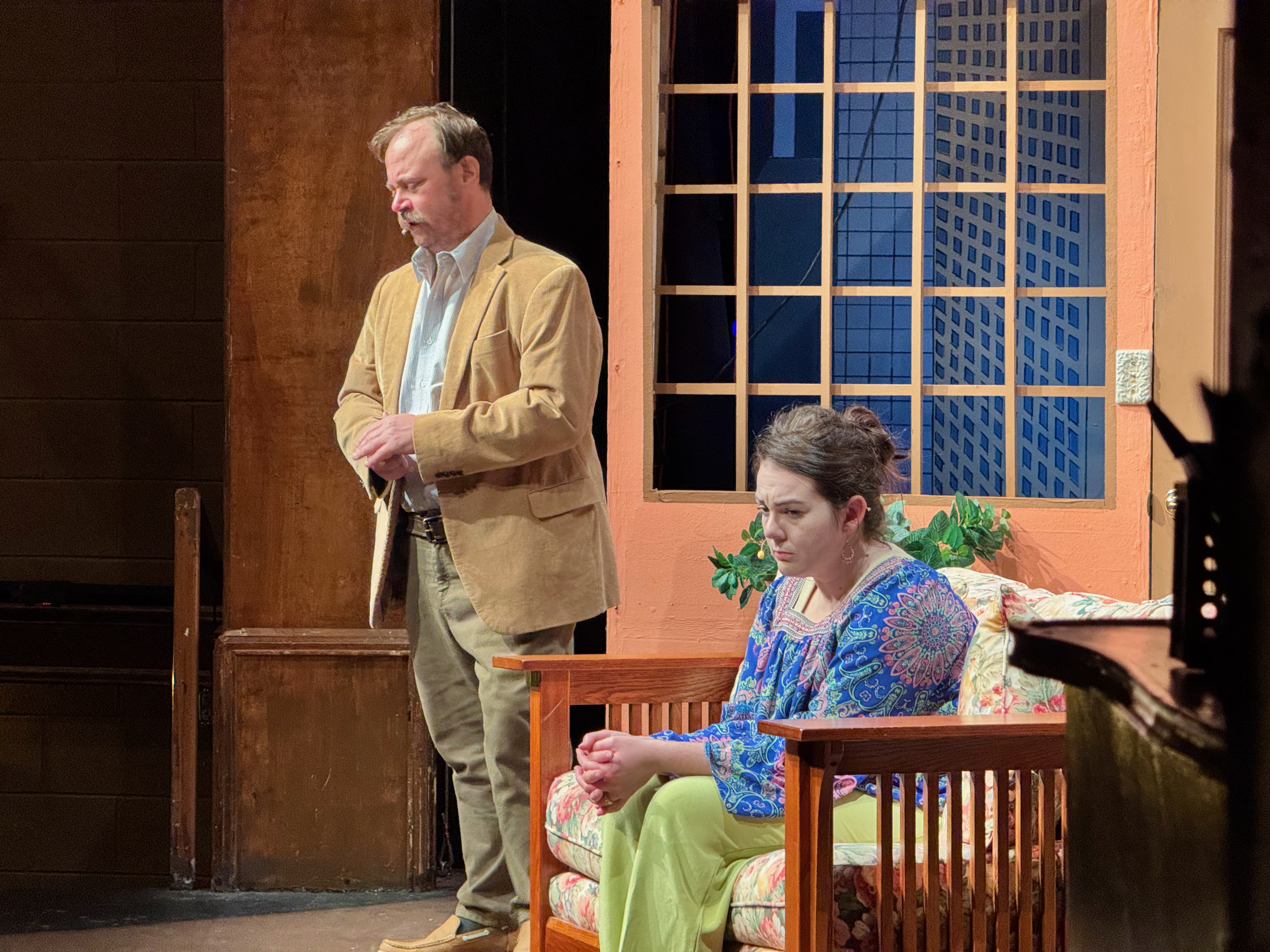
Actors perform Chapter Two at the Peacock Performing Arts Center

=== Stage ===
The play had its world premiere at the Los Angeles Ahmanson Theatre on October 7, 1977, closing November 26. Produced by Emanuel Azenberg and directed by Herbert Ross, the cast included: Judd Hirsch as George, Anita Gillette as Jennie, Cliff Gorman as Leo, and Ann Wedgeworth as Faye. The production won the Los Angeles Drama Critics Circle Awards (1977–78): Distinguished Production; and Neil Simon, Distinguished Playwriting. The play opened on Broadway at the Imperial Theatre on December 4, 1977, and transferred to the Eugene O'Neill Theatre in January 1979, where it closed on December 8, 1979 after 857 performances and seven previews. The Los Angeles cast reprised their roles on Broadway. Cast replacements included David Groh, Dick Latessa, Laurence Luckinbill, Robin Strasser, and Susan Browning.

The play received four 1978 Tony Award nominations: Tony Award for Best Play; Anita Gillette for Tony Award for Best Actress in a Play and Cliff Gorman for Tony Award for Best Featured Actor in a Play. Ann Wedgeworth won the 1978 Tony Award for Best Featured Actress in a Play.

The play premiered in the West End at the Gielgud Theatre in February 1996, with Tom Conti and Sharon Gless. Gless later recorded a two-disc audiobook of the play with David Dukes for LA TheatreWorks.

=== Television ===
A portion of the Chapter Two 1977 play and Chapter Two (1979 movie) were used in the plot of the sitcom Seinfeld's third season's episode: "The Letter".

=== Film ===
Simon adapted the play for the 1979 film version Chapter Two. It was directed by Robert Moore with James Caan and Simon's then-wife Marsha Mason, the inspiration for character Jennie. Caan said he made the film to earn some money while preparing for Hide in Plain Sight.
