= L.A. Theatre Works =

American nonprofit media arts organization

- Formation: 1984
- Type: Nonprofit, theatre
- Location: Los Angeles, California, United States
- Official language: English
- Website: www.latw.org

L.A. Theatre Works (LATW) is a not-for-profit American media arts organization based in Los Angeles, California. Founded in 1984 by Susan Albert Loewenberg, the organization produces, preserves, and distributes classic and contemporary plays of significance. Along with its "live-in-performance" series, some productions are taken on national and international tours. Recordings of productions are posted on its website and available via broadcast syndication as a weekly series on radio stations.

== History ==
The organization originally was known as Artists in Prison, and used theatre to facilitate creative expression by incarcerated men and women. In 1980, it changed its name to "L.A. Theatre Works," and then in 1985, began producing and recording radio dramas. The founding members included Edward Asner, Richard Dreyfuss, Héctor Elizondo, Harry Hamlin, Julie Harris, Amy Irving, Stacy Keach, John Lithgow, Marsha Mason, JoBeth Williams, Doris Baizley and current Producing Director Susan Loewenberg. They joined out of a desire to create a venue for stage acting in Los Angeles.

Between 1985 and 2012, L.A. Theatre Works has recorded over 400 plays. Titles include works by, among others:

- Jon Robin Baitz
- Rebecca Gilman
- Kenneth Lonergan
- David Mamet
- Arthur Miller
- Molière
- Lynn Nottage
- Yasmina Reza
- William Shakespeare
- Sophocles
- Tom Stoppard
- Oscar Wilde

In 1997, L.A. Theatre Works received an NEA Media Arts grant of $100,000 to support a campaign to increase the nationwide audience for its theatre library.

In 2005, it launched its National Touring program, taking "live-in-performance" radio dramas to venues across the country. As of 2012, L.A. Theatre Works has visited over 200 civic and performing arts centers and university venues with numerous productions. The organization's performances were at the Los Angeles Skirball Cultural Center, but in 2011, they began performing at the UCLA James Bridges Theatre. ALso in 2011, it began collaborating with Roundabout Theatre Company to broadcast productions from National Theatre Live in HD. These screenings are also held at the James Bridges Theatre. The first of these screenings was The Importance of Being Earnest produced by Roundabout Theatre Company, starring Brian Bedford. The same year, the organization completed its first International Tour of China with the play Top Secret: Battle for the Pentagon Papers.

In 2012, it began releasing e-books of its plays. These e-books allow a user to listen to a recorded play while reading along with the text. By May 2012, L.A. Theatre Works had a weekly public radio show in over 80 markets in the US, along with available online streaming at their website, which is hosted by Loewenberg and also contains bonus wrap-around content. The show is distributed by Public Radio Exchange (PRX). Recordings are available in over 9,000 libraries throughout the US and to the general public through the official website and from select retailers. L.A. Theatre Works' audio productions have received awards from the Corporation for Public Broadcasting, Writers Guild of America, Publishers Weekly, Library Journal, and Audio Publishers Association, among others.

Hollywood actors that have appeared in L.A. Theatre Works productions include, among many others:

- Ed Asner
- Annette Bening
- Héctor Elizondo
- Laurence Fishburne
- Paul Giamatti
- Neil Patrick Harris
- Julie Harris
- Glenne Headly
- Anne Heche
- John Lithgow
- Joe Mantegna
- Marsha Mason
- Alfred Molina
- Jason Ritter
- Jimmy Smits
- David Strathairn
- Hilary Swank
- JoBeth Williams

== Artist Advisory Council ==
The Artist Advisory Council currently includes Rosalind Ayres, Ed Begley Jr., Héctor Elizondo, Martin Jarvis, Stacy Keach, Marsha Mason, Richard Masur, Alfred Molina, David Selby, Eric Stoltz, JoBeth Williams, and Charlayne Woodard.
