= When the Circus Came to Town =

1981 television film directed by Boris Sagal

- Genre: Drama
- Screenplay by: Larry Grusin
- Story by: Larry Grusin
- Directed by: Boris Sagal
- Starring: Elizabeth Montgomery; Christopher Plummer; Eileen Brennan
- Theme music composer: Charles Gross
- Country of origin: United States
- Original language: English

Production
- Executive producer: Barry Krost
- Producer: Robert Halmi Sr.
- Production location: Savannah, Georgia
- Cinematography: Michel Hugo
- Editor: Murray Solomon
- Running time: 120 min.
- Production companies: Entheos Unlimited Productions; Meteor Films

Original release
- Network: CBS
- Release: January 20, 1981

When the Circus Came to Town is a 1981 American made-for-television drama film directed by Boris Sagal and starring Elizabeth Montgomery, Christopher Plummer, and Eileen Brennan. It originally aired on CBS as a "Movie of the Week" on January 20, 1981.

== Story ==
When the Circus Came to Town chronicles the life of Mary Flynn (Montgomery), a woman nearing middle age living in a small town. When the circus comes through town, she realizes nothing will ever change unless she does something different, so she leaves her boring sheltered life to run away and join the circus. While adapting to her new life, she finds herself challenged, and in the end, happy with her new life.

== Cast ==
- Elizabeth Montgomery . . . Mary Flynn
- Christopher Plummer . . . Duke Royal
- Eileen Brennan . . . Jessy
- Gretchen Wyler . . . Olivia Probaska
- Anne Shropshire . . . Aunt Helen
- Tommy Madden . . . Louie
- Timothy Hill . . . Schuller
- Russell Saunders . . . Ivan Probashka
- Mark Yerkes . . . Sergei Probashka
- Bob Yerkes . . . Georgi Probashka
- J. Don Ferguson . . . Andre Probashka
- Anne Haney . . . Blossom
- George Ellis . . . Rodriguez
- Don Devendorf . . . Motel Clerk
- Charles Lawlor . . . Redneck
- Nicholas Warf . . . Juggler

== Production notes ==
=== Crew ===
- Directed by: Boris Sagal
- Second Assistant Director: Stephen A. Glanzrock
- Written by: Larry Grusin
- Executive Producer: Barry Krost
- Producer: Robert Halmi, Sr.
- Associate Producer: Robert Halmi, Jr.
- Original Music: Charles Gross
- Orchestrator: Gary Anderson
- Cinematography: Michel Hugo
- Film Editor: Murray Solomon
- Production Design: Robert Gundlach
- Choreographer: Marge Champion Sagal
- Dialogue Coach: Marge Champion Sagal
