= The Cheap Detective =

1978 film by Robert Moore

- Theatrical poster
- Directed by: Robert Moore
- Written by: Neil Simon
- Produced by: Ray Stark; Margaret Booth (associate producer)
- Starring: Peter Falk; Madeline Kahn; Dom DeLuise; Louise Fletcher; Ann-Margret; Eileen Brennan; Vic Tayback; Stockard Channing; Scatman Crothers; Marsha Mason; Sid Caesar; Abe Vigoda
- Cinematography: John A. Alonzo
- Edited by: Sidney Levin; Michael A. Stevenson
- Music by: Patrick Williams
- Production companies: Columbia Pictures; EMI Films; Rastar
- Distributed by: Columbia Pictures
- Release date: June 23, 1978
- Running time: 92 minutes
- Country: United States
- Languages: English; German
- Budget: $5-6 million
- Box office: $28,221,552

The Cheap Detective is a 1978 American neo-noir private eye mystery comedy film written by Neil Simon and directed by Robert Moore.

It stars Peter Falk as Lou Peckinpaugh, a parody of Humphrey Bogart. The film is a parody of Bogart films such as Casablanca and The Maltese Falcon.

The ensemble cast includes Madeline Kahn, Louise Fletcher, Ann-Margret, Eileen Brennan, Stockard Channing, Marsha Mason, Sid Caesar, John Houseman, Dom DeLuise, Abe Vigoda, James Coco, Phil Silvers, Fernando Lamas, Nicol Williamson, Scatman Crothers, Vic Tayback and Paul Williams.

== Plot ==
Lou Peckinpaugh (Peter Falk), a bumbling San Francisco private detective, tries to prove himself innocent of his partner's murder while helping a bizarre array of characters recover a lost treasure. A large number of people are murdered in crazy death poses before he finds out from Pepe Damascus that they were all after twelve large egg-shaped diamonds. Vladimir Tserijemiwtz, who had the diamonds, is shot by his partner Marcel, who had been bleeding for 10 years. Peckinpaugh confronts those searching for the diamonds in his home, finding that the eggs concealed real baby chicks. A final confrontation between the protagonists and Col. Schlissel ensues at the waterfront.

== Cast ==
- Peter Falk as Lou Peckinpaugh (Humphrey Bogart)
- Ann-Margret as Jezebel Dezire
- Eileen Brennan as Betty DeBoop (Lauren Bacall)
- Sid Caesar as Ezra Dezire/Vladimir Tserijemiwtz
- Stockard Channing as Bess (Lee Patrick)
- James Coco as Marcel
- Dom DeLuise as Pepe Damascus (Peter Lorre)
- Louise Fletcher as Marlene DuChard (Ingrid Bergman)
- John Houseman as Jasper Blubber (Sydney Greenstreet)
- Madeline Kahn as Mrs. Montenegro (Mary Astor)
- Fernando Lamas as Paul DuChard (Paul Henreid)
- Marsha Mason as Georgia Merkle (Gladys George)
- Phil Silvers as Hoppy
- Abe Vigoda as Sgt. Rizzuto
- Paul Williams as Boy (Elisha Cook Jr.)
- Nicol Williamson as Col. Schlissel (Conrad Veidt)
- Carmine Caridi as Sgt. Crosetti
- James Cromwell as Schnell
- Scatman Crothers as Tinker (Dooley Wilson)
- David Ogden Stiers as Captain
- Vic Tayback as Lieutenant DiMaggio
- John Calvin as Qvicker
- Jonathan Banks as Cabbie

== Reception ==
The film grossed $5,113,743 in its opening weekend from 648 theaters, finishing third for the weekend behind Grease and Jaws 2 in their second weekends. Film critic Roger Ebert stated that "If you loved The Maltese Falcon and can recite all the best lines from Casablanca by heart, you'll hate The Cheap Detective, which is basically just the year's classiest and most expensive rip-off."

Margaret Booth, who worked for Ray Stark, said the film "wasn't funny."

A number of critics gave the film very positive reviews: The Fresno Bee noted that "Neil Simon has done it again. Written a film that is funny, entertaining, and a treat for old movie buffs."

Ed Mintz founded CinemaScore in 1979 after disliking The Cheap Detective despite being a fan of Neil Simon and hearing another disappointed attendee wanting to hear the opinions of ordinary people instead of critics.

== See also ==
- Murder by Death – a 1976 film featuring Falk as a similar character (another Sam Spade parody) that was written by Simon and directed by Moore.
