= Marsha Mason =

American actress

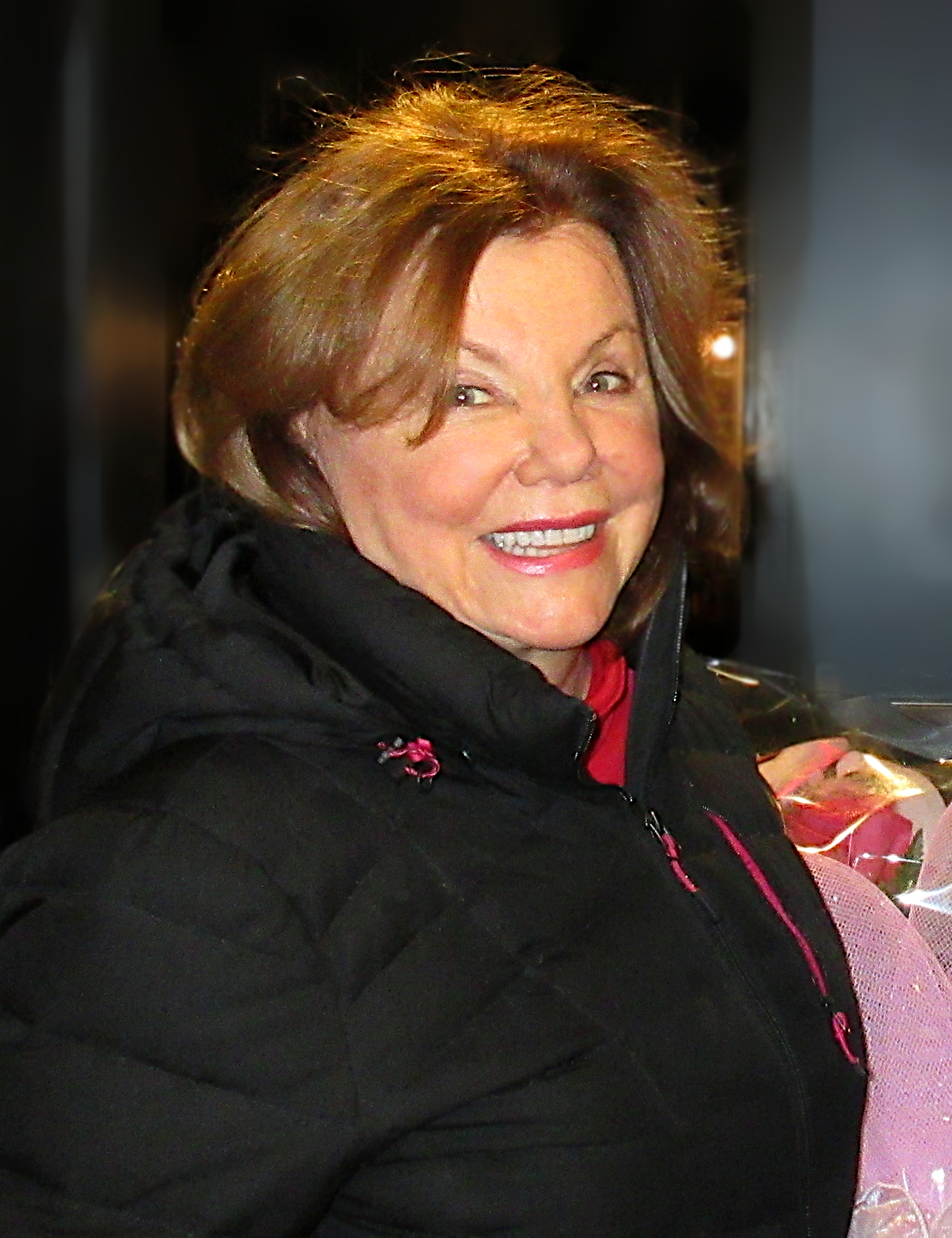
- Mason in 2018
- Born: April 3, 1942 (age 84); St. Louis, Missouri, U.S.
- Occupations: Actress, director
- Years active: 1966–present
- Spouses: Gary Campbell (m. 1965; div. 1970) Neil Simon (m. 1973; div. 1983)

Marsha Mason (born April 3, 1942) is an American actress and theatre director. She has been nominated four times for the Academy Award for Best Actress for her performances in Cinderella Liberty (1973), The Goodbye Girl (1977), Chapter Two (1979), and Only When I Laugh (1981). The first two also won her Golden Globe Awards. She was married for 10 years (1973–1983) to the playwright and screenwriter Neil Simon, who wrote all but the first film cited above, in addition to several others in which she starred.

Mason's film debut was in the 1966 film Hot Rod Hullabaloo. Her other films include Blume in Love (1973), The Cheap Detective (1978), Max Dugan Returns (1983), Heartbreak Ridge (1986), Stella (1990) and Drop Dead Fred (1991). On television, she appeared in the soap opera Love of Life (1971–72) and received a Primetime Emmy Award nomination for her recurring role on the sitcom Frasier (1997–98).

She has also had an extensive career on stage, making her Broadway debut as a replacement in the comedy Cactus Flower in 1968. She starred in a 1999 revival of The Prisoner of Second Avenue in London, and received a Grammy nomination for Best Comedy Album for the 2000 recording. In 2006, she starred in the American premiere production of Hecuba at the Chicago Shakespeare Theater. Her other Broadway credits include The Night of the Iguana (1996), Steel Magnolias (2005), and Impressionism (2009).

Mason guest starred in Madam Secretary (2015–16) and The Good Wife (2016), and had recurring roles on the ABC sitcom The Middle from 2010 to 2017 and the Netflix series Grace and Frankie from 2016 until its conclusion in 2022.

== Career ==
After seeing her 1973 film debut in Blume in Love, Neil Simon cast Mason in his Broadway play The Good Doctor. Shortly afterwards, Mason and Simon, a widower, fell in love and got married. That same year, Mason played pool-hustling hooker Maggie Paul alongside James Caan in the 20th Century Fox film Cinderella Liberty, for which she received her first Academy Award nomination. In 1977, Mason's performance as former Broadway dancer Paula McFadden in Simon's smash hit film, The Goodbye Girl, netted her a second Academy Award nomination. In 1979, Simon successfully cast Mason as the vivacious, recent-divorced actress Jennie MacLaine in the screen adaptation of his hit play Chapter Two, which was based on Mason's relationship with Simon up to their marriage. The film proved to be another big hit, garnering her a third Academy Award nomination.

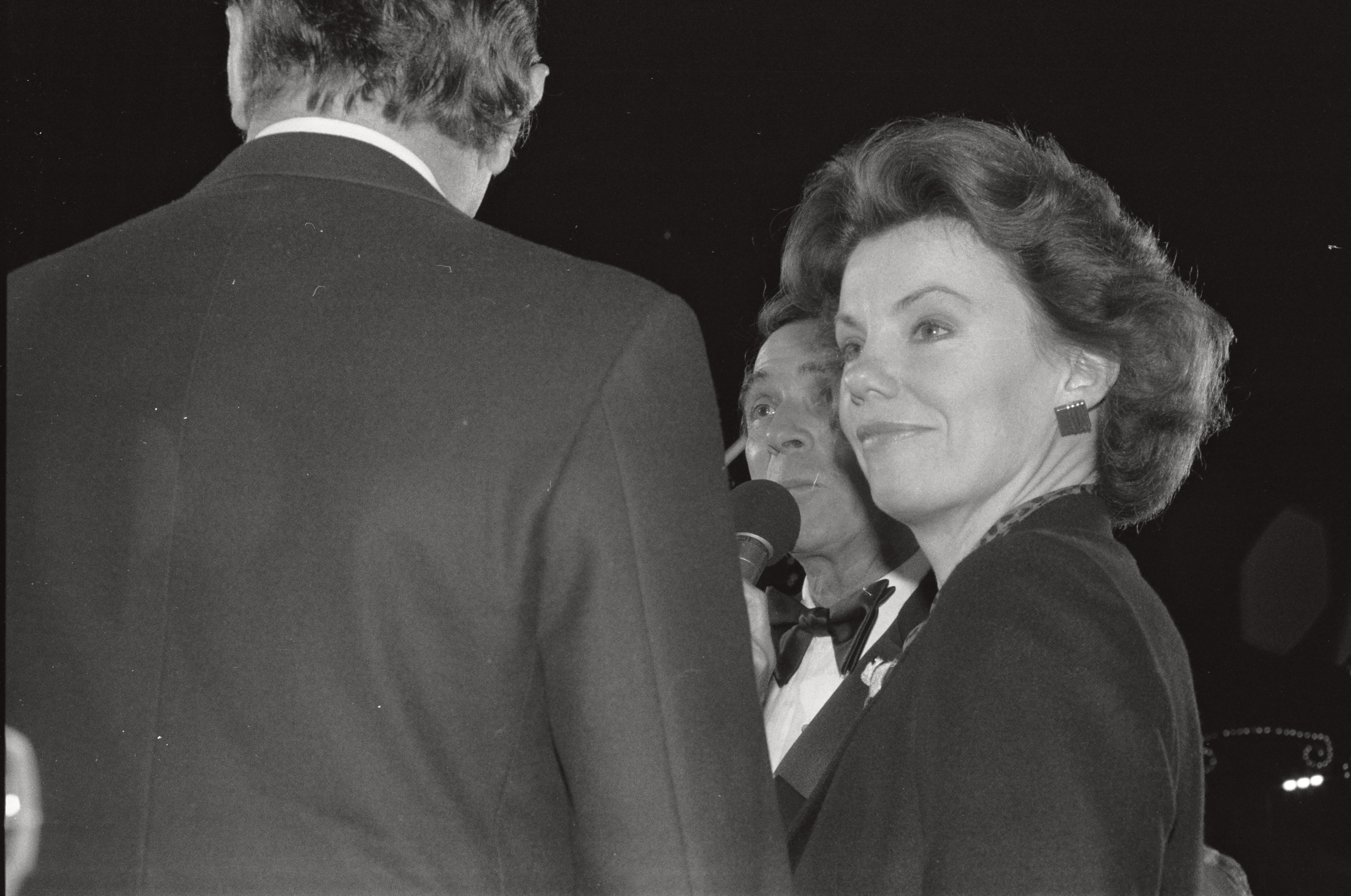
Mason at the premiere of Seems Like Old Times (1980)

In 1981, Mason starred along with Kristy McNichol, James Coco, and Joan Hackett in Only When I Laugh, Simon's film adaptation of his Broadway dramedy The Gingerbread Lady; it was another box-office success. For her performance as struggling alcoholic actress Georgia Hines, Mason was highly praised and earned a fourth Academy Award nomination.

Mason's Max Dugan Returns (1983), also written by Simon, grossed a modest $17.6 million at the box office. Despite a stellar cast led by Mason, Donald Sutherland, Jason Robards and Matthew Broderick, the film was a slow starter, becoming more popular after premiering on cable TV and VHS. By this time, Mason and Simon had divorced, and her film career lost momentum. She co-starred with Clint Eastwood in the 1986 film Heartbreak Ridge, which was fairly well received and a commercial success. Mason also played a supporting role in the 1990 motion picture Stella starring Bette Midler, a remake of the 1937 film Stella Dallas.

Mason played in a New York production of Harold Pinter's Old Times. She next directed the play Juno's Swans (1986), by E. Katherine Kerr, at the Second Stage Theatre in Los Angeles.

Her stage credits include Norman Mailer's The Deer Park, Israel Horovitz's The Indian Wants the Bronx, Neil Simon's The Good Doctor and Joseph Papp's 1974 Richard III at the Lincoln Center. Mason starred on Broadway in a revival of Night of the Iguana in 1996, and the following year in Michael Cristofer's Amazing Grace. Mason reunited with Goodbye Girl co-star Richard Dreyfuss and writer Neil Simon in Duncan Weldon and Emanuel Azenberg's production of The Prisoner of Second Avenue in 1999, which was performed at the L.A. Theatre Works shortly after a revival in London's West End. She earned a Grammy nomination in comedy.

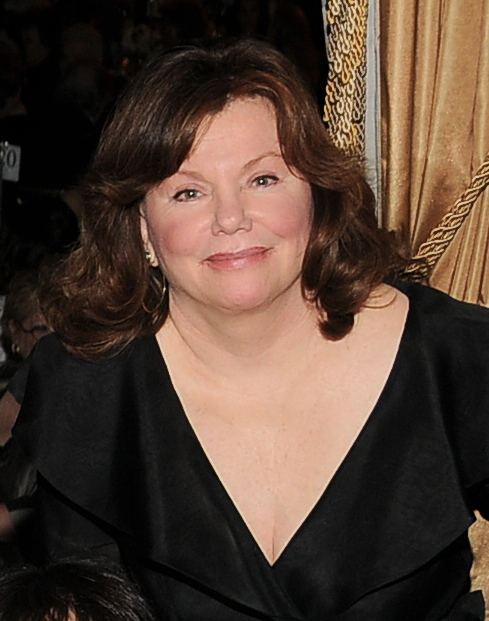
Mason in 2010

She appeared in Charles L. Mee's Wintertime at the Second Stage Theatre in New York City. In August 2005, Mason starred as Hecuba at the Chicago Shakespeare Theater and on Broadway in Steel Magnolias, with Delta Burke, Frances Sternhagen, Rebecca Gayheart, Lily Rabe and Christine Ebersole. She appeared in A Feminine Ending at Playwrights Horizons, and in the Shakespeare Theater Company's performance of All's Well That Ends Well in Washington, D.C. Recently, she starred in Lillian Hellman's Watch on the Rhine at Arena Stage in Washington, D.C. and off-Broadway in the Irish Repertory Theatre's production of "Little Gem" which earned her an Outer Critics Circle Award for Outstanding Performance by an Actress in a Play.

Mason's television work includes guest roles on Seinfeld, Lipstick Jungle, and Army Wives. Mason starred in her own series, Sibs, which ran from 1991 to 1992. In 1997 and 1998, she had a recurring role on the TV show Frasier as Sherry Dempsey, Martin Crane's flamboyant girlfriend. She received a nomination for the Primetime Emmy Award for Outstanding Guest Actress in a Comedy Series. In February 2010, she co-starred in California Suite at the Skirball Cultural Center in Los Angeles.

Mason played Patricia Heaton's mother in the ABC comedy series The Middle from 2010 to its conclusion in 2018. Other recent TV roles have included Grace & Frankie, Madam Secretary, and The Good Wife.

In April 2010, Mason co-starred with Keir Dullea and Matt Servitto in an Off-Broadway production of I Never Sang for My Father. For her performance as Margaret Garrison, Mason received good reviews.

During the pandemic, she appeared in Zoom productions of Dear Liar with Brian Cox for Bucks County Playhouse and opposite Richard Dreyfuss in "The Letters of Noel Coward" for Bay Street Playhouse in Sag Harbor, New York.

As a director, Mason has helmed productions of Neil Simon's Chapter Two and Robert Harling's Steel Magnolias at the Bucks County Playhouse; the first female version of An Act of God with Paige Davis at Arizona Theatre Company; Juno Stories for Second Stage in New York City; the world premiere of Tennessee Williams' Talisman Roses with Amanda Plummer for the Tennessee Williams Festival in Provincetown, Massachusetts; and a benefit production of The Man Who Came To Dinner starring Walter Bobbie and Brooke Shields for Bucks County Playhouse. Marsha was Associate Director with Jack O'Brien for the Roundabout Theatre Company's production of All My Sons on Broadway. In 2022, she starred in and co-directed Neil Simon's Lost in Yonkers at Hartford Stage.

Mason has a star on the St. Louis Walk of Fame.

She has taught at HB Studio (Herbert Berghof Studio) in New York City.

== Personal life ==
Mason was born in St. Louis, Missouri, on April 3, 1942, to Jacqueline Helena (Rakowski) and James Joseph Mason, a printer. She and her younger sister, Mary Melinda (1943 - 2022), were raised Roman Catholic and grew up in Crestwood. Mason is a graduate of Nerinx Hall High School and Webster University, both in Webster Groves. While at Webster, she performed in a variety of theatrical productions. She raced a Mazda RX-3 in SCCA events.

Mason was married to actor Gary Campbell from 1965 until they divorced in 1970. Her second marriage, to playwright Neil Simon, lasted from 1973 until their 1983 divorce.

A former long-time resident of New Mexico, Mason had a farm in Abiquiu that grew certified organic herbs. In the late 1990s, Mason sold herbs wholesale to companies both locally and regionally before starting a line of wellness and bath and body products called "Resting in the River". Now based in New York City, in 2018 she completed building a home on a hayfield in Litchfield County, Connecticut, where she currently resides. Mason has frequently visited Eastern countries like India for many decades and has been a practitioner of Transcendental Meditation since 1970.

== Filmography ==
=== Film ===
Year	Title	Role	Notes
1966	Hot Rod Hullabaloo		
1968	Beyond the Law	Marcia Stillwell	
1973	Blume in Love	Arlene	
1973	Cinderella Liberty	Maggie Paul	
1974	Cyrano de Bergerac	Roxane	
1977	Audrey Rose	Janice Templeton	
1977	The Goodbye Girl	Paula McFadden	
1978	The Cheap Detective	Georgia Merkle	
1979	Promises in the Dark	Dr. Alexandra Kendall	
1979	Chapter Two	Jennie MacLaine	
1981	Only When I Laugh	Georgia Hines	
1983	Max Dugan Returns	Nora McPhee	
1986	Heartbreak Ridge	Aggie	
1990	Stella	Janice Morrison	
1991	Drop Dead Fred	Polly Cronin	
1994	I Love Trouble	Sen. Gayle Robbins	
1995	Nick of Time	Gov. Eleanor Grant	
1996	2 Days in the Valley	Audrey Hopper	
2004	Bride and Prejudice	Catherine Darcy	
2004	Bereft	Helen	
2013	Across Grace Alley	Grandmother	Short

=== Television ===
Year	Title	Role	Notes
1969	Dark Shadows	Audrey / Vampire Girl	"1.915"
1971	Where the Heart Is	Laura Blackburn	TV series
1971–1972	Love of Life	Judith Cole	TV series
1972	Young Dr. Kildare	Nurse Lord	"I'm Handling It", "The Stranger"
1974	Great Performances	Roxane	"Cyrano de Bergerac"
1982	Lois Gibbs and the Love Canal	Lois Gibbs	TV film
1985	Surviving	Lois	TV film
1986	Trapped in Silence	Jennifer Hubbell	TV film
1988	Hothouse	Courtney Woods	"The Actress"
1989	Dinner at Eight	Millicent Jordan	TV film
1990	The Image	Jean Cromwell	TV film
1991–1992	Sibs	Nora Ruscio	Main role
1992	Seinfeld	Jennie MacLaine (voice)	"The Letter"
1993	One Life to Live	Sabrina	1 episode
1995	Broken Trust	Ruth	TV film
1997–1998	Frasier	Sherry Dempsey	Recurring role (6 episodes)
1999	Restless Spirits	Lydia	TV film
2001	Life with Judy Garland: Me and My Shadows	Ethel Gumm	TV miniseries
2002	The Education of Max Bickford	Lilith Bigelow	"The Egg and I"
2004	The Long Shot	Mary Lou O'Brian	TV film
2006	Nightmares & Dreamscapes: From the Stories of Stephen King	Aunt Trudy	"The Road Virus Heads North"
2008	Lipstick Jungle	Lorraine Lipman	"Carpe Threesome"
2008	Army Wives	Charlotte Meade	"Mothers & Wives", "Great Expectations"
2010–2017	The Middle	Pat Spence	Recurring guest (11 episodes)
2013	Untitled Bounty Hunter Project	Lucille Ryan	TV film
2015–2016	Madam Secretary	Dr. Kinsey Sherman	"The Kill List", "Connection Lost"
2016	The Good Wife	Judge Louisa Page	"Tracks"
2021–2022	Around the Sun (audio drama)	Marge	Voice; 3 episodes
2016–2022	Grace and Frankie	Arlene	Recurring guest (8 episodes)
2026	Holiday Touchdown: A Bears Love Story	Darlene	TV film (The Hallmark Channel)

=== Stage ===
Year	Title	Role	Notes
1967	The Deer Park	Bobby	Theatre de Lys, Off-Broadway
1970	Happy Birthday, Wanda June	Penelope Ryan	Edison Theatre, Broadway
1973	The Good Doctor	Performer	Eugene O'Neill Theatre, Broadway
1974	Richard III	Lady Anne	New York Shakespeare Festival, Off-Broadway
1983	Old Times	Kate	Roundabout Theatre Company, Off-Broadway
1995	Amazing Grace	Selena Goodall	Pittsburgh Public Theater
1996	The Night of the Iguana	Maxine Faulk	Olympia Theatre, Broadway
2000	The Prisoner of Second Avenue	Edna Edison	L.A. Theatre Works, Los Angeles
2003	Wintertime	Maria	Second Stage Theater, Off-Broadway
2005	Steel Magnolias	Ouiser	Lyceum Theatre, Broadway
2006	Hecuba	Hecuba	Chicago Shakespeare Theatre
2007	A Feminine Ending	Kim	Playwrights Horizons, Off-Broadway
2009	Impressionism	Julia Davidson	Gerald Schoenfeld Theatre, Broadway
2010	California Suite	Hannah Warren/Sidney Nichols/Gert Franklyn	L.A. Theatre Works, Los Angeles
2010	I Never Sang For My Father	Margaret	Clurman Theatre, Off-Broadway
2010	All's Well That Ends Well	Countess of Rossillion	Shakespeare Theatre Company, Washington D.C.
2011	The Circle	Lady Catherine Champion-Cheney	Westport Country Playhouse
2015	Arms and the Man	Catherine Petkoff	The Old Globe
2017	Watch on the Rhine	Fanny Farrelly	Arena Stage, Washington D.C.
2018	Fire and Air	The Nurse	Classic Stage Company, Off-Broadway
2019	Little Gem	Kay	Irish Repertory Theatre, Off-Broadway
2022	Lost in Yonkers	Grandmother Kurnitz	Hartford Stage
2024	All My Sons	Kate Keller	Hartford Stage

== Awards and nominations ==
Year	Association	Category	Nominated work	Result
1974	Academy Awards	Best Actress	Cinderella Liberty	Nominated
1974	Golden Globe Award	Best Actress in a Motion Picture - Drama	Cinderella Liberty	Won
1974	National Society of Film Critics	Best Actress	Cinderella Liberty	Nominated
1978	Academy Awards	Best Actress	The Goodbye Girl	Nominated
1978	Golden Globe Award	Best Actress in a Motion Picture - Comedy or Musical	The Goodbye Girl	Won
1979	British Academy Film Awards	Best Actress	The Goodbye Girl	Nominated
1980	Academy Awards	Best Actress	Chapter Two	Nominated
1980	Golden Globe Award	Best Actress in a Motion Picture - Comedy or Musical	Chapter Two	Nominated
1980	Golden Globe Award	Best Actress in a Motion Picture - Drama	Promises in the Dark	Nominated
1982	Academy Awards	Best Actress	Only When I Laugh	Nominated
1991	CableACE Award	Supporting Actress in a Movie or Miniseries	The Image	Nominated
1997	Primetime Emmy Award	Outstanding Guest Actress in a Comedy Series	Frasier	Nominated
1997	Viewers for Quality Television Q Awards	Best Recurring Player	Frasier	Nominated
2001	Temecula Valley International Film Festival	Lifetime Achievement Award		Won
2002	St. Louis International Film Festival	Lifetime Achievement Award		Won
