= Gerard Musante =

American psychologist (born 1943)

Gerard John Musante
- Born: 1943 (age 82–83); New York City, USA

Gerard John Musante (born 1943) is an American psychologist born in New York City. He is the author of the book The Structure House Weight Loss Plan: Achieve Your Ideal Weight Through a New Relationship with Food.

== Career ==
Musante has contributed to over 30 papers. In 2004 and 2006, he appeared as an expert in front of a 2006 congressional panel holding hearings on a bill designed to combat obesity in America.

Musante is a Consulting Professor on the Department of Psychiatry and Behavioral Sciences Duke University Medical Center Durham, North Carolina as well as a Diplomate, American Board of Professional Psychology in Clinical Psychology.

== Structure House ==
In 1977, Musante founded the weight loss institute Structure House Inc. In 2007, Structure House was purchased by the CRC Health Group. Musante remains the director of the program.

== See also ==
- James Coco
