= Murder by Death =

1976 film by Robert Moore

- Theatrical release poster
- Directed by: Robert Moore
- Written by: Neil Simon
- Produced by: Ray Stark
- Starring: Eileen Brennan; Truman Capote; James Coco; Peter Falk; Alec Guinness; Elsa Lanchester; David Niven; Peter Sellers; Maggie Smith; Nancy Walker; Estelle Winwood
- Cinematography: David M. Walsh
- Edited by: John F. Burnett
- Music by: Dave Grusin
- Production company: Rastar
- Distributed by: Columbia Pictures
- Release date: June 23, 1976
- Running time: 94 minutes
- Country: United States
- Language: English
- Box office: $32.5 million

Murder by Death is a 1976 American comedy mystery film directed by Robert Moore and written by Neil Simon. The film stars Eileen Brennan, Truman Capote, James Coco, Peter Falk, Alec Guinness, Elsa Lanchester, David Niven, Peter Sellers, Maggie Smith, Nancy Walker, and Estelle Winwood.

The plot is a broad parody or spoof of the traditional country-house whodunit, familiar to mystery fiction fans of classics such as Agatha Christie's And Then There Were None. The cast is an ensemble of British and American actors playing send-ups of well-known fictional sleuths, including Hercule Poirot, Miss Marple, Charlie Chan, Nick and Nora Charles, and Sam Spade. It also features a rare acting performance by author Truman Capote.

The film was presented at the 35th Venice International Film Festival on September 5, 1976.

== Plot ==
A group of five renowned detectives, each accompanied by a relative or associate, is invited to "dinner and a murder" by the mysterious Lionel Twain. Having lured his guests to his mansion managed by a blind butler named Jamessir Bensonmum, who is later joined by a deaf-mute and illiterate cook named Yetta, Twain joins his guests at dinner. He presses a button which seals off the house. Twain announces that he is the greatest criminologist in the world. To prove his claim, he challenges the guests to solve a murder that will occur at midnight; a reward of $1 million will be presented to the winner.

Before midnight, the butler is found dead. Twain disappears, only to reappear immediately after midnight, stabbed twelve times in the back with a butcher knife. The cook is also discovered to have been an animated mannequin, now packed in a storage crate. The guests spend the rest of the night investigating and bickering. They are manipulated by a mysterious behind-the-scenes force, confused by red herrings, and baffled by the "electronic marvels" of Twain's house. They ultimately find their own lives threatened. Each sleuth presents his or her theory on the case, pointing out the others' past connections to Twain and their possible motives for murdering him.

When they retire to their guest rooms for the night, the guests are each confronted by things that threaten to kill them—a deadly snake, a venomous scorpion, a descending ceiling, poison gas, and a time bomb. They all survive, and in the morning, they gather in the office, where they find the butler waiting, very much alive and not blind. Each detective presents a different piece of evidence with which they each independently solved the mystery, and in each case, they accuse the butler of being one of Twain's former associates.

At first, the butler plays the part of each person with whom he is identified, but then he pulls off a mask to reveal himself as Lionel Twain, alive. Twain disparages the detectives—and metafictionally, the authors who created them—for the way their adventures have been handled. He points out such authorial misdeeds as introducing crucial characters at the last minute for the traditional "twist in the tale", as the assembled detectives had been doing a few minutes earlier, and withholding clues and information to make it impossible for the reader to solve the mystery. Each of the detectives departs the house empty-handed, none of them having won the $1 million. When asked whether there had been a murder, Wang replies, "Yes. Killed good weekend."

Alone, Twain pulls off yet another mask to reveal Yetta, who lights a cigarette and laughs maniacally while rings of tobacco smoke fill the screen.

== Cast and characters ==
The story takes place in and around the isolated country home inhabited by eccentric multi-millionaire Lionel Twain (Truman Capote), his blind butler Jamessir Bensonmum (Alec Guinness), and a deaf-mute cook named Yetta (Nancy Walker). "Lionel Twain" is a pun on "Lionel Train" and the sign for Twain's house reads "22 Twain" ("choo-choo train"). The participants are all pastiches of famous fictional detectives:

- Inspector Sidney Wang (portrayed by Peter Sellers in yellowface) is based on Earl Derr Biggers' Chinese/Hawaiian police detective Charlie Chan. The detective is accompanied by his adopted Japanese son Willie (Richard Narita). Wang wears elaborate Chinese inspired costumes and speaks in broken English, which is criticized by Twain and others.
- Dick and Dora Charleston (David Niven and Maggie Smith) are modeled after Dashiell Hammett's characters Nick and Nora Charles from the Thin Man film series, appearing as a genteel, wealthy couple. The Charles' Wire Fox Terrier "Asta" is also lampooned, appearing here named "Myron".
- Milo Perrier (James Coco) is based on Agatha Christie's Hercule Poirot and arrives at the house with his heavily French-accented chauffeur Marcel Cassette (James Cromwell). Perrier is portrayed as singularly interested in food, particularly sweets, and constantly squabbling with and being cared for by Marcel.
- Sam Diamond (Peter Falk) is an amalgamation of two Humphrey Bogart detective characters; Sam Spade from The Maltese Falcon (1941 film) and Rick Blaine from Casablanca (film). He is accompanied by his secretary, Tess Skeffington (Eileen Brennan), whom he consistently patronizes and denigrates, while relying on her to conduct his investigations.
- Jessica Marbles (Elsa Lanchester) parodies Agatha Christie's Miss Marple character. Her portrayal resembles Margaret Rutherford's interpretation of the detective, being lighthearted and generally dressed in tweeds. She is accompanied by her wheelchair bound and much older nurse, Miss Withers (Estelle Winwood), whose appearance is closer to Christie's conception.

== Production ==
Charles Addams, creator of The Addams Family, drew the art and caricatures displayed at the beginning, during the end credits, and on the poster.

=== Deleted scenes ===
An additional scene, not in the theatrical version but shown in some television versions, shows Sherlock Holmes (Keith McConnell) and Dr. Watson (Richard Peel) arriving as the other guests are leaving; they ask directions from Sidney Wang, who chooses not to warn them and tells Willie, "Let idiots find out for themselves." Author Ron Haydock states that an early draft of Neil Simon's script featured Holmes and Watson actually solving the mystery, but their roles were reduced to a cameo appearance and finally deleted, as the lead actors felt they were being "upstaged".

There were three other scenes deleted from the film:

- En route to the Twain mansion, the Charlestons nearly run down Tess Skeffington, who is returning to Sam Diamond's car with gasoline; instead of giving her a lift, they apologize and drive on.
- Upon arriving at the Twain mansion, Jessica Marbles' London cabbie lets her know the fare.
- After Twain's murder, Willie Wang claims to have found a clue in the dead man's hand that was overlooked by the great detectives; the clue, a note from "Lionel Twain, deceased", turns out to only be a reminder to the milkman to stop delivery.

== Novelization ==
A novelization based on Neil Simon's script was written by H. R. F. Keating and published in the United States by Warner Books (ISBN 978-0446881616) and by Star Books in the United Kingdom. The novelization contains the deleted Tess Skeffington and Willie Wang scenes, as well as a totally different ending in which Bensonmum is revealed to be still alive and Twain admits that although the detectives failed, they failed brilliantly and have made him love them all again.

== Reception ==
Murder by Death received generally positive reviews from critics. On Rotten Tomatoes, the film holds an approval rating of 63% based on 24 reviews, with an average rating of 5.9/10.

=== Domestic reviews ===
Vincent Canby of The New York Times wrote that the film had one of Simon's "nicest, breeziest screenplays," with James Coco "very, very funny as the somewhat prissy take-off on Hercule Poirot" and David Niven and Maggie Smith "marvelous as Dick and Dora Charleston, though they haven't enough to do." Arthur D. Murphy of Variety called it "a very good silly-funny Neil Simon satirical comedy, with a super all-star cast," adding, "It's the sort of film one could see more than once and pick up on comedy bits unnoticed at first. Dave Grusin's music is another highlight." Charles Champlin of the Los Angeles Times found the film "amusing" but added, "Why it is only amusing, and not hilarious, madcap, riotous, rip-roaring, or richly romping, I don't entirely know. It's a short movie (94 minutes) but a slow one, surprisingly so when you'd have said knockabout speed was called for."

Gene Siskel of the Chicago Tribune gave the film three stars out of four and wrote that "after getting off to a shaky start, the picture quickly hits a speedball comedy pace it doesn't lose until the unsatisfactory unravelling of the mystery." Gary Arnold of The Washington Post stated that "this burlesque whodunit is probably too static and thinly contrived to generate a lasting sense of pleasure, but it's the kind of skillfully obvious, mock-innocent spoof that seems good fun while it lasts, and the fun is enhanced by the most adept and attractive comedy cast in recent memory." John Simon wrote, "Murder by Death is not a movie to write or read about, but to be seen and modestly enjoyed". Kathleen Carroll of the New York Daily News wrote that the characters are "the impish inventions of writer Neil Simon, who, in caricaturing this Round Table meeting of the world's greatest fictional detectives, displays his usual killer's instinct for sharp, savvy comedy. His 'Murder by Death' is not without flaws, however: there are lapses in taste, and some of his gags are just awful; the production has a routine Movie-of-the-Week look to it; and poor Truman Capote is an unfortunate choice for Twain, looking more pained than menacing—as if the whole experience had been about as pleasurable as sitting in a dentist's chair. But then what amateur actor wouldn't panic in the presence of this wonderful cast? The special joy of "Murder by Death" lies in savoring the individual performances, so rare is it to see truly stylish acting on the screen these days." Dale Stevens of The Cincinnati Post said that "there is a deliciously old-fashioned feeling about the movie 'Murder By Death,' from the moment the first old car falters its way through fog and mist and a voice that belongs to Humphrey Bogart comes out of Peter Falk." Stanley Eichelbaum of the San Francisco Examiner said that "there's so much enjoyable nonsense in "Murder By Death," which opens today at the Cinema 21, I suppose it doesn't matter that Neil Simon's spoof of Hollywood and British detective mysteries is a thin, somewhat labored invention. Before it begins to sag and run out of steam, it's a delightful lark, and, even with shortcomings, the funniest, looniest film of the year." Edward L. Blank of The Pittsburgh Press said "it surpasses 'Barefoot in the Park' and 'The Odd Couple' to become his funniest film. In a screenplay calculated to be as absurd as possible, not all the gags work. A running gimmick involving identical rooms never amuses, and the picture ends in a fizzle of senseless surprises. (Don't bother trying to sort it out; Simon's inspiration obviously petered out five minutes too soon.) Most of it works, though, and what does is hilarious."

Giles M. Fowler of the Kansas City Times wrote that "somewhere about midway, the movie sags a bit as the emphasis shifts from broad character to even broader action. When Simon tries to zip up the comedy with wild plot mechanics—none of which it would be fair to divulge here—the situations start to feel strained and repetitive. Much of the humor is recovered in the last scene or two, but I still left with the feeling that 'Murder by Death' falls short of its great potential." Corbin Patrick of The Indianapolis Star wrote that "Simon, hitherto known chiefly for Broadway comedy hits including 'Plaza Suite' and 'The Odd Couple,' makes highly amusing fun of all the cliches of detective fiction in his script for this film. In doing this he's turned a neat trick, making it suspenseful as well as funny. It's a gem of its genre." Susan Stark of the Detroit Free Press said that "the idea behind 'Murder by Death,' Neil Simon's first comedy written expressly for the screen, is to bring together the legendary sleuths for the purpose of having them collaborate on a murder case. A mouthwatering' idea. And its result in some perfectly delicious comedy, based on the pleasure of watching not only Simon's satirical version of the characters interact, but also of watching the stars who play them interact."

Don Morrison wrote in The Minneapolis Star:

"Murder by Death" is one of those rare things—a completely silly prank movie that also happens to be funny. Very funny. Really very funny. Most often, when an all-star cast is assembled to put the spoof on a famous set of characters, the writers and directors seem to think comic results will be automatic and don't bother to give the biggies anything solidly funny to say or do. Such humor as is fabricated for the occasion generally overshoots satire, tries to settle for burlesque and winds up as sophomoric travesty. In this case, with Neil Simon writing the script, comedy isn't taken for granted. Simon knows what's a joke and what isn't. It is burlesque, and very broad burlesque at that, but with a sure touch to it: the terrible jokes are put in because they are terrible (not because some hack thinks they are really amusing). The gaping holes in the plot are part of the silly fun and give you bonus giggles afterwards when you ponder the grand illogic of it all.

Dane Lanken of the Montreal Gazette wrote that the film has "a delightful cast, and the results of letting such a bunch of hams ham it up is delightful, too. Director Robert Moore, who previously directed several of Neil Simon's Broadway hits, makes his film debut here and keeps everything rolling nicely." Barbara Thomas of The Atlanta Journal remarked that "the movie often doesn't make much sense and the trick on the identity of the real Lionel Twain ends on a murky note. However, it's quite possible one wouldn’t notice such a substantial flaw for all the puns and comedy afoot. There are a few clues to add to spice up the plot. [...] The screenplay is an original from Simon, a favorite of folks who like their laughs quick and obvious. It’s among the better of his works and serves as the basis for a delightful film." Richard Dyer of The Boston Globe wrote that "none of the plot and incident, in fact, is important in this movie: they exist as opportunities to give big-name actors a lot of showy opportunities. Director Roger [sic] Moore made his name by creating the superb ensemble playing in the original stage production of "The Boys in the Band," but there is little ensemble here just a series of star turns. Falk's broad Bogart burlesque has its moments, but Niven and Smith consistently fare best because they appreciate the value of understatement; James Coco certainly does not. Capote, in his screen debut — but hardly his acting debut — lisps mechanically through his role (is his real name Lionel Train?) and he looks like a malevolent mongoose. Essentially, though, this is Neil Simon's movie his name, in fact, is part of the title. No one writes a better gag-line than he does: some of the movie is hilarious."

Clyde Gilmour offered a more negative view of the film in the Toronto Star, saying that "Murder by Death seems to me to offer three or four good laughs and half a dozen chuckles. True enough, that’s a lot better than no laughs at all. But it’s still a deplorably thin cargo of mirth in a 93-minute entertainment from the pen of the erstwhile merry fellow who gave the world Barefoot in the Park and The Odd Couple. Not to mention his new smash-hit on Broadway, California Suite."

=== International reviews ===
Arthur Thirkell of the Daily Mirror in the UK called the film "a clever, fun-filled parody of five well-known fictional detectives Charlie Chan, The Thin Man, Miss Marple, Sam Spade and Hercule Poirot. Mr. Simon has altered the names, but retained the flavour of each tec's individual style and dialogue. The result is a movie that will tickle the fancy of Agatha Christie and Dashiell Hammett fans and get chuckles from those usually cynically disposed towards corny, contrived sleuthing in fog-shrouded mansions."

Eric Shorter of The Daily Telegraph said that "the pleasure lies in the acting, or rather the impersonations, of legendary sleuths such as Charlie Chan (Peter Sellers), Humphrey Bogart (Peter Falk), Miss Marple (Elsa Lanchester), and so on, rather than in the relentless verbal gagging of Mr Simon or his teasing of thriller conventions."

Alexander Walker of the London Evening Standard said that "the high risk that critics run in reviewing Nell Simon screenplays Is an addiction to reviewing every Joke, which means taking down the whole dialogue verbatim. The risk eminently worth running, for this is a prime piece of malice aforethought that debunks the genre and, like its title, turns expectations back to front in that arrogant that detective-story authors do to reader-addicts."

Derek Malcolm of The Guardian described the film as having "a lot of crisp, semi-witty lines from one and all and a great deal of slightly over-ripe characterisation. It's all very theatrical and none too cinematic, since Robert Moore, a director new to me, is no George Cukor—and that splendid veteran is the only person who could turn this type of clever charade into something more than a series of actorly turns."

Romola Costantino wrote in The Sun-Herald that the "picture reinforces a trust that top performers don't let you down. An amazing performer in authorship, is playwright Neil Simon, who has brought enough laughter into the world in recent years to deserve some special award. Here he tackles a tricky subject, because murder story spoofs can turn out tedious; but Simon's magic touch doesn't fail him in this screenplay. Silly though they may sound, he makes the following angles hilariously funny: eerie old Gothic house, murder on the stroke of 12, screams in the night, a sinister butler, black-gloved hands groping around corners, guests trapped with no way out, gathering of famous detectives modelled on the best fictional master-minds, and a series of red-herring solutions to the mind-boggling whodunit mystery. Backing up Simon's brilliance is an unbeatable cast of stylish actors whose names guarantee entertainment. [...] Absurdity is very amusing when it is topped off with this kind of elegance."

Colin Bennett of The Age wrote that "by the end, after automatic daggers and shrinking rooms, scorpions and poisoned wine, and unmasked plastic corpses, the whodunit revelations have grown hopelessly tortuous. We can’t follow them. We are not meant to care and we don’t. For once, Neil Simon is writing his jokes without point or social observation, simply for the sake of easy laughter, comic pastiche at the expense of detective authors who cheat their readers. His characters are as thin as the Charles Addams cartoons that accompany the credits. Which is why I call Murder by Death a throwaway. You will chuckle for most of the hour and a half then forget it."

== Award nominations ==
Year	Award	Category	Subject	Result
1977	Golden Globe Awards	Best Acting Debut in a Motion Picture – Male	Truman Capote	Nominated
1977	Writers Guild of America Awards	Best Comedy Written Directly for the Screen	Neil Simon	Nominated

== See also ==
- The Cheap Detective, a 1978 film featuring Falk, Brennan, Coco, and Cromwell, also written by Simon and directed by Moore
- Clue, a 1985 murder-mystery comedy featuring Brennan
- Ten Little Indians by Agatha Christie, a mystery novel with similar setting
- "And Then There Were Fewer", Family Guy episode with similar setting
- List of films featuring the deaf and hard of hearing
