= The Goodbye Girl =

1977 film directed by Herbert Ross

- Theatrical release poster
- Directed by: Herbert Ross
- Written by: Neil Simon
- Produced by: Ray Stark
- Starring: Richard Dreyfuss; Marsha Mason; Quinn Cummings
- Cinematography: David M. Walsh
- Edited by: John F. Burnett
- Music by: Dave Grusin
- Production companies: Metro-Goldwyn-Mayer (uncredited); Rastar
- Distributed by: Warner Bros.
- Release date: November 30, 1977
- Running time: 110 minutes
- Country: United States
- Language: English
- Box office: $102 million

The Goodbye Girl is a 1977 American romantic comedy-drama film directed by Herbert Ross, written by Neil Simon and starring Richard Dreyfuss, Marsha Mason, Quinn Cummings and Paul Benedict. The film, produced by Ray Stark, centers on an odd trio of characters: a struggling actor who has sublet a Manhattan apartment from a friend, the current occupant (his friend's ex-girlfriend, who has just been abandoned), and her precocious young daughter.

Richard Dreyfuss won the 1977 Academy Award for Best Actor for his performance as Elliot Garfield. At the time, he became the youngest man (at age 30) to win an Oscar for Best Actor. Both Mason and Cummings were nominated for Oscars.

The film became the first romantic comedy to earn $100 million in box-office grosses.

== Plot ==
Former chorus girl and divorcee Paula McFadden and her ten-year-old daughter, Lucy, live in a Manhattan apartment with Paula's married boyfriend, Tony DeForrest. Coming home from shopping, Paula finds a letter from Tony explaining that he has deserted her to travel to Italy for a film role, leaving her devastated. Paula soon learns that prior to his departure, Tony sublet the apartment to his friend Elliot Garfield, a quirky but sweet aspiring actor from Chicago, who arrives in the middle of the night, unaware of the situation and expecting to move in. Although Elliot has already paid three months' rent, Paula turns him away, but after he calls her from a payphone across the street in the pouring rain and begs her to let him stay, she reluctantly agrees to share the apartment with him.

Over the next few days, Paula and Elliot often clash over his eccentric habits, including meditative chants in the morning, late-night guitar playing, and sleeping in the nude. Now penniless, Paula attempts to resume her career as a dancer, but she struggles to get back into shape and is rejected in an audition in favor of younger women. Meanwhile, Elliot has landed the title role in an off-off-Broadway production of Richard III, but the director, Mark, wants him to play Richard III of England as an exaggerated homosexual stereotype. Reluctantly, Elliot agrees to the nontraditional portrayal, despite knowing that it may result in the end of his acting career.

When Paula and Elliot encounter each other in a grocery store, they amicably agree to split the bill. Afterwards, Paula is robbed, and after Elliot fails to recover her purse, which contains the last of her savings, she lashes out at him. However, the two soon begin to warm up to each other, and Paula attends the premiere of Richard III with Lucy. Later that night, Elliot returns home intoxicated after reading scathing reviews of his performance, and Paula consoles him. The next morning, Elliot is informed that the play is canceled, much to his relief.

Returning home one night from his job as a doorman at a strip club, where he is punched by a drunk patron, Elliot makes advances towards Paula, who is amused but insists she has no time for romance. The following evening, Elliot surprises Paula with a romantic rooftop dinner, and after taking shelter from the rain, they sleep together. The next morning, Lucy is displeased with the new relationship; Paula and Lucy both fear another heartbreak, but Elliot convinces Paula that he is not going anywhere. Later that day, Elliot picks up Lucy from school and takes her on a horse-drawn carriage ride, during which she admits she likes him, and he tells her how much he cares for her and her mother.

Elliot lands a job with an improvisational group and Paula begins to redecorate the apartment for a fresh beginning. Elliot is soon spotted by a well-known film director, who offers him a film role in Seattle. When Paula learns that Elliot will be away for four weeks, she worries that he will leave her like all the other men in her life, but he assures Paula that he will be back after the shoot. Later that night, he calls Paula from the payphone outside their apartment and invites her to go with him while he is filming. Paula declines but is encouraged by the invitation, saying that his asking her is enough and he will come home to a cozy finished home. Before hanging up, Elliot asks Paula to have his prized guitar restrung, which she takes as proof that he really loves her and will return. Paula climbs onto the fire escape in the pouring rain and proclaims her love for Elliot before he rides away in a taxi.

== Cast ==
- Richard Dreyfuss as Elliot Garfield
- Marsha Mason as Paula McFadden
- Quinn Cummings as Lucy McFadden
- Paul Benedict as Mark Bodine
- Barbara Rhoades as Donna Douglas
- Theresa Merritt as Mrs. Crosby
- Michael Shawn as Ronnie Burns
- Patricia Pearcy as Rhonda Fontana
- Raymond J. Barry (credited as Ray Barry) as Richard III cast member
- Powers Boothe as Richard III cast member
- Tom Everett as Richard III cast member
- Joe Regalbuto (credited as Joseph Regalbuto) as Richard III cast member
- Nicol Williamson as Oliver Fry (uncredited)

== Production ==
The film began as a screenplay called Bogart Slept Here (essentially the story of what happened to Dustin Hoffman after he became a star) that was to star Robert De Niro and Mason for Warner Bros. It would have been the film De Niro made immediately after Taxi Driver. Mike Nichols was hired to direct.

Simon recalled the original idea for the film:

The basic idea of the story was that Marsha, an ex-dancer, was married to a very promising but struggling off-Broadway actor who gets discovered in a small play and is whisked out to Hollywood, where he reluctantly moves with his family. He feels very out of place there ... and they have trouble adjusting, especially after his first film makes him an international star...and it creates chaos in their marriage. The story was coming out a little darker than I had imagined, but I envisioned the character of the wife as a very good role for Marsha.

Filming began on Bogart Slept Here but it became apparent that De Niro was not right for the role. Simon recalled: "... it was clear that any of the humor I had written was going to get lost. It's not that De Niro is not funny, but his humor comes mostly from his nuances, a bemused expression on his face or the way he would look at a character, smile and then look up at the ceiling." Nichols insisted on recasting De Niro. As De Niro recalled “I didn’t know certain types of things, it was a certain type of comedy—Neil Simon—the timing had to be a certain way, I didn’t feel enthused by it ... It wasn’t working. I shot for about two weeks. I had about three times in my life where I had that experience with a director, where we can’t make them happy—so this was one of them. I was sitting in my camper, you feel this dread. I was going to offer my salary to keep us going for another week of rehearsals. [Nichols] said 'I think we’re going to have to end it.' He felt terrible. He was really upset.” Soon after, Nichols left the project.

Dreyfuss was brought in to audition with Mason. At the end of the reading, Simon decided the chemistry was there, but the script needed work. He rewrote the screenplay in six weeks.

[The screenplay] had to be funnier, more romantic, the way Marsha and I first imagined the picture would be. What I wanted to do was a prequel. In other words, instead of an off-Broadway actor, married with a child, why don't I start from the beginning? I'd start when they first meet. Not liking each other at first and then falling in love.

The film's exteriors were filmed in New York City and the interiors were shot on sets in Los Angeles. Warner Bros. was less than enthused about Simon's script and considered selling the project to Metro-Goldwyn-Mayer, but the studio ultimately decided to partner with MGM on the film instead. With the 1996 acquisition of Turner Entertainment Company, which owned the pre-May 1986 MGM film library by Time Warner, Warner Bros. now owns the rights and distribution of the film.

== Soundtrack ==
The title song, "Goodbye Girl", was written and performed by David Gates in 1977, and was a top 20 hit on the Billboard Hot 100 chart in 1977/78, peaking at #15.

== Reception ==
Roger Ebert gave the film a mostly favorable review, awarding three stars out of four. He was unimpressed with Mason's performance and the character as written, calling it "hardly ever sympathetic." However, he praised Dreyfuss and cited his Richard III scenes as "the funniest in a movie since Mel Brooks staged Springtime for Hitler." Ebert criticized the beginning as "awkward at times and never quite involving," but "enjoyed its conclusion so much that we almost forgot our earlier reservations." Gene Siskel awarded an identical three-star grade and said, "Make no mistake about it, the very best thing about 'The Goodbye Girl' is the character of Elliot Garfield as played by Dreyfuss, a character that comes very close to Dreyfuss' own self-and-profession centered lifestyle. But like Dreyfuss himself, Elliott Garfield, who initially comes off as [a] pushy, prickly type, ultimately wins you over." Vincent Canby of The New York Times found the film to be "exhausting without being much fun" and "relentlessly wisecracked." Charles Champlin of The Los Angeles Times lauded it as "the best and most blissfully satisfying romantic comedy of the year and then some."

Arthur D. Murphy of Variety called the film "another feather in Herbert Ross' directorial cap," with Dreyfuss giving "his best screen performance to date." Gary Arnold of The Washington Post wrote that the film "evolves into the most satisfying comedy Simon has written directly for the movies. One tolerates the plot mechanics for the sake of the genuinely amusing aspects of his script, the bright remarks and the distinctive or appealing character traits that provide good performers with live ammunition." Pauline Kael of The New Yorker was negative, commenting, "It's not Neil Simon's one-liners that get you down in The Goodbye Girl, it's his two-liners. The snappiness of the exchanges is so forced it's almost macabre." David Ansen of Newsweek wrote, "It's pure formula, and Simon plays it straight, all cards on the table, with the conservative professionalism of a gambler used to winning. As directed by the ubiquitous Herbert Ross, The Goodbye Girl is a modest, bittersweet comedy that will delight Simon fans and leave his critics staunchly unconverted."

On the review aggregator website Rotten Tomatoes, 77% of 26 critics' reviews are positive, with an average rating of 6.7/10.

=== Accolades ===
Richard Dreyfuss was 30 when he won the Academy Award for Best Actor, making him the youngest actor ever to win the category. This record stood for 25 years until 2002 when Adrien Brody—just one month shy of his 30th birthday—won for The Pianist.

Award	Category	Recipient(s)	Result	Ref.
Academy Awards	Best Picture	Ray Stark	Nominated	
Academy Awards	Best Actor	Richard Dreyfuss	Won	
Academy Awards	Best Actress	Marsha Mason	Nominated	
Academy Awards	Best Supporting Actress	Quinn Cummings	Nominated	
Academy Awards	Best Screenplay – Written Directly for the Screen; Based on Factual Material or on Story Material; Not Previously Published or Produced	Neil Simon	Nominated	
British Academy Film Awards	Best Actor in a Leading Role	Richard Dreyfuss	Won	
British Academy Film Awards	Best Actress in a Leading Role	Marsha Mason	Nominated	
British Academy Film Awards	Best Screenplay	Neil Simon	Nominated	
David di Donatello Awards	Best Foreign Director	Herbert Ross	Won (Note: Tied with Ridley Scott for The Duellists.)	
David di Donatello Awards	Best Foreign Actor	Richard Dreyfuss	Won	
Golden Globe Awards	Best Motion Picture – Musical or Comedy	The Goodbye Girl	Won	
Golden Globe Awards	Best Actor in a Motion Picture – Musical or Comedy	Richard Dreyfuss	Won	
Golden Globe Awards	Best Actress in a Motion Picture – Musical or Comedy	Marsha Mason	Won (Note: Tied with Diane Keaton for Annie Hall.)	
Golden Globe Awards	Best Supporting Actress – Motion Picture	Quinn Cummings	Nominated	
Golden Globe Awards	Best Screenplay – Motion Picture	Neil Simon	Won	
Japan Academy Film Prize	Outstanding Foreign Language Film	The Goodbye Girl	Nominated	
Kansas City Film Critics Circle Awards	Best Actor	Richard Dreyfuss	Won	
Los Angeles Film Critics Association Awards	Best Actor	Richard Dreyfuss	Won	
Writers Guild of America Awards	Best Comedy – Written Directly for the Screen	Neil Simon	Nominated	

American Film Institute

- AFI's 100 Years...100 Passions – #81

== Musical and remake ==
There were three failed attempts to turn The Goodbye Girl into a half-hour, television sitcom, according to Lee Goldberg's book Unsold Television Pilots. The first pilot, aired on NBC in May 1982 and titled Goodbye Doesn't Mean Forever, starred Karen Valentine and Michael Lembeck, and was directed by James Burrows from a script by Allan Katz. The second, unaired pilot was produced a year later starring JoBeth Williams and was directed by Charlotte Brown from a script by Brown and Pat Nardo. The third pilot, which never aired, again starred Valentine and was directed by Jay Sandrich.

The Goodbye Girl was developed into a 1993 Broadway musical of the same name starring Martin Short and Bernadette Peters.

A 2004 remake with Jeff Daniels and Patricia Heaton keeps the screenplay from the original version.

== Home media ==
The VHS format has been released several times over the years. MGM/UA Home Video released the 1993 and 1996 versions, while Warner Home Video released the 2000 version in addition to releasing the DVD version. A manufacture-on-demand Blu-ray format was released through Warner Archive Collection on November 8, 2016. The film is available also via streaming through various services.
