= James Coco =

American stage and screen actor (1930–1987)

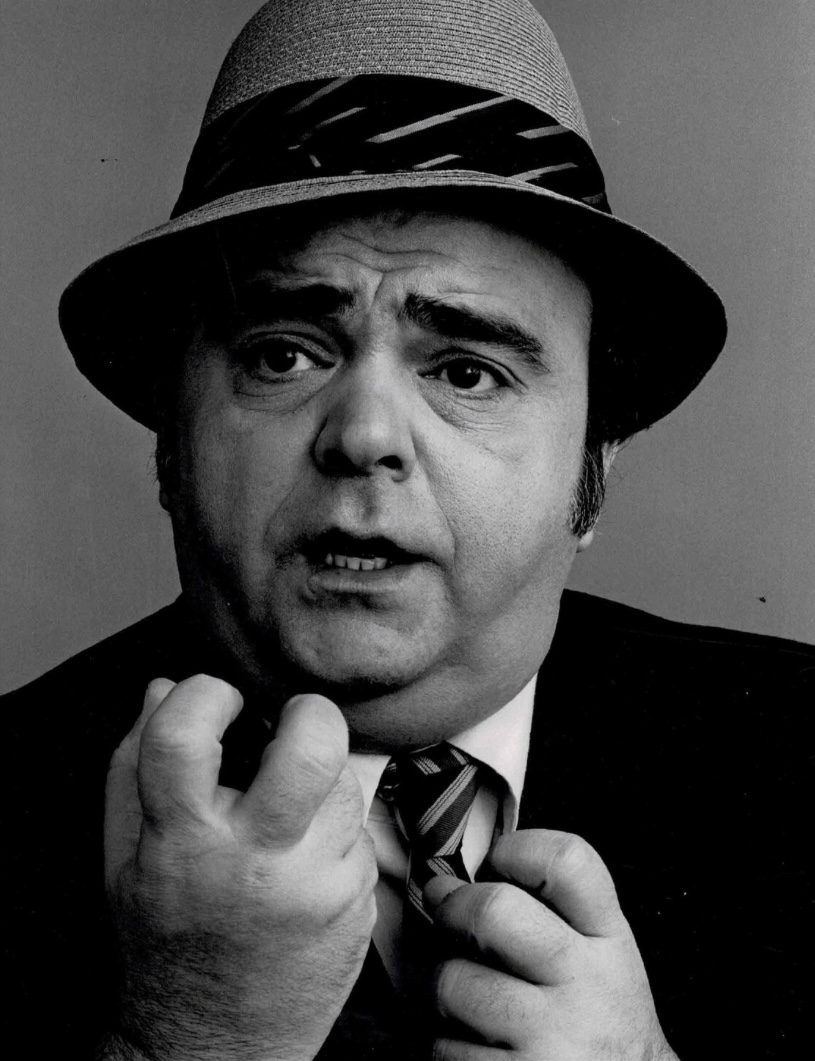
- Coco in Calucci's Department, 1973
- Born: James Emil Lescoco; March 21, 1930; Little Italy, Manhattan, New York, U.S.
- Died: February 25, 1987 (aged 56); Manhattan, New York, U.S.
- Resting place: Saint Gertrude Cemetery; Colonia, New Jersey, U.S.
- Occupation: Actor
- Years active: 1947–1987

James Emil Coco (March 21, 1930 – February 25, 1987) was an American stage and screen actor. He was the recipient of a Primetime Emmy Award, a Drama Desk Award, a Cable ACE Award and three Obie Awards, as well as nominations for a Tony Award, an Academy Award and two Golden Globe Awards. Coco is remembered for his supporting roles in the films Man of La Mancha (1972), Murder by Death (1976) and Only When I Laugh (1981).

== Early life and career ==
Born in the Little Italy section of Manhattan, Coco was the son of Felice Lescoco, a shoemaker, and Ida Detestes Lescoco. The family moved to the Pelham Bay section of The Bronx when he was an infant, where he lived until his late teens. Coco began acting straight out of high school. He received his acting training at HB Studio in New York City. As an overweight and prematurely balding adult, he found himself relegated to character roles. He made his Broadway debut in Hotel Paradiso in 1957, but his first major recognition was for Off-Broadway's The Moon in Yellow River by Denis Johnston, for which he won an Obie Award.

In 1964 Coco toured with a production of The Irregular Verb to Love, with Cyril Richard, and they appeared at the oldest Summer stock theater, Denver's Elitch Theatre.

Coco's first modern collaboration with playwright Terrence McNally was a 1968 Off-Broadway double-bill of the one-act plays Sweet Eros and Witness, followed by Here's Where I Belong, a disastrous Broadway musical adaptation of East of Eden that closed on opening night. They had far greater success with their next project, Next, a two-character play with Elaine Shore, which ran for more than 700 performances and won Coco the Drama Desk Award for Outstanding Performance. Sixteen years later, the two reunited for the Manhattan Theatre Club production of It's Only a Play.

Coco also achieved success with Neil Simon, who wrote The Last of the Red Hot Lovers (1969) specifically for him. It earned him a Tony Award nomination as Best Actor in a Play. The two later joined forces for a Broadway revival of the musical Little Me and the films Murder by Death (1976), The Cheap Detective (1978) and Only When I Laugh (1981), for which he was both Oscar-nominated and Razzie-nominated.

Coco, a veteran of many failed diets, was the author of the bestselling book The James Coco Diet, released on February 1, 1983, which documented his successful experience of the Structure House Weight Loss Plan, developed by Gerard Musante. However, he only lived four years after the release of his book.

== Film and television roles ==
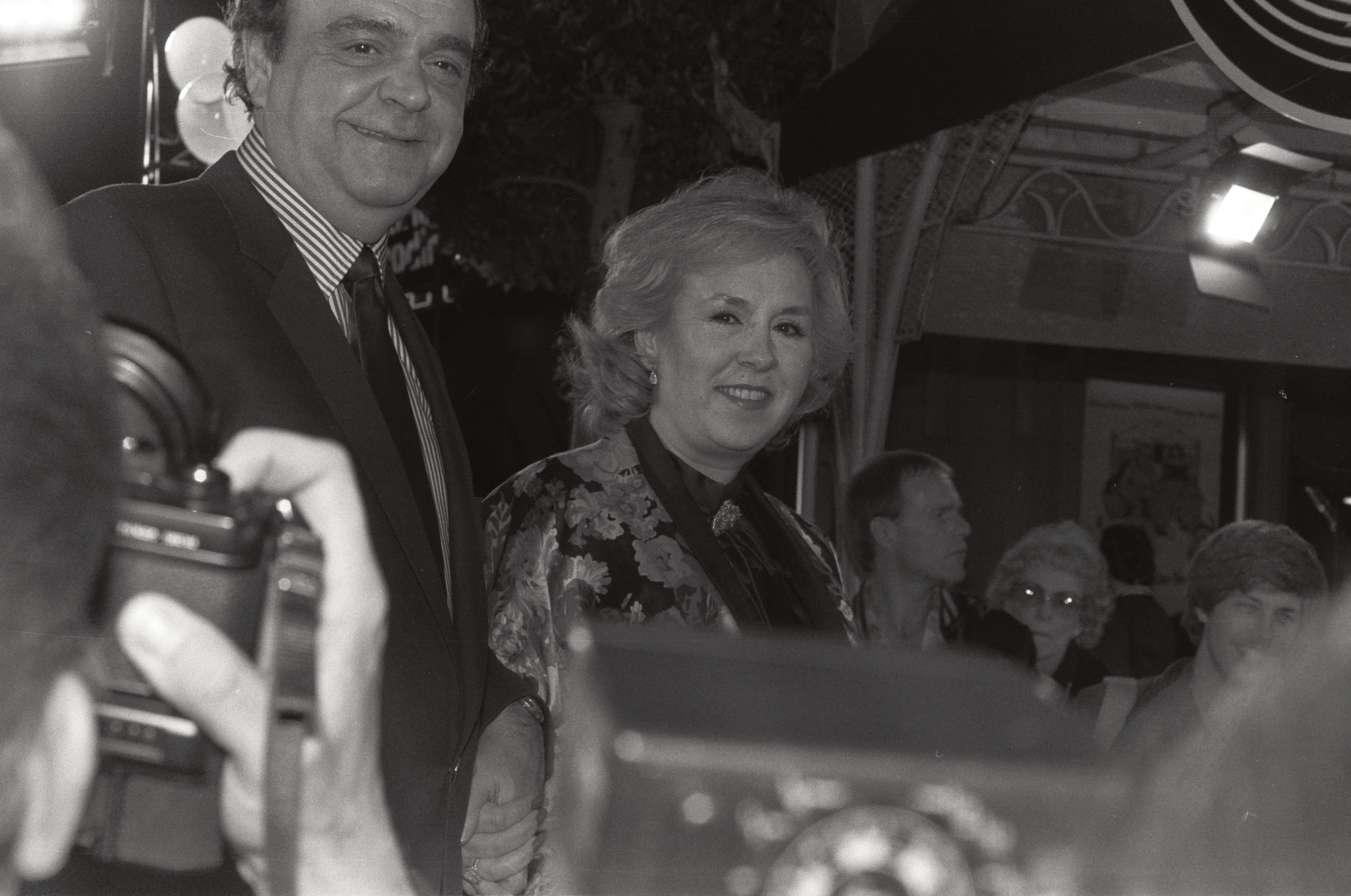
Coco with Doris Roberts at the premiere of Seems Like Old Times in 1980, taken by Alan Light

Coco's additional film credits include Ensign Pulver (1964), The Patty Duke Show (1965). End of the Road (1970), The Strawberry Statement (1970), Tell Me That You Love Me, Junie Moon (1970), A New Leaf (1971), Such Good Friends (1971), Man of La Mancha (1972), The Wild Party (1975), Charleston (1977), Scavenger Hunt (1979), Wholly Moses! (1980) and The Muppets Take Manhattan (1984).

Several of his films were released posthumously, including: Hunk (1987) and That's Adequate (1989).

On television, Coco starred on two unsuccessful 1970s series, Calucci's Department and The Dumplings, and made guest appearances on many series, including ABC Stage 67, NBC Children's Theater, The Edge of Night, Marcus Welby, M.D., Trapper John, M.D., Medical Center, Maude, Fantasy Island, Alice, The Eddie Capra Mysteries, Murder, She Wrote, The Muppet Show, The Carol Burnett Show, The Love Boat, $weepstake$, and St. Elsewhere, for which he won an Emmy Award. One of his later television assignments was a recurring role as Nick Milano on the sitcom Who's the Boss?. Coco died exactly one day after what was his final appearance on Who's the Boss? was broadcast.

== Awards and nominations ==
| Year | Award | Category | Nominated work | Result |
|---|---|---|---|---|
| 1961 | 6th Obie Awards | Distinguished Performance by an Actor | The Moon in the Yellow River | Won |
| 1968 | 13th Obie Awards | Distinguished Performance | Fragments | Won |
| 1969 | 14th Drama Desk Awards | Outstanding Performance | Adaptation/Next | Won |
| 1970 | 24th Tony Awards | Best Actor in a Play | Last of the Red Hot Lovers | Nominated |
| 1973 | 30th Golden Globe Awards | Best Supporting Actor – Motion Picture | Man of La Mancha | Nominated |
| 1977 | 22nd Obie Awards | Distinguished Performance | The Transfiguration of Benno Blimpie | Won |
| 1982 | 39th Golden Globe Awards | Best Supporting Actor – Motion Picture | Only When I Laugh | Nominated |
| 1982 | 54th Academy Awards | Best Supporting Actor | Only When I Laugh | Nominated |
| 1982 | 2nd Golden Raspberry Awards | Worst Supporting Actor | Only When I Laugh | Nominated |
| 1983 | 35th Primetime Emmy Awards | Outstanding Supporting Actor in a Drama Series | St. Elsewhere, (Episode: "Cora and Arnie") | Won |
| 1985 | 7th CableACE Awards | Best Actor in a Dramatic Series | The Ray Bradbury Theater, (Episode: "Marionettes, Inc.") | Won |

== Personal life ==
Nine years after Coco's death, it was revealed that he was gay.

== Death ==
Coco died at St. Vincent's Hospital, Manhattan, on February 25, 1987, at age 56 after suffering a heart attack at his Greenwich Village home. He is buried in St. Gertrude's Roman Catholic Cemetery in Colonia, New Jersey.

== Works ==
- Coco, James; Paone, Marion (1984). The James Coco Diet. Bantam Books. ISBN 978-0-553-05024-0.

== Filmography ==
- Ensign Pulver (1964) - Skouras
- Patty Duke Show (1965) - Director
- Generation (1969) - Mr. Blatto
- End of the Road (1970) - School Man
- The Strawberry Statement (1970) – Grocer
- Tell Me That You Love Me, Junie Moon (1970) – Mario
- A New Leaf (1971) – Uncle Harry
- Such Good Friends (1971) – Timmy
- Man of La Mancha (1972) – Sancho Panza / Cervantes's Manservant
- VD Blues (1972) – Himself
- Calucci's Department (1973) – Joe Calucci
- The Wild Party (1975) – Jolly Grimm
- Murder by Death (1976) – Milo Perrier
- Charleston (1977) – Joe Lo Monaco
- Bye Bye Monkey (1978) – Andreas Flaxman
- The Cheap Detective (1978) – Marcel
- The Muppet Show (1978) – Himself (Special Guest Star)
- Scavenger Hunt (1979) – Henri
- Wholly Moses! (1980) – Hyssop
- Only When I Laugh (1981) – Jimmy Perrino
- The Muppets Take Manhattan (1984) – Mr. Skeffington
- Johnny Dangerously (1984) – Moronie's Bouncer (uncredited)
- The Ray Bradbury Theater (1985) – "Marionettes, Inc." (Season 1, Episode 1), John Braling
- Hunk (1987) – Dr. D (posthumous release)
- The Chair (1988) – Dr. Harold Woodhouse Langer (posthumous release)
- That's Adequate (1989) – Max Roebling (final film role, posthumous release)
