= Robert Moore (director) =

American film director

- Born: February 1, 1927; Detroit, Michigan, U.S.
- Died: May 10, 1984 (aged 57); New York City, New York, U.S.
- Occupations: Theatre director, film director
- Awards: Drama Desk Awards; Outstanding Director; 1968 The Boys in the Band

Robert Moore (February 1, 1927 – May 10, 1984) was an American stage, film and television director and actor.

== Biography ==
Born in Detroit, Michigan, Moore studied at the Catholic University of America Drama Department under Gilbert V. Hartke. He is best known for his direction of the ground-breaking play The Boys in the Band, his Broadway productions (which garnered him five Tony Award nominations), and his collaborations - three plays and three films - with Neil Simon, including the detective spoofs Murder By Death and The Cheap Detective.

As an actor, he played a disabled gay man opposite Liza Minnelli in the 1970 drama Tell Me That You Love Me, Junie Moon, appeared in two episodes of Valerie Harper's sitcom Rhoda (for which he also directed 26 episodes), in one episode of The Mary Tyler Moore Show (as Phyllis' gay brother) and was a regular on Diana Rigg's short-lived 1973 sitcom Diana. His other television directing credits include The Bob Newhart Show and the 1976 production of Cat on a Hot Tin Roof with Natalie Wood, Robert Wagner, Laurence Olivier, and Maureen Stapleton.

Moore died of AIDS-related pneumonia in New York City on May 10, 1984.

== Work ==
Theatre

- Promises, Promises (1968)
- The Last of the Red Hot Lovers (1969)
- The Gingerbread Lady (1970)
- Lorelei (1974)
- My Fat Friend (1974)
- Deathtrap (1978)
- They're Playing Our Song (1979)
- Woman of the Year (1981)

=== Filmography ===
Film

- Murder by Death (1976)
- The Cheap Detective (1978)
- Chapter Two (1979)

Television

- Diana (1973) – TV series
- Thursday's Game (1974) – TV movie
- The Bob Newhart Show (1974) – TV series
- Rhoda (1974–1975) – TV series
- Don't Call Us (1976) – TV movie
- Cat on a Hot Tin Roof (1976) – TV movie
- There's Always Room (1977) – TV movie
- The Sunshine Boys (1977) – TV movie
- The Natural Look (1977) – TV movie
- Annie Flynn (1978) – TV movie
- It's Not Easy (1983) – TV series

Actor

- Tell Me That You Love Me, Junie Moon (1970) – Warren
- The Mary Tyler Moore Show (1973) – Ben Sutherland (1 episode)
- Diana (1973) – Marshall Tyler (7 episodes)
- Rhoda (1974–1976) – Lowell Snyder; Mr. Graham (2 episodes)

== Awards and nominations ==
Awards

- 1968 Drama Desk Award for Outstanding Direction of a Play – The Boys in the Band

Nominations

- 1969 Tony Award for Best Direction of a Musical – Promises, Promises
- 1970 Tony Award for Best Direction of a Play – Last of the Red Hot Lovers
- 1978 Tony Award for Best Direction of a Play – Deathtrap
- 1979 Tony Award for Best Direction of a Musical – They're Playing Our Song
- 1981 Tony Award for Best Direction of a Musical – Woman of the Year
