= List of awards and nominations received by Neil Simon =

List of Neil Simon awards
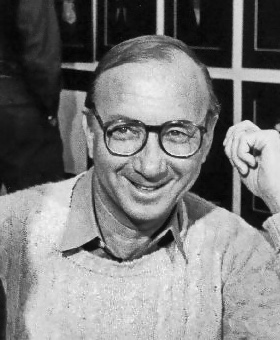
Award	Wins	Nominations
Academy Awards	0	4
Primetime Emmy Award	0	4
Golden Globe Award	1	3
Tony Award	4	14

This article is a List of awards and nominations received by Neil Simon.

Neil Simon was an American playwright, screenwriter and author. He has received numerous accolades including a Pulitzer Prize, four Tony Awards and a Golden Globe Award as well as nominations for four Academy Awards and four Primetime Emmy Awards. He has received several honorary awards such as the American Theatre Hall of Fame in 1983, the Kennedy Center Honors in 1995 and the Mark Twain Prize for American Humor in 2006.

== Major associations ==
=== Academy Awards ===
Year	Category	Nominated work	Result	Ref.
1968	Best Adapted Screenplay	The Odd Couple	Nominated	
1975	Best Adapted Screenplay	The Sunshine Boys	Nominated	
1977	Best Original Screenplay	The Goodbye Girl	Nominated	
1978	Best Adapted Screenplay	California Suite	Nominated	

=== Emmy Awards ===
Year	Category	Nominated work	Result	Ref.
1957	Outstanding Writing for a Variety Special	Caesar's Hour	Nominated	
1958	Outstanding Writing for a Variety Special	Caesar's Hour	Nominated	
1992	Outstanding Writing for a Limited Series or Special	Broadway Bound	Nominated	
2001	Outstanding Television Movie	Laughter on the 23rd Floor	Nominated	

=== Tony Awards ===
Year	Category	Nominated work	Result	Ref.
1963	Best Musical	Little Me	Nominated	
1964	Best Play	Barefoot in the Park	Nominated	
1965	Best Play	The Odd Couple	Nominated	
1965	Best Author	The Odd Couple	Won	
1968	Best Play	Plaza Suite	Nominated	
1970	Best Play	Last of the Red Hot Lovers	Nominated	
1972	Best Play	The Prisoner of Second Avenue	Nominated	
1973	Best Play	The Sunshine Boys	Nominated	
1975	Special Tony Award	—	Received	
1978	Best Play	Chapter Two	Nominated	
1979	Best Book of a Musical	They're Playing Our Song	Nominated	
1985	Best Play	Biloxi Blues	Won	
1987	Best Play	Broadway Bound	Nominated	
1991	Best Play	Lost in Yonkers	Won	

=== Golden Globe Awards ===
Year	Category	Nominated work	Result	Ref.
1972	Best Screenplay – Motion Picture	The Heartbreak Kid	Nominated	
1975	Best Screenplay – Motion Picture	The Sunshine Boys	Nominated	
1977	Best Screenplay – Motion Picture	The Goodbye Girl	Won	

== Miscellaneous awards ==
=== American Comedy Awards ===
Year	Category	Nominated work	Result	Ref.
1989	Lifetime Achievement		Received	

=== Drama Desk Awards ===
Year	Category	Nominated work	Result	Ref.
1991	Outstanding New Play	Lost in Yonkers	Won	

=== Evening Standard Theatre Awards ===
Year	Category	Nominated work	Result	Ref.
1967	Evening Standard Theatre Awards	Sweet Charity	Won	

=== New York Drama Critics' Circle ===
Year	Category	Nominated work	Result	Ref.
1965	Best Play	The Odd Couple	Nominated	
1983	Best Play	Brighton Beach Memoirs	Won	
1985	Best Play	Biloxi Blues	Nominated	

=== Outer Critics Circle Award ===
Year	Category	Nominated work	Result	Ref.
1983	Outer Critics Circle Award	Brighton Beach Memoirs	Won	

=== Pulitzer Prize ===
Year	Category	Nominated work	Result	Ref.
1987	Pulitzer Prize for Drama	Broadway Bound	Nominated	
1991	Pulitzer Prize for Drama	Lost in Yonkers	Won	

=== Writers Guild of America Awards ===
Year	Category	Nominated work	Result	Ref.
1968	Best Written Comedy	Barefoot in the Park	Nominated	
1969	Best Written Comedy	The Odd Couple	Won	
1970	Best Original Screenplay	The Out-of-Towners	Won	
1972	Best Adapted Screenplay	The Heartbreak Kid	Nominated	
1975	Best Adapted Screenplay	The Prisoner of Second Avenue	Nominated	
1975	Best Adapted Screenplay	The Sunshine Boys	Won	
1976	Best Original Screenplay	Murder by Death	Nominated	
1977	Best Original Screenplay	The Goodbye Girl	Nominated	
1978	Best Adapted Screenplay	California Suite	Nominated	
1979	Screen Laurel Award	—	Received	

== Honorary accolades ==
- 1968 Sam S. Shubert Award
- 1972 Cue Entertainer of the Year Award
- 1981 Doctor of Humane Letters from Hofstra University
- 1983 American Theater Hall of Fame
- 1986 New York State Governor's Award
- 1995 Kennedy Center Honoree
- 2006 Mark Twain Prize for American Humor
