= William Ragsdale =

American actor (born 1961)

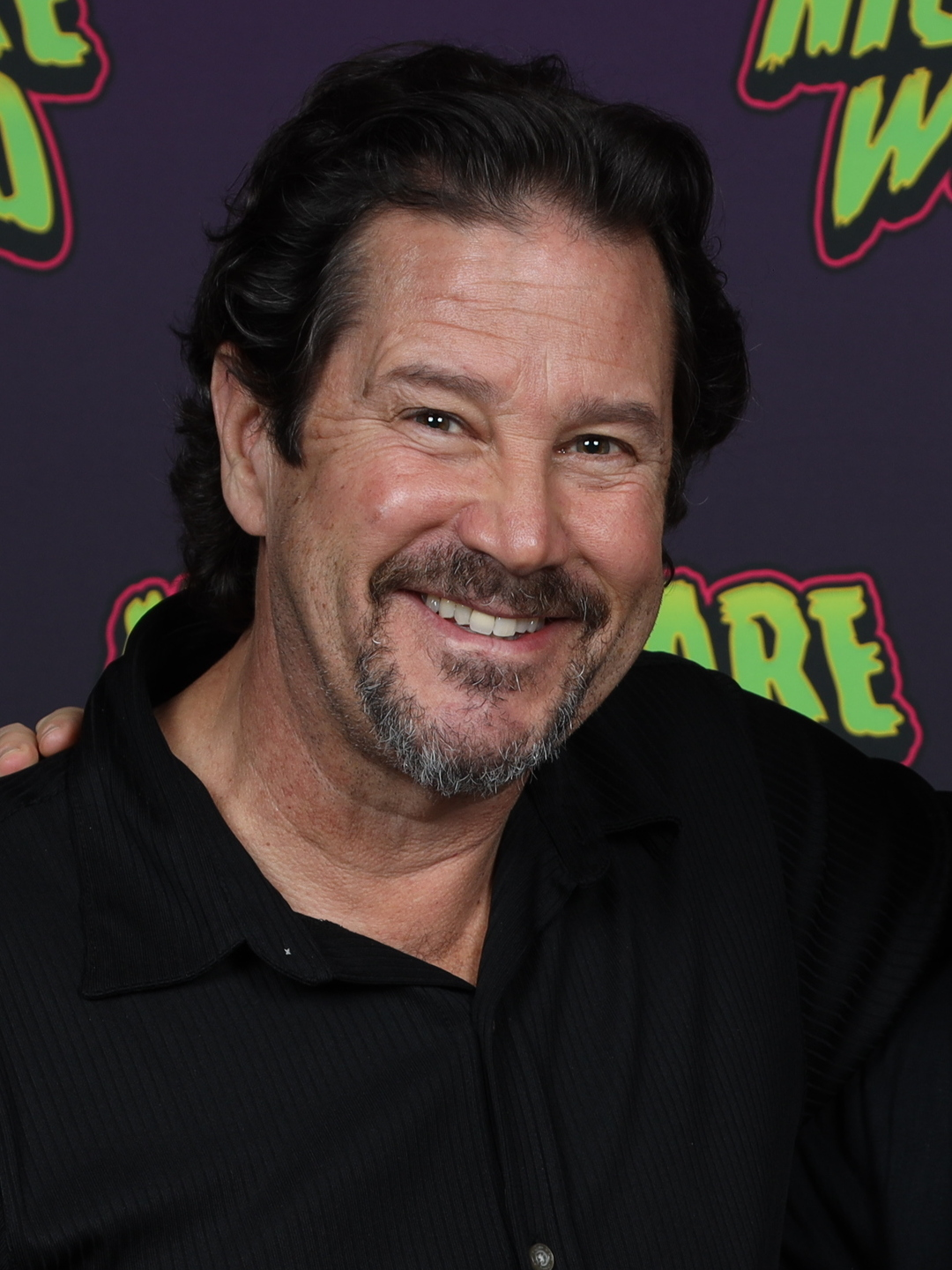
- Ragsdale at Nightmare Weekend Richmond in 2023
- Born: Robert William Ragsdale; January 19, 1961 (age 65); El Dorado, Arkansas, U.S.
- Occupation: Actor
- Years active: 1979–present
- Known for: Fright Night
- Spouse: Andrea Ragsdale (m. 1999)
- Children: 2

Robert William Ragsdale (born January 19, 1961) is an American actor. He is known for playing Charley Brewster in the cult horror-comedy film Fright Night (1985) and its sequel Fright Night Part 2 (1988), and Herman Brooks on the television series Herman's Head (1991–1994).

== Early life and education ==
William Ragsdale was born January 19, 1961, in El Dorado, Arkansas and attended Hendrix College, where he appeared in plays alongside Natalie Canerday.

== Career ==
Ragsdale garnered attention as the Charley Brewster, the young hero of Fright Night and Fright Night Part 2 and onstage in Neil Simon's plays Brighton Beach Memoirs and Biloxi Blues, two of the three parts of Simon's Eugene trilogy, which ends with Broadway Bound. Ragsdale featured in the romance comedy movie Mannequin Two: On the Move (1991).

Ragsdale featured for three years on Herman's Head. He had a brief recurring role in the television series Judging Amy. He played a television producer for Grosse Pointe, which lasted one season. He was cast in the pilot for Charmed, but refused the series to feature in the short-lived situation comedy Brother's Keeper. He appeared on Ellen as the boyfriend of Ellen Morgan (played by Ellen DeGeneres) before her character came out as a lesbian. He has had guest roles on television, including a four-episode stint on Less than Perfect, as well as several feature movie roles.

Ragsdale played the role of Gary Hawkins in 12 episodes of the television series Justified from March 2010 through March 2012 during the series' first three seasons. In 2014, he played Chris Smith in the remake of the movie Left Behind. In 2017, he appeared in the role of Reverend Todd in the Off-Broadway production of Man from Nebraska at the Second Stage Theatre. In 2023, Ragsdale appeared as a vampire-hunting priest in the horror comedy Renfield, a nod to his Fright Night role.

== Filmography ==
=== Film ===
Year	Title	Role
1979	Screams of a Winter Night	Service Station Attendant
1985	Fright Night	Charley Brewster
1985	Smooth Talk	Jeff
1988	Fright Night Part 2	Charley Brewster
1991	Mannequin Two: On the Move	Jason Williamson / Prince William
1998	Just a Little Harmless Sex	Brent
2006	Big Momma's House 2	Bob
2006	Road House 2	Sands Cooper
2006	The Last Time	Rogers
2007	The Reaping	Sheriff Cade
2007	LA Blues	Paul Cooper
2008	What Just Happened	Agent #1
2009	Wonderful World	Buford Parks
2012	Thunderstruck	Joe Newall
2013	Broken City	Mr. Davies
2014	Left Behind	Chris Smith
2018	Alex Strangelove	Ron Truelove
2019	When We Dance the Music Dies	Tom Walton
2023	Knock at the Cabin	Eric's Father
2023	Renfield	Priest
2025	Re-Election	Mr. Polly

=== Television ===
Year	Title	Role	Notes
1984	Santa Barbara	Student	Episode #1.43
1989	Wally and the Valentines	Wally Gillis	Television film
1990	The Bobby & Larry Show	Larry	Television film
1991	Frankenstein: The College Years	Mark Chrisman	Television film
1991–1994	Herman's Head	Herman Brooks	72 episodes
1994–1997	Ellen	Dan	4 episodes
1995	Favorite Deadly Sins	Todd Farrit	Television film
1995	Nowhere Fast	Zack	Television film
1996	Hope & Gloria	Danny Saterfield	2 episodes
1996	Bunk Bed Brothers	Matt Archer	Television film
1997	Faster Baby, Kill	Andrew Kincaid	Episode: "Pilot"
1998–1999	Brother's Keeper	Porter Waide	23 episodes
1999	Starship Regulars	Tycho	Voice; 10 episodes
2000–2001	Grosse Pointe	Rob Fields	17 episodes
2000–2003	Judging Amy	Charles Duff	5 episodes
2003	Miss Match	Russell Dixon	Episode: "Pilot"
2004	Curb Your Enthusiasm	Dr. Anthony Parker	Episode: "The 5 Wood"
2004	Less than Perfect	Mitch Calgrove	4 episodes
2004	The Madam's Family: The Truth About the Canal Street Brothel	B. B. Boudreaux	Television film
2005	Romy and Michele: In the Beginning	Kevin	Television film
2005	The Bad Girl's Guide	Mr. Dooley	Episode: "The Guide to Baby Talk"
2005	Pizza My Heart	Tommy	Television film
2005	Campus Confidential	Principal Glavin	Television film
2006	For One Night	Earl Randall	Television film
2006	Still Standing	Dan Goldman	Episode: "Still Graduating"
2007	Crossing Jordan	Bob	Episode: "Shattered"
2007	The War at Home	Doctor	Episode: "The Graduate"
2007	The Game	Rick	Episode: "The Big Chill"
2007	Desperate Housewives	Scott McKinney	Episode: "What Would We Do Without You?"
2007	Entourage	Frank Giovanello	Episode: "The Day Fuckers"
2008	Without a Trace	Robert Newton	Episode: "Hard Reset"
2008	Medium	Russell Furlong	Episode: "A Cure for What Ails You"
2008	Living Proof	Mark	Television film
2009	Cold Case	Glenn Drew '67	Episode: "The Brush Man"
2010	The Mentalist	Murphy Traver	Episode: "Cackle-Bladder Blood"
2010	CSI: Miami	Kenneth McGuire	Episode: "Manhunt"
2010–2012	Justified	Gary Hawkins	13 episodes
2011	Bird Dog	Deputy Russell Gitz	Television film
2012	CSI: Crime Scene Investigation	Dr. Bill Ryan	Episode: "Tressed to Kill"
2012	Shake It Up	Announcer	Episode: "Judge It Up"
2012	Perception	Dr. Julian Corvis	Episode: "Lovesick"
2012	Touch	Travis Cooper	Episode: "The Road Not Taken"
2013	Necessary Roughness	Dr. Strauss	2 episodes
2013	NCIS	Brett Creevy	Episode: "Oil and Water"
2014	Drop Dead Diva	Alan Peterson	Episode: "Desperate Housewife"
2014	Mistresses	Dr. Blakeley	3 episodes
2014	White Collar	Jack Conroy	Episode: "All's Fair"
2015	Red Band Society	Leo's Father	Episode: "The Guilted Age"
2015	Criminal Minds	Capt. Dale Shavers	Episode: "Lockdown"
2016	Blindspot	Russell Franklin	Episode: "Swift Hardhearted Stone"
2016	BrainDead	Hank Leafton	Episode: "Playing Politics: Living Life in the Shadow of the Budget Showdown - A Critique"
2016	Search Party	Chuck	3 episodes
2016	Elementary	Patrick Moore	Episode: "Pick Your Poison"
2017	A Very Merry Toy Store	Pete Griffin	Television film
2018	Madam Secretary	Peter Gunderson	Episode: "Mitya"
2018	The Good Fight	Rodney Pebbler	Episode: "Day 464"
2019	NOS4A2	Auctioneer	Episode: "Gunbarrel"
2019	Instinct	Lockhart	Episode: "Finders Keepers"
2019	The Deuce	Hoffman	Episode: "This Trust Thing"
2019–2021	Younger	Jeffrey Jacobs	2 episodes
2020	Blue Bloods	Lt. Dean Stafford	Episode: "Vested Interests"
2020	Black-ish	Dr. Chubb	Episode: "Best Supporting Husband"
2021	The Blacklist	Carl Conway	Episode: "The Fribourg Confidence (No. 140)"
2022	WeCrashed	Chris	Episode: "The Power of We"
2023	The Equalizer	Kent	Episode: "Never Again"
2025	The White Lotus	Bart Nixon	Episode: "Same Spirits, New Forms"
2026	Love in Storytown	Mayor Jeff	Television film
2026	Law & Order	Julian Jenca	Episode: "Once Burned"
