= Biloxi Blues =

1984 play written by Neil Simon

- Written by: Neil Simon
- Characters: Roy Selridge; Joseph Wykowski; Don Carney; Eugene Morris Jerome; Arnold Epstein; Sgt. Merwin J. Toomey; James Hennesey; Rowena; Daisy Hannigan
- Original language: English
- Series: Eugene Trilogy: Brighton Beach Memoirs; Biloxi Blues; Broadway Bound
- Subject: A Jewish boy from Brooklyn undergoes basic Army training in the Deep South
- Genre: Comedy
- Setting: Biloxi, Mississippi, 1945

Premiere
- Date premiered: December 8, 1984
- Place premiered: Ahmanson Theatre, Los Angeles

Biloxi Blues is a semi-autobiographical play by Neil Simon. It portrays the conflict of Sergeant Merwin J. Toomey and Arnold Epstein, one of many privates enlisted in the military stationed in Biloxi, Mississippi, seen through the eyes of Eugene Jerome, one of the other soldiers. This play is the second chapter in what is known as his Eugene trilogy, following Brighton Beach Memoirs and preceding Broadway Bound. The play won the Tony Award for Best Play, and Barry Miller won a Tony Award for Best Featured Actor in a Play for his performance as Arnold Epstein.

== Plot overview ==
The story begins with 18-year-old Eugene Morris Jerome from Brooklyn, who is drafted into the United States Army during World War II and is sent to Biloxi, Mississippi for basic training. There he meets a diverse assortment of soldiers, including the gentle and intelligent Arnold Epstein, who is the play's central figure. The piece portrays Epstein's struggle for power with middle-aged, hard-drinking platoon leader Sergeant Merwin J. Toomey. In a memorable scene, Epstein manages to force Toomey to perform two hundred push-ups in front of the platoon.

== Production ==
Biloxi Blues had its world premiere at the Ahmanson Theatre, Los Angeles, California, running from December 8, 1984 to February 2, 1985. It then ran at the Curran Theatre in San Francisco from February 6 through March 9, 1985.

Biloxi Blues opened on Broadway at the Neil Simon Theatre on March 28, 1985 and closed on June 28, 1986 after 524 performances and 12 previews. Directed by Gene Saks, the cast starred Barry Miller as Arnold and Matthew Broderick as Eugene. Scenic Design was by David Mitchell, costume design by Ann Roth, and lighting design by Tharon Musser. Emanuel Azenberg served as producer in association with Center Theatre Group/Ahmanson Theatre.

=== Opening cast ===
Sources:Internet Broadway Database; The New York Times

- William Sadler – Sgt. Merwin J. Toomey
- Barry Miller – Arnold Epstein
- Penelope Ann Miller – Daisy Hannigan
- Randall Edwards – Rowena
- Matthew Broderick – Eugene
- Matt Mulhern – Joseph Wykowski
- Alan Ruck – Don Carney
- Geoffrey Sharp – James Hennesey
- Brian Tarantina – Roy Selridge

=== Notable replacements ===
Matthew Broderick was succeeded by Bruce Norris, Zach Galligan, William Ragsdale, and Jonathan Silverman. Jamey Sheridan replaced William Sadler as Sgt. Toomey.

== Response ==
Frank Rich wrote: "Besides being extremely funny, Biloxi Blues is Mr. Simon's first serious attempt to examine his conscience as an artist and a Jew."

== Awards and nominations ==
Source: Tony Awards at BroadwayWorld, Playbill

- Tony Award for Best Play (winner)
- Tony Award for Best Performance by a Featured Actor in a Play (Barry Miller, winner)
- Tony Award for Best Direction of a Play (Gene Saks, winner)
- Theatre World Award (Barry Miller, winner)
- Drama Desk Award for Outstanding New Play (nominee)
- Drama Desk Award for Outstanding Featured Actor in a Play (Barry Miller, winner; William Sadler, nominee)
- Drama Desk Award for Outstanding Director of a Play (Gene Saks, nominee)
- New York Drama Critics' Circle for Best Play (nominee)

== Film adaptation ==
A 1988 film adaptation was directed by Mike Nichols. The cast features Broderick, Miller, and Mulhern reprising their Broadway roles, with Christopher Walken (Sgt. Toomey), Corey Parker (Epstein), Markus Flanagan (Selridge), and Casey Siemaszko (Carney).
