= Jake's Women =

1992 play by Neil Simon

- Written by: Neil Simon
- Characters: Jake; Maggie; Karen; Julie; Edith; Molly; Sheila
- Setting: New York in the 1980s

Premiere
- Date: March 24, 1992
- Place: Old Globe Theatre (San Diego, California)

Jake's Women is a 1992 play by Neil Simon. The play centers on Jake, a writer suffering from psychosis. Jake talks to many of the women he knows, both in real life and in his imagination, as he works to save his marriage. In 1996, the play was made into a TV movie starring Alan Alda.

== Productions ==
Jake's Women opened on Broadway at the Neil Simon Theater on March 24, 1992, and closed on October 25, 1992, after 245 performances and 14 previews. Directed by Gene Saks, the cast featured Alan Alda (Jake), Helen Shaver (Maggie), Brenda Vaccaro (Karen), Kate Burton (Julie), Joyce Van Patten (Edith), Tracy Pollan (Molly at 21), and Talia Balsam (Sheila). The sets and costumes were by Santo Loquasto and the lighting by Tharon Musser.

Alan Alda was nominated for the Tony Award for Best Actor in a Play.

=== History ===
Jake's Women premiered at the Old Globe Theatre (San Diego, California) in March 1990, running through April, starring Peter Coyote with direction by Jack O'Brien. According to Simon, after that production closed he re-wrote "70 percent", and the role of Jake was re-cast with Alan Alda with a new director, Gene Saks. The role of Jake was re-written, according to Simon: "Jake used to just react to the other people...now he's the centerpiece."

Prior to its Broadway opening, Jake's Women was staged at the Stevens Center in Winston-Salem as part of the North Carolina School of the Arts Broadway Preview Series. The show, starring Alan Alda, had 19 sold-out performances.

In 2016 Jake's Women was staged at Beit Zvi Theatre in Ramat Gan, Israel.

== Plot ==
Act One: Jake, a successful writer living in New York in 1990, gets into an argument over the phone with sister Karen about meeting up for dinner. After hanging up, an imaginary Maggie 'appears', stating he's always working and he's so busy she doesn't even know why he thought of her. Jake and Maggie reminisce about the first time they met.

Jake calls on his sister Karen to help him. Jake explains that he and Maggie are in trouble, and he believes she has been having an affair. Karen goads him into admitting he had an affair a year ago before explaining he loves Maggie more than ever and would do anything to keep her. Maggie arrives home and Jake explains that they are going to dinner with Karen on Saturday. Maggie interrupts, stating she has to go to Philadelphia on Saturday. This leads to an argument between the two, which ends with Maggie proposing a six-month separation. Maggie admits she had an affair, but "it stopped as soon as it started."

Jake's daughter Molly "appears" and tells her father that the problems between him and Maggie are caused by Julie, Jake's late wife and Molly's mother. Molly persuades Jake to talk to his psychiatrist in his mind. Edith, Jake's psychiatrist appears, mocking Jake and his problems.

Maggie tells Jake that he never let Julie go, despite her death. Jake confides in the audience that he has tried to let Julie go, and she is always "bursting in on him." Julie, age 21, appears, demanding to know where he has been. Jake is confused until Julie states that they slept together the previous night. Jake explains to her that it was 29 years ago. Julie, horrified, asks him if he is dead. Jake calls on Karen to help him explain to Julie her death. Julie asks Jake to make her thirty-six, but Jake tells her that she died in a car accident when she was thirty-five while taking Molly up to camp. Jake reminisces about the time when Molly and Maggie met eight years ago.

Present-day Maggie enters and states she is staying at the beach house. Jake gloomily sits on the couch before both Mollys, aged twelve and twenty-one, appear and sit with him. They try to play a game but it ends up relating back to Maggie.

Act Two: Jake hallucinates Maggie asking for his forgiveness, before laughing in his face. Karen and Jake get into an argument over his relationships and it is revealed that he has had several relationships in the six months that Maggie has been gone, the latest with a woman named Sheila. Edith arrives and together, she and Karen irritate him. Jake calls Edith in order to help get rid of the hallucinations. It becomes clear that Jake is losing the ability to distinguish between his visions and reality.

Sheila and Jake have a strange conversation in which Jake's insanity starts to become clear. Maggie "appears" and begins to mock Jake from behind Shelia's back. Jake grows angry with the imaginary Maggie, which frightens Sheila. She eventually runs out of the house screaming.

After an Imaginary reunion between Julie and Molly, the real Maggie informs Jake that she has dinner plans with someone and that she believes that person is going to propose, leading to an argument between Jake and Maggie, and eventually Maggie's departure.

Suddenly, Jake hears the voice of his late mother. She informs him of her forgiveness and love of him and then disappears. All of the other imaginary characters reappear and say goodbye to Jake. The real Maggie announces that she canceled the dinner date and wants to work things out with Jake.

== Film ==
In 1996, the play was made into a TV movie starring Alan Alda with direction by Glenn Jordan. Both Alda and Van Patten were brought in from the original cast to reprise respectively the roles of Jake and Edith.

== Awards and nominations ==
=== Original Broadway production ===
Year	Award	Category	Nominee	Result
1992	Tony Award	Best Actor in a Play	Alan Alda	Nominated
1992	Outer Critics Circle Award	Outstanding Actor in a Play	Alan Alda	Nominated
1992	Theatre World Award		Talia Balsam	Won
1992	Theatre World Award		Helen Shaver	Won
