= Rose's Dilemma =

Rose's Dilemma is the final play written by Neil Simon. It ran in Los Angeles and off-Broadway in 2003.

== Productions ==
The play was produced off-Broadway by the Manhattan Theatre Club at City Center's Stage 1. It ran from November 20, 2003 until February 1, 2004. Directed by Lynn Meadow, it starred John Cullum, Patricia Hodges, David Aaron Baker, and Geneva Carr.

Mary Tyler Moore, who started in previews, left the show on December 3, prior to opening. Variety reported that "(Mary Tyler) Moore was in previews with the production when, according to reports, Simon sent her a letter admonishing her to learn her lines. She exited the play forthwith."

Under the title Rose and Walsh, the play premiered earlier in 2003 in Los Angeles, California at the Geffen Playhouse. Directed by David Esbjornson, it starred Len Cariou as Walsh, Jane Alexander as Rose, Marin Hinkle as Arlene, and David Aaron Baker as Clancy. The Variety reviewer, as quoted in Playbill, wrote: "there's a big audience for a work like this, especially when it's in the hands of these four fine actors."

The play was produced in 2006 in Italy, under the title Fantasma d'Amore: it was also the European premier, directed by Pino Strabioli and starring Anna Mazzamauro as Rose and Michele Gammino as Walsh.

== Plot ==
Author Rose Steiner, suffering from writer's block, needs money and is determined to write another "blockbuster." Rose fantasizes her dead lover, Walsh McLaren, a famous and successful writer. At Walsh's suggestion, Rose decides to complete his unfinished novel, asking a young writer living nearby to help. Rose's assistant, and daughter, Arlene, is trying to be helpful and becomes romantically involved with the young writer, Gavin Clancy.

== Reception ==
The Variety reviewer wrote: "Neil Simon's new play is a strained, sentimental comedy-drama that will hardly burnish the reputation of the veteran playwright, or of Manhattan Theater Club, where it is clunking across the stage in a stiff production from artistic director Lynne Meadow."

Elyse Sommer of CurtainUp wrote: "The fantasy element and the use of celebrity characters may seem like an established writer's brave venture into new territory. Alas, this turns out to be a false promise since nothing in Rose's Dilemma comes off as fresh and new... In Rose's Dilemma there's no danger of missing anything since the laughs come at greater intervals than ever before... Typical for Manhattan Theatre Club, this is a handsomely staged production, well-directed by MTC's artistic director Lynne Meadow. Thomas Lynch's seaside home is airy and furnished in the best of taste, with the ocean view subtly lit by Pat Collins. The costumes by William Ivey Long are suitable."
