= Brighton Beach Memoirs (film) =

1986 film by Gene Saks

- Theatrical release poster
- Directed by: Gene Saks
- Written by: Neil Simon
- Based on: Brighton Beach Memoirs by Neil Simon
- Produced by: Ray Stark
- Starring: Blythe Danner; Bob Dishy; Judith Ivey; Jonathan Silverman
- Cinematography: John Bailey
- Edited by: Carol Littleton
- Music by: Michael Small
- Production company: Rastar
- Distributed by: Universal Pictures
- Release date: December 25, 1986
- Running time: 109 minutes
- Country: United States
- Language: English
- Budget: $18 million
- Box office: $11,957,943

Brighton Beach Memoirs is a 1986 American comedy film directed by Gene Saks, written by Neil Simon, and starring Jonathan Silverman and Blythe Danner. The film is adapted from Simon's semi-autobiographical 1982 play of the same title, the first chapter of what is known as the Eugene trilogy, followed by the adaptations Biloxi Blues and Broadway Bound.

Set in the Brighton Beach section of Brooklyn, New York during The Great Depression, this coming-of-age comedy focuses on Eugene Jerome, a Polish-Jewish American teenager who experiences puberty, sexual awakening, and a search for identity as he tries to deal with his family, including his older brother Stanley, his parents Kate and Jack, Kate's widowed sister Blanche, and her two daughters, Nora and Laurie. The film frequently breaks the fourth wall by having Eugene speak directly to the camera.

== Plot ==
In September 1937, Eugene Jerome is almost 15 and lives in a Jewish-American household in Brighton Beach with his parents Kate and Jack, his 18-year-old brother Stanley, his widowed, asthmatic aunt Blanche Morton, and her two daughters, pretty 16-year-old Nora and sickly 13-year-old Laurie. Blanche is Kate's sister, and after being widowed in her 30s, she and her daughters moved in with the Jeromes, causing Jack to take a second job to support the enlarged household. The extended family lives on the money from Jack's two jobs and Stanley's job at a men's hat shop.

Each member of the family has their own personal problems and concerns, which end up affecting the other family members. Eugene, who hopes to go to college and become a writer, is obsessed with baseball and attempting to see a well-developed girl naked, spying on both Nora and a sexy older woman neighbor. Jack loses his second job and is forced to work nights as a cab driver, until he has a heart attack and must stop working entirely to rest. Jack also worries about his cousin and other relatives who still live in Poland, due to the ominous news bulletins coming from pre-World War II Europe. Stanley dislikes his job, but hesitates to quit because the family needs his salary and he doesn't want to put more stress on Jack, whom he fears might die. Kate is fed up with the pressure of trying to take care of everyone, including her sister Blanche, who lacks confidence and is mutually attracted to the Jeromes' Irish neighbor Frank Murphy, who sometimes drinks. Blanche grieves her late husband and struggles with raising her daughters, especially Nora, who aspires to a Broadway career and wants to accept a well-known producer's offer of an audition. Blanche, finally forced to make a decision, forbids Nora from auditioning, telling her she needs to finish high school first.

Frank invites Blanche on a date, which she accepts despite Kate's disapproval. On the night of the date, Nora retaliates against her mother by leaving the house, causing Blanche to break down in tears right before Frank is due to arrive. Frank's mother, Mrs. Murphy, then sadly lets Blanche know that Frank won't be able to keep the date because he had a car accident while inebriated, is in the hospital, will likely face drunk driving charges, and then the Murphys will be moving away to get Frank help for his drinking problem. Meanwhile, Stanley confesses to his mother Kate that he gambled and lost his entire weekly paycheck trying to make up for the family's loss of Jack's wages. Stanley then leaves home to join the Army. Kate and Blanche argue over Kate's lack of sympathy for the Murphys, and Blanche plans to move out the next day, get her own job and apartment, and send for her daughters as soon as possible.

Nora and Stanley (who at the last minute decides not to join the Army because his father needs him) both return home and are reunited with their respective parents. Kate and Blanche reconcile, and Kate suggests that Blanche remain with the family while she looks for a job, and also that Blanche should move into the Murphys' soon-to-be-vacant apartment across the street. To thank Eugene for his brotherly support, Stanley gives him a picture of a beautiful naked woman. Jack receives the good news that his Polish relatives have escaped from their country and are en route to New York, and the Jeromes excitedly plan for these new additions to their household.

== Cast ==
- Jonathan Silverman - Eugene Morris Jerome, almost 15
- Blythe Danner - Kate Jerome, about 40: Eugene's mother, a strong Jewish matriarch
- Bob Dishy - Jacob "Jack" Jerome, about 40: Eugene's father
- Judith Ivey - Blanche Morton, 38: Eugene's widowed aunt
- Brian Drillinger - Stanley Jerome, 18½: Eugene's older brother
- Stacey Glick - Laurie Morton, 13: Eugene's younger cousin
- Lisa Waltz - Nora Morton, 16½: Eugene's beautiful older cousin
- Alan Weeks - Andrew
- Jason Alexander as Pool Player
- James Handy - Frank Murphy

== Reception ==
Brighton Beach Memoirs holds a score of 71% on Rotten Tomatoes based on 14 reviews.

Roger Ebert, in his review for the Chicago Sun-Times, gave the film two stars out of four and wrote: "The movie feels so plotted, so constructed, so written, that I found myself thinking maybe they shouldn't have filmed the final draft of the screenplay. Maybe there was an earlier draft that was a little disorganized and unpolished, but still had the jumble of life in it.... The movie was directed by Gene Saks, who directs many of Simon's plays on both the stage and the screen, and whose gift is for the theater. His plays have the breath of life; his movies feel like the official authorized version. Everything is by the numbers".

Gene Siskel of the Chicago Tribune also awarded two stars out of four and noted "a general softening of the tension in the Jerome household [from the play] ... Here on film the pathos is missing, and all we are left with is jokes badly performed by a weak central character".

Janet Maslin of The New York Times wrote that the play "has become a film of surprisingly gentle charms. Mr. Simon's humor is much in evidence, but it is not the film's strongest selling point. Even more effective are the sense of a place and a way of life long vanished and the care and affection with which they have been summoned up". Variety declared: "'Brighton Beach Memoirs' emerges as one of the more successful transfers of a Neil Simon play to the screen ... Overall impact is mild, but very pleasantly so".

Michael Wilmington of the Los Angeles Times wrote: "'Brighton Beach Memoirs' may be one of Simon's best plays, but the film's heart seems to be beating in a plastic wrapper. There's a kind of glace over everything, a sugary show-biz coat that dulls your taste buds. Everything is bigger, brighter and broader than it should be—though remnants of that simpler, more honest story often peek through". Paul Attanasio of The Washington Post called the film "a regularly funny and sometimes affecting movie that captures, if not always successfully, the kind of back-and-forth of any ordinary family".
