= Biloxi Blues (film) =

1988 film by Mike Nichols

- Original poster
- Directed by: Mike Nichols
- Written by: Neil Simon
- Based on: Biloxi Blues; 1984 play by Neil Simon
- Produced by: Ray Stark
- Starring: Matthew Broderick; Christopher Walken
- Cinematography: Bill Butler
- Edited by: Sam O'Steen
- Music by: Georges Delerue
- Production company: Rastar
- Distributed by: Universal Pictures
- Release date: March 25, 1988
- Running time: 107 minutes
- Country: United States
- Language: English
- Budget: $17 million
- Box office: $51.7 million

Biloxi Blues is a 1988 American military comedy drama film directed by Mike Nichols, written by Neil Simon, and starring Matthew Broderick and Christopher Walken.

Simon adapted his semi-autobiographical 1984 play of the same title, the second chapter in what is known as the Eugene trilogy, the first being Brighton Beach Memoirs and the third being Broadway Bound.

== Plot ==
During World War II, Jewish teenager Eugene Jerome of Brooklyn is drafted into the United States Army and sent to basic training at Keesler Field in Biloxi, Mississippi. He sets himself three goals: lose his virginity, survive the war, and become a writer. Jerome keeps a journal to record his impressions of his fellow draftees. The new privates are trained by Sergeant Toomey, a wounded veteran with a steel plate in his head. Toomey imposes arbitrary rules and metes out harsh punishments.

A recruit named Epstein refuses to accept Toomey's authority, failing to be broken by Toomey's increasingly harsh punishments and earning the admiration of the other recruits and eventually Toomey's respect. Jerome makes a contest of each man sharing how he'd spend his final days if he had only a week to live. When Epstein says he would make Toomey do 200 push-ups in front of them, Jerome chooses him as the winner. Wykowski makes antisemitic remarks, which leads to a confrontation between him and Epstein. Toomey ends it, but Jerome feels bad for not defending Epstein. When the soldiers prepare for a two-day leave, Wykowski reports his money has been stolen. Toomey demands the thief step forward and Epstein places money on Wykowski's footlocker. Toomey then reveals he took Wykowski's money to teach a lesson about securing valuables. Epstein is confined to the barracks for his false confession, and admits he did it feeling he would be punished by Toomey anyway.

Jerome accomplishes his first goal while on leave when he loses his virginity to a prostitute, but the rest of the platoon returns to barracks before him and discover his journal. Jerome realizes the journal is missing when he returns, and finds the others have been reading from it. Epstein discovers that Jerome believes Epstein is gay.

Toomey enters the barracks in the middle of the night and reports that two soldiers were caught having sex in the latrine, but one escaped. When no one admits to being the escapee, Toomey suspends privileges and weekend leave. The platoon suspects Epstein, giving Jerome a lesson in the power of the written word. The next morning, Hennesey is revealed as the man who escaped, and Jerome realizes he was the only person to stand up for him and Epstein.

After Jerome meets Daisy Hannigan, a beautiful, smart Catholic girl from Gulfport, he leaves camp often to see her, confessing his love right before leaving for his first duty assignment. Jerome admits to the audience that the chances of seeing Daisy again after the war are slim, but that knowing he has a girl waiting back home motivates him to accomplish his second goal of surviving the war.

Near the end of the platoon's training, Toomey gets drunk, fearing an upcoming appointment at a veterans hospital he believes will result in his medical release. Preferring prison to discharge, he holds Jerome at gunpoint to compel him to turn him in for his misdeeds. Jerome calls the platoon to serve as witnesses. Toomey is aware of the story contest Epstein won and accepts Epstein's offer not to press charges in exchange for Toomey completing 200 push-ups.

As his fellow privates sleep on a train en route to their new duty stations, Jerome informs the audience of their fates and reveals he accomplished his third goal of becoming an author, although his path to success was different from what he expected.

== Cast ==
- Matthew Broderick as Private Eugene Morris Jerome
- Christopher Walken as Technical Sergeant Merwin J. Toomey
- Markus Flanagan as Private Roy W. Selridge
- Matt Mulhern as Private Joseph T. Wykowski
- Corey Parker as Private Arnold B. Epstein
- Casey Siemaszko as Private Donald J. Carney
- Michael Dolan as Private James J. Hennesey
- Penelope Ann Miller as Daisy Hannigan
- Park Overall as Rowena

Reprising their stage roles in the movie were Broderick, Miller, Mulhern, and Overall.

== Soundtrack ==
Period songs heard on the soundtrack include:

- "How High the Moon" by Morgan Lewis and Nancy Hamilton
- "Blue Moon" by Richard Rodgers and Lorenz Hart
- "Marie" by Irving Berlin
- "Solitude" by Duke Ellington, Irving Mills, and Edgar DeLange
- "Chattanooga Choo Choo" by Harry Warren and Mack Gordon
- "Don't Sit Under the Apple Tree (with Anyone Else but Me)" by Sam H. Stept, Charles Tobias, and Lew Brown
- "Goodbye Dear, I'll Be Back in a Year" by Mack Kay
- "Memories of You" performed by Benny Goodman

== Reception ==
=== Critical response ===
On Rotten Tomatoes, the film has an approval rating of 76% based on reviews from 29 critics, with an average rating of 6.5/10. On Metacritic, the film has a score of 61% based on reviews from 15 critics, indicating "generally favorable" reviews. Audiences polled by CinemaScore gave the film an average grade of "A-" on an A+ to F scale.

Vincent Canby of The New York Times called the film "a very classy movie, directed and toned up by Mike Nichols so there's not an ounce of fat in it. Mr. Nichols keeps the comedy small, precise and spare. Further, the humor is never flattened by the complex logistics of movie making, nor inflated to justify them". Rita Kempley of The Washington Post thought the film was "an endearing adaptation" and "overall Nichols, Simon and especially Broderick find fresh threads in the old fatigues" despite some "fallow spells and sugary interludes".

Variety called it "an agreeable but hardly inspired film" and added: "Even with high-powered talents Mike Nichols and Matthew Broderick aboard, [the] World War II barracks comedy provokes just mild laughs and smiles rather than the guffaws Simon's work often elicits in the theater".

Roger Ebert of the Chicago Sun-Times called the film "pale, shallow, unconvincing and predictable" and added, "nothing in this movie seems fresh, well-observed, deeply felt or even much thought about ... It's just a series of setups and camera moves and limp dialogue and stock characters who are dragged on to do their business".

The Chicago Tribune commented: "'Biloxi Blues,' the second installment of Neil Simon's autobiographical trilogy, reaches the screen much more successfully than part one—the flat, exceedingly stagey 'Brighton Beach Memoirs.' The difference is due to a star...and a director...who have themselves successfully made the theater-to-film transition and understand something about the different emphases required....Simon, shrewd commercial writer that he is, understands the usefulness and simple oppositions...and he presents the drama chiefly in good/bad terms....The diary scene is the real centerpiece of 'Biloxi Blues,' and Nichols does something extraordinary with it, filming the entire long sequence in a single, unbroken take....Broderick, too, turns in some modest and graceful work. Its performance shows no signs of its theatrical origins....Christopher Walken...has a harder time of it, though it seems his fault less than Simon's....[his character] doesn't develop as much as he sputters along and eventually explodes. With 'Biloxi Blues' Simon has considerably expanded his range as a writer, but a figure on the scale of Sgt. Toomey still seems just beyond his reach."

=== Box office ===
The film opened on 1,239 screens in the US and earned $7,093,325 on its opening weekend, ranking No. 1 at the box office. It eventually grossed $43,184,798 in the US and $8,500,000 in other markets for a total worldwide box office of $51,684,798.
