= Eugene trilogy =

Collection of plays by Neil Simon

The Eugene Trilogy refers to three plays written by Neil Simon, the "quasi-autobiographical trilogy" Brighton Beach Memoirs, Biloxi Blues and Broadway Bound.

== History ==
The trilogy tells the story of Eugene Jerome from his adolescence in New York City, to his time spent in basic training in Biloxi, Mississippi during World War II, and finally to the beginning of his career as an aspiring comedy writer. The trilogy is a semi-autobiographical account of Neil Simon's own early life and career.

In an interview in 1986, Simon said: "'Brighton Beach' was going to be another singular play....Again, I still hadn't thought of a trilogy. But I decided to take Eugene the next step chronologically in my life, which was the army. But even after I wrote 'Biloxi Blues', I still didn't think about a sequel, because if it turned out to be a bomb, why would one want to do a sequel? So I just waited to see what would happen. Well, Biloxi enjoyed enormous success, and I thought of a third part".

=== Stage ===
Brighton Beach Memoirs premiered on Broadway on March 22, 1983; Biloxi Blues premiered on Broadway on March 28, 1985 and Broadway Bound premiered on Broadway on December 4, 1986.

=== Film ===
Brighton Beach Memoirs and Biloxi Blues were made into films, while Broadway Bound was adapted as a made-for-TV movie. On screen the role of Eugene Jerome was played by Jonathan Silverman in Brighton Beach Memoirs (he also played Stanley in the film version of Broadway Bound), Matthew Broderick in Biloxi Blues (he also played Eugene in the Broadway productions of both Brighton Beach and Biloxi Blues), and Corey Parker in Broadway Bound. In a 1992 interview, Simon explained that Broadway Bound was not adapted as a theatrical film like the previous two works in the trilogy for the reason that it "was too expensive for the big screen, because it required extensive outdoor period sets of New York City."

Play	Original stage actor	Film	Film actor
Brighton Beach Memoirs	Matthew Broderick	Brighton Beach Memoirs	Jonathan Silverman
Biloxi Blues	Matthew Broderick	Biloxi Blues	Matthew Broderick
Broadway Bound	Jonathan Silverman	Broadway Bound	Corey Parker
