= Last of the Red Hot Lovers =

Play written by Neil Simon

- Original language: English
- Written by: Neil Simon
- Characters: Barney Cashman; Elaine Navazio; Jeanette Fisher; Bobbi Michele
- Genre: Comedy
- Setting: An apartment in the East Thirties. December, August and September - late afternoon.

Premiere
- Date: December 28, 1969
- Place: Eugene O'Neill Theatre; New York City

Last of the Red Hot Lovers is a comedy by Neil Simon. It premiered on Broadway in 1969.

== Production ==
The play opened on Broadway at the Eugene O'Neill Theatre on December 28, 1969, and closed on September 4, 1971, after 706 performances and six previews. Directed by Robert Moore, the original cast featured James Coco, Linda Lavin (as Elaine), Doris Roberts (as Jeannette), and Marcia Rodd (as Bobbi). The scenic design was by Oliver Smith, the costumes by Donald Brooks, and the lighting by Peggy Clark.

Later in the run, Dom DeLuise replaced Coco, Cathryn Damon and then Rita Moreno replaced Lavin, and Barbara Sharma replaced Rodd.

The play, Coco, Lavin, and Moore all were nominated for Tony Awards.

== Plot overview ==
Barney Cashman, a middle-aged, married nebbish wants to join the sexual revolution before it is too late. A gentle soul with no experience in adultery, he fails in each of three seductions:

- Elaine Navazio, a sexpot who likes cigarettes, whiskey, and other women's husbands;
- Bobbi Michele, an actress friend whom he discovers is madder than a hatter; and
- Jeannette Fisher, his wife's best friend, a staunch moralist.

== Adaptations ==
Simon adapted his play for a 1972 film directed by Gene Saks. The cast featured Alan Arkin, Sally Kellerman (as Elaine), Paula Prentiss (as Bobbi), and Renée Taylor (as Jeanette).

A Chinese adaptation, starring the husband-wife team of Xu Zheng and Tao Hong (who played all 3 seductresses), was so well received in China that the couple performed the play over 30 times in 2005 and 2006.

In 1999 a North American Tour starring Gary Burghoff played throughout the US and Canada. The show was produced by William and Sally Rogers and in addition to Burghoff featured Sherry Lubov-Ripps, Genah Gale and Nancy Marvy.

== Reception ==
Clive Barnes, in his review in The New York Times, wrote: "He is as witty as ever...but he is now controlling that special verbal razzle-dazzle that has at times seemed mechanically chill... There is the dimension of humanity to its humor so that you can love it as well as laugh at it."
