= Gene Saks =

American film director

- Publicity Photo of Gene Saks
- Born: Jean Michael Saks; November 8, 1921; New York City, U.S.
- Died: March 28, 2015 (aged 93); East Hampton, New York, U.S.
- Occupations: Director; actor
- Years active: 1949–2015
- Spouses: Bea Arthur (m. 1950; div. 1978) Keren Saks (m. 1980)
- Children: 3

Gene Saks (born Jean Michael Saks; November 8, 1921 – March 28, 2015) was an American director and actor. An inductee of the American Theater Hall of Fame, his acting career began with a Broadway debut in 1949. As a director, he was nominated for seven Tony Awards, winning three for his direction of I Love My Wife, Brighton Beach Memoirs and Biloxi Blues. He also directed a number of films during his career. He was married to Bea Arthur from 1950 until 1978, and subsequently to Keren Saks from 1980 to his death in 2015.

== Early life ==
Saks was born in New York City, the son of Beatrix (née Lewkowitz) and Morris J. Saks. Saks first became involved in theater as a student at Hackensack High School. He studied at Cornell University. Upon graduation, he served in the U.S. Navy during World War II, taking part in the Normandy landings. He also trained for acting at the Dramatic Workshop of The New School in New York with the German director Erwin Piscator and helped start a theater cooperative at the Cherry Lane Theater and appeared in a number of productions as Off Broadway blossomed.

== Career ==
Saks appeared Off-Broadway in The Bourgeois Gentleman in 1949 and in the City Center's May 1955 two-week revival of South Pacific. On stage he also appeared in E. E. Cummings's Him, A Shot in the Dark, The Tenth Man and A Thousand Clowns, in the role of Leo "Chuckles The Chipmunk" Herman, which he reprised in the film version. He portrayed Jack Lemmon's brother in the screen adaptation of Simon's The Prisoner of Second Avenue, and also appeared in Nobody's Fool starring Paul Newman.

Saks shared a long-term professional association with playwright/comedy writer Neil Simon, directing Simon's plays Biloxi Blues, Brighton Beach Memoirs, Jake's Women, Rumors, Lost in Yonkers, Broadway Bound, The Odd Couple (1985 revival with female cast) and California Suite. His additional Broadway credits included Enter Laughing; Half a Sixpence; Nobody Loves an Albatross; Mame; I Love My Wife; Same Time, Next Year and Rags.

Among Saks's film directing credits were Barefoot in the Park, The Odd Couple, Cactus Flower (which won Goldie Hawn the Academy Award for Best Supporting Actress), Last of the Red Hot Lovers, Mame, Brighton Beach Memoirs, A Fine Romance, and the 1995 television production of Bye Bye Birdie.

== Personal life ==
Saks was married to fellow Actors Studio member actress Bea Arthur from 1950 until 1978. The couple had two sons by adoption: Matthew (born in 1961), an actor, and Daniel (born in 1964), a set designer. He also had a daughter by his second wife Keren Saks. Saks died of pneumonia at his East Hampton residence on March 28, 2015, aged 93.

== Filmography ==
=== Film ===
Director

Year	Title	Notes
1967	Barefoot in the Park	
1968	The Odd Couple	
1969	Cactus Flower	
1972	Last of the Red Hot Lovers	
1974	Mame	
1986	Brighton Beach Memoirs	
1991	A Fine Romance	

Actor

Year	Title	Role	Notes
1965	A Thousand Clowns	Leo Herman	
1975	The Prisoner of Second Avenue	Harry Edison	
1978	The One and Only	Sidney Seltzer	
1983	Lovesick	Frantic Patient	
1984	The Goodbye People	Marcus Soloway	
1991	The Good Policeman	Performer	
1994	Nobody's Fool	Wirf Wirfley	
1994	I.Q.	Boris Podolsky	
1996	On Seventh Avenue	Sol Jacobs	
1997	Deconstructing Harry	Mr. Block	

=== Television ===
Director

Year	Title	Notes
1995	Bye Bye Birdie	TV movie

Actor

Year	Title	Role	Notes
1951	Out There	Performer	Episode: “Misfit”
1954	Omnibus	Traveling salesman	Episode: “Hilde and the Turnpike”
1955	Danger	Performer	Episode: “Precinct Girl”
1955	You Are There	Pvt. Lambert	Episode: “D-Day (June 6, 1944)”
1955	Producers' Showcase	Waiter	Episode: “Reunion in Vienna”
1955	Pond's Theater	Performer	Episode: "The Ways of Courage"
1955	The Elgin Hour	Mitchell Sanders	Episode: “Mind Over Momma”
1955	Playwrights '56	Mr. Baumgarten	Episode: “Snow Job”
1956	Playwrights '56	Doctor	Episode: “The Center of the Maze”
1956	Playwrights '56	Emcee	Episode: “You Sometimes Get Rich”
1958	Kraft Television Theatre	Various Roles	Season 11 - Episode 27
1958	Where Is Thy Brother?	Mr. Kalish	Television Movie
1959	Bachelor Father	Fred	Episode:”Bentley, the Organizer”
1959	Mike Hammer	Gobo McCoy	Episode: See No Evil
1959	Brenner	Vinnie Harper	Episode: “Small Take”
1959	Rendezvous		Episode: ”The Wonderful Ice Cream Suit”
1960	Play of the Week	Mikoel	”The Dybbuk”
1961	Great Ghost Tales	Performer	Episode: “Bye Bye Baby”
1961	The United States Steel Hour	Willie	Episode: “Man on the Mountain Top”
1963	Armstrong Circle Theatre	Arthur Vernon	Episode: “The Embezzler”
1998	Law & Order	Judge Carl Samuel	Episode: “Castoff”

== Theatre ==
As an Actor

Year	Title	Role	Venue
1949	South Pacific	Professor	Majestic Theatre, Broadway
1950	All You Need is a Good Break	Performer	Mansfield Theatre, Broadway
1955	South Pacific	Professor	New York City Center, New York
1956-57	The Good Woman of Setzuan	First God	Phoenix Theatre, Broadway
1958	The Infernal Machine	Capt. of the Patrol	Phoenix Theatre, Broadway
1958	Howie	Professor	46th Street Theatre, Broadway
1959-61	The Tenth Man	Rabbi	Booth Theatre; Ambassador Theatre
1960	Love and Libel	Norman Yarrow	Martin Beck Theatre, Broadway
1961-62	A Shot in the Dark	Morestan	Booth Theatre, Broadway
1962-63	A Thousand Clowns	Leo Herman	Eugene O'Neill Theatre, Broadway

As a Director

Year	Title	Playwright	Venue
1963-64	Enter Laughing	Joseph Stein	Henry Miller's Theatre
1963-64	Nobody Loves an Albatross	Ronald Alexander	Lyceum Theatre
1965-66	Half a Sixpence	David Heneker	Broadhurst Theatre
1965-55	Generation	William Goodhart	Morosco Theatre
1966-70	Mame	Jerry Herman	Winter Garden Theatre; Broadway Theatre
1970	Sheep on the Runway	Art Buchwald	Helen Hayes Theatre
1971	How the Other Half Loves	Alan Ayckbourn	Royale Theatre
1975-78	Same Time, Next Year	Bernard Slade	Brooks Atkinson Theatre; Ambassador Theatre
1976-77	California Suite	Neil Simon	Eugene O'Neill Theatre
1977-79	I Love My Wife	Michael Stewart	Ethel Barrymore Theatre
1981	The Supporting Cast	George Furth	Biltmore Theatre
1982	Special Occasions	Bernard Slade	Music Box Theatre
1983-86	Brighton Beach Memoirs	Neil Simon	Alvin Theatre; Neil Simon Theatre; 46th Street Theatre
1985-86	Biloxi Blues	Neil Simon	Neil Simon Theatre
1985-86	The Odd Couple	Neil Simon	Broadhurst Theatre
1986	Rags	Joseph Stein	Mark Hellinger Theatre
1986-88	Broadway Bound	Neil Simon	Broadhurst Theatre
1987	A Month of Sundays	Bob Larbey	Ritz Theatre
1988-90	Rumors	Neil Simon	Broadhurst Theatre; Ethel Barrymore Theatre
1990	Lost in Yonkers	Neil Simon	Richard Rogers Theatre
1992	Jake's Women	Neil Simon	Neil Simon Theatre
1997	Barrymore	William Luce	Music Box Theatre

== Awards and nominations ==
Tony Awards

Year	Award	Nominated work	Result
1965	Best Direction of a Musical	Half a Sixpence	Nominated
1966	Best Direction of a Musical	Mame	Nominated
1975	Best Direction of a Play	Same Time, Next Year	Nominated
1977	Best Direction of a Musical	I Love My Wife	Won
1983	Best Direction of a Play	Brighton Beach Memoirs	Won
1985	Best Direction of a Play	Biloxi Blues	Won
1991	Best Direction of a Play	Lost in Yonkers	Nominated

Drama Desk Awards

Year	Award	Nominated work	Result
1975	Outstanding Director of a Play	Same Time, Next Year	Nominated
1977	Outstanding Director of a Play	I Love My Wife	Nominated
1985	Outstanding Director of a Play	Biloxi Blues	Nominated
1987	Outstanding Director of a Play	Broadway Bound	Nominated

- 1969 DGA Award for Outstanding Directorial Achievement in a Movie – The Odd Couple - Nom
- 1991 Outer Critics Circle for Outstanding Direction of a Play - Lost in Yonkers - Won

Honours

- Inducted into the American Theater Hall of Fame in 1991.
