= Broadway Bound =

1987 play written by Neil Simon

- Written by: Neil Simon
- Series: Eugene trilogy: Brighton Beach Memoirs; Biloxi Blues; Broadway Bound
- Genre: Comedy

Premiere
- Date: October 6, 1986

Broadway Bound is a semi-autobiographical play by Neil Simon. It is the last chapter in his Eugene trilogy, following Brighton Beach Memoirs and Biloxi Blues.

== Plot overview ==
The play is about Eugene and his older brother, Stanley, dealing with their parents' relationship falling apart as the brothers work together toward being comedy writers for the radio, and, eventually, television. They discover that their father, Jack, has been cheating on their mother, Kate. It is obvious to the family before Jack even admits it, and they try to find ways for Kate to cope with the loss when Jack may eventually leave. Jack reveals that the woman he has been seeing is dying.

When Eugene and Stanley find a job where they can write short comedic skits for the radio, they obscurely make fun of their own family. Jack can hear the similarities between the fictional family in the broadcast and their own family, and becomes outraged. He gets into a major argument with Stanley, which turns into an argument about Jack's affair. Later, Kate holds a nostalgic conversation with Eugene, revealing how she had tried to win his father's heart when she was younger.

Eventually, Jack leaves. Stanley and Eugene move out when they get the great offers for which they'd hoped. Kate remains in the house with her father, Ben (an elderly Jewish man with socialist leanings who provides the play with most of its warmth and humor), until Ben goes to follow his wife to Miami.

== Characters ==
Eugene Morris Jerome – The play's narrator and the focal character of the Eugene trilogy. Carefree, witty to a fault, and quick to joke, he is 23 years old and working in the stock room of a music company before his brother and writing partner, Stanley, helps them both to break into the world of showbiz. While he maintains his affable and seemingly care-free nature, Eugene cares deeply about everyone in his family, especially for his parents – on whom he bases the ridiculous characters of his first big comedy sketch. Neil Simon wrote Eugene as his own self, the playwright's semi-autobiographical analogue in the work.

Stanley Jerome – Eugene's older brother. At 28 years old, he is neurotic, high-strung, and constantly obsessing and worrying over the details. He brokers the first opportunity for him and his brother to show their material to CBS Studios and co-writes the sketch with his brother; the two constantly bicker and play as they attempt to write their first big comedy sketch. Later, it is Stanley who stands up to Jack in their iconic argument in Act II.

Ben Epstein – Father of Kate, grandfather to Stanley and Eugene. A born socialist and ardent follower of Trotsky, he lives with his daughter and her family in Brighton Beach. Stan and Eugene find Grandpa, in his age, to be one of their greatest goldmines for accidental comedy, with Eugene going so far as to say to the audience that "he was the greatest teacher of comedy I ever had...and he didn't even know I was studying him." He cares deeply for his daughters and their families, but due to his upbringing and beliefs is not an affectionate man.

Kate Jerome – A strong woman through and through, Eugene and Stanley's mother has done her best to take care of her father, Ben, while raising her boys and keeping a wary eye on her husband. She values family, and familial experiences – such as the simple act of sitting down and eating together as a family. She knows her boys are grown men, but will never not see them as her babies – when Eugene becomes ill during Act II, she admonishes him as a child for not being in bed when the radio show begins, among other examples. Before the start of the play, she is already aware of her husband's indiscretions, and is the one to confront him over them – however, she stands her ground and does not falter when Jack admits his guilt.

Jack Jerome – The father to Eugene and Stanley, he's a tough nut for certain. Having worked as a clothier for many years, making ladies raincoats, he's become a bit numb to the monotony of life. This in turn, before the play's start, lead him to having a brief affair, on again and off again. Like Ben, he is not an affectionate man, masked by his exhaustion and his own self-provided frustrations. He becomes outraged when the radio program his sons wrote turns out to sound eerily similar to their own family situation, and quickly admonishes them before being put back into place by Stanley for his own affairs. He leaves Kate at the end of the play.

Blanche Morton – Kate's (now) well-to-do sister, who featured more heavily in 'Brighton Beach Memoirs'. She has remarried, and her second husband built himself up to afford a home on Park Avenue and the finer things in life. Ben is at odds with Blanche when she comes to visit in Act I – she wants him to move to Florida with his semi-estranged wife, who he avoids speaking with. He, on the other hand, can only focus on Blanche's giving in to capitalist society. She ultimately serves as the beginning framework, in her conversations with Ben, where we learn of the real situation between Jack and Kate.

== Production history ==
The play premiered at Duke University's Reynolds Theater on October 6, 1986. Simon has indicated that the smaller premiere venue took pressure off trying to please the critics.

The play opened on Broadway at the Broadhurst Theatre on December 4, 1986 and closed on September 25, 1988 after 756 performances. Produced by Emanuel Azenberg and directed by Gene Saks, the cast starred Linda Lavin as Kate, Jonathan Silverman as Eugene, Jason Alexander as Stanley, Phyllis Newman as Blanche, John Randolph as Ben and Philip Sterling as Jack. Joan Rivers took over the role of Kate for the play's final months on Broadway.

The play received four Tony Award nominations, including Best Play, Linda Lavin (Lead Actress, Play), Phyllis Newman (Featured Actress, Play), and John Randolph (Featured Actor, Play). Linda Lavin won as Best Actress in a Play and John Randolph won as Best Featured Actor in a Play. It received four nominations for the Drama Desk Award, with Lavin and Randolph winning.

It also was a 1987 finalist for the Pulitzer Prize for Drama.

A Broadway revival, directed by David Cromer, was scheduled to open in November 2009 (previews) at the Nederlander Theatre, running in repertory with Brighton Beach Memoirs. The announced cast included Laurie Metcalf as Kate Jerome, Dennis Boutsikaris as Jack Jerome, Santino Fontana as Stanley Jerome, Jessica Hecht as Blanche, Josh Grisetti as Eugene Jerome and Allan Miller as Ben. However, Brighton Beach Memoirs closed on November 1, 2009 due to weak ticket sales and the planned production of Broadway Bound was canceled.

== Film adaptation ==
Broadway Bound was adapted into a television movie in 1992. The film was directed by Paul Bogart with the screenplay written by Neil Simon. The cast starred Anne Bancroft (Kate), Hume Cronyn (Ben), Jerry Orbach (Jack), Jonathan Silverman (Stan) and Corey Parker (Eugene). Cronyn won a 1992 Primetime Emmy Award for Outstanding Supporting Actor in a Miniseries or a Movie for his role in the film.

== Reception ==
Frank Rich, in his review for The New York Times wrote: " Broadway Bound contains some of its author's most accomplished writing to date – passages that dramatize the timeless, unresolvable bloodlettings of familial existence as well as the humorous conflicts one expects. But the seamless merging of laughter, character and emotion that ignited Biloxi Blues is only intermittently achieved here. There are stretches, especially in Act I, when Broadway Bound isn't funny or moving but just reportorial and expository, with plot twists and thematic invocations piling up undigested, like the heavier courses at an attenuated Passover seder."

== Awards and nominations ==
=== Original Broadway production ===
Year	Award	Category	Nominee	Result
1987	Tony Award	Best Play		Nominated
1987	Tony Award	Best Actress in a Play	Linda Lavin	Won
1987	Tony Award	Best Featured Actor in a Play	John Randolph	Won
1987	Tony Award	Best Featured Actress in a Play	Phyllis Newman	Nominated
1987	Drama Desk Award	Outstanding Play		Nominated
1987	Drama Desk Award	Outstanding Actress in a Play	Linda Lavin	Won
1987	Drama Desk Award	Outstanding Featured Actor in a Play	John Randolph	Won
1987	Drama Desk Award	Outstanding Direction of a Play	Gene Saks	Nominated
1987	Pulitzer Prize	Drama	Neil Simon	Finalist
