= Broadway Bound (film) =

1992 American television film

- Genre: Comedy; Drama
- Based on: Broadway Bound by Neil Simon
- Written by: Neil Simon
- Directed by: Paul Bogart
- Starring: Corey Parker; Jonathan Silverman; Anne Bancroft; Jerry Orbach; Michele Lee; Hume Cronyn
- Theme music composer: David Shire
- Country of origin: United States
- Original language: English

Production
- Executive producers: Emanuel Azenberg; Michael Brandman
- Producer: Terence Nelson
- Cinematography: Isidore Mankofsky
- Editor: Andy Zall
- Running time: 89 minutes
- Production company: ABC Productions

Original release
- Network: ABC
- Release: March 23, 1992

Broadway Bound is a 1992 American made-for-television comedy film directed by Paul Bogart, written by Neil Simon, and starring Corey Parker and Jonathan Silverman. Simon adapted his semi-autobiographical 1986 play Broadway Bound, the third chapter in what is known as the Eugene trilogy, the first being Brighton Beach Memoirs and the second being Biloxi Blues. Silverman, who played Eugene Jerome in the original stage version of Broadway Bound and in the film adaptation of Brighton Beach Memoirs, plays Eugene's older brother Stanley in the film. Parker played Pvt. Arnold Epstein in the film adaptation of Biloxi Blues. In a 1992 interview, Simon explained that Broadway Bound was not adapted as a theatrical film like the previous two works in the trilogy for the reason that it "was too expensive for the big screen, because it required extensive outdoor period sets of New York City."

== Synopsis ==
The film is about Eugene and his older brother, Stanley, dealing with their parents' relationship falling apart as the brothers work together toward being comedy writers for the radio, and, eventually, television.

== Cast ==
- Corey Parker as Eugene Morris Jerome
- Jonathan Silverman as Stanley Jerome
- Anne Bancroft as Kate Jerome
- Hume Cronyn as Ben
- Jerry Orbach as Jack Jerome
- Michele Lee as Blanche

== Reception ==
Cronyn won a 1992 Primetime Emmy Award for Outstanding Supporting Actor in a Mini-series Special for his role in the film.
