= The Prisoner of Second Avenue =

1975 film by Melvin Frank

- Theatrical release poster
- Directed by: Melvin Frank
- Screenplay by: Neil Simon
- Based on: The Prisoner of Second Avenue; 1971 play by Neil Simon
- Produced by: Melvin Frank
- Starring: Jack Lemmon; Anne Bancroft; Gene Saks
- Cinematography: Philip Lathrop
- Edited by: Robert Wyman
- Music by: Marvin Hamlisch
- Distributed by: Warner Bros. Pictures
- Release date: March 14, 1975 (United States)
- Running time: 98 minutes
- Country: United States
- Language: English

The Prisoner of Second Avenue is a 1975 American black comedy film written by Neil Simon, directed and produced by Melvin Frank and starring Jack Lemmon and Anne Bancroft. Neil Simon adapted the screenplay from his 1971 Broadway play.

== Plot ==
The story revolves around the escalating problems of a middle-aged couple living on Second Avenue on the Upper East Side of Manhattan, New York City. Mel Edison has just lost his job after 22 years of faithful service, and now has to cope with being unemployed at middle age during an economic recession. The action occurs during an intense summer heat wave and a prolonged garbage strike, which exacerbates Edison's plight as he and his wife Edna deal with noisy and argumentative neighbors, loud sounds emanating from Manhattan streets up to their apartment, and even a broad-daylight burglary of their apartment. Mel can't find a job, so Edna goes back to work. Mel eventually suffers a nervous breakdown, and it is up to the loving care of his brother Harry, his sisters, and, mostly, Edna, to try to restore him to a new reality.

== Cast ==
- Jack Lemmon as Mel Edison
- Anne Bancroft as Edna Edison
- Gene Saks as Harry Edison
- Elizabeth Wilson as Pauline
- Florence Stanley as Pearl
- Maxine Stuart as Belle
- F. Murray Abraham as Taxi Driver
- John Ritter as Elevator Passenger (uncredited)
- Ed Peck as Man Upstairs (uncredited)
- Sylvester Stallone as Youth in Park (suspected pickpocket)

== Production ==
=== Development and writing ===
The Prisoner of Second Avenue premiered on Broadway at the Eugene O'Neill Theatre on November 11, 1971, and closed on September 29, 1973, after 798 performances and four previews. Produced by Saint Subber and directed by Mike Nichols, the play starred Peter Falk and Lee Grant as Mel and Edna Edison and Vincent Gardenia as Mel's brother Harry.

The production received 1972 Tony Award nominations for Best Play, for Mike Nichols for Best Director, Play, and Vincent Gardenia for Supporting Actor, Play.

Clive Barnes, in The New York Times, wrote that "it is, I think, the most honestly amusing comedy that Mr. Simon has so far given us." Walter Kerr, in The New York Times, wrote: "He [Simon] has made a magnificent effort to part company with the mechanical, and his over-all success stands as handsome proof that humor and honesty can be got into bed together."

The play ran in the West End at the Vaudeville Theatre, produced by Old Vic Company/Old Vic Productions and Sonia Friedman Productions, opening on June 30, 2010, in previews. Directed by Terry Johnson, the cast starred Jeff Goldblum and Mercedes Ruehl. This marked Ruehl's London stage debut.

The film version of The Prisoner of Second Avenue stars Jack Lemmon, Anne Bancroft and Gene Saks. It was produced and directed by Melvin Frank from a screenplay by Simon. The music is by Marvin Hamlisch. Sylvester Stallone appears in a brief role as a suspected mugger of Jack Lemmon's character.

== Reception ==
=== Critical response ===
A. H. Weiler of The New York Times wrote that if the film "is less than an overpowering study of a married couple driven to distraction by the irritations and indignities of local middle-class living, it still scores valid points, both serious and funny ... Mr. Simon is serious about a theme that isn't earth-shaking and he understandably cloaks its gravity with genuine chuckles that pop up mostly as radio news bulletins such as the flash that a Polish freighter has just run into the Statue of Liberty. And, with a cast whose members appreciate what they're saying and doing, the gnawing problems of 'Second Avenue' become a pleasure." Arthur D. Murphy of Variety wrote, "The film is more of a drama with comedy, for the personal problems as well as the environmental challenges aren't really funny, and even some of the humor is forced and strident ... maybe there have been too many films on the trials of urban existence to make yet another parade of big city woes laughable." Gene Siskel of the Chicago Tribune gave the film one-and-a-half stars out of four and stated that "knocking the problems of living in New York City is no longer funny. It's become an old joke."

Charles Champlin of the Los Angeles Times wrote that "in Simon's tussles to make jokes, make truth and make jokes about some bitter truths, the outcome is curious, uneven, tense and involving. 'Prisoner' is most impressive when it is least funny; the laughter comes out of a painful craziness." Gary Arnold of The Washington Post panned the film as a "monotonous, static, self-righteous gripe comedy ... [Simon] ends up patronizing his characters instead of understanding what drives and ails them." Paul D. Zimmerman of Newsweek described the film as "Simon at his least, if only because Mel and Edna are not characters, only playthings of urban havoc." Pauline Kael of The New Yorker disparaged the film "a big-screen sitcom," adding, "Neil Simon tells us exactly what each person is thinking, and each line cancels out the one before. This is bad enough on the stage, but on the screen it's intolerable."

On the review aggregator website Rotten Tomatoes, 52% of 52 critics' reviews are positive. The website's consensus reads: "The Prisoner of Second Avenue falters in its translation from stage to screen, with Jack Lemmon's strong portrayal of escalating paranoia overshadowed by forced situational humor."
