= Jonathan Silverman =

American actor (born 1966)

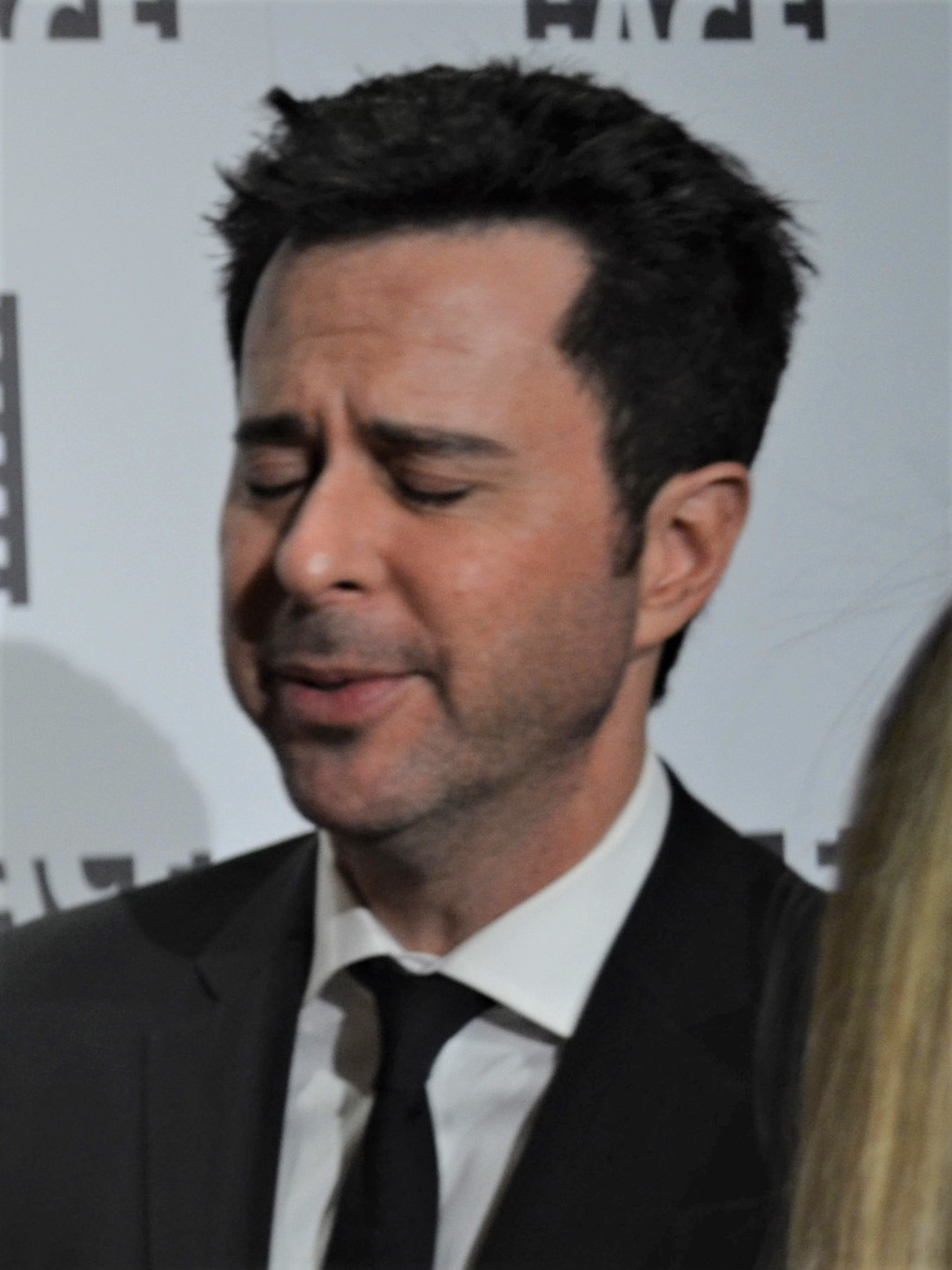
- Silverman in 2012
- Born: Jonathan Elihu Silverman; August 5, 1966 (age 60); Los Angeles, California, U.S.
- Occupation: Actor
- Years active: 1984–present
- Spouse: Jennifer Finnigan (m. 2007)
- Children: 1

Jonathan Elihu Silverman (born August 5, 1966) is an American actor. He is known for his roles in the comedy films Brighton Beach Memoirs, Weekend at Bernie's, and its sequel Weekend at Bernie's II as well as his starring role in the TV series The Single Guy.

== Early life and education ==
Silverman was born in Los Angeles, California, to a Jewish family. He is the son of Hillel Emanuel Silverman, a rabbi and Devora (née Halaban) Silverman. He is the grandson of famous Conservative Rabbi Morris Silverman. His mother is from Jerusalem, where her family has lived since the establishment of Israel. He graduated Beverly Hills High School in 1984 and is friends with David Schwimmer, who was a classmate. In high school, he acted in theater productions of West Side Story, Fiddler on the Roof, Androcles and the Lion, Hamlet, and A Midsummer Night's Dream. At the age of 17, he was selected for the road company of Brighton Beach Memoirs, which performed in 15 cities.

== Career ==
Silverman is known for his roles the films Girls Just Want to Have Fun (1985), Brighton Beach Memoirs (1986) (a film version of the first play of Neil Simon's Eugene Trilogy), Caddyshack II (1988), Weekend at Bernie's (1989), Little Sister (1992), and Little Big League (1994). He played the role of Eddie in Beethoven's Big Break, and starred in the film Jam (2006).

Silverman began his career on television, with a main role on the sitcom Gimme a Break! from 1984 to 1986. From 1995 to 1997, Silverman played the title role in the television NBC sitcom The Single Guy. In the 2000s, Silverman was a main cast member on the sitcoms In Case of Emergency and Significant Mother. He has also made guest appearances on Friends (in the episode "The One with the Birth"), CSI: Miami, Psych, Hot in Cleveland, and White Collar. In 2014, he guest starred on Law & Order: Special Victims Unit as a controversial standup comedian.

== Personal life ==
Silverman has been married to actress Jennifer Finnigan since 2007; the two met at a barbecue in 2004. They have a daughter.

== Philanthropy ==
In 2004, Silverman participated in the first-ever US television advertising campaign supporting donations to Jewish federations. The program featured "film and television personalities celebrating their Jewish heritage and promoting charitable giving to the Jewish community" and included Greg Grunberg, Marlee Matlin, Joshua Malina, and Kevin Weisman.

== Filmography ==
=== Film ===
Year	Film	Role	Notes
1985	Girls Just Want to Have Fun	Drew Boreman	
1986	Brighton Beach Memoirs	Eugene Morris Jerome	Silverman had earlier played the same role on Broadway.
1988	Caddyshack II	Harry	
1988	Stealing Home	Teenage Alan Appleby	
1989	Weekend at Bernie's	Richard Parker	
1991	Class Action	Brian	
1991	Age Isn't Everything	Seymour	
1992	Death Becomes Her	Jay Norman	
1992	Little Sister	Bobby / Roberta	
1992	Breaking the Rules	Rob Konigsberg	
1992	Blue Champagne	Bob	
1993	Weekend at Bernie's II	Richard Parker	
1993	The Pitch	Gary	Short film
1993	12:01	Barry Thomas	
1994	Teresa's Tattoo	Rick	
1994	Little Big League	Jim Bowers	
1995	French Exit	Davis	
1996	Two Guys Talkin' About Girls	Lenny Kaminski	
1998	The Odd Couple II	Brucey Madison	
1998	Denial	Joel	
1998	Border to Border	Suicide Guy	
1998	12 Bucks	Hyper	
1998	Just a Little Harmless Sex	Danny	
1999	Freak City	Lenny Stanapolous	
2000	Dirk and Betty	Tow Truck Guy	
2000	Men Named Milo, Women Named Greta	The Voice of Reason	Short film
2001	Made	Bachelor	
2001	Lip Service	Bobby	
2001	It is What it Is	Benjamin Malvern	
2001	The Medicine Show	Taylor Darcy	
2004	The Cookout	Wes	
2005	Laura Smiles	Paul	
2005	The Life Coach	Jonny	
2006	Jam	Gary	
2006	Shoot	Jack Puig	Short film
2006	Coffee Date	Barry	
2006	Farce of the Penguins	Seal Critics	Voice role
2007	Jekyll	Lanyon	
2008	Beethoven's Big Break	Eddie	Direct-to-video
2011	Conception	Brad	
2011	Cookie	Johnny	Short film
2011	Swinging with the Finkels	Peter	
2011	Inkubus	Office Tech	
2011	National Lampoon's Snatched	Johnny	
2012	Another Dirty Movie	Uncle Erwin	Also director and executive producer
2013	Crawlspace	Tim Gates	
2013	G.B.F.	Mr. Daniels	
2013	Self Storage	Jonah	Also producer
2014	The Hungover Games	Chineca Lame	
2014	The Opposite Sex	Tom	Also director and producer
2014	Beethoven's Treasure Tail	Eddie	Direct-to-video
2014	A Magic Christmas	Robert Jones	
2015	Baby, Baby, Baby	Jacob Carlin	
2016	Diani & Devine Meet the Apocalypse	Shane	
2017	An American Dog Story	Slibs	
2018	Andover	Adam Slope	Also producer
2018	Frank & Ava	Mannie Sacks	
2019	Pegasus: Pony with a Broken Wing	Josh Killian	

=== Television ===
Year	Film	Role	Notes
1984	E/R	David Sheinfeld	Episode: "Son of Sheinfeld"
1984–86	Gimme a Break!	Jonathan Maxwell	Recurring role, 2 episodes Main role, 25 episodes
1985	Challenge of a Lifetime	Steven Schoonover	Television film
1989	Traveling Man	Billy Fox	Television film
1992	For Richer, For Poorer	Michael Katourian	Television film
1992	Broadway Bound	Stanley Jerome	Television film; Silverman plays the older brother of the character he had originally played on Broadway.
1993	12:01	Barry Thomas	Television film
1994	Couples	Jamie	Television film
1994	Aaahh!!! Real Monsters	Pugh	Episode: "Don't Just Do It"/"Joined at the Hip" (voice role)
1995	Sketch Artist II: Hands That See	Glenn	Television film
1995	Friends	Dr. Franzblau	Episode: "The One with the Birth"
1995	Caroline in the City	Jonathan Eliot	Episode: "Caroline and the Folks"
1995–97	The Single Guy	Jonathan Eliot	Main role, 41 episodes
1996	London Suite	Paul Dolby	Television film; uncredited
1996	Arliss	Jonathan Silverman	Episode: "The Client's Best Interest"
1998	The Inspectors	Inspector Alex Urbina	Television film
2000	The Inspectors 2: A Shred of Evidence	Alex Urbina	Television film; also co-executive producer
2000	Good as Gold		Television film
2001	These Old Broads	Wesley Westbourne	Television film
2002	Bobbie's Girl	David Lewis	Television film
2003	Miss Match	Barry	Episode: "The Price of Love"
2003	Deacons for Defense	Michael Deane	Television film
2003	Free for All	Johnny Jenkins	Main role, 7 episodes
2004	CSI: Miami	Jay Seaver	Episode: "Under the Influence"
2004	Pryor Offenses	Ian	Television film
2004	DeMarco Affairs	Eddie Rosen	Television film
2004–05	Kim Possible	Jimmy Ding	Episodes: "Ron Millionaire", "Dimension Twist" (voice role)
2005	Related	Brad	Episode: "Sex and the Sisters"
2007	In Case of Emergency	Harry Kennison	Main role, 13 episodes
2007	Close to Home	Pete Durkin	3 episodes
2008	Numb3rs	Kurt Young	Episode: "Blowback"
2009	Psych	Lyin' Ryan	Episode: "Truer Lies"
2009	Married Not Dead	Gordon	Television film
2010	Medium	Matt Mulhearn	Episode: "Sal"
2010	Jack's Family Adventure	Jack Vickery	Television film
2011	Paul the Male Matchmaker	Brian	Episode: "Don't Be a Meanie"
2011	Greek	Lasker Parkes	3 episodes
2011	White Collar	Gerald Jameson	Episode: "Veiled Threat"
2012	Hot in Cleveland	Dr. Minton	Episode: "The Gateway Friend"
2013	Monday Mornings	Dr. John Lieberman	Recurring role, 5 episodes
2014	Law & Order: Special Victims Unit	Josh Galloway	Episode: "Comic Perversion"
2014	Significant Mother	Harrison Marlowe	Main role, 8 episodes
2015	Getting On	Dr. Happy Gladner	Recurring role, 5 episodes
2016	Baby Daddy	Malcolm	Episode: "Homecoming and Going"
2016	Castle	Alan Masters	Episode: "Dead Again"
2017	Rosewood	Bastion Bleiweiss	Episode: "Blistering Heat & Brotherly Love"
2017	Still the King	Bob	Episode: "The Hungover Games"
2018	K.C. Undercover	Mitch Bishop	Recurring role, 4 episodes
2018	Scandal	Robert Bacall	Episode: "Army of One"
2018	Take Two	Bradley Marsh	Episode: "Smoking Gun"
2018	Salvation	Roland Cavanaugh	Recurring role, 4 episodes
2019	No Good Nick	Paul	Recurring role, 5 episodes
2020	Station 19	Ted	Episode: "Dream a Little Dream of Me"
2021	Good Girls	Dave	Recurring role, 13 episodes
2021-2023	Moonshine	Daniel Bennett	Recurring role, 9 episodes
2023	Goosebumps	Perry Biddle	Episode: "Night of the Living Dummy"
2026	Sullivan's Crossing	Dr. Quincy Carlson	Season Four

== Awards ==
In 2014, Jonathan won Best Supporting Actor for his role as Johnny in National Lampoon's Snatched at the Hoboken International Film Festival.
