= The Odd Couple (film) =

1968 film based on the play of the same name directed by Gene Saks

- Theatrical release poster
- Directed by: Gene Saks
- Written by: Neil Simon
- Based on: The Odd Couple by Neil Simon
- Produced by: Howard W. Koch
- Starring: Jack Lemmon; Walter Matthau; John Fiedler; Herb Edelman
- Cinematography: Robert B. Hauser
- Edited by: Frank Bracht
- Music by: Neal Hefti
- Distributed by: Paramount Pictures
- Release date: May 2, 1968 (Radio City Music Hall)
- Running time: 105 minutes
- Country: United States
- Language: English
- Budget: $1.2 million
- Box office: $44.5 million

The Odd Couple is a 1968 American comedy film directed by Gene Saks, produced by Howard W. Koch and written by Neil Simon, based on his 1965 play. It stars Jack Lemmon and Walter Matthau as two divorced men—neurotic neat-freak Felix Ungar and fun-loving slob Oscar Madison—who decide to live together.

The film was successful with critics and grossed more than $44.5 million, making it the third highest-grossing film of 1968 in the United States. The success of the film was the basis for ABC to produce a popular sitcom series starring Tony Randall and Jack Klugman as Felix and Oscar, respectively.

Almost three decades later, a sequel—The Odd Couple II, in which Lemmon and Matthau reprised their roles—was released, but it was a critical and commercial failure.

== Plot ==
Newly separated Felix Ungar wanders Manhattan in a daze, with thoughts of dying by suicide.

Divorced sportswriter Oscar Madison and his poker playing cronies Murray, Speed, Roy and Vinnie have assembled in Madison's Upper West Side apartment for their usual Friday night game. Murray is concerned because their mutual friend Felix is unusually late for the game. Murray's wife phones and informs them that Felix's whereabouts are unknown. Oscar calls Felix's wife Frances, who tells him that she and Felix have separated.

Felix arrives, unaware that everyone has already heard that he and his wife have separated. The nervous group attempts to pretend that nothing is wrong, but Felix eventually breaks down and his friends attempt to console him. After everyone else leaves, Oscar suggests that Felix move in with him, for Oscar has lived alone since breaking up with his own ex-wife, Blanche, sometime earlier. Felix agrees and urges Oscar not to be shy about letting him know if he gets on Oscar's nerves.

Within a week, Felix is driving Oscar crazy. Felix is constantly cleaning the apartment and berating Oscar for being so sloppy. Uninterested in having any fun, Felix spends most of his time thinking about Frances. While at a tavern, Oscar tells Felix about recently meeting two English sisters who live in their building, Cecily and Gwendolyn Pigeon. Oscar telephones the girls and arranges a double date for the following evening.

After the Pigeon sisters arrive, Oscar leaves the room to mix some drinks, hoping that uptight Felix will loosen up while alone with the two flirtatious girls. Instead, Felix talks incessantly about his wife and children and begins weeping. The sisters are attracted to Felix's sensitivity and invite the two men to their apartment, but Felix refuses to go.

The following day, Oscar is still angry with Felix for ruining the date. He resorts to giving his friend the silent treatment and tormenting him by deliberately making the apartment as much of a mess as possible. Eventually, the tension escalates to an argument that results in Oscar demanding that Felix move out. Felix complies but leaves Oscar feeling guilty for having abandoned his friend who is still in need.

Oscar assembles the poker group to help find Felix, but they are unsuccessful. After returning to Oscar's apartment to play poker, Gwendolyn appears and informs Oscar that Felix has moved in with her and Cecily. Felix shows up and tells Oscar that he intends to get a place of his own. Felix and Oscar apologize to each other, realizing that a bit of each has rubbed off on the other, each better for the experience. Felix promises that next week, he will attend their usual Friday night poker game. The normally slovenly Oscar reminds his friends to keep their cigarette butts off the floor as the poker game continues.

== Cast ==
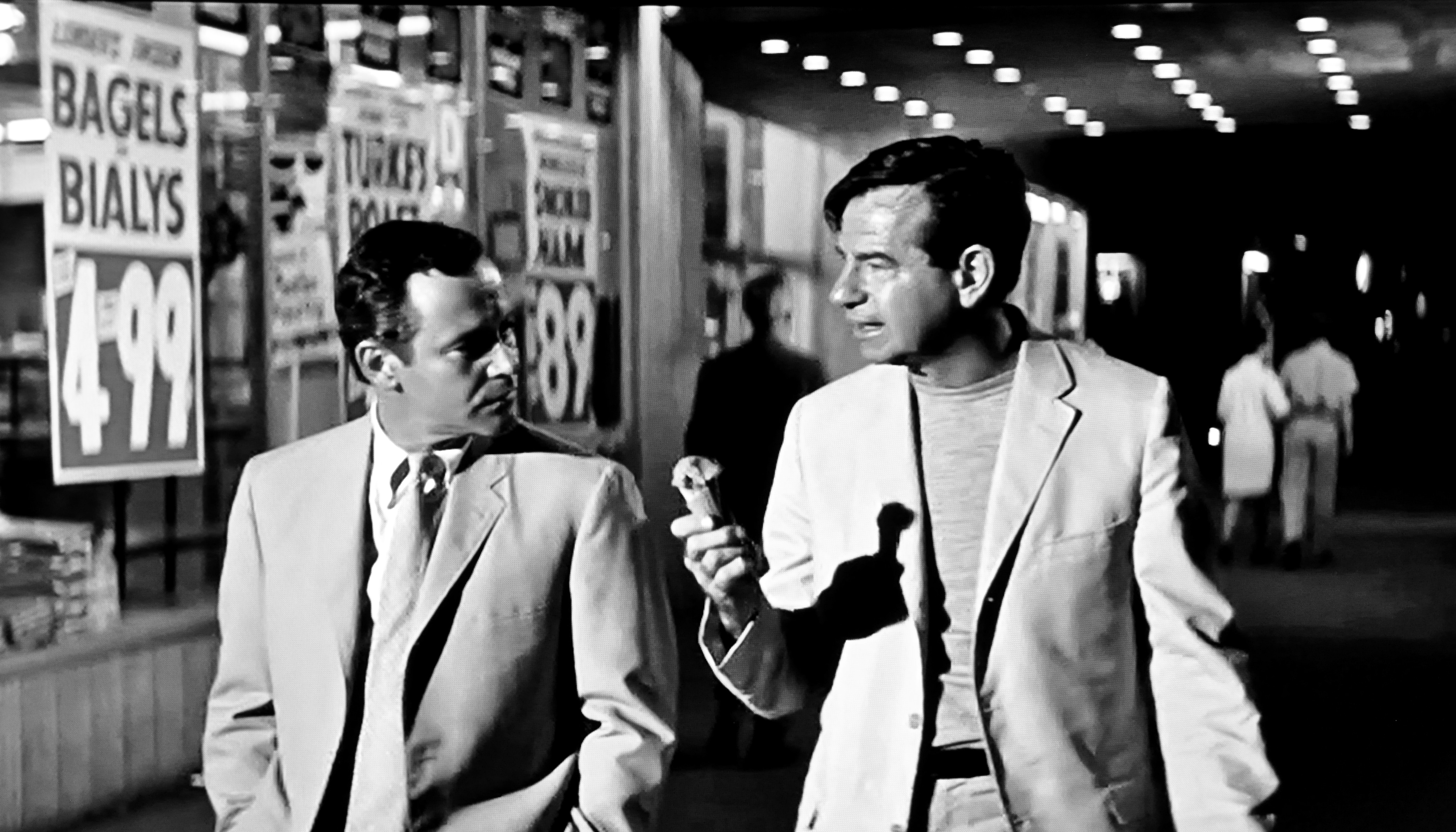
Jack Lemmon and Walter Matthau in The Odd Couple

- Jack Lemmon as Felix Ungar
- Walter Matthau as Oscar Madison
- Herb Edelman as Officer Murray Greshler
- John Fiedler as Vinnie Barella
- David Sheiner as Roy
- Larry Haines as Homer "Speed" Deegan
- Monica Evans as Cecily Pigeon
- Carole Shelley as Gwendolyn Pigeon
- Billie Bird as Chambermaid
- Iris Adrian as Waitress
- Angelique Pettyjohn as Go-Go Dancer
- John C. Becher as Hotel Clerk
- Ted Beniades as The Bartender
- Bill Baldwin as Sports Announcer
- Patricia D. Bohannon as Bowler
- Clark Ross as Restaurant Patron

== Production ==
The Odd Couple was originally produced for Broadway, and the original cast starred Art Carney as Felix and Walter Matthau as Oscar. At one point, Frank Sinatra (as Felix) and Jackie Gleason (as Oscar) were reportedly considered for the film version. Dick Van Dyke and Tony Randall were also among those considered for the role of Felix, and Mickey Rooney and Jack Klugman (who later replaced Matthau as Oscar on Broadway) were among those considered to portray Oscar in the film. Oscar's poker playing friends in the film are Roy (David Sheiner), Vinnie (John Fiedler), Homer "Speed" Deegan (Larry Haines) and Murray the policeman (Herbert Edelman). Klugman and Randall would later go on to star in the TV series as their respectively considered roles, and become Emmy Award winners in the process.

Much of the original script from the play was retained for the film, although the setting was expanded. For example, rather than take place entirely in Oscar's apartment, Neil Simon added some scenes that take place at various New York City locations (such as the scene at Shea Stadium in Queens).

The scene at Shea Stadium, which also featured Heywood Hale Broun, was filmed before the start of a real game between the New York Mets and the Pittsburgh Pirates on June 27, 1967. Roberto Clemente was asked to hit into the triple play that Oscar does not observe, but he refused to do it and Bill Mazeroski took his place.

One of the outdoor scenes in the film involves Felix shopping at Bohack, a Maspeth, Queens-based supermarket chain that was ubiquitous in the New York City area during the mid-20th century. The last Bohack supermarket closed in 1977.

=== Theme music ===
The award-winning jazz instrumental theme was composed by Neal Hefti. It is used throughout the movie's sequel starring Lemmon and Matthau that was released 30 years later. It was also adapted for the 1970 TV series. The song also has seldom-heard lyrics, written by Sammy Cahn.

== Release ==
The film's copyright date in the opening credits mistakenly reads MCMXLVII (1947).

== Reception ==
=== Box office ===
The Odd Couple opened at New York's Radio City Music Hall on May 2, 1968, and ran there for a record-breaking 14 weeks, with a record gross of $3.1 million. It grossed more than $44.5 million in the United States, making it the third highest-grossing film of 1968.

=== Critical reception ===
On the review aggregator website Rotten Tomatoes, 97% of 39 critics' reviews are positive, with an average rating of 8/10. The website's consensus reads: "Enlivening Neil Simon's crackerjack script with their harmonious rapport, Jack Lemmon and Walter Matthau are a perfect pairing as The Odd Couple." Metacritic, which uses a weighted average, assigned the film a score of 86 out of 100, based on 10 critics, indicating "universal acclaim".

Roger Ebert of the Chicago Sun-Times gave the film 3½ stars out of four, and praising the "universally good" performances, although he noted times when "the movie's Broadway origins are painfully evident, as when the players in the poker game are grouped around three sides of the table, but the 'downstage' side is always left bare."

Renata Adler of The New York Times called the film "a very funny, professional adaptation" of the play, although "Mr. Lemmon sometimes overacts".

Arthur D. Murphy of Variety called it an "excellent film", adding that the "teaming of Lemmon and Matthau has provided each with an outstanding comedy partner".

Charles Champlin of the Los Angeles Times declared, "My not very fearless forecast is that 'The Odd Couple' will cause more people to do more laughing than any film you are likely to see all year."

Stanley Eichelbaum of the San Francisco Examiner wrote that "Neil Simon, whose hit plays haven't always been served too well by Hollywood (remember the flat-footed film of Barefoot in the Park), did his own adaptation this time and there's been no appreciable loss of hilarity", also applauding Saks's direction and the performances of the cast.

=== Accolades ===
Award	Category	Nominee(s)	Result	Ref.
Academy Awards	Best Screenplay – Based on Material from Another Medium	Neil Simon	Nominated	
Academy Awards	Best Film Editing	Frank Bracht	Nominated	
American Cinema Editors Awards	Best Edited Feature Film	Frank Bracht	Nominated	
Directors Guild of America Awards	Outstanding Directorial Achievement in Motion Pictures	Gene Saks	Nominated	
Golden Globe Awards	Best Motion Picture – Musical or Comedy		Nominated	
Golden Globe Awards	Best Actor in a Motion Picture – Musical or Comedy	Jack Lemmon	Nominated	
Golden Globe Awards	Best Actor in a Motion Picture – Musical or Comedy	Walter Matthau	Nominated	
Grammy Awards	Best Original Score Written for a Motion Picture or a Television Special	Neal Hefti	Nominated	
Laurel Awards	Top Comedy		Won	
Laurel Awards	Top Male Comedy Performance	Jack Lemmon	Nominated	
Laurel Awards	Top Male Comedy Performance	Walter Matthau	Won	
Writers Guild of America Awards	Best Written American Comedy	Neil Simon	Won	

The film is recognized by American Film Institute in these lists:

- 2000: AFI's 100 Years...100 Laughs – #17
- 2005: AFI's 100 Years...100 Movie Quotes:
  - Oscar Madison: "I cannot stand little notes on my pillow! "We are all out of cornflakes, F.U." It took me three hours to figure out 'F.U.' was Felix Ungar." – Nominated

== Legacy ==
=== Spin-offs ===
The film spawned a television series spin-off in 1970, also titled The Odd Couple, that ran for five seasons until 1975.

Also in the 1970s, a cartoon version called The Oddball Couple ran on ABC on Saturday mornings. Produced by DePatie–Freleng, it features a sloppy dog and a neat cat.

The New Odd Couple, featuring African American actors in the lead roles of Oscar and Felix, was broadcast on ABC from 1982-83.

=== Sequel ===
In 1998, almost three decades later, a sequel, The Odd Couple II, was released. It reunited Lemmon and Matthau, along with original writer Neil Simon. However, it was a critical and commercial failure, grossing less than half than its predecessor.

=== Cancelled remake ===
In 2025, actor Dick Van Dyke revealed that he had previously been developing a remake of the film starring himself and Ed Asner. These plans were scrapped after Asner's death in August 2021.

== See also ==
- List of American films of 1968
