= California Suite =

1976 play by Neil Simon

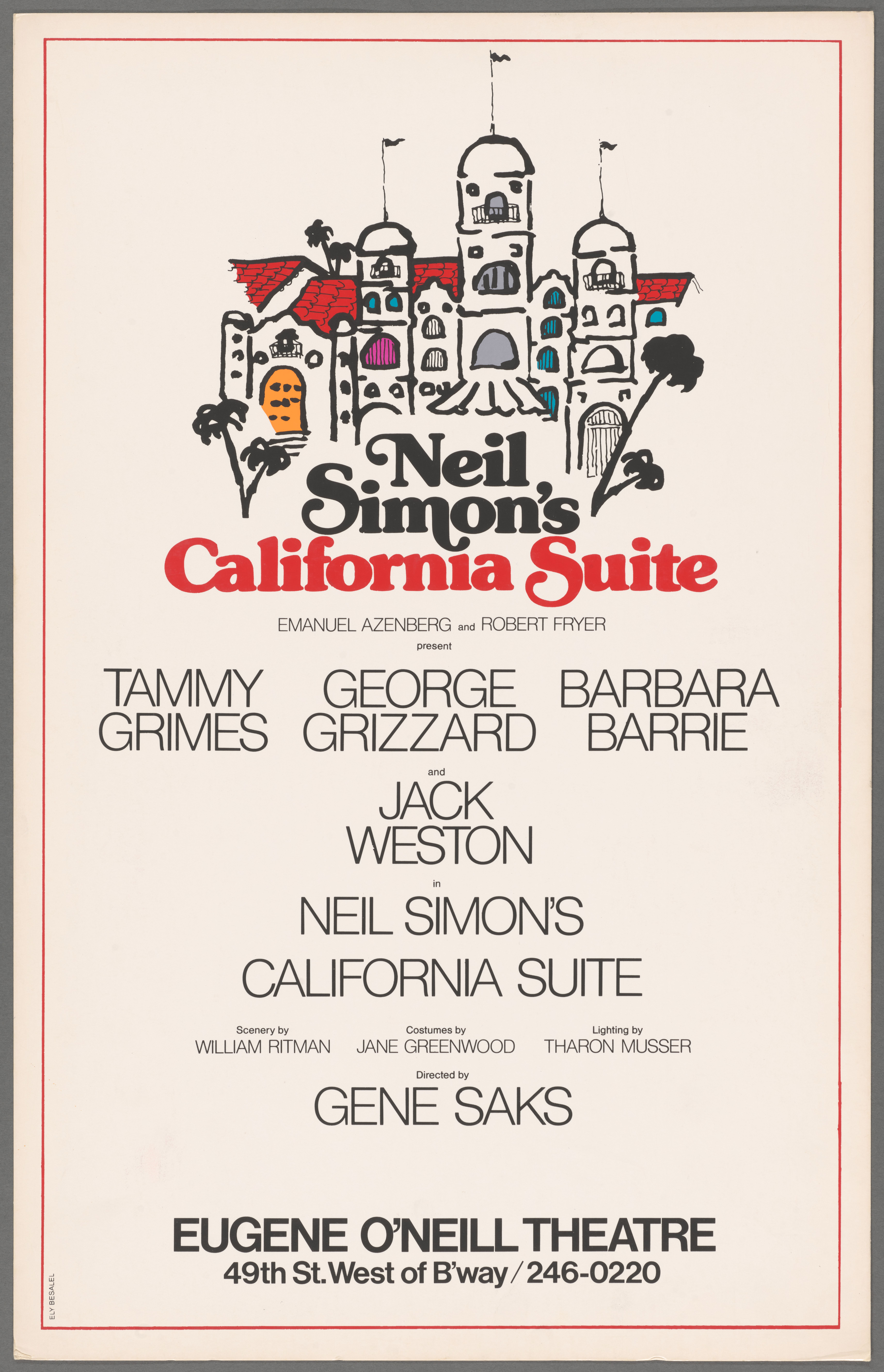
- Poster for the stage production California Suite at the Eugene O'Neill Theatre
- Written by: Neil Simon
- Original language: English
- Genre: Comedy
- Setting: Suite 203-04 in The Beverly Hills Hotel

Premiere
- Date premiered: April 23, 1976
- Place premiered: Ahmanson Theatre; Los Angeles

California Suite is a 1976 play by Neil Simon. Similar in structure to his earlier Plaza Suite, the comedy is composed of four playlets set in Suite 203-04, which consists of a living room and an adjoining bedroom with an ensuite bath, in The Beverly Hills Hotel.

== Plot ==
In "Visitor from New York", Hannah Warren is a Manhattan workaholic who flies to Los Angeles to retrieve her teenage daughter Jenny after she leaves home to live with her successful screenwriter father William. The bickering, divorced couple is forced to decide what living arrangements are best for the girl.

Conservative, middle-aged businessman Marvin Michaels is the "Visitor from Philadelphia", who awakens to discover a prostitute named Bunny unconscious in his bed after consuming a bottle of vodka. With his wife Millie on her way up to the suite, he must find a way to conceal all traces of his uncharacteristic indiscretion.

The "Visitors from London" are British actress Diana Nichols, a first-time nominee for the Academy Award for Best Actress, and her husband Sidney, a once-closeted antique dealer who increasingly has become indiscreet about his sexual orientation. The Oscar is an honor that could revive her faltering career, but Diana knows she doesn't have a chance of winning. She is in deep denial about the true nature of her marriage of convenience, and as she prepares for her moment in the spotlight, her mood fluctuates from hope to panic to despair.

The "Visitors from Chicago" are two affluent couples who are best friends. Stu Franklyn and his wife Gert and Mort Hollender and his wife Beth are taking a much-needed vacation together. Things begin to unravel quickly when Beth is hurt during a tennis match, and Mort accuses Stu of causing her injury.

== Productions ==
California Suite originally was produced by the Center Theatre Group. Directed by Gene Saks, it opened on April 23, 1976, at the Ahmanson Theatre, where it ran until June 5. Tammy Grimes portrayed Hannah, Diana, and Gert; George Grizzard portrayed William, Sidney, and Stu; Barbara Barrie portrayed Millie and Beth; and Jack Weston portrayed Marvin and Mort.

The play opened on Broadway at the Eugene O'Neill Theatre on June 10, 1976 and closed on July 2, 1977 after 445 performances and four previews. Directed by Saks, the same cast (and Leslie Easterbrook as Bunny) as in the Ahmanson Theatre opened on Broadway.

Later in the run, Marge Redmond replaced Barrie (on January 7, 1977), Kenneth Haigh (on February 28, 1977) and then David McCallum (on May 2, 1977) replaced Grizzard, Rue McClanahan replaced Grimes (on April 4, 1977) and Vincent Gardenia replaced Weston (on June 13, 1977).

The play's national tour, lasting from Oct. 1, 1977-June 3, 1978, starred Elizabeth Allen as Hannah, Diana, and Gert; Robert Reed as William, Sidney, and Stu; Warren Berlinger as Marvin and Mort; Patti Karr as Millie and Beth; and Bea Swanson as Bunny. During the run, Don Murray replaced Reed.

A bus and truck tour, which cut "Visitors from Chicago" and ran from Aug. 31-Dec. 2, 1978, was headlined by Carolyn Jones as Hannah, Diana and Millie. The cast also included James Drury as William and Marvin, Peter Bailey-Britton as Sidney and Aurelia De Felice as Bunny.

== Critical reception ==
In his review in The New York Times, Clive Barnes wrote "For those of us who imagine Los Angeles as nothing but a long street in desperate search of a parking lot, Neil Simon's California Suite which opened most joyously and triumphantly at the Eugene O'Neill Theater last night, will come as a vast relief." Less enthusiastic was the critic for New York Magazine who wrote: "Sleazily written, shoddily constructed, and without a scintilla of Neil Simon's usual slick adroitness with a gag line, this grab bag of skits...suggests that California life may have scrambled Mr. Simon's brains."

== Film adaptation ==
Simon adapted his play for a 1978 feature film directed by Herbert Ross. The cast includes Alan Alda, Jane Fonda, Walter Matthau, Bill Cosby, Richard Pryor, Elaine May, Maggie Smith, and Michael Caine. Smith won an Oscar for her performance playing an actress who is nominated for, but does not win, an Oscar.
