= Brighton Beach Memoirs =

1984 play written by Neil Simon

- Original playbill
- Written by: Neil Simon
- Series: Eugene Trilogy: Brighton Beach Memoirs; Biloxi Blues; Broadway Bound
- Genre: Comedy

Premiere
- Date: December 10, 1982

Brighton Beach Memoirs is a semi-autobiographical play by Neil Simon. The play is a coming of age comedy focused on the main character of Eugene Morris Jerome, a Jewish teenager from a Polish immigrant family. It is set in September 1937 in the Brighton Beach section of Brooklyn, New York, during the Great Depression. According to Simon, the play tells its story "through the eyes of a 15-year-old boy who is writing his memoirs—which is what I did when I was 15".

Brighton Beach Memoirs premiered in December 1982. In 1983, it received the New York Drama Critics' Circle Award for Best Play and was nominated for the Drama Desk Award for Outstanding New Play. Brighton Beach Memoirs is the first play in what is known as Simon's Eugene trilogy, and was followed by Biloxi Blues (1984) and Broadway Bound (1986). The play was adapted into a film of the same name in 1986.

== Productions ==
Brighton Beach Memoirs had a pre-Broadway engagement at the Ahmanson Theatre in Los Angeles on December 10, 1982, and following an additional pre-Broadway engagement at the Curran Theatre in San Francisco, the play premiered on Broadway at the Alvin Theatre on March 27, 1983 and transferred to the 46th Street Theatre, where it closed on May 11, 1986 after 1,299 performances and seven previews. Directed by Gene Saks, the cast featured Matthew Broderick (Eugene Jerome), Elizabeth Franz (Kate Jerome), Peter Michael Goetz (Jack Jerome), Mandy Ingber (Laurie Morton), Željko Ivanek (Stanley Jerome), Jodi Thelen (Nora Morton) and Joyce Van Patten (Blanche Morton). Van Patten joined the cast after Piper Laurie was let go during rehearsals. Scenic design was by David Mitchell, Costumes were by Patricia Zipprodt and lighting was by Tharon Musser.

Cast replacements included Fisher Stevens, Doug McKeon, Jon Cryer, Robert Sean Leonard, and Jonathan Silverman as Eugene and Elizabeth Perkins, Josh Hamilton, Stanley Tucci, Anita Gillette, Patrick Breen, Dick Latessa and Verna Bloom in other roles. Brighton Beach Memoirs is the last non-musical play to run over 1,000 consecutive performances on Broadway.

Broadway revival

A revival opened on Broadway on October 25, 2009 at the Nederlander Theatre. Directed by David Cromer, the cast featured Laurie Metcalf as Kate Jerome and Dennis Boutsikaris as Jack Jerome, with Santino Fontana as Stanley Jerome, Jessica Hecht as Blanche, Gracie Bea Lawrence as Laurie, Noah Robbins as Eugene and Alexandra Socha as Nora.

The production was planned to run in repertory with Broadway Bound, which was to feature the same cast with the exception of Josh Grisetti, who was to assume the role of the "older" Eugene (played by Noah Robbins in the earlier play) and Allan Miller in the role of Ben. The two plays were produced and promoted as "The Neil Simon Plays". Despite generally positive reviews from New York critics, Brighton Beach Memoirs closed on November 1, 2009 after nine performances and 25 previews due to weak ticket sales. Subsequently, the planned production of Broadway Bound was cancelled.

== Plot overview ==
The Jerome family includes Eugene's older brother Stanley; his parents Kate and Jack; Kate's sister Blanche; and Blanche's two daughters, Nora and Laurie, who came to live at Kate and Jack's home following the death of Blanche's husband.

The play begins outside the Jeromes' home. Fourteen-year-old Eugene is playing baseball by himself, imagining that he is playing in the World Series. After Kate yells at Eugene to stop playing, he enters the house. Eugene informs the audience that when he grows up, he wants to be a professional baseball player or a writer. Later, he mentions that he is sexually attracted to his older cousin Nora, and that his younger cousin Laurie has a frail heart, that leads to others in the family babying her.

Sixteen-year-old Nora enters the house in a state of excitement. She has been given the opportunity to audition for a part as a dancer in a Broadway show, and she has been told by the producer that she will get the part if her mother permits her to audition. Blanche states that she is concerned about Nora's idea because she does not want her daughter to drop out of school to do so; nevertheless, Blanche decides to wait until Jack comes home from work to see what he has to say.

When Stanley gets home from work, he informs Eugene that he has been fired. After a black co-worker was treated unfairly by the boss, Stanley stood up for him. After his boss responded negatively, Stanley swept dirt on his boss's shoes. If he wants his job back, he has to give the boss an apology letter the next morning. Stanley is conflicted between standing up for what is right and helping the cash-strapped family financially. He decides to discuss the matter with Jack.

Jack arrives home from work and tells Kate that the business where he worked at his second job has gone under. He is concerned about the family's finances. A tense family dinner follows, and Laurie mentions Nora’s potential audition. Later, Nora and Jack take a walk to the beach to discuss the situation.

Upstairs, Eugene tells Stanley that he has had an erotic dream that resulted in a nocturnal emission. Stanley assures him that wet dreams are normal for teenaged boys. The brothers have a frank discussion about puberty and masturbation. Downstairs, Blanche tells Kate that she plans to go on a dinner date with a neighbor, Frank Murphy. Kate objects to this idea because of Murphy's ethnicity and his alcohol abuse. When Nora and Jack return home, Nora asks her mother for a final decision, claiming Jack simply advised Nora to finish school, as there will be other auditions in the future. Blanche refuses to give Nora permission to attend the audition because she wants her to finish high school; Nora is very angry.

Stanley tells Jack that he has been fired and explains the situation. His father is initially angered, but understands Stanley's reasons. Stanley chooses to write the apology letter. He goes upstairs and asks for Eugene's help, as Eugene is a talented writer. Eugene agrees to write the letter, but only if Stanley tells him what Nora looked like when he saw her naked.

Act II takes place a week after Act I. Jack has suffered a mild heart attack and is resting at home. Blanche is preparing for her date with Frank Murphy. Stanley tells Eugene that he has lost his entire week's salary playing poker; he is despondent. Kate tells Stanley to turn over his pay to her so that she can give the money to Blanche in case an emergency arises during her date. Stanley tells her the truth about how he lost the money.

Frank Murphy's mother sends Blanche a note indicating that her son will not be available for their date because has been hospitalized following a car accident that occurred while he was driving drunk. The note added that the Murphys were moving upstate so that Frank could get help with his alcohol problem. Kate and Blanche have a terrible argument in which decades-long resentments come to the surface. Blanche resents Kate's lack of empathy for Frank's issues and Kate claims Blanche shows lack of empathy for Jack, who nearly killed himself for the sake of Laurie's weekly doctor visits, and Nora's dance lessons. Blanche ultimately decides she wants to move in with a friend, get a job, and find lodging for herself and her daughters so that she will no longer be dependent on her sister and Jack.

Stanley tells Eugene that he intends to leave home that night and join the Army. Later that evening, Blanche and Nora argue. Nora informs her mother that she does not believe her mother loves her as much as she loves Laurie. The two reconcile. Kate comes downstairs and asks Blanche to continue living in their home until she can find work. The sisters also reconcile.

Stanley returns home for dinner the next day. He passed the military physical, but decided not to sign up because he was needed at home. Stanley tells Jack about how he gambled away his salary, and Jack is understanding and forgives him. Stanley also mentions he worked the night shift at a bowling alley to earn back some of the money he lost, and promises to continue to work odd jobs until he earns it all back.

Jack receives a letter stating that his cousin and his family has escaped from war-torn Poland and are headed to New York City. He and Kate begin to discuss how they will provide lodging for the relatives when they arrive. Upstairs, Stanley gives Eugene a postcard of a nude woman. Eugene is transfixed, as he has—for the first time—viewed female genitalia (referred to by Eugene as "the Golden Palace of the Himalayas").

=== Characters ===
- Eugene Morris Jerome, almost 15 years old.
- Stanley Jerome, 18½ years old: Eugene's older brother.
- Blanche Morton, 38 years old: Eugene's widowed aunt.
- Nora Morton, 16½ years old: Eugene's older cousin.
- Laurie Morton, 13 years old: Eugene's younger cousin.
- Kate Jerome, about 40 years old: Eugene's mother.
- Jacob "Jack" Jerome, about 40 years old: Eugene's father.

== Awards and nominations ==
- Tony Award for Best Performance by a Featured Actor in a Play (Broderick, winner; Ivanek, nominee)
- Tony Award for Best Performance by a Featured Actress in a Play (Franz, nominee)
- Tony Award for Best Direction of a Play (Saks, winner)
- Theatre World Award (Broderick, winner)
- Drama Desk Award for Outstanding New Play (nominee)
- Drama Desk Award for Outstanding Actor in a Play (Broderick, nominee)
- New York Drama Critics' Circle Award for Best Play (winner)

== Connection to Jewish culture ==
Much of Neil Simon's work (Brighton Beach Memoirs being a clear example) is semi-autobiographical. Simon infused Jewish humor into Brighton Beach Memoirs and represented Jewish culture in a way that many Jews found comforting and reminiscent of their families. According to Dr. Yvette alt Miller, Simon's characters showed real American Jews what they looked like; they offered "an unsettling mirror: one in which we watched our community identify as Jews only in the most cursory ways, through humor and cultural touchstones".

== Reception ==
Reviews for the original Broadway production were mixed. Clive Barnes of the New York Post called Brighton Beach Memoirs Simon's "best play yet" but also "a slight disappointment" because the playwright "always pulls back from the jugular." Frank Rich of the New York Times judged the play to be "a pleasant evening" that "never quite stops being nice and starts being either consistently involving or entertaining." Nevertheless, the play was popular with Broadway audiences and had a long and successful run. When the play was not nominated for the Tony Award for Best Play, producer Emanuel Azenberg called the snub "an outrageous injustice" and "a personal insult," and Variety published an editorial declaring "Neil Simon Deserves Better." In 1983 Dolores Dolan of The New York Times said that after it achieved popularity on Broadway, the community of Brighton Beach "attracted some notice" when it had historically "receive[d] little attention".

The New York Times, in analyzing the failure of the 2009 Broadway revival of Brighton Beach Memoirs, wrote that "What went wrong with 'Brighton Beach Memoirs' is a case study in success and failure on Broadway today. There were no big stars like Jude Law in the current commercial hit 'Hamlet,' there was no marketing campaign that framed the Simon play as a can’t-miss theatrical event, and there was no wow factor that brought the period piece to life, like the breakneck pacing of the popular farce 'Boeing-Boeing' last year. But the failure also reflects America’s evolving sense of humor and taste... It actually received good reviews, but the play was shuttered because people, for whatever reason, did not want to see the Simon show about a Depression-era family laughing through the tears. The show cost $3 million to produce but never grossed more than $125,000 a week in ticket sales during preview performances — or 15 percent of the maximum possible — an amount that did not even cover running costs."

== Film adaptation ==
In 1986, the play was adapted into a movie directed by Gene Saks. The screenplay was written by Neil Simon. The cast featured Jonathan Silverman (Eugene), Blythe Danner (Kate), Bob Dishy (Jack), Lisa Waltz (Nora), Brian Drillinger (Stanley), Stacey Glick (Laurie), and Judith Ivey (Blanche).

Roger Ebert, in his review for the Chicago Sun-Times wrote: "The movie feels so plotted, so constructed, so written, that I found myself thinking maybe they shouldn't have filmed the final draft of the screenplay. Maybe there was an earlier draft that was a little disorganized and unpolished, but still had the jumble of life in it.... The movie was directed by Gene Saks, who directs many of Simon's plays on both the stage and the screen, and whose gift is for the theater. His plays have the breath of life; his movies feel like the official authorized version. Everything is by the numbers."
