= Corey Parker (actor) =

American actor and acting coach (1965–2026)

- Born: July 8, 1965; New York City, U.S.
- Died: March 5, 2026 (aged 60); Memphis, Tennessee, U.S.
- Education: Actors Studio; Ensemble Studio Theatre
- Occupations: Actor; acting coach
- Years active: 1969–2002; 2010–2026

Corey Parker (July 8, 1965 – March 5, 2026) was an American actor and acting coach.

== Career ==
Parker’s mother was actress and acting coach Rochelle “Rocky Parker (1939-2014).Following high school, Parker committed to acting full-time. He was a member of the Actors Studio and the Ensemble Studio Theater. He performed onstage at the 61st Academy Awards in 1989.

Films in which Parker has appeared include Biloxi Blues, Willy/Milly, White Palace, Friday the 13th: A New Beginning, and How I Got into College. He has also appeared on television in series including Thirtysomething, Broadway Bound, Blue Skies, Love Boat: The Next Wave, and co-starred with Téa Leoni in the 1992-93 Fox sitcom Flying Blind.

He later had a recurring role on the sitcom Will & Grace as the character "Josh". His television movies include The Lost Language of Cranes for the BBC; Mr. and Mrs. Loving; Courage with Sophia Loren; A Mother's Prayer; and Destiny, The Elizabeth Taylor Story.

Parker was guest artist at Rhodes College and at the University of Memphis. He was the official acting coach for CMT's Sun Records and also worked as a coach on Ms. Marvel. Parker was a guest instructor at HB Studio.

== Death ==
Parker died from cancer in Memphis, Tennessee, on March 5, 2026, at the age of 60.

== Filmography ==
=== Film ===
Year	Title	Role	Notes
1984	Scream for Help	Josh Dealey	
1985	Friday the 13th Part V: A New Beginning	Pete	
1986	9½ Weeks	Janitor	
1986	Willy/Milly	Lopez	aka Something Special
1988	Biloxi Blues	Arnold B. Epstein	
1989	Big Man on Campus	Alex	
1989	How I Got into College	Marlon Browne	
1990	White Palace	Larry Klugman	
1991	The Lost Language of Cranes	Elliot Abrahams	
1995	Grandpa's Funeral	Jonathan Metsler	
1997	Fool's Paradise	Raymond 'Ray' Powers	
2002	The End of the Bar	Rich Garner	
2010	One Came Home	John Mazilli	
2011	Woman's Picture	Hotel John	
2013	Crystal Lake Memories: The Complete History of Friday the 13th	Himself	Documentary film
2014	Being Awesome	Jeffery Hirsch	
2021	The Trouble	Wayne	
TBA	Demon Lake	Fisherman	

=== Television ===
Year	Title	Role	Notes
1983	As the World Turns	Bully	Episode #1.7010
1983–1986	ABC Afterschool Special	Various roles	3 episodes
1985	The New Leave It to Beaver	Chuck	Episode: "No Free Lunch"
1985	The Best Times	Chuck Luther	Episode: "Sweetheart"
1986	Courage	Tony Miraldo	Television film
1987	At Mother's Request	Larry Schreuder	2 episodes
1987	The Bronx Zoo	Henry Dodd	Episode: "The Power of a Lie"
1987	CBS Summer Playhouse	Michael	Episode: "Sons of Gunz"
1989–1990	Thirtysomething	Lee Owens	6 episodes
1990	I'm Dangerous Tonight	Eddie	Television film
1991	Eddie Dodd	Various roles	6 episodes
1991	Big Deals	Dashiel 'Dash' Ryan	Television film
1992	Broadway Bound	Eugene Jerome	Television film
1992–1993	Flying Blind	Neil Barash	22 episodes
1994	Blue Skies	Joel Goodman	8 episodes
1995	Liz: The Elizabeth Taylor Story	Eddie Fisher	Television film
1995	A Mother's Prayer	Spence Walker	Television film
1996	Mr. and Mrs. Loving	Bernard S. Cohen	Television film
1996	Encino Woman	David Hosenfelt	Television film
1996	Touched by an Angel	Henry Moskowitz	Episode: "Written in Dust"
1998–1999	Love Boat: The Next Wave	John Morgan	25 episodes
2000	Will & Grace	Josh	5 episodes
2014	Nashville	Luke's Manager	Episode: "All or Nothing with Me"
2017	Sun Records	Pete Isacson	Episode: "No Favors Here"
