= Neil Simon =

American playwright, writer, and academic (1927–2018)

- Simon in 1974
- Born: Marvin Neil Simon; July 4, 1927; New York City, U.S.
- Died: August 26, 2018 (aged 91); New York City, U.S.
- Education: New York University; University of Denver
- Occupations: Playwright; screenwriter; author
- Spouses: Joan Baim (m. 1953; died 1973) Marsha Mason (m. 1973; div. 1983) Diane Lander (m. 1987; div. 1988) (m. 1990; div. 1998) Elaine Joyce (m. 1999)
- Children: 3
- Relatives: Danny Simon (brother); Michael H. Simon (nephew)
- Writing career
- Period: 1948–2010
- Genres: Comedy; drama; farce; autobiography
- Notable works: Brighton Beach Memoirs; Biloxi Blues; Come Blow Your Horn; The Odd Couple; Lost in Yonkers; The Goodbye Girl
- Notable awards: Pulitzer Prize for Drama (1991)

Marvin Neil Simon (July 4, 1927 – August 26, 2018) was an American playwright, screenwriter and author. He wrote more than 30 plays and nearly the same number of movie screenplays, mostly film adaptations of his plays. He received three Tony Awards and a Golden Globe Award, as well as nominations for four Academy Awards and four Primetime Emmy Awards. He was awarded a Special Tony Award in 1975, the Pulitzer Prize for Drama in 1991, the Kennedy Center Honors in 1995 and the Mark Twain Prize for American Humor in 2006.

Simon grew up in New York City during the Great Depression. His parents' financial difficulties affected their marriage, giving him a mostly unhappy and unstable childhood. He often took refuge in movie theaters, where he enjoyed watching early comedians like Charlie Chaplin. After graduating from high school and serving a few years in the Army Air Force Reserve, he began writing comedy scripts for radio programs and popular early television shows. Among the latter were Sid Caesar's Your Show of Shows (where in 1950 he worked alongside other young writers including Carl Reiner, Mel Brooks, Woody Allen, Larry Gelbart and Selma Diamond), and The Phil Silvers Show, which ran from 1955 to 1959.

His first produced play was Come Blow Your Horn (1961). It took him three years to complete and ran for 678 performances on Broadway. It was followed by two more successes, Barefoot in the Park (1963) and The Odd Couple (1965). He won a Tony Award for the latter. It made him a national celebrity and "the hottest new playwright on Broadway". From the 1960s to the 1980s, he wrote for stage and screen; some of his screenplays were based on his own works for the stage. His style ranged from farce to romantic comedy to more serious dramatic comedy.

Overall, he garnered 17 Tony nominations and won three awards. In 1966, he had four successful productions running on Broadway at the same time, and in 1983, he became the first living playwright to have a Broadway theatre, the Neil Simon Theatre, named in his honor.

== Early years ==
Neil Simon was born on July 4, 1927, in The Bronx, New York City, to Jewish parents. His father, Irving Simon, was a garment salesman, and his mother, Mamie (Levy) Simon, was mostly a homemaker. Neil had one brother, eight years his senior, television writer and comedy teacher Danny Simon. He grew up in Washington Heights, Manhattan, and graduated from DeWitt Clinton High School when he was sixteen. He was nicknamed 'Doc', and the school yearbook described him as extremely shy.

Simon's childhood was marked by his parents' "tempestuous marriage" and the financial hardship caused by the Depression. Sometimes at night he blocked out their arguments by putting a pillow over his ears. His father often abandoned the family for months at a time, causing them further financial and emotional suffering. As a result, the family took in boarders, and Simon and his brother Danny were sometimes forced to live with different relatives.

During an interview with writer Lawrence Grobel, Simon said: "To this day I never really knew what the reason for all the fights and battles were about between the two of them ... She'd hate him and be very angry, but he would come back and she would take him back. She really loved him." Simon has said that one of the reasons he became a writer was to fulfill a need to be independent of such emotional family issues, a need he recognized when he was seven or eight: "I'd better start taking care of myself somehow ... It made me strong as an independent person.

I think part of what made me a comedy writer is the blocking out of some of the really ugly, painful things in my childhood and covering it up with a humorous attitude ... do something to laugh until I was able to forget what was hurting.

He was able to do that at the movies, in the work of stars like Charlie Chaplin, Buster Keaton, and Laurel and Hardy. "I was constantly being dragged out of movies for laughing too loud." Simon acknowledged these childhood films as his inspiration: "I wanted to make a whole audience fall onto the floor, writhing and laughing so hard that some of them pass out." He made writing comedy his long-term goal, and also saw it as a way to connect with people. "I was never going to be an athlete or a doctor." He began writing for pay while still in high school: At the age of fifteen, Simon and his brother created a series of comedy sketches for employees at an annual department store event. To help develop his writing skill, he often spent three days a week at the library reading books by famous humorists such as Mark Twain, Robert Benchley, George S. Kaufman and S. J. Perelman.

Soon after graduating from high school, he signed up with the Army Air Force Reserve at New York University. He attained the rank of corporal and was eventually sent to Colorado. During those years in the Reserve, Simon wrote professionally, starting as a sports editor. He was assigned to Lowry Air Force Base during 1945 and attended the University of Denver from 1945 to 1946.

== Writing career ==
=== Television ===
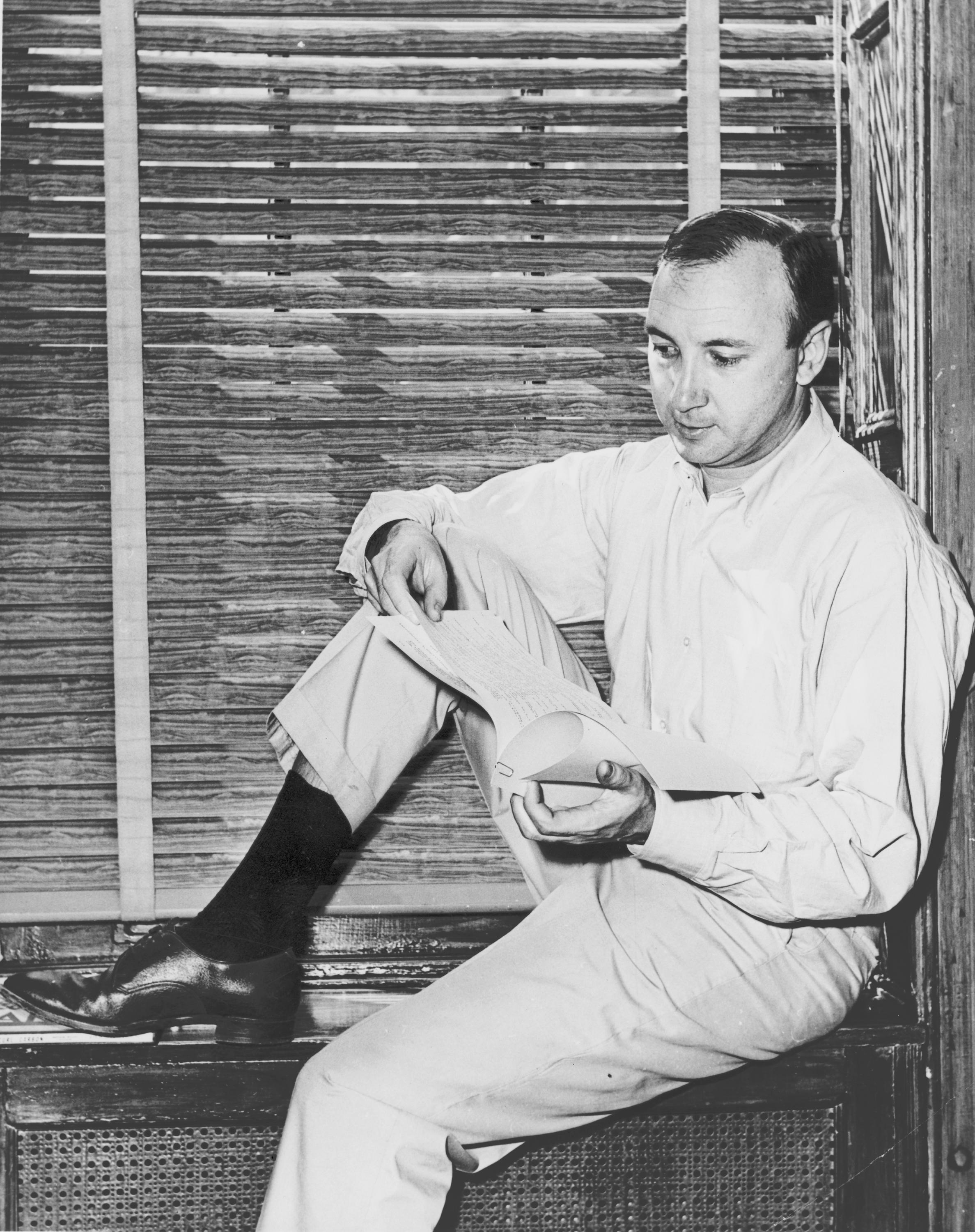
Simon in 1966

Simon quit his job as a mailroom clerk in the Warner Brothers offices in Manhattan to write radio and television scripts with his brother Danny Simon, under the tutelage of radio humorist Goodman Ace, who ran a short-lived writing workshop for CBS. Their work for the radio series The Robert Q. Lewis Show led to other writing jobs. Max Liebman hired the duo for the writing team of his popular television comedy series Your Show of Shows. The program received Emmy Award nominations for Best Variety Show in 1951, 1952, 1953, and 1954, and won in 1952 and 1953. Simon later wrote scripts for The Phil Silvers Show, for episodes broadcast during 1958 and 1959.

Simon later recalled the importance of these two writing jobs to his career: "Between the two of them, I spent five years and learned more about what I was eventually going to do than in any other previous experience." "I knew when I walked into Your Show of Shows, that this was the most talented group of writers that up until that time had ever been assembled together."

Simon described a typical writing session:

There were about seven writers, plus Sid, Carl Reiner, and Howie Morris ... Mel Brooks and maybe Woody Allen would write one of the other sketches ... everyone would pitch in and rewrite, so we all had a part of it ... It was probably the most enjoyable time I ever had in writing with other people.

Simon incorporated some of these experiences into his play Laughter on the 23rd Floor (1993). A 2001 TV adaptation of the play won him two Emmy Award nominations.

=== Stage ===
His first Broadway experience was on Catch a Star! (1955); he collaborated on sketches with his brother, Danny.

In 1961, Simon's first Broadway play, Come Blow Your Horn, ran for 678 performances at the Brooks Atkinson Theatre. Simon took three years to create that first play, partly because he was also working on television scripts. He rewrote it at least twenty times from beginning to end: "It was the lack of belief in myself", he recalled. "I said, 'This isn't good enough. It's not right.' ... It was the equivalent of three years of college." Besides being a "monumental effort" for Simon, that play was a turning point in his career: "The theater and I discovered each other."

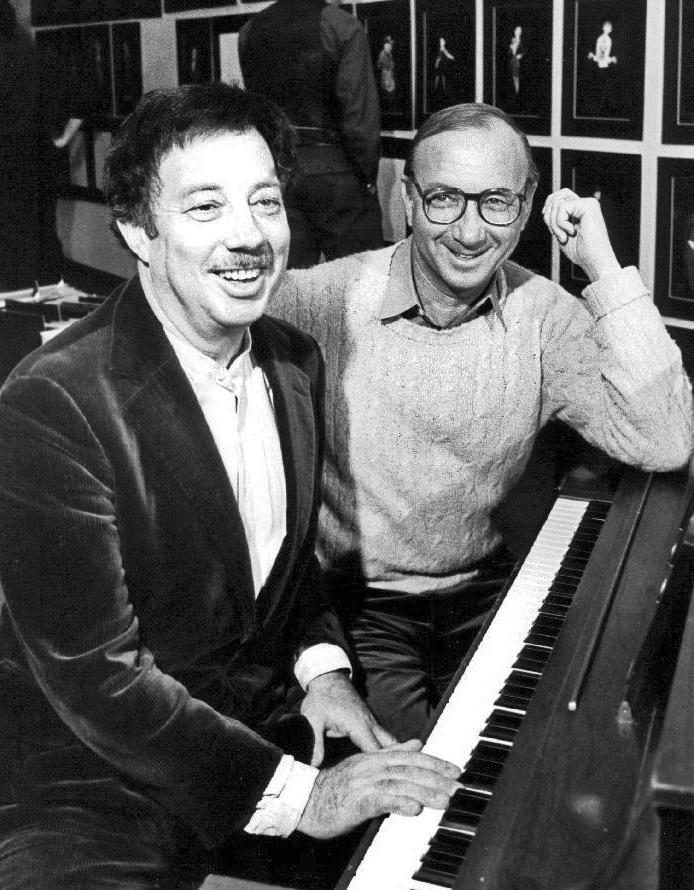
With Cy Coleman at piano rehearsing, 1982

Barefoot in the Park (1963) and The Odd Couple (1965), for which he won a Tony Award, brought him national celebrity, and he was considered "the hottest new playwright on Broadway", according to Susan Koprince. Those successes were followed by others. During 1966, Simon had four shows playing simultaneously at Broadway theatres: Sweet Charity, The Star-Spangled Girl, The Odd Couple and Barefoot in the Park. These earned him royalties of $1 million a year. His professional association with producer Emanuel Azenberg began with The Sunshine Boys and continued with The Good Doctor, God's Favorite, Chapter Two, They're Playing Our Song, I Ought to Be in Pictures, Brighton Beach Memoirs, Biloxi Blues, Broadway Bound, Jake's Women, The Goodbye Girl and Laughter on the 23rd Floor, among others. His work ranged from romantic comedies to serious drama. Overall, he received seventeen Tony nominations and won three awards.

Simon also adapted material originated by others, such as the musical Little Me (1962), based on the novel by Patrick Dennis; Sweet Charity (1966) from the screenplay for the film Nights of Cabiria (1957), written by Federico Fellini and others; and Promises, Promises (1968) a musical version of Billy Wilder's film, The Apartment. By the time of Last of the Red Hot Lovers in 1969, Simon was reputedly earning $45,000 a week from his shows (excluding sale of rights), making him the most financially successful Broadway writer ever. Simon also served as an uncredited "script doctor", helping to hone the books of Broadway-bound plays or musicals under development, as he did for A Chorus Line (1975). During the 1970s, he wrote a string of successful plays; sometimes more than one was playing at the same time, to standing room only audiences. Although he was, by then, recognized as one of the country's leading playwrights, his inner drive kept him writing:

Did I relax and watch my boyhood ambitions being fulfilled before my eyes? Not if you were born in the Bronx, in the Depression and Jewish, you don't.

Simon drew "extensively on his own life and experience" for his stories. His settings are typically working-class New York City neighborhoods, similar to the ones in which he grew up. In 1983, he began writing the first of three autobiographical plays, Brighton Beach Memoirs (1983), which would be followed by Biloxi Blues (1985) and Broadway Bound (1986). He received his greatest critical acclaim for this trilogy. He received a Pulitzer Prize for his follow-up play, Lost in Yonkers (1991), which starred Mercedes Ruehl and was a success on Broadway.

Following Lost in Yonkers, Simon's next several plays did not meet with commercial success. The Dinner Party (2000), which starred Henry Winkler and John Ritter, was "a modest hit". Simon's final play, Rose's Dilemma, premiered in 2003 and received poor reviews.

Simon is credited as playwright and contributing writer to at least 49 Broadway plays.

=== Screen ===
Simon chose not to write the screenplay for the first film adaptation of his work, Come Blow Your Horn (1963), preferring to focus on his playwriting. However, he was disappointed with the picture, and thereafter tried to control the conversion of his works. Simon wrote screenplays for more than twenty films and received four Academy Award nominations—for The Odd Couple (1969), The Sunshine Boys (1975), The Goodbye Girl (1977) and California Suite (1978). Other movies include The Out-of-Towners (1970) and Murder by Death (1976). Although most of his films were successful, movies were always of secondary importance to his plays:

I always feel more like a writer when I'm writing a play, because of the tradition of the theater ... there is no tradition of the screenwriter, unless he is also the director, which makes him an auteur. So I really feel that I'm writing for posterity with plays, which have been around since the Greek times.

Many of his earlier adaptations of his own work were very similar to the original plays. Simon observed in hindsight: "I really didn't have an interest in films then. I was mainly interested in continuing writing for the theater ... The plays never became cinematic". The Odd Couple (1968), was one highly successful early adaptation, faithful to the stage play but also opened out, with more scenic variety.

== Writing style and subject matter ==
The key aspect most consistent in Simon's writing style is comedy, situational and verbal, and presents serious subjects in a way that makes audiences "laugh to avoid weeping". He achieved this with rapid-fire jokes and wisecracks, in a wide variety of urban settings and stories. This creates a "sophisticated, urban humor", says editor Kimball King, and results in plays that represent "middle America". Simon created everyday, apparently simple conflicts with his stories, which became comical premises for problems which needed be solved.

Another feature of his writing is his adherence to traditional values regarding marriage and family. McGovern states that this thread of the monogamous family runs through most of Simon's work, and is one he feels is necessary to give stability to society. Some critics have therefore described his stories as somewhat old fashioned, although Johnson points out that most members of his audiences "are delighted to find Simon upholding their own beliefs". And where infidelity is the theme in a Simon play, rarely, if ever, do those characters gain happiness: "In Simon's eyes," adds Johnson, "divorce is never a victory."

Another aspect of Simon's style is his ability to combine both comedy and drama. Barefoot in the Park, for example, is a light romantic comedy, while portions of Plaza Suite were written as "farce", and portions of California Suite are "high comedy".

Simon was willing to experiment and take risks, often moving his plays in new and unexpected directions. In The Gingerbread Lady, he combined comedy with tragedy; Rumors (1988) is a full-length farce; in Jake's Women and Brighton Beach Memoirs he used dramatic narration; in The Good Doctor, he created a "pastiche of sketches" around various stories by Chekhov; and Fools (1981), was written as a fairy-tale romance similar to stories by Sholem Aleichem. Although some of these efforts failed to win approval from many critics, Koprince claims that they nonetheless demonstrate Simon's "seriousness as a playwright and his interest in breaking new ground."

=== Characters ===
Simon's characters are typically "imperfect, unheroic figures who are at heart decent human beings", according to Koprince, and she traces Simon's style of comedy back to that of Menander, a playwright of ancient Greece. Menander, like Simon, also used average people in domestic life settings, and also blended humor and tragedy into his themes. Many of Simon's most memorable plays are built around two-character scenes, as in segments of California Suite and Plaza Suite.

Before writing, Simon tried to create an image of his characters. He said that the play Star Spangled Girl, which was a box-office failure, was "the only play I ever wrote where I did not have a clear visual image of the characters in my mind as I sat down at the typewriter." Simon considered "character building" an obligation, stating that the "trick is to do it skillfully". While other writers have created vivid characters, they have not created nearly as many as Simon did: "Simon has no peers among contemporary comedy playwrights", stated biographer Robert Johnson.

Simon's characters often amuse the audience with sparkling "zingers", made believable by Simon's skillful writing of dialogue. He reproduces speech so "adroitly" that his characters are usually plausible and easy for audiences to identify with and laugh at. His characters may also express "serious and continuing concerns of mankind ... rather than purely topical material". McGovern notes that his characters are always impatient "with phoniness, with shallowness, with amorality", adding that they sometimes express "implicit and explicit criticism of modern urban life with its stress, its vacuity, and its materialism." However, Simon's characters are never seen thumbing their noses at society."

=== Themes and genres ===
Theater critic John Lahr believes that Simon's primary theme is "the silent majority", many of whom are "frustrated, edgy, and insecure". Simon's characters are "likable" and easy for audiences to identify with. They often have difficult relationships in marriage, friendship or business, as they "struggle to find a sense of belonging". According to biographer Edythe McGovern, there is always "an implied seeking for solutions to human problems through relationships with other people, [and] Simon is able to deal with serious topics of universal and enduring concern", while still making people laugh.

McGovern adds that one of Simon's hallmarks is his "great compassion for his fellow human beings", an opinion shared by author Alan Cooper, who observes that Simon's plays "are essentially about friendships, even when they are about marriage or siblings or crazy aunts ..."

Many of Simon's plays are set in New York City, with a resulting urban flavor. Within that setting, Simon's themes include marital conflict, infidelity, sibling rivalry, adolescence, bereavement and fear of aging. Despite the serious nature of these ideas, Simon always manages to tell the stories with humor, embracing both realism and comedy. Simon would tell aspiring comedy playwrights "not to try to make it funny ... try and make it real and then the comedy will come."

"When I was writing plays", he said, "I was almost always (with some exceptions) writing a drama that was funny ... I wanted to tell a story about real people." Simon explained how he managed this combination:

My view is, "how sad and funny life is." I can't think of a humorous situation that does not involve some pain. I used to ask, "What is a funny situation?" Now I ask, "What is a sad situation and how can I tell it humorously?"

His comedies often portray struggles with marital difficulties or fading love, sometimes leading to separation, divorce and child custody issues. After many twists in the plot, the endings typically show renewal of the relationships.

Politics seldom plays in Simon's stories, and his characters avoid confronting society as a whole, despite their personal problems. "Simon is simply interested in showing human beings as they are—with their foibles, eccentricities, and absurdities." Drama critic Richard Eder noted that Simon's popularity relies on his ability to portray a "painful comedy", where characters say and do funny things in extreme contrast to the unhappiness they are feeling.

Simon's plays are generally semi-autobiographical, often portraying aspects of his troubled childhood and first marriages. According to Koprince, Simon's plays also "invariably depict the plight of white middle-class Americans, most of whom are New Yorkers and many of whom are Jewish, like himself." He has said, "I suppose you could practically trace my life through my plays." In Lost in Yonkers, Simon suggests the necessity of a loving marriage (as opposed to his parents'), and how children who are deprived of it in their home, "end up emotionally damaged and lost".

According to Koprince, Simon's Jewish heritage is a key influence on his work, although he is unaware of it when writing. For example, in the Brighton Beach trilogy, she explains, the lead character is a "master of self-deprecating humor, cleverly poking fun at himself and at his Jewish culture as a whole." Simon himself has said that his characters are people who are "often self-deprecating and [who] usually see life from the grimmest point of view", explaining, "I see humor in even the grimmest of situations. And I think it's possible to write a play so moving it can tear you apart and still have humor in it." This theme in writing, notes Koprince, "belongs to a tradition of Jewish humor ... a tradition which values laughter as a defense mechanism and which sees humor as a healing, life-giving force."

=== Critical response ===
During most of his career, Simon's work received mixed reviews, with many critics admiring his comedy skills, much of it a blend of "humor and pathos". Other critics were less complimentary, noting that much of his dramatic structure was weak and sometimes relied too heavily on gags and one-liners. As a result, notes Kopince, "literary scholars had generally ignored Simon's early work, regarding him as a commercially successful playwright rather than a serious dramatist." Clive Barnes, theater critic for The New York Times, wrote that like his British counterpart Noël Coward, Simon was "destined to spend most of his career underestimated", but nonetheless very "popular".

Simon towers like a Colossus over the American Theater. When Neil Simon's time comes to be judged among successful playwrights of the twentieth century, he will definitely be first among equals. No other playwright in history has had the run he has: fifteen "Best Plays" of their season.

— Lawrence Grobel

This attitude changed after 1991, when he won a Pulitzer Prize for drama with Lost in Yonkers. McGovern writes that "seldom has even the most astute critic recognized what depths really exist in the plays of Neil Simon." When Lost in Yonkers was considered by the Pulitzer Advisory Board, board member Douglas Watt noted that it was the only play nominated by all five jury members, and that they judged it "a mature work by an enduring (and often undervalued) American playwright."

McGovern compares Simon with noted earlier playwrights, including Ben Jonson, Molière, and George Bernard Shaw, pointing out that those playwrights had "successfully raised fundamental and sometimes tragic issues of universal and therefore enduring interest without eschewing the comic mode." She concludes, "It is my firm conviction that Neil Simon should be considered a member of this company ... an invitation long overdue." McGovern attempts to explain the response of many critics:

Above all, his plays which may appear simple to those who never look beyond the fact that they are amusing are, in fact, frequently more perceptive and revealing of the human condition than many plays labeled complex dramas.

Similarly, literary critic Robert Johnson explains that Simon's plays have given us a "rich variety of entertaining, memorable characters" who portray the human experience, often with serious themes. Although his characters are "more lifelike, more complicated and more interesting" than most of the characters audiences see on stage, Simon has "not received as much critical attention as he deserves." Lawrence Grobel, in fact, calls him "the Shakespeare of his time", and possibly the "most successful playwright in history." He states:

Broadway critic Walter Kerr tries to rationalize why Simon's work has been underrated:

Because Americans have always tended to underrate writers who make them laugh, Neil Simon's accomplishment have not gained as much serious critical praise as they deserve. His best comedies contain not only a host of funny lines, but numerous memorable characters and an incisively dramatized set of beliefs that are not without merit. Simon is, in fact, one of the finest writers of comedy in American literary history.

== Personal life ==
Simon was married five times. For 20 years (1953–73), he was married to Joan Baim, a Martha Graham dancer; they had two daughters. Simon became a widower in 1973 when Baim died of bone cancer at age 41. One daughter, Ellen, wrote a semi-autobiographical play which was subsequently filmed as Moonlight and Valentino. Simon married actress Marsha Mason (1973–1983), that same year. After his divorce from Mason, he married actress Diane Lander two separate times (1987–1988 and 1990–1998). He adopted Lander's daughter from a previous relationship. His subsequent marriage to actress Elaine Joyce in 1999 lasted until his death.

Simon's nephew is U.S. District Judge Michael H. Simon and his niece-in-law is U.S. Congresswoman Suzanne Bonamici.

Simon was on the board of selectors of Jefferson Awards for Public Service.

In 2004, Simon received a kidney transplant from his long-time friend and publicist Bill Evans.

Simon died from pneumonia at New York-Presbyterian Hospital in Manhattan on August 26, 2018, while hospitalized for kidney failure. He was 91 and also had Alzheimer's disease.

== Awards and honors ==
Simon held three honorary degrees: a Doctor of Humane Letters from Hofstra University, a Doctor of Letters from Marquette University and a Doctor of Law from Williams College. In 1983 Simon became the only living playwright to have a New York City theatre named after him. The Alvin Theatre on Broadway was renamed the Neil Simon Theatre in his honor, and he was an honorary board of trustees member of the Walnut Street Theatre, Philadelphia, America's oldest theatre. Also in 1983, Simon was inducted into the American Theater Hall of Fame.

In 1965, he won the Tony Award for Best Playwright (The Odd Couple), and in 1975, a special Tony Award for his overall contribution to American theater. Simon won the 1978 Golden Globe Award for Best Motion Picture Screenplay for The Goodbye Girl. For Brighton Beach Memoirs (1983), he was awarded the New York Drama Critics' Circle Award, followed by another Tony Award for Best Play of 1985, Biloxi Blues. In 1991, he won the Pulitzer Prize along with the Tony Award for Lost in Yonkers (1991).

The Neil Simon Festival is a professional summer repertory theatre devoted to preserving the works of Simon and his contemporaries. The Neil Simon Festival was founded by Richard Dean Bugg in 2003.

In 2006, Simon received the Mark Twain Prize for American Humor.

== Bibliography ==
=== Television ===
Television series

Simon, as a member of a writing staff, penned material for the following shows:

- The Garry Moore Show (1950)
- Your Show of Shows (1950–54)
- Caesar's Hour (1954–57)
- Stanley (1956)
- The Phil Silvers Show (1958–59)
- Kibbee Hates Fitch (1965) (pilot for a never-made series; this episode by Simon aired once on CBS on August 2, 1965)

Movies made for television

The following made-for-TV movies were all written solely by Simon, and all based on his earlier plays or screenplays

- The Good Doctor (1978)
- Plaza Suite (1987)
- Broadway Bound (1992)
- The Sunshine Boys (1996)
- Jake's Women (1996)
- London Suite (1996)
- Laughter on the 23rd Floor (2001)
- The Goodbye Girl (2004)

=== Theatre ===
- Come Blow Your Horn (1961)
- Little Me (1962)†
- Barefoot in the Park (1963)
- The Odd Couple (1965)
- Sweet Charity (1966)†
- The Star-Spangled Girl (1966)
- Plaza Suite (1968)
- Promises, Promises (1968)†
- Last of the Red Hot Lovers (1969)
- The Gingerbread Lady (1970)
- The Prisoner of Second Avenue (1971)
- The Sunshine Boys (1972)
- The Good Doctor (1973)
- God's Favorite (1974)
- California Suite (1976)
- Chapter Two (1977)
- They're Playing Our Song (1979)†
- I Ought to Be in Pictures (1980)
- Fools (1981)
- Brighton Beach Memoirs (1983)
- Biloxi Blues (1985)
- Broadway Bound (1986)
- Rumors (1988)
- Lost in Yonkers (1991)
- Jake's Women (1992)
- The Goodbye Girl (1993)†
- Laughter on the 23rd Floor (1993)
- London Suite (1995)
- Proposals (1997)
- The Dinner Party (2000)
- 45 Seconds from Broadway (2001)
- Rose's Dilemma (2003)

† marks musicals

In addition to these plays and musicals, Simon has twice rewritten or updated his 1965 play The Odd Couple. Both updated versions have run under new titles: The Female Odd Couple (1985) and Oscar and Felix: A New Look at the Odd Couple (2002).

=== Screenplays ===
- After the Fox (with Cesare Zavattini) (1966)
- Barefoot in the Park (1967) †
- The Odd Couple (1968) †
- The Out-of-Towners (1970)
- Plaza Suite (1971) †
- Last of the Red Hot Lovers (1972) †
- The Heartbreak Kid (1972)
- The Prisoner of Second Avenue (1975) †
- The Sunshine Boys (1975) †
- Murder by Death (1976)
- The Goodbye Girl (1977)
- The Cheap Detective (1978)
- California Suite (1978) †
- Chapter Two (1979) †
- Seems Like Old Times (1980)
- Only When I Laugh (1981) ‡
- I Ought to Be in Pictures (1982) †
- Max Dugan Returns (1983)
- The Lonely Guy (1984) (adaptation only; screenplay by Ed. Weinberger and Stan Daniels)
- The Slugger's Wife (1985)
- Brighton Beach Memoirs (1986) †
- Biloxi Blues (1988) †
- The Marrying Man (1991)
- Lost in Yonkers (1993) †
- The Odd Couple II (1998)
- † Screenplay by Simon, based on his play of the same name.
- ‡ Screenplay by Simon, loosely adapted from his 1970 play The Gingerbread Lady.

=== Memoirs ===
- Simon, Neil (1996). Rewrites: A Memoir. New York: Simon & Schuster. ISBN 0-684-82672-0.
- Simon, Neil (1999). The Play Goes On: A Memoir. New York: Simon & Schuster. ISBN 0-684-84691-8.

== See also ==
- List of playwrights from the United States
- List of Jewish Academy Award winners and nominees
- List of Golden Globe winners
