= Shelter (musical) =

1973 American stage musical

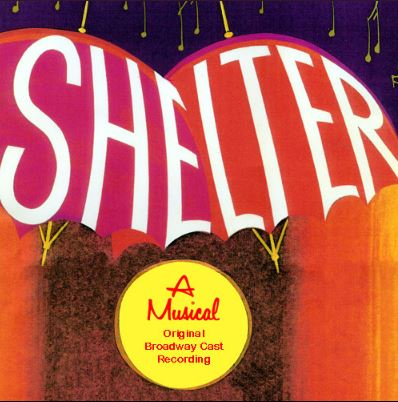
- cast album artwork
- Music: Nancy Ford
- Lyrics: Gretchen Cryer
- Book: Gretchen Cryer
- Premiere: February 6, 1973: John Golden Theatre
- Productions: 1972 (Cincinnati); 1973 (Broadway); 1997 (Off-Broadway); 2017 (Concert)

Shelter is a 1973 stage musical with book and lyrics by Gretchen Cryer, and music by Nancy Ford. The musical tells the story of a man who takes shelter from the real world in the virtual world and how his unhealthy relationship with his computer affects his real-life relationships. Marcia Rodd was nominated for the Tony Award for Best Actress in a Musical for her performance as Maud in the Broadway production.

In 2017, a concert production was staged at 54 Below starring Cryer's son, Jon Cryer.

== Synopsis ==
Michael is a television writer, who writes commercials, lives in a studio, which is really a special apartment for TV commercials, and shares it with a computer named Arthur. Arthur can sing, do strange things with back projections so that Michael can command his environment, from day to night, from country scene to moonlit stratosphere, and does party tricks. Michael has a wife and seven children. He tries to keep Maud, a distressed actress who has just lost her husband, from growing more distressed. She stays the night, but when morning comes, so does the beautiful cleaning girl who is madly in love with Michael, and then, too, his wife shows up.

== Cast and characters ==
Character	Broadway 1973	Off-Broadway 1997	Concert (2017)
Maud, an actress	Marcia Rodd	Ellen Foley	Sally Ann Triplett
Michael, a writer	Terry Kiser	Willy Falk	Jon Cryer
Wednesday November, a maid	Susan Browning	Ellen Sowney	Alyse Alan Louis
Arthur, a computer	Tony Wells	Romaine Fruge	Jeff Kready
Gloria, Michael's wife	Joanna Merlin	N/A	Lynne Halliday

== Musical numbers ==
Act 1

- "Changing" – Maud
- "Welcome to a New World" – Michael and Arthur
- "It's Hard to Care" – Maud, Michael, Arthur
- "Woke Up Today" - Maud, Arthur
- "Mary Margaret's House in the Country" – Maud, Arthur
- "Woman on the Run" – Arthur
- "Don't Tell Me It's Forever" – Maud, Michael, Arthur
- "Sleep, My Baby, Sleep" – Arthur

Act II

- "Sunrise" – Arthur
- "I Bring Him Seashells" – Wednesday November
- "She's My Girl" – Maud, Michael, Arthur
- "Shelter" – Maud
- "Too Many Women" – Arthur
- "Goin' Home With My Children" – Maud, Arthur
- "Sleep, My Baby, Sleep (reprise)" – Arthur
- "Welcome to a New World (Reprise)" - Maud, Michael, Arthur, Wednesday November
- "He's a Fool" – Maud, Wednesday November

== Productions ==
The original production started previews on Jan 22, 1973 and officially opened on February 6, 1973, at the John Golden Theatre, after an out of town tryout at the Cincinnati Playhouse in the Park during the summer of 1972. The production was directed by Austin Pendleton. Tony Walton won the Drama Desk Award for Outstanding Set Design.Clive Barnes wrote in his review in The New York Times "People liking their Broadway musicals to be bold and brassy, will not take to “Shelter.” But, people appreciating more of a chamber musical, intimate, even cozy, should find this a warmly pleasant evening.".

In 1997, an Off-Broadway production was performed in-concert with another Cryer-Ford musical, The Last Sweet Days of Isaac. The production played at the York Theatre in April of 1997.

Cryer stated during the revival process "The whole purpose [of the production] is to rework and connect these pieces that were two separate shows but were thematically connected. We discovered that the characters in Isaac and Shelter were the same two characters a few years apart. With Isaac, we felt the second act of the show was not quite as developed as the first. On the other hand, Shelter was never fully realized. It was a chamber musical we inflated to a Broadway production, and I didn't get it focused properly. So we've cut it and condensed it by eliminating one character."".

An original cast album was recorded by Columbia Records. The 1997 Off-Broadway production also recorded a cast album.

== Awards and nominations ==
=== Original Broadway production ===
Year	Award	Category	Nominee	Result
1973	Tony Award	Best Actress in a Musical	Marcia Rodd	Nominated
