= Ivar Brogger =

American actor

- Born: January 10, 1947 (age 79); St. Paul, Minnesota, U.S.

Ivar Brogger (born January 10, 1947) is an American actor of stage, motion pictures and television. He is known for his appearances in several TV shows like 24, NCIS, Star Trek: Voyager, Private Practice and a recurring role in Invasion. He had small roles in motion pictures like Rules Don't Apply, Jersey Boys, Dreamgirls, Ocean's Thirteen and Little Children.

== Early life and education ==
Brogger was born in Saint Paul, Minnesota, the son of Helga (née Bjornson), a librarian, and Arne W. Brogger, an attorney. His first name is pronounced "EE-var".

He received a B.A. and MFA from the University of Minnesota.

== Career ==
His Broadway credits include the musical Blood Brothers, Macbeth, Pygmalion, Devils Disciple, and Arsenic and Old Lace. He has also appeared in 12 Off-Broadway shows.

Film credits include Rules Don't Apply, Jersey Boys, Dreamgirls, Ocean's Thirteen and Little Children.

== Filmography ==
Year	Title	Role	Notes
1984	C.H.U.D.	Gooney NRC Man	
1989	Jacknife	Depot Mechanic	
1997	Picture Perfect	1st Ad Executive	
1997	Academy Boyz	Mr. Shepard	
1998	Senseless	Economics Coach	
1999	Seven Girlfriends	Minister	
2005	Fun with Dick and Jane	Research Scientist	
2005	Age of Empires III	Maurice of Nassau	Video game
2006	Little Children	ICU Counselor	
2006	Dreamgirls	David Bennett	
2007	Totally Baked	Reverend Finkle	Segment: "Mudslingers"
2007	The Poughkeepsie Tapes	Leonard Schway	
2007	Ocean's Thirteen	Shuffle Royale VP	
2007	Doobie Features		
2008	The Last Word	Priest	
2008	The Coverup	Judge Hallow	
2008	Private Practice	Alena's father	Episode: "Crime and Punishment"
2009	Prison Break	Vincent Sandinsky	2 episodes
2009	Lucky Bastard	Mr. Howell	
2011	Black Gold	Bellamy	
2011	Curb Your Enthusiasm	ER Doctor	Season 8, Episode 2 ("The Safe House")
2011	Criminal Minds	Minister	Episode: "With Friends Like This"
2012	Black November	Bellamy	
2012	A Green Story	Bank Manager	
2012	Grey's Anatomy	Trevor	Episode: "I Was Made for Lovin' You"
2013	Bounty Killer	Trevor	
2014	Jersey Boys	Judge	
2014	Annabelle	Dr. Burgher	
2015	The Atticus Institute	Therapist	
2015	Martyrs	Priest	
2016	Rules Don't Apply	T.V. Newsman #1	
2017	The Fosters	Doctor	2 episodes
2020	Possessions	Baxter	
