= Edward Kleban =

American composer (1939–1987)

Edward "Ed" Kleban (April 30, 1939 – December 28, 1987) was an American musical theatre composer and lyricist. Kleban was born in the Bronx, New York City, in 1939 and graduated from New York's High School of Music & Art and Columbia University, where he attended with future playwright Terrence McNally.

Kleban is best known as lyricist of the Broadway hit A Chorus Line. He and composer Marvin Hamlisch won the 1976 Tony Award for Best Original Score, and he shared the Pulitzer Prize for Drama in 1976 with Hamlisch and three other contributors to the musical. The one-woman Phyllis Newman show, The Madwoman of Central Park West (1979), featured a few tunes with his lyrics.

For several years, he worked at Columbia Records, where he produced albums by performers as diverse as Igor Stravinsky and Percy Faith, and the albums for the Off-Broadway musicals Now Is The Time For All Good Men and Jacques Brel is Alive and Well and Living in Paris.

He was a teacher for many years at the BMI Lehman Engel Musical Theater Workshop.

== Death ==
Kleban died of complications from throat cancer, aged 48, on December 28, 1987 at St. Vincent's Hospital in New York.

== Kleban Foundation ==
In his will, Kleban established the Kleban Foundation, which grants the annual Kleban Prize in Musical Theatre. The prize is given in the amount of $100,000, paid over two years, to the most promising librettist and lyricist in American musical theatre. The awards are administered by BMI in association with New Dramatists and ASCAP.

The prize has been given to 63 musical theatre artists over the past 27 years, awarding a total of around $5,000,000. Notable Kleban Prize winners include Jason Robert Brown, Steven Lutvak, John Bucchino, Robert Lopez, Adam Gwon, John Weidman, and Robert L. Friedman.

Kleban Prize Winners:

Year	Lyricist	Librettist	Judges
2025	Benjamin Velez	Madeline Meyers	Raja Feather Kelly, Clint Ramos, Rachel Sussman
2024	Rona Siddiqui	Lisa Loomer	Michael R. Jackson, Christine Toy Johnson, Elissa Adams
2023	Ryan Scott Oliver	Ethan Lipton	Leah C. Gardiner, Julia Jordan, Orville Mendoza
2022	César Alvarez	Isabella Dawis	Sarah Hammond, Or Matias, Manu Narayan
2021	Benjamin Scheuer	Melissa Li & Kit Yan	Raul Esparza, Mike Lew, Seret Scott
2020	Daniel Messé	Rehana Lew Mirza & Mike Lew	Gerard Alessandrini, Victoria Clark, Robyn Goodman
2019	Sarah Hammond / Shaina Taub (TIE)	Charlie Sohne	Alison Fraser, Amanda Green, Eric Schaeffer
2018	Alan Schmuckler / Amanda Yesnowitz (TIE)	Christian Duhamel	Marin Mazzie, Dave Malloy, Laurence Maslon
2017	Daniel Zaitchik	Lisa Kron	Kristen Anderson-Lopez, Robert Lopez, Mary Testa, Ira Weitzman
2016	Stacey Luftig	Daniel Goldstein	Judith Ivey, Michael Price, Andrew Zerman
2015	Sam Willmott	Sam Carner	Kerry Butler, Wiley Hausam, David Shire
2014	Nathan Tysen	Arthur Perlman	Jason Danieley, Colleen Jennings-Roggensack, Bill Rosenfield
2013	Daniel Maté	Alan Gordon	Sean Hartley, Henry Krieger, Michele Pawk
2012	Marcy Heisler	Andrew Gerle / Matt Schatz (TIE)	Marshall Brickman, Ted Chapin, Debra Monk
2011	Adam Gwon	Michelle Elliott	Stephen Flaherty, Michael Korie, David Zippel
2010	Peter Mills	Barry Wyner	Craig Carnelia, Susan Drury, Jeffrey Sweet
2009	Beth Falcone	Kait Kerrigan	Sheldon Harnick, Thomas Z. Shepard, Sherman Yellen
2008	David Lindsay-Abaire	Laura Harrington / Bill Solly and Donald Ward (TIE)	Beth Blickers, Linda Kline, Gilbert Parker
2007	Joe Iconis	Jeremy Desmon	Rick Elice, Carol Hall, Charles Koppelman
2006	Alison Louise Hubbard / Robert L. Freedman and Steven Lutvak (TIE)	Laurence Holzman and Felicia Needleman	Cheryl L. Davis, Susan Drury, Ken Stone
2005	David Javerbaum	Cheryl L. Davis and Ken Stone (TIE)	Julia Jordan, Michael John LaChiusa, Jeffrey Sweet
2004	Laurence O'Keefe	Julia Jordan	Susan DiLallo, Bill Goldstein, Lonny Price
2003	Nell Benjamin	Susan DiLallo	Arthur Kopit, Charles Leipart, Frank Wildhorn
2002	Jason Robert Brown	Lori McKelvey	Jerome Coopersmith, Marvin Hamlisch, Marsha Norman
2001	John Bucchino and Patrick Cook	Charles Leipart	Nan Knighton, Michael John LaChiusa, Glenn Slater
2000	Marion Adler, Chad Beguelin, Robert Lopez / Jeff Marx and David Spencer (TIE)	Stephen Cole	Fred Ebb, Henry Krieger, William Russell
1999	Kirsten Childs	Michael John LaChiusa	Lynn Ahrens, John Jiler, John Kander
1998	Sarah Schlesinger	Lissa Levin / Luis Santiero (TIE)	Ellen Fitzhugh, John Morris, John Weidman
1997	Michael Korie	Brian Crawley	Martin Charnin, James Freydberg, David Shire
1996	Glenn Slater	John Weidman	Carol Hall, William Finn, Jonathan Tunick
1995	Mark Waldrop	John Jiler	Sheldon Harnick, Charles Strouse, Wendy Wasserstein
1994	Joe Keenan / Jim Morgan (TIE)	William Strzempek	Susan Birkenhead, Craig Carnelia, Jack Viertel
1993	Barry Kleinbort	Lanie Robertson	Jerry Bock, Betty Comden, Gretchen Cryer
1992	Craig Carnelia		Lee Adams, Mary Rodgers, Stephen Schwartz
1991	Mark Campbell	Gretchen Cryer	Jerry Herman, Stephen Sondheim, Joseph Stein

== A Class Act ==
His will also granted rights to his collection of unpublished songs to friends Avery Corman and Wendy Wasserstein with the request that they incorporate them into a new musical. Their attempts failed and the rights reverted to Kleban's longtime companion, librettist Linda Kline. Kline sought someone who did not know or work with Kleban, but who would learn about him through the material. She admired previous work of Lonny Price and sought him as a collaborator.

After six years of work, with Price and Kline as co-authors, Price directed and played the role of Ed in A Class Act, a musical biography of Kleban with a score consisting of songs he wrote for numerous unproduced musicals. After a two-month run at the Manhattan Theatre Club, it transferred to the Ambassador Theatre on March 10, 2001 and ran for three additional months. Almost 14 years after his death, Kleban earned a Tony Award nomination for Best Original Score and Drama Desk nominations for Outstanding Music and Outstanding Lyrics.
