= Nancy Ford =

American composer and television writer (born 1935)

Nancy Louise Ford (born 1935) is an American composer and television writer. Recipient of Daytime Emmy, Drama Desk, Outer Critics Circle, and Obie awards, she is primarily recognized for her collaborations with lyricist Gretchen Cryer in musical theatre.

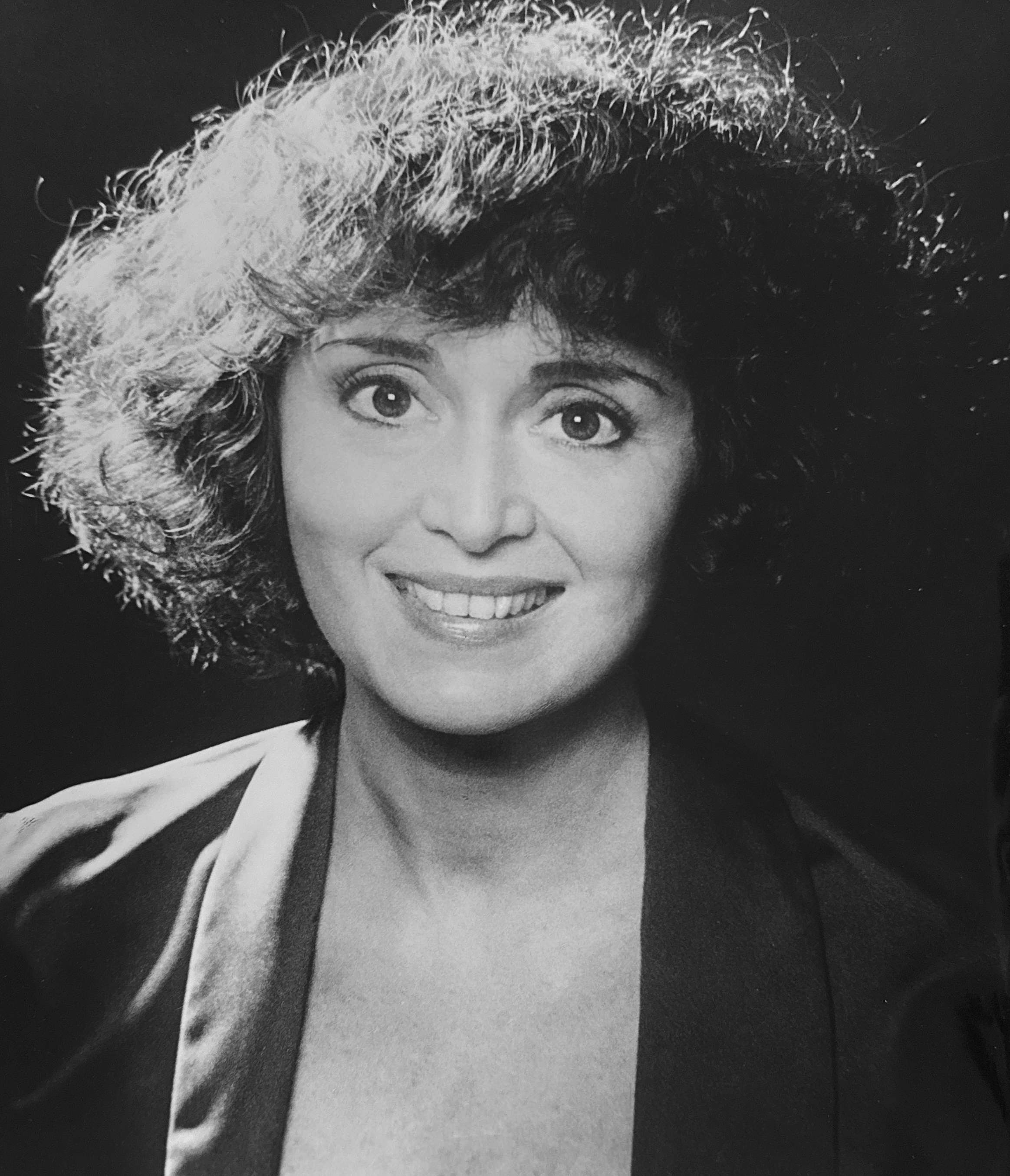
Nancy Ford, ca. 1980

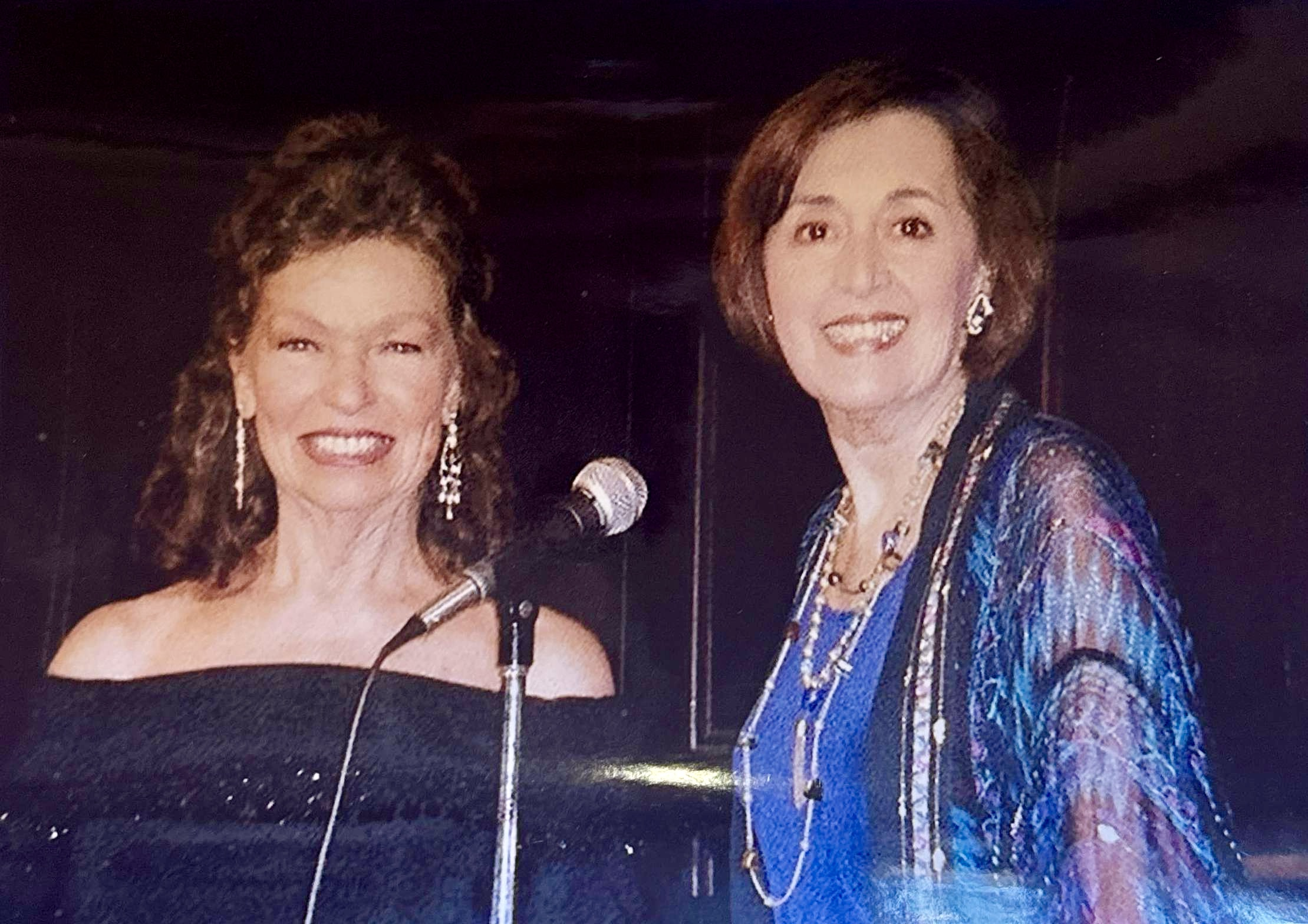
Gretchen Cryer and Nancy Ford, ca. 2005

== Early life and education ==
Nancy Ford grew up in Kalamazoo, Michigan. She attended DePauw University, a pivotal time in her life, as it was there that she met Gretchen Cryer. Their collaboration, which spans seven decades and produced thirteen musicals, began in earnest at DePauw, where they wrote two musicals for the annual Monon Revue. Their partnership continued after graduation, resulting in a third musical performed at Boston University, directed by Gretchen’s then-husband, David Cryer.

== Career ==
Nancy Ford's career in musical theatre began alongside her early professional life in New York City, where she balanced daytime secretarial work at Benton & Bowles with nighttime piano playing for Off-Broadway productions, notably Brecht on Brecht and The Fantasticks. Ford's secretarial work paved the way for a 23-year career as a scriptwriter for soap operas, including Love of Life, As the World Turns, Ryan's Hope, and Guiding Light. It was during her time with The Fantasticks that she met her husband, actor Keith Charles, with whom she shared 44 years of marriage until his death in 2008.

Ford's career is closely intertwined with her long-term partnership with Cryer. Together, they created several off-Broadway and Broadway musicals. Their most acclaimed work is The Last Sweet Days of Isaac (1970), which won the Obie Award for Best Musical. The show is a two-character musical that explores themes of alienation and connection in contemporary society. Other collaborations include:

- Now Is the Time for All Good Men (Theatre De Lys, 1967): a satirical exploration of social and political unrest through the lens of a small-town community.
- Shelter (John Golden Theatre, 1973): Examines the complexities of modern relationships.
- I'm Getting My Act Together and Taking it on the Road (Public Theatre, 1978): a middle-aged woman's journey of self-discovery and liberation from societal expectations.

Nancy Ford's work extends beyond her well-known collaborations with Cryer. She contributed arrangements and additional music to Tom Jones's The Game of Love and partnered with Mimi Turque on Blue Roses, a musical adaptation of Tennessee Williams's The Glass Menagerie. Her involvement in the theatre community includes service on the Council of the Writers Guild of America East and The Dramatists Guild Council, as a board member of the League of Professional Theatre Women/New York, and as a nominator for the American Theatre Wing's Tony Awards.

== Works ==
- For Reasons of Royalty (1955)
- Hey Angie! (1957)
- Rendezvous (1960)
- Now Is the Time for All Good Men (1967)
- The Last Sweet Days of Isaac (1970)
- Shelter (1973)
- I'm Getting My Act Together and Taking it on the Road (1978)
- Hang on to the Good Times (1986)
- Eleanor (1986)
- The American Girls Revue (1998)
- Circle of Friends (2000)
- Anne of Green Gables (2008)
- Still Getting My Act Together (2011)

== Awards and nominations ==
- 1970 Obie Award for Best Musical (The Last Sweet Days of Isaac)
- 1970 Drama Desk Award for Most Promising Musical Writer (The Last Sweet Days of Isaac)
- 1970 Outer Critics Circle Award for Best Off-Broadway Musical (The Last Sweet Days of Isaac)
- 1979 Grammy Award nomination for Best Cast Show Album (I'm Getting My Act Together and Taking it on the Road)
- 1979 Drama Desk Award nomination for Outstanding Music (I'm Getting My Act Together and Taking it on the Road)
- 1983 Daytime Emmy Award for Outstanding Writing for a Daytime Drama Series (Ryan's Hope)
- 1984 Daytime Emmy Award for Outstanding Writing for a Daytime Drama Series (Ryan's Hope)
- 1989 Daytime Emmy Award nomination for Outstanding Drama Series Writing Team (As the World Turns)
- 1991 Daytime Emmy Award nomination for Outstanding Drama Series Writing Team (As the World Turns)
- 1993 Daytime Emmy Award nomination for Outstanding Drama Series Writing Team (As the World Turns)
- 2023 Dramatists Guild of America Lifetime Achievement Award
- Honorary Doctor of Arts, Eastern Michigan University
- Honorary Doctor of Fine Arts, DePauw University
