= Haila Stoddard =

American dramatist

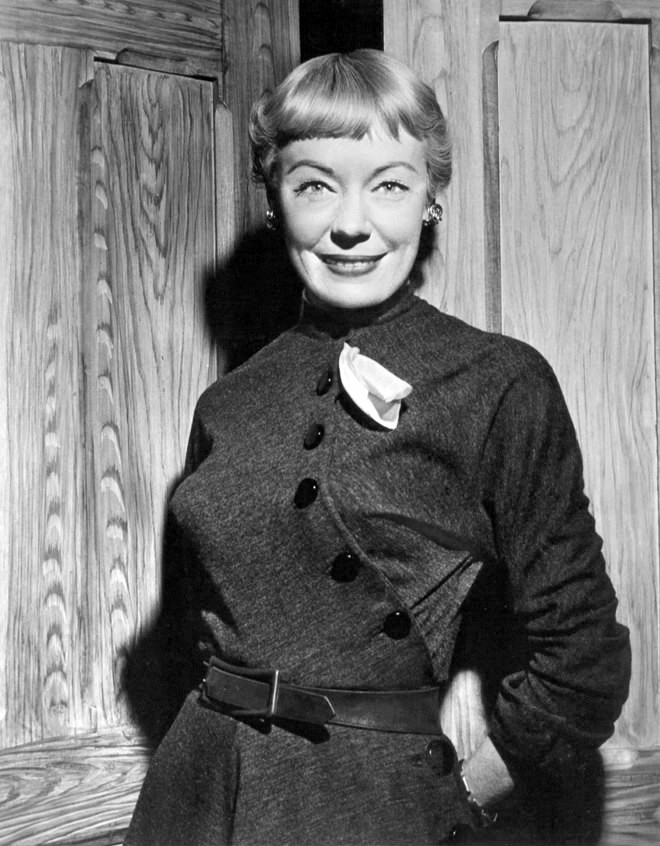
- Stoddard as Pauline in The Secret Storm, 1954.
- Born: November 14, 1913; Great Falls, Montana, U.S.
- Died: February 21, 2011 (aged 97); Weston, Connecticut, U.S.
- Occupations: Actress, producer, writer, director
- Years active: 1934–87
- Spouses: William Gude (m. 1931; div. 1935); Jack Kirkland (m. 1938; div. 1947); Harald Bromley (m. 1947; div. 1954); Whitfield Connor (m. 1956; died 1988)

Haila Stoddard (November 14, 1913 – February 21, 2011) was an American actress, producer, writer and director.

During her career as an actress, Stoddard appeared in a number of plays, movies, and television series, including sixteen years as Pauline Rysdale in The Secret Storm from 1954 to 1970. Stoddard also worked as a producer, both independently and with her production company, Bonard Productions Incorporated, which Stoddard created with Helen Bonfils in 1960. In addition to adapting plays such as Come Play with Me, and Men, Women, and Less Alarming Creatures, Stoddard also wrote plays, such as A Round With Ring (1969) and Zellerman, Arthur (1979).

== Personal life ==
Born in Great Falls, Montana, she moved from Salt Lake City to Los Angeles with her family at the age of eight, graduating from high school in 1930, married, and graduated Phi Beta Kappa from the University of Southern California in 1934 with a Bachelor of Science degree in speech, while appearing in leading roles with the National Collegiate Players.

On October 30, 1931, Stoddard married William Gude. The marriage ended in divorce in 1935. On April 3, 1938 she married Jack Kirkland with whom she had two children. The couple were divorced September 2, 1947, and on November 8 Stoddard married director-producer Harald Bromley with whom she had one child.

In 1953 Stoddard was hired as the leading lady for the Elitch Theatre summer stock cast and would play opposite leading man Whitfield Connor. Stoddard divorced Bromley in 1954 and on January 26, 1956, she and Connor married in New York City and the couple remained married until his death in 1988.

== Career ==
=== Early career ===
Stoddard's first professional stage appearance was in San Francisco in 1934 as a walk-on/under-study in a production of Merrily We Roll Along, before she succeeded to the ingenue's leading role for opening night in Los Angeles. She appeared for 65 weeks in 1935-36 as the mute Pearl in the national touring company of Jack Kirkland's Tobacco Road. She arrived on Broadway in 1937, succeeding Peggy Conklin in Yes, My Darling Daughter. She subsequently starred in A Woman's a Fool – To Be Clever, I Know What I Like, and Kindred (all 1939), Susannah and the Elders (1940), Mr. and Mrs. North (1941), The Rivals (1942), The Moon Vine and Blithe Spirit (1943), Dream Girl (1945), and The Voice of the Turtle (1947). During World War II she toured the South Pacific as Lorraine Sheldon in a 1945 USO production of The Man Who Came to Dinner. She drafted a cookbook entitled Applause and produced a short-lived play called Dead Pigeon. In the late 1960s she opened Carriage House Comestibles, a popular gourmet restaurant off the Boston Post Road in Westport, Connecticut.

She starred in Joan of Lorraine, The Trial of Mary Dugan, and The Voice of the Turtle (1947), Rip Van Winkle (1947–48), Goodbye, My Fancy, and Her Cardboard Lover (1949), Affairs of State (1950), Springtime for Henry (1951), Twentieth Century, Glad Tidings, and Biography (1952), ten summer stock productions at Denver's Elitch Gardens Theatre, and The Frogs of Spring, a revival which she co-produced with husband Harold Bromley on Broadway (1953). She took over the leading role on opening night when illness struck Constance Ford in her own Broadway production of One Eye Closed, took over for Mary Anderson in Lunatics and Lovers in 1954, and directed the national touring production. She played in Ever Since Paradise (1957), Patate (1958), and Dark Corners (1964).

Stoddard and Jack Kirkland were original share-holders in the creation of the Bucks County Playhouse in 1938; she appeared there in a total of sixteen productions from 1939 to 1958, including The Philadelphia Story, Golden Boy, The Play's the Thing, Petticoat Fever, Our Betters, Skylark, and Mr. and Mrs. North. During five seasons, she was the Playhouse's leading lady to leading men Walter Slezak and Louis Calhern. She produced her husband's plays The Clover Ring and Georgia Boy in Boston, and The Secret Room on Broadway (all 1945).

=== The Secret Storm and other television roles ===
On television Stoddard played Aunt Pauline from 1954 to 1970 on CBS-TV's The Secret Storm. In the early days of live dramatic television during the 1950s Stoddard appeared in over 100 teleplays in principal roles on CBS's Playhouse 90, Studio One, The Web, The United States Steel Hour, and Hallmark Hall of Fame, and on NBC's Goodyear Playhouse, Kraft Theatre, The Philco Television Playhouse, The Armstrong Circle Theatre and Robert Montgomery Presents. On radio she played the Little Sister with Orson Welles on Big Sister on CBS. From 1937-39 she simultaneously played Stella Dallas and three other day-time radio serials, then called washboard weepers, while appearing on stage in three different plays.

=== Bonard Productions ===
Stoddard was the first to bring the work of James Thurber and Harold Pinter to Broadway. New York Times drama critic Brooks Atkinson called her 1960 adaptation of A Thurber Carnival "the freshest and funniest show of the year". Stoddard produced A Thurber Carnival, a Tony Award-winning musical, her first production on Broadway, with Colorado heiress and friend Helen Bonfils. A later production, at the Central City Opera House, featured Thurber himself, then blind, as narrator. (Their company, Bonard, took its name from the first three letters of Bonfils, and the last three letters of Stoddard).

Combining her name with Bonfils as Bonard Productions, and associating with her New York theatrical attorney Donald Seawell, she brought to Broadway productions of Noël Coward's Sail Away (1962), The Affair by C. P. Snow (1962), her own adaptation of Thurber's The Beast In Me (1963), and the Royal Shakespeare Company's The Hollow Crown (1963), which went on to tour American colleges for four months in the spring of 1964. For Sail Away she was nominated for the Tony Award for Best Producer of a Musical. In association with Kathleen and Justin Sturm she presented That Hat!, her adaptation of The Italian Straw Hat, in 1964. She often had to handle tensions between the conservative Bonfils and flamboyant figures in entertainment, including Coward. In 1962, Stoddard asked Andy Warhol to design costumes for Thurber's The Beast in Me, after learning of Warhol through choreographer John Butler.

With Bonfils and Davis, Stoddard produced her co-adaptation, with dancer-actress Tamara Geva, of Marcel Achard's Voulez vous jouer avec moi? as Come Play with Me starring Tom Poston and Liliane Montevecchi in 1960, and with Mark Wright and Leonard S. Field premiered Harold Pinter on Broadway in 1967 with The Birthday Party. She later offered Off-Broadway productions of Coward's Private Lives (1968), co-producing with Mark Wright and Duane Wilder; Lanford Wilson's Lemon Sky (1970) and The Gingham Dog (1971), and The Last Sweet Days of Isaac, a musical by Gretchen Cryer and Nancy Ford (1970) which won three Obie awards.

With Neal Du Brock she produced The Survival of St. Joan (1971); and, with Arnold H. Levy, Lady Audley's Secret (1972) and Love, based on the play by Murray Schisgal, starring Nathan Lane (1984 Outer Critics Circle Award). Pursuing her interest in young playwrights, she produced off-Broadway productions of Glass House (1981), Casey Kurtii's Catholic School Girls (1982 Drama Desk Award), Sweet Prince (1982), Marvelous Gray (1982), and John Olive's Clara's Play (1983). Bonard presented the RSC productions of King Lear and Comedy of Errors to open the Vivian Beaumont Theater at Lincoln Center in May 1964, and her London productions of A Thurber Carnival (1962) and Sail Away (1963) played the Savoy Theatre in London's West End.

Her dramatic adaptations of Thurber material include Life on a Limb, and Men, Women, and Less Alarming Creatures, produced with The Last Flower on Boston WGBH-TV public television in 1965. In A Round with Ring she adapted Ring Lardner works which she directed in New York for the ANTA matinee series. She also directed the national touring production of Lunatics and Lovers, and she wrote original scripts entitled Abandoned Child and Bird on the Wing, and co-wrote Dahling – A Tallulah Bankhead Musical with composer-lyricist Jack Lawrence.

Stoddard also served as understudy to such acclaimed actresses as Bea Lillie, Greer Garson, Betty Field, Rosalind Russell, Uta Hagen, Mercedes McCambridge, and Jessica Tandy, in various stage productions. As Russell's stand-by, she never played the part of Auntie Mame on Broadway in 1956. Russell, when feeling infirm, would request that Stoddard sit in the wings where she could see her: "So long as I can see you ... I will never let you get on that stage", Russell said, and never relinquished, once reportedly taking the stage with a 105 degree fever. Stoddard got her chance when Russell's replacement, Greer Garson, was indisposed after her first performance in the demanding part.

Stoddard succeeded Elaine Stritch as the matinee Martha for in the original 1962 Broadway production of Who's Afraid of Virginia Woolf?, playing the part each Wednesday and Saturday afternoon, and standing by in her dressing room each evening until the curtain rose for the second act with Uta Hagen safely in command on stage. When Hagen left the Broadway production to open the show in London, Stoddard performed the role of Martha eight times a week until Mercedes McCambridge was ready to replace Hagen for the evening performances. She played with separate casts, opposite different actors. "After that stint, there was nothing more I could do on stage as an actress, so I turned to my greater fondness for writing, adapting, and producing."

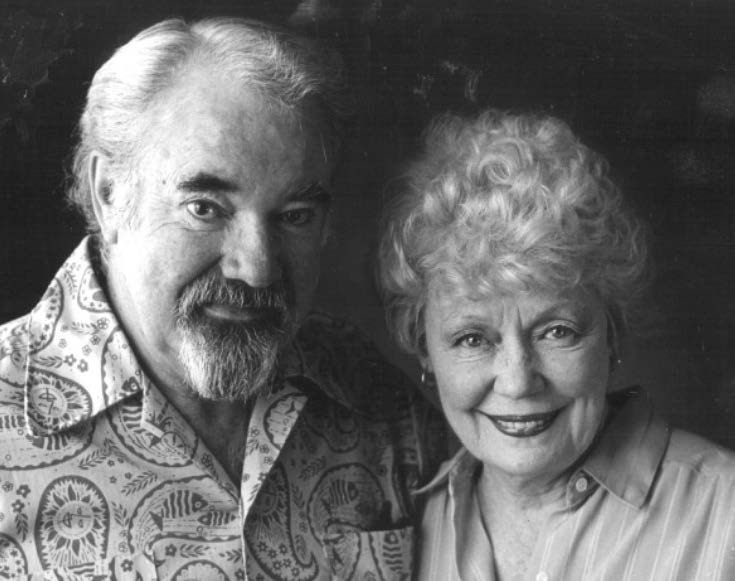
Haila Stoddard and Whitfield Connor

=== Later life ===
Following the death of Helen Bonfils in 1972, she incorporated with The Elitch Theatre Company, which produced 25 summer seasons in America's Oldest Summer Theatre in Denver, Colorado between 1962 and 1987. She simultaneously associated with Lucille Lortel to produce summer seasons at the White Barn Theatre in Westport, Connecticut, was on the Board of Directors of New Dramatists in New York City, and a Founding Member of the Westport (CT) Theatre Artists Workshop.

Stoddard died at her home in Weston, Connecticut from cardiopulmonary arrest at age 97.
