= Sarah Saltzberg =

American actress and singer

- Born: Sarah Saltzberg

Sarah Saltzberg is an American actress and singer.

== Personal life ==
Saltzberg is a native of Needham, Massachusetts, and a graduate of Boston University's theatre performance program. She also works as a real estate broker in New York.

== Career ==
Saltzberg made her Broadway debut in 2005 starring as Logainne Schwartzandgrubenierre in William Finn and Rachel Sheinkin's The 25th Annual Putnam County Spelling Bee, a role which she originated with improvisational comedy troupe The Farm. She had previously worked as a weekend nanny for playwright Wendy Wasserstein, whose influence helped bring William Finn and Rachel Sheinkin to the creative team of Spelling Bee.

Saltzberg starred in and produced the improvisation and sketch comedy show Don't Quit Your Night Job at the Ha! Comedy Club in New York City in 2007. Also she appeared in the movie City Island as the Casting Director. Saltzberg is a writer of the Off-Broadway comedy Miss Abigail's Guide to Dating, Mating, and Marriage, which ran at the Downstairs Cabaret Theatre at Sofia’s from October 24, 2010 to June 30, 2012.

Saltzberg has appeared off-Broadway as Helen in The Donkey Show, Cherry in Sinfully Rich, as Helena in A Midsummer Night's Dream, in 2005 in her one-woman show Dear Diary:The Making of Logainne Schwartzandgrubenairre (Broadway Spotlight Series, Ars Nova), as well as throughout NYC in long-form improv comedy with the Upright Citizen's Brigade.

For the past ten years, Saltzberg has been teaching improvisation to students in grades K–5 at P.S. 6 on the Upper East Side. In 2024, she appeared in two episodes of the Broadway Podcast Network's Around the Sun audio drama, written by Brad Forenza, as part of Season 4: Artists Within––a collection of small plays set amid the cosmos that features writer-performers in leading roles.

Preceded by originated role	Portraying Logainne Schwartzandgrubenierre in The 25th Annual Putnam County Spelling Bee; 2005-2007	Succeeded by Sara Inbar
