= The Last Sweet Days of Isaac =

- Original broadway cast soundtrack
- Genre: musical
- Date of premiere: January 26, 1970
- Final show: May 2, 1971
- Location: Eastside Playhouse, New York

Creative team
- book: Gretchen Cryer
- lyrics: Gretchen Cryer
- music: Nancy Ford
- director: Word Baker
- producers: Haila Stoddard, Mark Wright, Duane Wilder

The Last Sweet Days of Isaac is an American Off-Broadway rock musical by Gretchen Cryer and Nancy Ford, which premiered in 1970. It starred Austin Pendleton and Fredricka Weber, and later Alice Playten. It received positive reviews, and won three Obies, a Drama Desk Award, and an Outer Critics Circle Award. It opened at the Eastside Playhouse on January 26, 1970, and closed May 2, 1971.

== Plot summary ==
=== Part I ===
Isaac Bernstein (Pendleton) imagines himself at the brink of an untimely death, and determines to make every subsequent moment a perfect work of art. He carries with him a guitar, trumpet, other instruments, a tape recorder, and a camera. At age 33, he is stuck in an elevator with Ingrid (Weber), a secretary who longs to become a poet. During the hour they are stuck there, Isaac attempts to teach Ingrid his life philosophy.

=== Part II ===
Isaac, now 19, and Alice, are locked separately in prison cells. They communicate with each other and the outside through a TV camera and receiver in each cell. They attempt to make love to each other's image, when a newscast interrupts their tryst with a report of Isaac's death at a demonstration. The newscast ends, with the two left with each other's image, unsure if they are alive or dead.

== Production ==
- Isaac Bernstein – Austin Pendleton
- Ingrid/Alice – Fredricka Weber (replaced by Alice Playten shortly after opening)
- Other cast – Charles Collins, C. David Colson, Louise Heath, John Long
  - featuring THE ZEITGEIST
- Electric piano & harpsichord, musical direction and arrangement – Clay Fullum
- Piano – George Broderick
- Bass – Aaron Bell
- Guitar – Art Betker
- Drums – Harry Gist
- Sets – Ed Wittstein
- Costumes – Caley Summers
- Lighting – David F. Segal
- Production stage manager – T. L. Boston
- Assistant to the producer – John Toland

The director, Word Baker, was the director for the first production of The Fantasticks.

== Reception ==
Noted theatre critic Walter Kerr called it "My favorite rock musical". It won the 1970 Outer Critics Circle Award for Best Off-Broadway Musical, and the 1970 Obie Award for Best Musical. Pendleton won the Drama Desk Award for Outstanding Performance and an Obie Award for Distinguished Performance. Weber won an Obie for Distinguished Performance, and the 1970 Theatre World Award. It received positive reviews at the time. Later critics have noted the dated qualities of the musical.

== Revival ==
The show was revived in 1997, as The Last Sweet Days, a combined hybrid showing of "Isaac" and the similarly themed 1973 Cryer/Ford show Shelter, with Willy Falk as Isaac/Michael and Ellen Foley as Ingrid in both parts I and II. Directed by Worth Gardner, it received positive reviews.

== Original cast recording ==
An original cast recording, with the same name, was released in 1970, on the RCA label.

=== Track listing ===
- Side 1
1. "Overture and The Last Sweet Days of Isaac", performed by Austin Pendleton and The Zeitgeist (3:40)
2. "A Transparent Crystal Moment", Pendleton, Fredricka Weber, Zeitgeist (2:01)
3. "My Most Important Moments Go By", Weber, Pendleton (3:45)
4. "Love, You Came to Me", Pendleton, Weber, Zeitgeist (3:13)
5. "Finale", Pendleton, Weber, Zeitgeist, trumpet by Weber (4:32)
- Side 2
1. "I Want to Walk to San Francisco", The Company (1:44)
2. "I Can't Live in Solitary", John Long, Zeitgeist (1:59)
3. "Wherein Lie the Seeds of Revolution", Charles Collins, Zeitgeist (2:27)
4. "Touching Your Hand Is Like Touching Your Mind", Pendleton, Zeitgeist (1:52)
5. "Somebody Died Today", C. David Colson, Zeitgeist (2:05)
6. "Yes, I Know That I'm Alive", Louise Heath, Zeitgeist (2:15)
7. "Finale", The Company (1:16)
- Recording engineer - John Woram
- Jacket photography - Jack Mitchell

The album was produced by Steve Schwartz, who would later create such musicals as Godspell.
