= I'm Getting My Act Together and Taking It on the Road =

- Music: Nancy Ford
- Lyrics: Gretchen Cryer
- Book: Gretchen Cryer
- Productions: 1978 Off-Broadway; 1981 West End Chicago; 1979 Travelite Theatre; 1980 Drury Lane Theater; 1982 World Playhouse Los Angeles; 1982 Aquarius Theater; 1983 Earl Carrol Theater

I'm Getting My Act Together and Taking It on the Road is a musical with music by Nancy Ford and book and lyrics by Gretchen Cryer. The show premiered Off-Broadway in 1978.

== Productions ==
The musical was produced by Joseph Papp and the New York Shakespeare Festival at The Public Theater, opening on June 14, 1978 and closing on March 15, 1981 at the Circle-in-the-Square (Downtown)after 1165 performances. Directed by Word Baker, the musical featured Gretchen Cryer as Heather; Nancy Ford appeared later in the run as Heather, as did Betty Buckley, Virginia Vestoff, Carol Hall, Betty Aberlin and Phyllis Newman.

The show also had a 1981 West End production.

The show was presented by Encores! Off-Center at New York City Center in a semi-staged production in July 2013. Directed by Kathleen Marshall, the cast featured Jennifer Sanchez, Christina Sajous and Renée Elise Goldsberry.

Landi Oshinowo, a West End actress, played Heather in the production's limited run at the Off-West End Jermyn Street Theatre in July 2016. Matthew Gould served as the show's director. The show's first UK revival was with this production.

== Concept ==
The lead, Heather, is a 39-year-old divorcée attempting a comeback as a pop star. Generally considered a feminist vehicle, the plot centers on her displaying new material for her manager without relying on showbiz clichés. However, "The collaborators are emphatic that they never meant the musical to be a feminist declaration. 'We were writing about relationships between men and women, not about women’s roles in society as a whole,' explains Ford."

== Synopsis ==
Manager Joe Epstein returns from a trip and finds his star Heather Jones on stage at a nightclub, singing her own songs about the emancipation of women, together with the two singers Alice and Cheryl and the band. She tells Joe Epstein that this would be her new show. Joe, who has been Heather's friend for a long time, reacts angrily to Heather's change, but he is not able to persuade Heather to go back to her usual role. Almost 40 years old, she feels that the time has come for a change. Joe finds the songs she is singing now unpleasant, because they remind him of the way he treats his own wife. Heather is determined to support women's liberation; she splits up with her manager and goes on to perform her own show.

== Popular culture ==
The play was parodied by Andrea Martin and Catherine O'Hara on Second City Television as "I'm Taking My Own Head, Screwing It On Right, and No Guy's Gonna Tell Me it Ain't" in 1981.

== Cast ==
=== New York production ===
- Heather Jones - Gretchen Cryer
- Joe Epstein, Manager - Joel Fabiani
- Alice - Margot Rose
- Cheryl - Betty Aberlin
- Jake - Don Scardino, (created by Kevin Weyl who took the role through previews, and James Mellon taking over the role before the opening at Circle in the Square)
  - The Band
- Piano - Scott Berry
- Guitar - Lee Grayson
- Drums - Bob George
- Bass/Flute - Dean Swenson

=== London production ===
- Heather Jones - Diane Langton
- Joe Epstein, Manager - Ben Cross
- Alice - Megg Nicol
- Cheryl - Nicky Croydon
- Jake - Greg Martyn
  - The Band
- Musical Director - Stuart Pedlar
- Guitar - John Murphy
- Drums - Tony Layzell
- Bass - Bernard Shaw

== Songs ==
- Natural High
- Smile
- Miss America
- Strong Woman Number
- Dear Tom
- Old Friend
- In a Simple Way I Love You
- Put in a Package and Sold
- Feel the Love
- Lonely Lady
- Happy Birthday
- If Only Things Was Different (Added for London Production)

== Reception ==
Reviews were generally negative. In the New York Times, Richard Eder wrote “Self-celebration is the affliction of I'm Getting My Act. Its songs and skits spell out the conflicts—the little girl who has to smile for her daddy; the wife who has to pick up her husband's socks and talk baby talk to him; the liberated women who find that men don't much like them—with little individual perception, imagination or rigor. The lyrics, and the music, are effortless and not in the best sense of the word.” Despite negative reviews, the play performed well with audiences and ran for almost three years.
