= Whitfield Connor =

American actor, director and producer

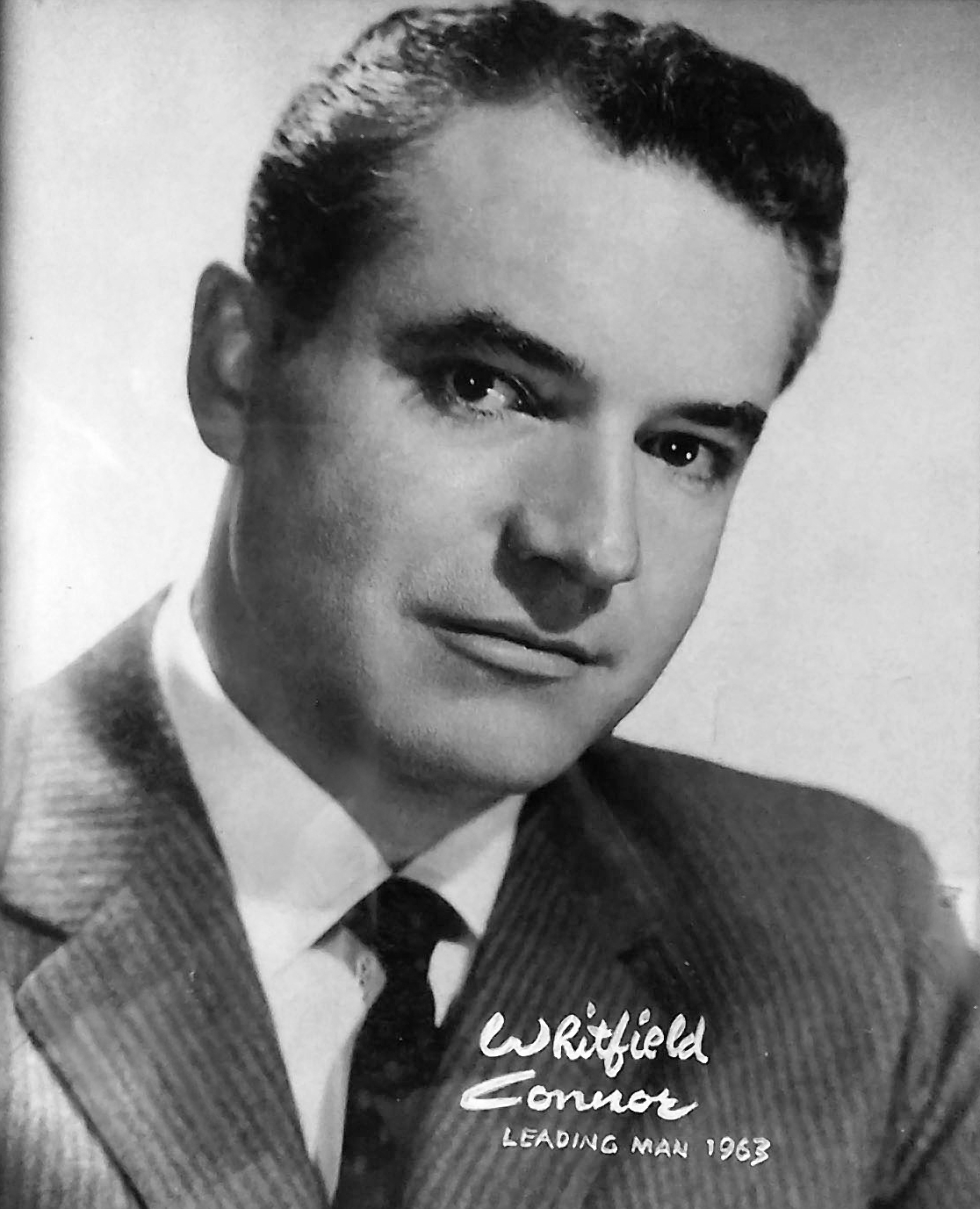
- Born: December 3, 1916; Rathdowney, Ireland
- Died: July 16, 1988 (aged 71); Norwalk, Connecticut
- Occupation(s): Actor, director and producer
- Spouse: Haila Stoddard (m. 1956–1988)

Whitfield Connor (December 3, 1916 – July 16, 1988) was an American actor, director and producer.

== Career ==
Connor started in radio in the 1930s.

In 1945 he made his Broadway debut as Horatio in a production of Hamlet and by 1948 had won his first theatrical award, a Theatre World Award for his portrayal of Macduff in Macbeth starring Michael Redgrave.

In 1960 Connor appeared on Broadway playing the father of Jane Fonda's character in There Was a Little Girl. He stepped into the play almost at the last minute when Louis Jean Heydt collapsed and died in the wings during the Boston run. The next morning he was asked to take over the role and he studied the part on the plane from New York to Boston.

He appeared in the films Tap Roots, Scarlet Angel, Prince of Pirates, The President's Lady, City of Bad Men, The Saracen Blade and BUtterfield 8.

He appeared in the television series The Bigelow Theatre, Guiding Light, Dragnet, The Loretta Young Show, Studio One, The Star and the Story, The Millionaire, Willy, Front Row Center, The Big Story, Decoy, The Phil Silvers Show and The Doctors, among others. Connor was also the commercial spokesperson for the Gulf Oil Corporation, most notably during their sponsorship of NBC News programs (including coverage of NASA space missions) in the early 1960s.

== Elitch Theatre ==
In 1948 Connor became a member of the resident theatre company at the Elitch Theatre in Denver, Colorado. This was "an association with the theatre that was to last for the rest of his life." The following year Connor returned to the theatre as the leading man in the summer stock cast and would continue in that role through 1953. He would later return for select productions.

In 1964 he became the general manager of the Theatre under producer Helen Bonfils. Together, they switched the theatre from a summer stock format where the cast was selected for the entire summer and would perform multiple plays, to a Star Package System where they would bring in touring shows, usually led by a well-known star. Following Bonfils death, Connor took over as Producer with his wife, Haila Stoddard. Connor, Stoddard, and Stoddard's son, Christopher Kirkland, continued with the theatre until it closed in 1987.

1967, Connor was elected president of the Council of Stock Theaters.

== Personal life ==
Whitfield Connor married Helen Catherine Clausen on 1 November 1941 and they had a daughter Erin Catherine Connor 31 August 1947.

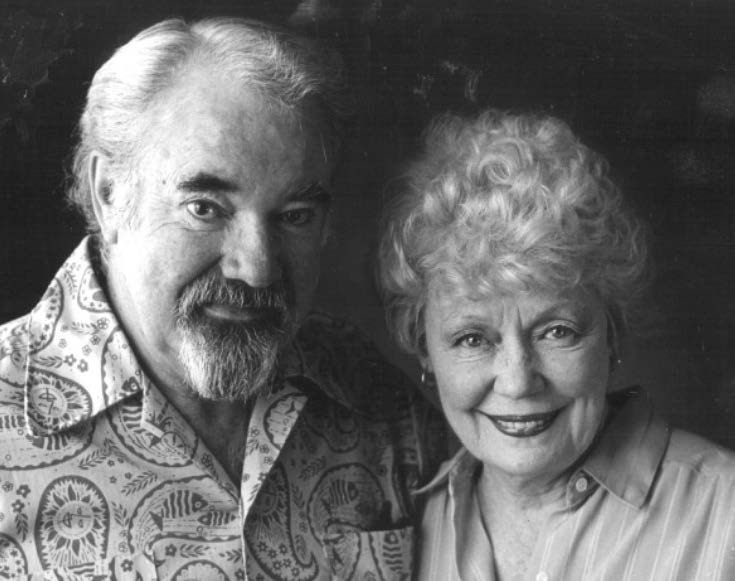
Whitfield Connor and Haila Stoddard

Connor and Stoddard met in 1953 when he was again the leading man for the Elitch Theatre summer season and Stoddard was hired to be the leading lady. They married in New York City on January 26, 1956, and they remained together until his death in 1988.

Connor died on July 16, 1988, at age 71, following stomach surgery in Norwalk, Connecticut.
