= François Clemmons =

American actor and singer

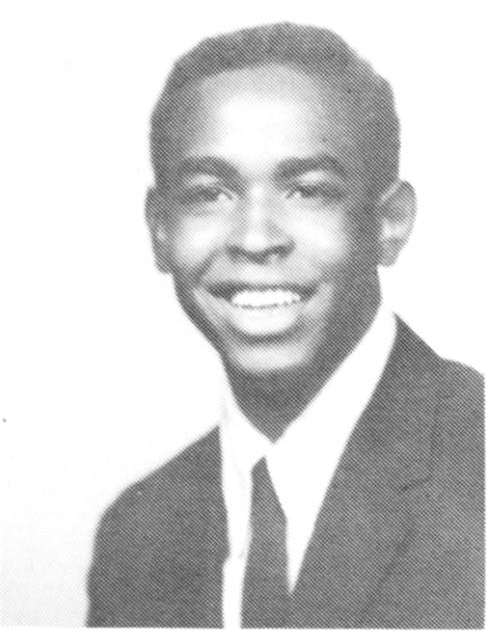
- Clemmons in Oberlin College's 1967 yearbook
- Born: François Scarborough Clemmons; April 23, 1945 (age 81); Birmingham, Alabama, U.S.
- Education: Oberlin College; Carnegie Mellon University
- Occupations: Singer; actor; lecturer
- Years active: 1968–2013
- Notable credit: Officer Clemmons in Mister Rogers' Neighborhood
- Spouse: Carol Clemmons (div. 1974)

François Scarborough Clemmons (born April 23, 1945) is an American singer, actor, writer and teacher. He is known for his appearances as "Officer Clemmons" on the PBS television series Mister Rogers' Neighborhood from 1968 to 1993.

== Early life and education ==
Clemmons was born in Birmingham, Alabama, and raised in Youngstown, Ohio. When it was discovered that he had an excellent singing voice, he began performing locally at church functions. He became choir director of his church at the age of 10. His first songs were the spirituals of pre-Civil War America, passed down to him by his mother. He soon branched out across genres, singing with various community groups. For a while, he was the lead singer of a rock 'n' roll group called the Jokers.

Clemmons received a Bachelor of Music degree from Oberlin College, and a Master of Fine Arts from Carnegie Mellon University. He also received an honorary degree of Doctor of Arts from Middlebury College.

== Metropolitan Opera ==
In 1968, Clemmons won the Metropolitan Opera auditions in Pittsburgh, Pennsylvania. He went to Cleveland, Ohio, where he won a position in the Metropolitan Opera Studio. He sang there professionally for seven seasons, performing over 70 roles with companies including The New York City Opera, Los Angeles Civic Light Opera and Washington Civic Opera.

Clemmons sang with numerous orchestras, including the Cleveland Orchestra, the Pittsburgh Symphony Orchestra and the Philadelphia Orchestra. In 1976, he won a Grammy Award for a recording of Porgy and Bess; he performed the role of "Sportin' Life" over 100 times.

== Mister Rogers' Neighborhood ==
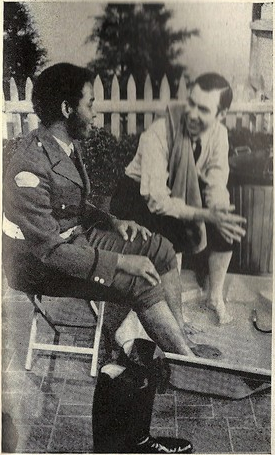
Mister Rogers and Officer Clemmons having a foot bath in 1969

For 25 years, Clemmons performed the role of Officer Clemmons, a friendly neighborhood policeman, in the "Neighborhood of Make-Believe" on the children's television show Mister Rogers' Neighborhood. In the neighborhood itself, Clemmons ran a singing and dance studio located in the building diagonally across the street from Mister Rogers' house. He was one of the first African Americans to have a recurring role on a children's TV series, and his presentation – as both a beloved neighbor to Mister Rogers and as a respected authority figure – has been described as a ground-breaking message in race relations. For example, in 1969, when racially integrated community swimming pools were still controversial, Mr. Rogers invited Officer Clemmons to cool his feet with him in a small, plastic wading pool. Mr. Rogers lent Officer Clemmons a towel to dry his feet and then used the same towel to dry his own feet, breaking a well-known color barrier. Clemmons told the story of how he became "Officer Clemmons" on StoryCorps.

== The Harlem Spiritual Ensemble ==
In the late 1980s, Clemmons had an experience singing spirituals with a friend that left him profoundly moved. The experience led him away from operatic performance toward an earlier love: traditional spirituals:

I was enjoying the singing of these spirituals ... I was giving artistry in a way – I was giving my art in a way that I had not felt it was so important as when I was singing Mozart – or when I was singing Schubert – or Donizetti or Bellini ... I began to ask Fred Rogers why there was no professional ensemble that sang spirituals comparable to a Haydn Society or a St. Cecilia Society or a Handel Society or Bach.

When he was unable to find a society like the one he envisioned, Clemmons decided to create one: The Harlem Spiritual Ensemble was dedicated to preserving the American Negro spiritual.

== Middlebury College ==
From 1997 until his retirement in 2013, Clemmons was the Alexander Twilight Artist in Residence and director of the Martin Luther King Spiritual Choir at Middlebury College in Middlebury, Vermont. He "played the role of professor, choirmaster, resident vocal soloist, advisor, confidant, and community cheerleader". He is also well-known in the Middlebury community for his acclaimed rendition of "The Star Spangled Banner", which he sings at the Middlebury College men's basketball games.

== Writing and arranging ==
On May 15, 2020, Clemmons published his autobiography, Officer Clemmons: A Memoir.

Clemmons writes across genres for a variety of age groups. Currently, he is writing a children's story entitled ButterCup and the Majic Cane and a volume of poetry entitled A Place of my Own. His published works include a volume of spirituals named Songs for Today and a stage musical called My Name Is Hayes based on the life of Roland Hayes. He also commissioned a choral work composed of spirituals entitled Changed My Name, arranged by Linda Twine.

== Personal life ==
While attending Oberlin College, Clemmons realized that he was gay, but remained closeted, fearing disapproval from his religious family and the community. In 1968, Fred Rogers told Clemmons that, while his sexuality did not matter to him personally, Clemmons could not be "out" and continue appearing on Mister Rogers' Neighborhood, because of the scandal that would arise. In the late 1960s, Rogers and others suggested that Clemmons get married as a way to deal with his sexual orientation, which he did. His marriage to his wife Carol did not work out, and Clemmons divorced in 1974 so that he could live openly as a gay man. Rogers remained personally supportive of Clemmons, but required him to avoid any indication of his homosexuality on the program, such as the earring he began to wear as a signifier. Rogers later revised his counsel to Clemmons as countless gays came out more publicly following the Stonewall riots in 1969. Rogers even urged Clemmons to enter into a long-term, stable gay relationship, and he always warmly welcomed Clemmons' gay friends whenever they visited the television set in Pittsburgh.

Clemmons lives and works in Middlebury, Vermont, where he is the Emeritus Artist in Residence of Middlebury College. He is a member of Phi Mu Alpha Sinfonia, the national fraternity for men in music. In 2021, Clemmons preserved three spirituals as part of his scripted role in Brad Forenza's episodic audio drama, Around The Sun. "My character is a one-cell amoeba who is likened to a long-distance runner in New York City... The story is a reflection of things a person goes through during a lifetime... It was powerful," Clemmons offered. In 2023, Clemmons returned to the series, offering a jug-band-inspired rendition of Forenza's original work "The Arthropod Song," a piece originally conceived as part of Forenza and Shane Bordeau's Public Figure Songbook album from 2013. (The song appeared in the Season 3: Pinecones finale.)

Clemmons continues to advance his life's work through regular public appearances and concert performances.
