= David Cryer =

American actor (born 1936)

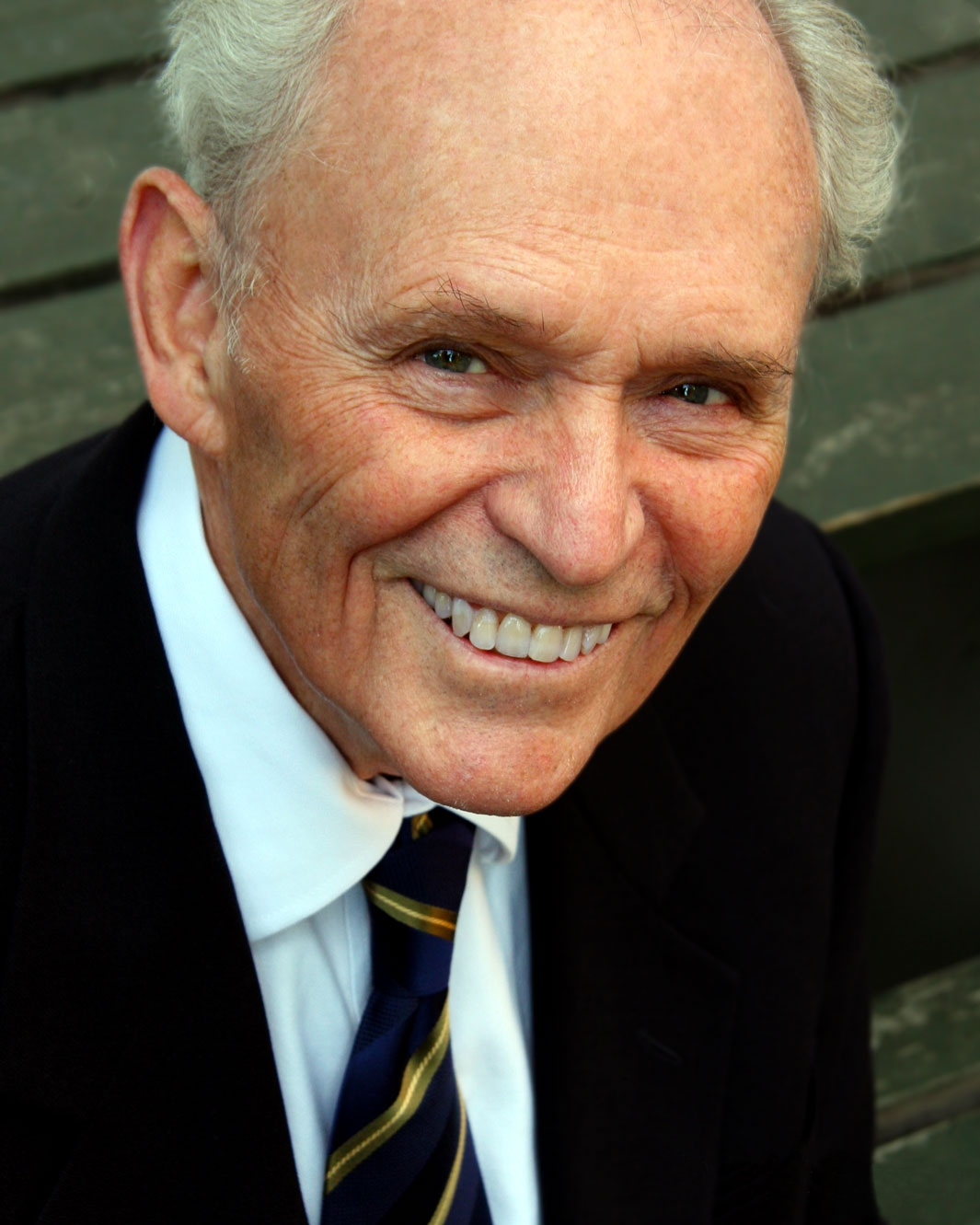
- Cryer in 2000
- Born: Donald David Cryer; March 8, 1936 (age 90); Evanston, Illinois, U.S.
- Occupation: Actor
- Years active: 1967–1991
- Spouses: Gretchen Kiger (m. 1958; div. 1971); Margaret Elizabeth Swanson (m. 1973)
- Children: 6, including Jon Cryer

Donald David Cryer (born March 8, 1936) is an American stage, television and film actor and one of the founders of San Francisco's American Conservatory Theater which began in Pittsburgh and New York's Mirror Repertory Theatre. He may be best known for the role of Firmin in The Phantom of the Opera, which he has played for nearly 19 years on the road and on Broadway. He has also played more performances of the Bernstein Mass, as The Celebrant, including at the Metropolitan Opera and the John F. Kennedy Center for the Performing Arts; and more performances as Juan Peron in Evita than any other actor. He is the father of actor Jon Cryer.

== Early life ==
Donald David Cryer was born in Evanston, Illinois, to Pauline (née Spitler) and Donald Walter Cryer, a Methodist minister in the West Ohio Conference. At the time of his birth, his father was attending Garrett Biblical Institute at Northwestern University. He grew up in Toledo, Carey, Westerville, and Findlay, Ohio, where his father served congregations; he graduated from Findlay High School in 1954. He has three siblings: Jonathan Douglas, a retired professor of statistics and actuarial science at The University of Iowa, Daniel Walter Cryer, author of a biography of theologian Forrest Church as well as a former Newsday critic and Pulitzer Prize finalist, and Mary Kathleen "Kathy", a teacher. His mother, Pauline, died in 1952. His father married Mary Garrison in 1955, adding step-siblings William, Katherine, and Rebecca Garrison.

He graduated from DePauw University in Greencastle, Indiana, in 1958, with a B.A. in history with honors including the Walker Cup, given to the senior who has contributed the most to DePauw, the Gold Key awarded to juniors for leadership and scholarship, and the Lewis Sermon Award for an original sermon. He became deeply involved in music, playing trombone in the orchestra, and Ray North's dance band, and singing in The Lost Chords, a quartet modeled on The Four Freshmen, the University Choir, the Collegians, Opera Workshop, the SDX Revue, and the Monon Revue. He was president of the Student Senate and pledge trainer at Sigma Chi.

Upon graduation in 1958, Cryer accepted a Rockefeller Fellowship to study for the ministry at Yale Divinity School. He applied to Harvard Law School and was enrolled in the fall of 1959, but was in a production of Oklahoma! as Curly at the Polka Dot Playhouse in Bridgeport, Connecticut that summer and decided to go into theater instead. He enrolled at Boston University and earned an MFA in directing in 1961.

In 1961, Cryer served in the U.S. Army at Fort Dix, New Jersey as a private and then entered the Army Reserves in 1962 for six years.

== Stage career ==
Cryer played in 13 Broadway shows, including Firmin in The Phantom of the Opera, Juan Peron in Evita, Rutledge in 1776 musical, Ari in Ari, The Red Shadow in The Desert Song, and Jude Scribner in Come Summer. Leading roles off Broadway were in The Fantasticks, The Streets of New York, Mademoiselle Colombe, 'Now is the Time for All Good Men' and The Making of Americans. On the road he played opposite Anna Maria Alberghetti in West Side Story, Giorgio Tozzi and Ricardo Montalbán in The King and I, Dyan Cannon in I Do! I Do!, Debby Boone in The Sound of Music, and Judy Kaye in Sweeney Todd: The Demon Barber of Fleet Street.

When he opened in Come Summer in 1969, Clive Barnes of The New York Times said, "Mr. Cryer will return. Anyone who looks a little like Rudolph Nureyev and sounds like Franco Corelli will not have much to worry about in the future." Frank Rich of the Times said his Juan Peron in Evita was "first-rate" while John Corry, also of the Times said it was "perfect". He has been a guest soloist with The Mormon Tabernacle Choir on two occasions.

In 1983, Cryer joined The Mirror Theater Ltd's Mirror Repertory Company in their first repertory season, performing in the plays Paradise Lost, Rain, Inheritors, and The Hasty Heart. In 1992, he played Molokov in the Paper Mill Playhouse production of Chess.

DePauw University awarded Cryer an Alumni Citation in 1998, an Alumni Achievement Award in 2006, and the honorary degree Doctor of Arts in 2009.

Albert Poland and Cryer produced the National Tour of The Fantasticks, and the New York production of the Gretchen Cryer and Nancy Ford musical Now Is the Time for All Good Men.

In 1966, Cryer was one of the founders of the American Conservatory Theater in Pittsburgh, which shortly thereafter moved to San Francisco. In 1983 he joined with others to create New York's Mirror Repertory Theatre, starring Geraldine Page.

== Personal life ==
Cryer and his first wife, the songwriter Gretchen Cryer, are the parents of the actor Jon Cryer and Robin Cryer Hyland. With his second wife, the dancer and actress Britt Swanson, he is the father of four children: Rachel, Daniel, Carolyn, and Bill.

== Filmography ==
- Escape from Alcatraz (1979) – Wagner
- American Gigolo (1980) – Lt. Curtis
- New York Stories (1989) – Suit (segment "Life Lessons")

== Accolades ==
Year	Group	Award	Result	Work
1970	NA	Theater World	Won	Come Summer
1972	NA	Obie Award	Nominated	The Making of Americans
1988	Best Actor	Detroit Free Press Award	Won	Sweeney Todd
