= Now Is the Time for All Good Men =

- Music: Nancy Ford
- Lyrics: Gretchen Cryer
- Book: Gretchen Cryer
- Productions: 1967 Off-Broadway

Now Is the Time for All Good Men is a musical with music by Nancy Ford, book and lyrics and by Gretchen Cryer. The show premiered Off-Broadway in 1967.

== Production ==
The musical premiered Off-Broadway at the Theatre De Lys on September 26, 1967 and closed on January 16, 1968.

== Synopsis ==
The school board for the Bloomdale, Indiana, high school is convinced Mike Butler (David Cryer), the new English teacher, is a brash freethinker who is willing to teach students in unconventional ways and give them too much freedom for the board's liking. Albert McKinley (David Sabin), the principal, defends him.

Sarah Larkin (Sally Niven), music teacher and church choir leader, is another of Albert's foundlings. Mike and Sarah meet and are attracted to each other. Mike tries to change her personality to suit his desires, and Sarah disapproves, but they enjoy their time together.

For a while Mike and Sarah enjoy their teatimes and hayrides left alone. But Sarah has an enemy, her own sister, Eugenie Seldin (Judy Frank), a lively and outspoken waitress at the local truck-stop eatery. Eugenie spots Mike right away and sets her sights. After all, hadn't she known Sarah's late husband in ways Sarah never did?

And soon enough, Mike develops an enemy of his own. The brightest kid in class, Tommy (Steve Skiles) is the son of the athletic coach, Herbert Heller (Art Wallace), who doesn't like English teachers to begin with because their drama classes mess up his gym floor. When he finds out that Mike is encouraging young Tommy to read Thoreau and think for himself, well, he can spot a Commie pretty far off.

And Herbert Heller is a real "Americun". Only once a year he's apt to get drunk and shoot up the place. This year, as Mike and Sarah stand listening to Christmas carolers and enjoy being together, he comes upon them, carrying a shotgun in one hand, and Old Glory in the other. When he demands that Mike pledge allegiance to the flag, then and there, it gets kind of tight. Luckily, Herbert is too drunk to be effective and falls down. Mike carries Sarah off over his shoulder and Herbert is taken away for another year.

By now, Sarah is enchanted with Mike, thought resisting him ("I'm not going to be a challenge to you and have you have the satisfaction of seeing me develop!") But develop she does. And by now young Tom Heller is actively practicing civil disobedience, though in a kind of tentative way. With some effort he manages to get himself jailed for the night, though Mike explains that this isn't strictly necessary. Tommy's girlfriend, Ramona (Anne Kaye), is trying to keep up with him. But Tommy can't see it. Was there a Mrs. Davy Crockett? A Mrs. Jim Bowie? Please. He'd rather do it all alone.

The kindly townspeople, good-hearted as they come, overlook Herbert's shotgun shenanigans and nominate him for Man of the Century in the coming Centennial Celebration. Tommy just can't see his old man as "having influenced the entire population of Bloomdale" (Of course he doesn't know him the way other people do.) So Tommy nominates Mike Butler. Herbert finds this upsetting ("I'll tan your hide, boy.) and calls Mike a pantywaist.

There is to be a mock wedding at the Centennial, Sarah as mock-bride, Albert McKinney as mock-groom. But Albert comes to Sarah and proposes. He offers a real wedding, in Civil War costume, horse-drawn vehicles, a shivaree, and then a simple life thereafter. (It's just that the Centennial seemed the perfect time--and it only comes every 100 years.") Sarah demurs. She's in love with Mike.

Tommy has a real campaign going to elect Mike the Man of the Century. If Mike were elected, maybe he could even get rid of that smell from the canning factory. Tommy's father reacts by nudging Tommy toward enlistment in the Army. He wants his boy to be an athlete, a hero or, at the very least, a star on the memorial monument.

Sarah tells Albert she's in love with Mike, and Albert takes steps. He goes to her sister to ask a favor. Eugenie must tell Sarah that Mike was in prison and, worse, to say that Mike told her all about it when they were together "listening to records." This happens as planned, and has the expected effect. Sarah is appalled. ("A criminal is a criminal is a criminal.") Mike says he was in the Army during Vietnam, but he couldn't kill anyone. For this, he spent five years in the penitentiary. His mistake had been not being a conscientious objector in the first place. Albert and Sarah become engaged.

The Centennial Celebration turns into a kind of trial. Eugenie, beautifully drunk, appears and shouts out the secret of Mike's past. When he speaks to defend himself, Mike finds himself in a kind of kangaroo court, surrounded by his peers. "Fire Him!" shouts Herbert, and McKinley does. But it also becomes apparent to Sarah that Albert knew about Mike all along. And at last she sees through his sanctimonious disguise.

Tommy says goodbye to Mike Butler. Tommy and Ramona are together now, and it is very clear that they, at least, are going to be all right. But what about Butler? He'll go to some other town, some town probably a good deal like this one. Tommy says maybe he'll be a teacher too. They embrace.

Now you just can't do a thing like that. Herbert Heller sees his boy Tommy embraced by this "Commie queer" and he gets his shotgun and fires it right at him. But of course Helbert is the "true example of American manhood" and gets elected Man of the Century anyway. So it's all right. Even if he isn't much of a shot anymore. A man can't do everything well. All he can do is try. And "Now Is The Time For All Good Men" to do just that. [ Burr, Charles (1967). Now Is The Time For All Good Men (album liner notes). p. 8. ]

== Cast and crew ==
The show was directed by Word Baker, set by Holly Haas, costumes by Jeanne Button, lighting by Carol Rubinstein, musical direction by Stephen J. Lawrence and the album produced by Edward Kleban.

The cast included Sally Niven (a pseudonym for Gretchen Cryer), Judy Frank, David Cryer, Donna Curtis, David Sabin, Margot Hanson, Regina Lynn, Art Wallace, John Bennett Perry, Murray Olson, Anne Kaye, and Steve Skiles.

== Musical numbers ==
- "What's in the Air?"
- "Keep 'Em Busy"
- "Tea in the Rain"
- "Halloween Hayride/Katydid"
- "See Everything New"
- "Stuck-Up"
- "He Could Show Me"
- "All Alone"
- "My Holiday"
- "Down Through History"
- "Good Enough for Grandpa"
- "A Simple Life"
- "A Star on the Monument"
- "Rain Your Love on Me"
- "There's Goin' to Be a Wedding"
- "Finale: Quintet"
