= The Workshop (play) =

- Written by: Torrey Townsend

Premiere
- Date: July 27, 2017
- Place: New York, New York (HB Playwrights Theatre)
- Official website

The Workshop is a 2017 Off-Broadway play written by Torrey Townsend and produced by theater incubator SoftFocus. Directed by Knud Adams, the play stars Austin Pendleton, as well as Tim Platt, Cesar J. Rosado, Claire Siebers, Laura Lassy Townsend, and Christopher Dylan White.

== Summary ==
On a university campus in New York City, professor and former playwright Ward Stein (Pendleton) leads four graduate students in a workshop on writing.

== Reception ==
The play was received positively by critics. A New York Times "Critic's Pick", The Workshop is described as "an incisive and insightful tale of ambition and envy, inspiration and mediocrity" by reviewer Elisabeth Vincentelli, who says "the show should resonate with a wide swath of theatergoers." Sarah Holdren of Vulture.com says the play's "combustion of frustration and exhilaration makes for one hell of an evening of theater." In Time Out, Helen Shaw writes, "You can tell Torrey Townsend has studied his craft... Townsend’s well-performed play is bracingly cynical."
