= Around the Sun (audio drama) =

Scripted podcast / Audio Drama

Around the Sun: An Episodic Audio Drama
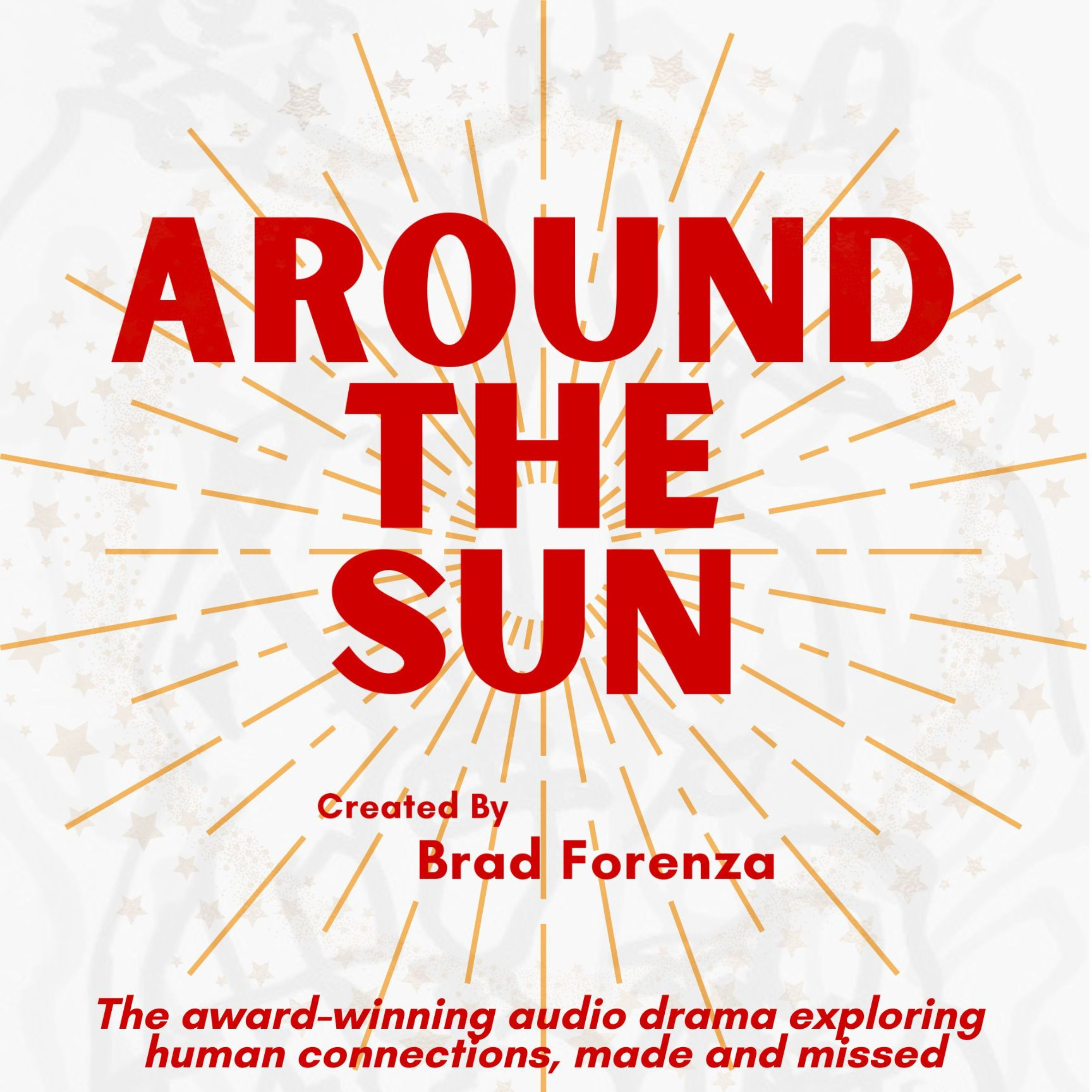
- Series-level art for Around the Sun
- Genre: Radio Play

Creative team
- Created by: Brad Forenza

Production
- Production: Best Version of Yourself, LLC
- Length: 10–15 minutes per episode

Publication
- No. of seasons: 4
- No. of episodes: 30
- Original release: October 21, 2021

Related
- Website: aroundthesunpodcast.com

Around the Sun: An Episodic Audio Drama is a scripted podcast series. Each anthology episode pairs two characters in a short scene that addresses a specific social issue. Production began during the COVID-19 pandemic in the United States.

== Production ==
Around the Sun is written and produced by Brad Forenza. The first season was co-produced by Suzanne Ordas Curry and Brian Dashew and launched via the Broadway Podcast Network in October 2021. In September 2022, Forenza and Adassa announced on NPR Illinois that a second season would premiere that autumn.

=== Season 1 (2021–22) ===
Season 1: Urban Dwellers premiered on October 21, 2021, via the Broadway Podcast Network, with episodes taking place throughout New York City. A special video version of Episode 8: "The Museum," starring Forenza and Vincent Pastore, was produced as an addendum to the season.

Season 1: Episode Guide
Episode	Title	Starring	Synopsis	Themes
101	Park Bench	Marsha Mason, Austin Pendleton	Manhattanites consider their future	marriage, retirement
102	Subway Car	Sally Struthers, Ryan Wotherspoon	Happenings on the 1 train	commitment, existential panic
103	Off-Broadway	Lilli Cooper, Veanne Cox	Fellow theatricals meet at a crossroads	friendship, ambition
104	Red Light	Dolores Catania, David LaRosa	A sex worker stays wary on a professional date	destiny, purpose
105	Upper West	David Alan Basche, Alysia Reiner	College professors discover the unexpected	parenting, thwarted plans
106	Apothecary	Christine Nagy, BD Wong	A woman explores Eastern medicine	infertility, heartache, intercultural connection
107	Wall Street	Joanna Bonaro, Maureen Van Zandt	Neighbors root for their home teams	reciprocity, coercion
108	The Museum	Brad Forenza, Vincent Pastore	A janitor confronts an uninvited guest	childhood memory, acceptance
109	Marathon	François Clemmons	A runner tackles the NYC Marathon	development, aging, life course approach
110	Be Here Now	Marsha Mason, Austin Pendleton	A cosmic reunion occurs	the afterlife, infinity

=== Season 2 (2022–23) ===
Season 2: Desert People premiered on October 26, 2022, via the Broadway Podcast Network. The season featured a new cast, with episodes unfolding in and around the American Southwest. Episodes 6 and 10 starred three-time Oscar nominee Piper Laurie in her last credited roles.

Season 2: Episode Guide
Episode	Title	Starring	Synopsis	Themes
201	Red Earth Realty	Adassa, Richard Kind	A retiree trades New York City for life in the desert	serenity, ambition
202	Fallout Girls	Caroline Aaron, Jennie Kwan	Two Earth Warriors contemplate their fate	compassion fatigue, protest
203	Area 51	Taylor Purdee, Bruce Vilanch	Military personnel have different interpretations of their oath	hierarchy, value conflicts
204	Off the Reservation	Richard Kline, Jennie Kwan	A father chases his youth at a desert music festival	empty nest syndrome, dissociation
205	Mirage	Mindy Cohn, Taylor A. Purdee	A hydroponic farm says goodbye to its first intern	youth, sustainability
206	Coyotes	Piper Laurie	A grandmother regales her grandson with natural stimuli	intergenerationality, grandparenting
207	Lonely Planet	Mindy Cohn, Bruce Vilanch	Two Trekkies ponder life beyond their convention	unrequited love, suspension of disbelief
208	After the Apocalypse	Caroline Aaron, Richard Kline	An estranged husband and wife confront each other	running away, rejection
209	Borrowed Land	Adassa, Richard Kind	A semi-retired realtor enforces her "no refunds or exchanges" policy	role reversal, balance
210	Intelligent Life	Brad Forenza, Piper Laurie	On their return trip, two aliens reflect on their visit to "miserable" planet Earth (posthumously dedicated to the memory of Piper Laurie)	perspective, the human condition

=== Season 3 (2023–24) ===
Season 3: Pinecones premiered on October 18, 2023, via the Broadway Podcast Network. The Season 3 announcement was confirmed by cast member Jai Rodriguez on WPIX television. The season features a mostly new cast with two performers (Forenza and Clemmons) returning to the project in new roles. The final episode includes an original song written by series creator Brad Forenza and interpreted by François Clemmons.

In a first for the series, Pinecones follows a single story arc, with each episode offering a different conversation between varying members of an extended family (along with members of their local community). The narrative takes place in an undisclosed mountain town in the American Northeast during the winter holiday season. It makes literal and thematic references to Frank Capra’s It’s a Wonderful Life.

Season 3: Episode Guide
Episode	Title	Starring	Synopsis	Themes
301	Prologue	Estelle Parsons	Family matriarch, Bibi, ponders a lifetime on her mountain	introspection, later life
302	Advent	Season 3 ensemble	Bibi's family angles for an unexpected holiday reunion	family dynamics, winter holidays
303	Cold Snap	Wilson Jermaine Heredia, Jai Rodriguez	Andrew and Kyle face two different kinds of tundra	family planning, grief
304	Snow Bunnies	Judy Gold, Terry Hu	Will divine intervention reach the Snow Bunny Skate before Paula and Jay?	hormones, adolescence, menopause
305	Xmas Past	Robert Funaro, Cady McClain	Childhood friends, Grace and Max, strive to see each other in a new light	first loves, functional substance abuse
306	Blue Squares	Season 3 ensemble	The Pinecone family says goodbye to Bibi	expectations, closure
307	Mountaintop	François Clemmons, Brad Forenza, Estelle Parsons	Spike catches his bus to enlightenment, with natural memories in tow	personal growth, metamorphosis

=== Season 4 (2024) ===
In 2024, a series epilogue (Artists Within) was announced via a documentary-style profile of its voice actors. All three epilogue cast members identify as writer-performers and/or theater-makers and all have been recognized by the Drama Desk Awards. Epilogue episodes are set amidst the constellations, addressing the expanses of the universe.

Season 4: Episode Guide
Episode	Title	Starring	Synopsis	Themes
401	Eternal Flames	Gretchen Cryer, Joe Gilford	Andromeda the Maiden wants to connect with Perseus	monogamy, eternity
402	Sister Stars	Gretchen Cryer, Sarah Saltzberg	Sister stars in Orion's Belt work to change their lot in life	patriarchy, liberation
403	Gods and Demigods	Joe Gilford, Sarah Saltzberg	Zeus wants the Mirror Ball, but Hermes needs a break	artistic success vs. commercial success

== Reception ==
Since its initial debut, Around the Sun has become an award-winning drama, receiving both international film festival and internet entertainment honors. These include:

- Two Cutting Room International Film Festival awards (Best Scripted Podcast/Audio Drama for Brad Forenza, 2021; Best Scripted Podcast Ensemble, 2021)
- Five Indie Series Awards nominations and one win (Best Actress: Audio Fiction for Mindy Cohn, 2023)
- Four Venus on Broadway International Film Festival Awards (Best Scripted Podcast for Brad Forenza, 2024 and 2025; Best Podcast Ensemble, 2024 and 2025)
