= Gretchen Cryer =

American playwright

- Born: Gretchen Kiger; October 17, 1935 (age 90); Dunreith, Indiana, U.S.
- Education: DePauw University
- Occupations: Playwright; lyricist; actress
- Years active: 1967–1987
- Spouse: David Cryer (m. 1958; div. 1971)
- Children: 3, including Jon Cryer

Gretchen Cryer (née Kiger; born October 17, 1935) is an American playwright, lyricist, and actress. Along with Nancy Ford, she created several successful stage musicals, including Shelter, I'm Getting My Act Together and Taking It on the Road, and The Last Sweet Days of Isaac.

== Early life ==
Cryer was born Gretchen Kiger in Dunreith, Indiana, the daughter of Louise Geraldine (née Niven; 1911–1991) and Earl William "Bill" Kiger Jr. (1911–2004), who sold school supplies and ran a home printing business. Cryer attended DePauw University as an English major.

== Career ==
In one of her music classes, she met Nancy Ford, and the two forged a friendship that eventually led to a number of professional collaborations as the first female composer-lyricist team in Off-Broadway and Broadway New York theater. Their first work, For Reasons of Royalty, was produced at DePauw University and their musical Rendezvous was done at Boston University.

Their first professional New York production was Now Is The Time For All Good Men (1967), a highly political piece about Cryer's pacifist brother, who spent time as a teacher in a conservative mid-western high school, that was panned by the critics. Using the pseudonym Sally Niven (Niven is her mother's maiden name), Cryer played the leading role in Now Is the Time... opposite her real-life husband, David. Dagne Crane had originally been cast in the part, but left shortly before the opening to become a regular on the soap opera As the World Turns.

The duo then mounted The Last Sweet Days of Isaac – with Austin Pendleton and Fredricka Weber – in 1970 at the off-Broadway Eastside Playhouse. A robust rock musical about a young musician who feels himself to be on the verge of death and so begins living life to the fullest, the musical received critical acclaim, and went on to win the Obie, Drama Desk, and Outer Critics Circle Awards.

From there they moved to Broadway in 1973 with the musical Shelter at the John Golden Theatre directed by Austin Pendleton. Marcia Rodd was nominated for the Tony Award for Best Actress in a Musical for her role. Years later, the play was revived in an off-Broadway production in 1997 at the York Theatre, and a concert production at 54 Below in 2017, starring Cryer's son, Jon Cryer.

Cryer and Ford's most notable success was I'm Getting My Act Together and Taking It on the Road (1978), based on Cryer's life experiences. She not only co-wrote the piece, but performed in it as well. Despite a cool reception from the critics, the show began to find an audience via word-of-mouth, and producer Joseph Papp moved it from his Public Theater in lower Manhattan to the Circle in the Square Theatre. where it ran from 12/14/1978 to 3/15/1981. The musical earned a Grammy nomination for the album, and traveled to locations around the world, performing for a year in Los Angeles and a year in Chicago, where it won the Joseph Jefferson Award, known as the Jeff Award for Best Musical in 1980.

Cryer and Ford's collaboration continued on other works. The musical Einstein and the Roosevelts premiered at DePauw University in October 2008.

Cryer appeared in the 1987 film Hiding Out as the aunt of her real-life son, Jon Cryer.

Cryer's additional work as a performer included roles on Broadway in Little Me (1962), 110 in the Shade (1963) and 1776 (1969). Recently, she appeared in two episodes of the Broadway Podcast Network's anthology Around the Sun audio drama (written by Brad Forenza) as part of 2024's Season 4: Artists Within––a metaphysical odyssey set amid the cosmos that features writer-performers in leading roles.

== Personal life ==
Cryer and her husband, actor/singer David Cryer, divorced in 1971. She has two daughters – Robin, who has appeared with her in cabaret shows, and Shelley, who is a theatrical make-up artist. Her son is film and television actor Jon Cryer.

Cryer is a member of Kappa Kappa Gamma.
