= Jon Cryer =

American actor (born 1965)

- Cryer in 2026
- Born: Jonathan Niven Cryer; April 16, 1965 (age 61); New York City, U.S.
- Occupation: Actor
- Years active: 1982–present
- Spouses: Sarah Trigger (m. 1999; div. 2004); Lisa Joyner (m. 2007)
- Children: 2
- Parents: Gretchen Kiger; David Cryer

Jonathan Niven Cryer (born April 16, 1965) is an American actor. Born into a show business family, he made his film debut with a lead role in No Small Affair (1984); his breakout role was as Duckie in the John Hughes-written film Pretty in Pink (1986). Cryer then had lead roles in the films Morgan Stewart's Coming Home (1987) and Hiding Out (1987), starring roles in Superman IV: The Quest for Peace (1987) and Hot Shots! (1991), and the lead role of Teddy Zakalokis on the CBS sitcom The Famous Teddy Z (1989–1990).

In the late 1990s and 2000s, Cryer transitioned to television, with main roles as Bob on the Fox sitcom Partners (1995–1996), Sam Wagner on the Fox sitcom Getting Personal (1998), and Zack Mango on the ABC sitcom The Trouble with Normal (2000–2001). He also starred in the film Holy Man (1998), and wrote, produced, and starred in the independent film Went to Coney Island on a Mission from God... Be Back by Five (1998).

Cryer experienced a career resurgence when he was cast in a co-leading role as Alan Harper on the CBS sitcom Two and a Half Men (2003–2015), for which he won two Primetime Emmy Awards; Outstanding Supporting Actor in a Comedy Series in 2009 and Outstanding Lead Actor in a Comedy Series in 2012. He received a star on the Hollywood Walk of Fame for Television in 2011. Cryer also starred in the fantasy film Shorts (2009).

Post-Two and a Half Men, Cryer portrayed Lex Luthor on the CW television series Supergirl (2019–2021) and multiple other DC Comics-related shows. He had a lead role as Jim Kearney on the NBC sitcom Extended Family (2023–2024), and starred in the coming-of-age film Big Time Adolescence (2019).

== Early life ==
Jonathan Niven Cryer was born on April 16, 1965 in New York City. His mother, Gretchen Cryer (née Kiger), is a playwright, songwriter, actress and singer. His father, Donald David Cryer, is an actor and singer who originally studied to be a minister. His paternal grandfather, the Rev. Donald Walter Cryer, was a prominent Methodist minister. He has two sisters, Robin and Shelly.

When Cryer was twelve years old, he decided he wanted to become an actor. When his mother heard this, she thought he should have a backup plan, and joked, "Plumbing is a pretty good career." Cryer attended Stagedoor Manor Performing Arts Training Center for several summers as a teenager, and is a 1983 graduate of the Bronx High School of Science. He was classmates with screenwriter and film director Boaz Yakin. To his mother's "great disappointment," he skipped college and went to the Royal Academy of Dramatic Art in London, England, for a summer short course in Shakespeare.

== Career ==
=== Career beginnings ===
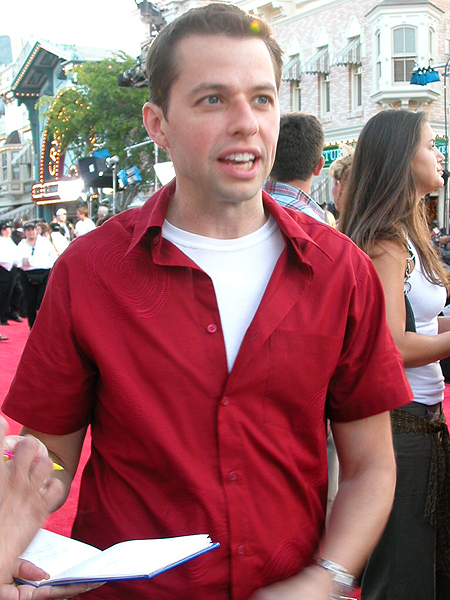
Cryer at the 2003 premiere of Pirates of the Caribbean: The Curse of the Black Pearl

Cryer's first professional acting effort was as David in the Broadway play Torch Song Trilogy, replacing Matthew Broderick, whom he "closely resembled." He reprised the role in San Francisco and Los Angeles. He was later a standby and replacement for Broderick as Eugene Jerome in the original Broadway production of Neil Simon's Brighton Beach Memoirs in 1984.

At age 19, Cryer appeared in the 1984 romantic comedy film No Small Affair, in the lead role as Charles Cummings, after the original production with Matthew Broderick was shut down when director Martin Ritt suffered a heart attack. He went on to appear in small roles in films and television films.

Cryer made his film breakthrough as Philip F. "Duckie" Dale in the John Hughes-scripted film Pretty in Pink. In an interview with the Daily News, Cryer's mother Gretchen said that after Pretty in Pink, she started getting calls from teenage girls from all over the world, who would leave hysterical, giggling messages on her answering machine.

Cryer then starred in the 1987 film Hiding Out as a stockbroker on the run from a Mafia hit man. His mother Gretchen played his aunt. The film broke even, but Cryer's performance as a character who was much older than him was critically acclaimed. In the same year, he played Lenny Luthor, nephew of supervillain Lex Luthor, in the film Superman IV: The Quest for Peace. In 1989, he got the lead role in the TV comedy series The Famous Teddy Z. His performance gained poor reviews and the show was canceled after the first season.

In 1990, Cryer appeared as Sandy in an Off-Broadway adaptation of Carnal Knowledge. That same year he appeared alongside future Two and a Half Men costar Charlie Sheen in the Jim Abrahams comedy Hot Shots!, which was received very positively. Cryer is frequently linked to the Brat Pack. In a March 2009 interview on Anytime with Bob Kushell, Cryer stated that he had auditioned for St. Elmo's Fire but was not cast in a role. In 1993, he was asked to audition for the role of Chandler Bing on Friends, while doing a play in London. His reading was videotaped by a British casting agent but the tape failed to arrive in the U.S. before the network had made its final decision.

In 1995, Cryer was cast as Bob in the sitcom Partners, which, like his prior show The Famous Teddy Z, was canceled after its first season. In an interview with Time Out New York he stated, "Hey, every show I'm in goes down. Think about this: George Clooney was in 28 pilots, or something. It means nothing." After guest starring on shows such as Dharma & Greg and The Outer Limits, he wrote, produced and co-starred in the film Went to Coney Island on a Mission from God... Be Back by Five. It debuted in 1998 at the Los Angeles Film Festival and gained positive reviews from critics. Leonard Maltin from Playboy Magazine called it "a breath of fresh air." That same year, Cryer landed in another TV series, the Fox sitcom Getting Personal, alongside Vivica A. Fox and Duane Martin. Although the show was picked up for a second season after its abbreviated spring run, it was canceled that fall, after airing 17 episodes in total.

In 1999, Cryer appeared as Neal in Jeffrey Sweet's play Bluff at the Victory Gardens Theater. In 2000, he was cast as the lead in a comedy series called The Trouble with Normal. For the third time, Cryer starred in a show which was canceled after its first season.

=== Two and a Half Men ===
Cryer's long run of unsuccessful TV projects finally ended in 2003. Against the wishes of CBS executives (who were aware of his past failures) and due to a friendship with Charlie Sheen, he was cast as Alan Harper on the hit comedy series Two and a Half Men. (He had auditioned for the role of Gaius Baltar on the Sci-Fi Channel's reimagined Battlestar Galactica at around the same time, but the role went to James Callis.) Cryer earned seven Primetime Emmy Awards nominations and two wins for his acting work on the show. In a comment on the show's high ratings, he said: "When you're on a show that's fighting for survival every week, you stop trusting your instincts, because you think, 'My instincts haven't worked so far.' But when people clearly like the show and are watching it in great numbers, it takes a huge amount of pressure off you. It allows you to trust your instincts and go with what has worked for you before."

After Sheen's departure from the series, Cryer's character became the show's protagonist (with Ashton Kutcher being cast as the co-lead) during the final four seasons. Cryer is the only actor to have appeared in every episode of the series; Sheen was fired in March 2011 and Cryer's on-screen son Angus T. Jones left the series at the end of season 10.

=== Further acting and TV roles ===
In 2008, Cryer appeared with Laurence Fishburne and James Cromwell in the film Tortured, and in 2009 co-starred with James Spader in the film Shorts.

In 2011, Cryer played the role of David in a concert staging of Stephen Sondheim's musical Company with the New York Philharmonic at Lincoln Center. The all-star cast was headed by Neil Patrick Harris and Patti LuPone. The concert subsequently aired on PBS's Great Performances.

Cryer made a guest appearance on the sitcom series Husbands in its second season. He was initially cast to voice the lead character in DisneyToon Studios' animated film Planes, a spin-off of Pixar's Cars franchise, but later dropped out and was replaced by Dane Cook. Cryer did however receive a credit on the film for "additional story material."

In 2015, Cryer released a memoir, So That Happened, a breezy, often comic tale chronicling Cryer's 30-year career on stage, film and television.

Cryer appeared in the drama series NCIS, where he played Navy Dr. Cyril Taft who treats NCIS Special Agent Leroy Jethro Gibbs (Mark Harmon). Cryer had expressed a desire to appear in NCIS since it premiered in 2003.

Pursuing a passion for criminal justice, Cryer joined the team of the popular podcast Undisclosed where he will be voicing the weekly addendum episode for the second season. After appearing on the podcast Crime Writers On... it was announced that he would join the Undisclosed podcast for their second season.

On May 21, 2018, Cryer was featured in the season 9 premiere of genealogy program Who Do You Think You Are? Cryer uncovered the dramatic tale of his ancestor James Adams, a Scottish Covenanter soldier who was captured during the Battle of Dunbar in 1650, and endured horrific conditions as a prisoner. He was then transported to America an indentured servant to work at the Saugus Iron Works at Lynn, Massachusetts. As part of his research for the episode, Cryer visited the site of the Battle of Dunbar, Durham Cathedral in Durham, North East England – where surviving Scottish prisoners were held until they were indentured – and the Saugus Iron Works national historic site. Cryer said: "Seeing the resilience of my family over centuries, you can see the legacy he left. I can't help but feel lucky...clearly, the resilience of my family, that spine of steel, was not something that came from nowhere. Moving forward, I'm going to take James Adams' strength as my inspiration and know that when you go through very, very difficult times, if you can turn around and help the people around you who had it even worse, that's real strength. And I aspire to be one of those people."

On November 16, 2018, it was announced that Cryer had been cast as Lex Luthor on The CW's Supergirl in a recurring role. (He had previously played Lenny Luthor, Lex Luthor's nephew, in the 1987 film Superman IV: The Quest for Peace.) His first appearance in the fifteenth episode of Season 4, titled "O Brother, Where Art Thou?". He reprised the role in the Batwoman and The Flash episodes of the Arrowverse crossover Crisis on Infinite Earths.

On April 15, 2019, Cryer joined other WGA writers in firing their agents as part of the WGA's stand against the ATA and the practice of packaging.

== Personal life ==
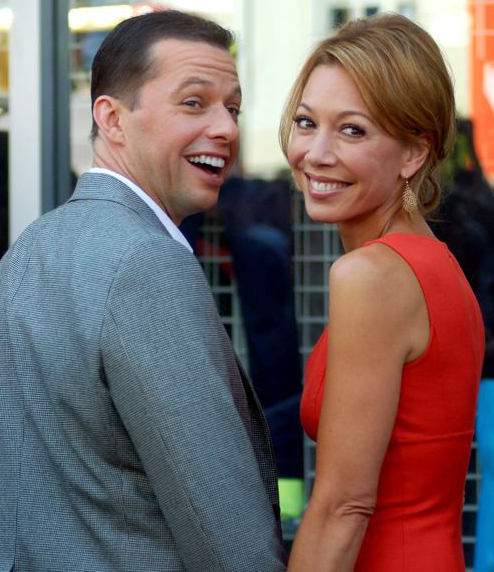
Cryer with wife Lisa Joyner in September 2011

In 1999 Cryer married British actress Sarah Trigger, and they had a son named Charlie Austin. They divorced in 2004. On a February 2007 episode of The Tonight Show with Jay Leno, Cryer announced he was engaged to entertainment reporter Lisa Joyner. They married in Mexico in June 2007. On September 29, 2009, they announced the adoption of a baby girl.

Cryer adheres to the Methodist faith of his upbringing.

When Pretty in Pink co-star Molly Ringwald told Out magazine in 2012 that she believed Cryer's character in the film, Duckie, was gay, Cryer stated, "I respectfully disagree. I want to stand up for all the slightly effeminate dorks that are actually heterosexual. Just 'cause the gaydar is going off, doesn't mean your instruments aren't faulty. I've had to live with that, and that's OK." Also in 2012, he told Jeff Probst that when he and Joyner started dating, she wondered if he might be gay because "he never kissed me." Cryer was asked in 2014 if he was "mistaken for gay"; he called himself "an effeminate heterosexual dork" and made a tongue-in-cheek remark about never being propositioned: "Fellas, you're dropping the ball."

Cryer has a niece named Gracie, who appeared on the third season of Claim to Fame.

=== Political views ===
Prior to the 2008 presidential election, Cryer attended a fundraiser hosted by the McCain campaign and, according to news reports, endorsed John McCain. When Cryer did not make a public endorsement for the 2012 election, Cryer's spokesperson said the 2008 report aligning him with the Republican Party was a "mistake" and that Cryer was "not really political." Cryer had attended events for both Republicans and Democrats "because he wanted to hear what both sides had to say."

In regard to Donald Trump, Cryer opined on the May 5, 2016, episode of the podcast Never Not Funny that "Donald Trump is the Charlie Sheen of politics," comparing Sheen's drug addiction to a perceived Trump "addict[ion] to feeling important".

Cryer was an active supporter of the 2023 Writers Guild of America strike and also a supporter of the 2023 SAG-AFTRA strike.

In 2025, he was spotted in the background of a photograph detailing the No Kings protests. He expressed his support for the movement and said "This photo is what The Atlantic chose to illustrate resistance cringe, and I couldn’t be happier to be a part of it."

== Filmography ==
=== Film ===
Year	Title	Role	Notes
1984	No Small Affair	Charles Cummings	
1985	Noon Wine	Teenage Herbert Thompson	
1985	O.C. and Stiggs	Randall Schwab Jr.	
1986	Pretty in Pink	Phil "Duckie" Dale	
1987	Morgan Stewart's Coming Home	Morgan Stewart	
1987	Superman IV: The Quest for Peace	Lenny Luthor	
1987	Dudes	Grant	
1987	Hiding Out	Andrew Morenski/Max Hauser	
1989	Penn & Teller Get Killed	Frat Boy	
1991	Hot Shots!	Jim "Wash Out" Pfaffenbach	
1993	The Waiter	Tommy Kazdan	
1994	Heads	Guy Franklin	
1996	The Pompatus of Love	Mark	Also writer
1996	Cannes Man	Himself	
1997	Plan B	Stuart Winer	
1998	Went to Coney Island on a Mission from God... Be Back by Five	Daniel	Also writer and producer
1998	Holy Man	Barry	
2001	Glam	Jimmy Pells	
2003	The Metro Chase	Mr. Stamm	
2008	Unstable Fables: 3 Pigs and a Baby	Richard Pig	Voice
2008	Tortured	Brian Mark	
2009	Weather Girl	Charles	
2009	Shorts: The Adventures of the Wishing Rock	Bill Thompson	
2009	Stay Cool	Javier	
2010	Due Date	Alan Harper	Cameo
2011	Company	David	Filmed performance
2013	Ass Backwards	Dean Morris	
2013	Planes	—N/a	Additional story material
2014	Hit by Lightning	Ricky Miller	
2019	Big Time Adolescence	Reuben Harris	
2021	18½	H. R. Haldeman	Voice
2024	Brats	Himself	Documentary

=== Television ===
Year	Title	Role	Notes
1986	Amazing Stories	Phil	Episode: "Miscalculation"
1988	Cinemax Comedy Experiment	Himself	Episode: "Rap Master Ronnie: A Report Card"
1989–1990	The Famous Teddy Z	Teddy Zakalokis	20 episodes
1995–1996	Partners	Bob	22 episodes
1996	The Outer Limits	Trevor McPhee	Episode: "Vanishing Act"
1997	It's Good to Be King	Mort	
1997	Dharma & Greg	Brian	Episode: "Shower the People You Love with Love"
1998	Getting Personal	Sam Wagner	17 episodes (also producer)
1998	Hercules	The Winged Wolves	Voice, episode: "Hercules and the Underworld Takeover"
1998	Mr. Show with Bob and David	Duckie	Episode: "It's Perfectly Understandishable"
1998	Two Guys, a Girl and a Pizza Place	Justin	Episode: "Two Guys, a Girl and a Thanksgiving"
2000–2001	The Trouble with Normal	Zack Mango	13 episodes
2000	Family Guy	Wiseguy	Voice, episode: "There's Something About Paulie"
2002	Andy Richter Controls the Universe	Lemuel Praeger	Episode: "Gimme a C"
2002	The Practice	Terry Pender	Episode: "Of Thee I Sing"
2003	Becker	Roger	Episode: "Chris' Ex"
2003	Hey Joel	Joel Stein	Voice, 13 episodes
2003	Stripperella	Dave / Clifton / Clifford	Voice, 3 episodes
2003–2015	Two and a Half Men	Alan Harper	262 episodes
2005–2006	Danny Phantom	Freakshow	Voice, 2 episodes
2006	American Dad!	Quacky	Voice, episode: "It's Good to Be The Queen"
2008	CSI: Crime Scene Investigation	Himself	Episode: "Two and a Half Deaths"
2010–2011	Hannah Montana	Kenneth Truscott	2 episodes
2012	Husbands	Vic Del Rey	2 episodes
2013	The Cleveland Show	Alan Harper	Voice, episode: "The Fist and the Furious"
2013–2016	Mom	Restaurant customer	Episode: "Pilot"; 2 episodes (director)
2015–2016	NCIS	Dr. Cyril Taft	3 episodes
2016–2017	The Ranch	Bill Jensen	2 episodes
2016	Lady Dynamite	Himself	Episode: "Pilot"
2017–2019	Ryan Hansen Solves Crimes on Television	Jon Cryer	7 episodes
2017	Justice League Action	Felix Faust	Voice, 4 episodes
2017	Disjointed	—N/a	2 episodes (director)
2018	Robot Chicken	Brainy Smurf / Ziggy	Voice, episode: "Your Mouth Is Hanging off Your Face"
2018	Will & Grace	Himself	Episode: "Kid 'n Play"
2018	Drop the Mic	Himself	Episode: "Shawn Mendes vs. Odell Beckham Jr. & Molly Ringwald vs. Jon Cryer"
2018	Who Do You Think You Are?	Himself	2 episodes
2019–2021	Supergirl	Lex Luthor (Earth-38)	20 episodes
2019	Batwoman	Lex Luthor (Earth-38)	Episode: "Crisis on Infinite Earths: Part 2"
2019	The Flash	Lex Luthor (Earth-38)	Episode: "Crisis on Infinite Earths: Part 3"
2020	Arrow	Lex Luthor (Earth-38)	Episode: "Crisis on Infinite Earths: Part 4"
2020	Legends of Tomorrow	Lex Luthor (Earth-38)	Episode: "Crisis on Infinite Earths: Part 5"
2020	The Forgotten West Memphis Three	—N/a	Television mini-series documentary (executive producer)
2021	The Kominsky Method	Himself	Episode: "Chapter 22. The fundamental things apply"
2023–2024	Extended Family	Jim Kearney	13 episodes (executive producer)
2026	Stuart Fails to Save the Universe	Sherpa	Episode: "Stuart Makes a Wallet"

== Theatre ==
Year	Title	Role	Venue	Ref.
1983	Torch Song Trilogy	David	US national tour	
1983	Brighton Beach Memoirs	Eugene Jerome	Alvin Theatre	
1990	Carnal Knowledge	Sandy	Kaufman Theater	
1994	900 Oneonta	Gitlo	The Old Vic	
1999	Bluff	Neal	Victory Gardens Theater	
2011	Company	David	Concert with the New York Philharmonic at Lincoln Center	
2026	The 25th Annual Putnam County Spelling Bee	Vice Principal Douglas Panch	New World Stages	

== Book ==
- So That Happened: A Memoir (2015) - Berkley – ISBN 0-45-147235-7.
