= Austin Pendleton =

American actor (born 1940)

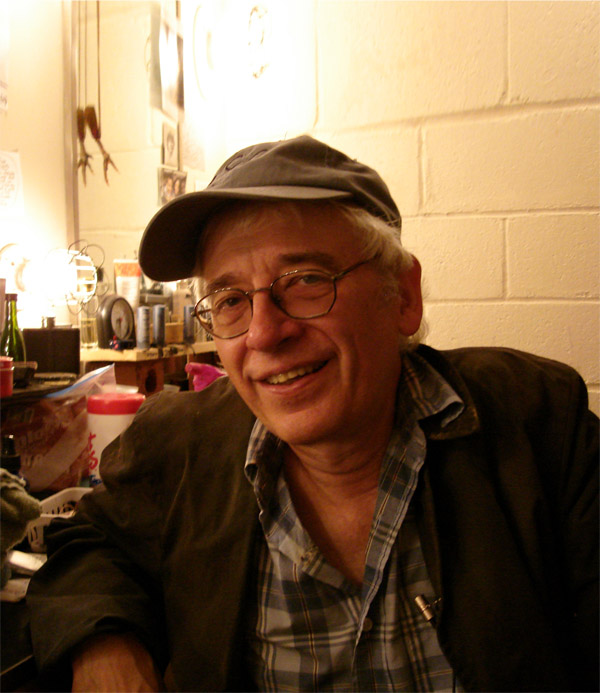
- Pendleton in 2006
- Born: Austin Campbell Pendleton; March 27, 1940 (age 86); Warren, Ohio, U.S.
- Education: Yale University, 1961
- Occupations: Actor; playwright; theatre director
- Years active: 1962–present
- Spouse: Katina Commings (m. 1970)
- Children: 1

Austin Campbell Pendleton (born March 27, 1940) is an American actor, playwright, and theatre director.

Pendleton is known as a prolific character actor on the stage and screen, whose six-decade career has included roles in films including Catch-22 (1970); What's Up, Doc? (1972); The Front Page (1974); The Muppet Movie (1979), Short Circuit (1986); Mr. & Mrs. Bridge (1990); My Cousin Vinny (1992); Mr. Nanny (1993); Guarding Tess (1994); Amistad (1997); A Beautiful Mind (2001), which earned him a Screen Actors Guild Award for Outstanding Performance by a Cast in a Motion Picture nomination; and Finding Nemo (2003).

Pendleton received a Tony Award nomination for Best Direction of a Play for the Broadway revival of The Little Foxes in 1981, starring Elizabeth Taylor. He received Obie and Drama Desk Awards for Outstanding Performance in The Last Sweet Days of Isaac in 1970, and an additional Special Drama Desk Award for being a "Renaissance Man of the American Theatre" in 2007. He received an additional Obie Award for directing the Off-Broadway revival of Three Sisters in 2011.

Pendleton's recent Broadway credits include acting in Choir Boy in 2016 and The Minutes in 2022, and directing Between Riverside and Crazy, also in 2022.

== Early life and education ==
Pendleton was born in Warren, Ohio, the son of Thorn Pendleton, who ran a tool company, and Frances (née Manchester) Pendleton, a professional actress. He graduated from the University School, a private all-boys school in Shaker Heights, Ohio, in 1957. Roger Ailes, who became the CEO of Fox News, was a childhood acquaintance of Pendleton in Warren, Ohio. Ailes took acting classes taught by Pendleton's mother.

Pendleton became interested in the theater through his mother, whose performances he watched when he was young. In junior high school, he put on his own performances in the basement of the family home. He participated in theater while attending Yale University, from which he graduated in 1961. He was a member of the Yale Dramatic Association, and in 1958 collaborated with lyricist Peter Bergman on two musical plays that starred Philip Proctor: Tom Jones and Booth Is Back In Town. Proctor and Bergman later formed half of The Firesign Theatre comedy group.

== Career ==
After Yale, Pendleton moved to New York City and studied at HB Studio. He broke into the theater performing in the 1962 off-Broadway production of Oh Dad, Poor Dad, Mama's Hung You in the Closet and I'm Feelin' So Sad, directed by Jerome Robbins.

Robbins directed Fiddler on the Roof when it came to Broadway in 1964, and brought Pendleton into the opening-night cast, performing the role of Motel the tailor. Pendleton went on to appear in The Last Sweet Days of Isaac (for which he won the Drama Desk Award for Outstanding Performance and an Obie Award), The Diary of Anne Frank, Goodtime Charley, and Up from Paradise, and many other plays. In August 2006, he played the Chaplain in the New York Shakespeare Festival/Public Theater production of Bertolt Brecht's Mother Courage and Her Children directed by George C. Wolfe at the Delacorte Theater. In 2007, he appeared as Friar Lawrence in The Public Theater's production of Shakespeare's Romeo and Juliet at the Delacorte.

Pendleton wrote the plays Uncle Bob, Booth, and Orson's Shadow, all of which were staged off-Broadway. Uncle Bob had its off-Broadway premiere in 2001 at The SoHo Playhouse, starring George Morfogen—for whom the role of Bob was written—and Gale Harold who was later replaced by Joseph Gordon-Levitt, both making their New York theatre debuts. The critically acclaimed production was directed by Courtney Moorehead and produced by Steven Sendor. As a director, Pendleton has worked extensively on and off Broadway. His direction of Elizabeth Taylor and Maureen Stapleton in Lillian Hellman's The Little Foxes garnered him a Tony Award nomination in 1981. Additional directing credits include The Runner Stumbles by Milan Stitt (1977), Spoils of War by Michael Weller (1988), and The Size of the World by Charles Evered (1996).

Pendleton is also a member of The Mirror Theater Ltd's Mirror Repertory Company, directing the company's 1984 production of Henrik Ibsen's Ghosts, starring Geraldine Page, Sabra Jones, and Victor Slezak. His play H6R3, a compilation of Henry VI and Richard III intended to make the story line clearer and strengthen the women's parts, became a benefit production of The Mirror Theater Ltd at the then Promenade Theater in New York. Pendleton played Richard in this performance, Sabra Jones performed Elizabeth, Lynn Redgrave played Mad Margaret, Charles McAteer was Lord Rutland, Geraint Wyn Davies played Henry VI, Daniel Gerroll played Buckingham, and Lisa Pelikan played Lady Anne.

In 2009, Pendleton directed Uncle Vanya, starring Maggie Gyllenhaal and Peter Sarsgaard, at the Classic Stage Company. The same year he directed Tennessee Williams's Vieux Carré at The Pearl Theatre Company. In 2010, Pendleton directed two plays, Bus Stop at the Olney Theater and Golden Age at the Philadelphia Theatre Company. His 2011 directing of Three Sisters won him an Obie Award. In 2012, he directed a production of Detroit at the National Theatre in London.

Pendleton served as artistic director of the Circle Repertory Company with associate artistic director Lynne Thigpen. The company closed in 1996. He has taught acting at HB Studio since 1969, and teaches directing at The New School. Pendleton has been involved with Chicago's Steppenwolf Theatre since directing Ralph Pape's Say Goodnight, Gracie for the 1979–80 season, and is an ensemble member there. His acting credits at Steppenwolf include Uncle Vanya, Valparaiso, and Educating Rita.

In 2022, Pendleton reminisced that he was initially reluctant to join Steppenwolf, as the name bothered him and he was reluctant to move to Chicago. "But he ended up taking the gig and started auditioning the troupe—twelve relative unknowns. 'For one role, I had to choose between Laurie Metcalf and Joan Allen,' he said. A second role went to a guy named John Malkovich."

Pendleton was the subject of Starring Austin Pendleton, a 2016 documentary in which colleagues including Meryl Streep, Philip Seymour Hoffman, Maggie Gyllenhaal, Olympia Dukakis, and Ethan Hawke discuss his life and legacy.

As a member of the Steppenwolf Theatre Company, Pendleton starred in Tracy Letts's play The Minutes on Broadway.

In the fall of 2022, Pendleton directed a Broadway production of Between Riverside and Crazy, which he directed Off Broadway in 2014.

== Personal life ==
Pendleton has been married to actress Katina Commings since November 1970. They have one child.

== Theatre ==
Year	Stage	Role	Notes
1962	Oh Dad, Poor Dad, Mama's Hung You in the Closet and I'm Feelin' So Sad	Jonathan	Off-Broadway
1964	Fiddler on the Roof	Motel	Broadway
1966	Hail Scrawdyke!	Irwin Ingham	Broadway
1967	The Little Foxes	Leo Hubbard	Broadway
1970	The Last Sweet Days of Isaac	Isaac	Off-Broadway
1973	Shelter		Director; Broadway
1974	An American Millionaire	Professor Bobby Rudetsky	Broadway
1975	Goodtime Charley	Charley (standby)	Broadway
1976	The Sorrows of Frederick	Frederick II of Prussia	Off-Broadway
1976	The Runner Stumbles		Director; Broadway
1976	The Old Glory		Director; off-Broadway
1978	Say Goodnight Gracie		Director; off-Broadway
1979	The Office Murders	Jack	Off-Broadway
1980	John Gabriel Borkman		Director; Broadway
1981	The Little Foxes		Director; Broadway
1983	Up from Paradise	Adam	Off-Broadway
1985	Doubles	Arnie	Broadway
1986	Master Class	Shostakovich	Off-Broadway
1987	Educating Rita	Frank	Off-Broadway
1987	Uncle Vanya	Voitski	Off-Broadway
1988	Spoils of War		Director; Broadway
1989	Grand Hotel	Otto Kringelein	Replacement; Broadway
1991	The Sorrows of Frederick	Frederick the Great	Off-Broadway
1991	What About Luv?	Harry Berlin	Off-Broadway
1993	Sophistry	Whitey McCoy	Off-Broadway
1996	The Size of the World		Director; off-Broadway
1996	900 Oneonta		Director; off-Broadway
1997	The Diary of Anne Frank	Mr. Dussel	Broadway
1998	The Pussycat and the Expert Plumber Who Was a Man	Mayor	Off-Broadway
2002	The Exonerated		Off-Broadway
2006	Mother Courage and Her Children	Chaplain	Off-Broadway
2006	an oak tree	Father	Off-Broadway
2006	The Sunset Limited	White	Off-Broadway
2007	Toys in the Attic		Director; off-Broadway
2007	Romeo and Juliet	Friar Laurence	Off-Broadway
2008	Fifty Words		Director; off-Broadway
2008	The Black Monk	The Black Monk	Off-Broadway
2009	Uncle Vanya		Director; off-Broadway
2009	Vieux Carre		Director; off-Broadway
2009	Order		Director; off-Broadway
2009	Love Drunk	Wilbur	Off-Broadway
2010	Rosmersholm	Doctor Kroll	Off-Broadway
2011	Three Sisters		Director; off-Broadway
2012	Detroit		Director; off-Broadway
2012	Ivanov	Lebedev	Also director; off-Broadway
2012	In Masks Outrageous and Austere	Dr. Lester G. Syme	Off-Broadway
2013	Choir Boy	Mr. Pendleton	Off-Broadway
2014	Between Riverside and Crazy		Director; off-Broadway
2014	Straight White Men	Ed	Off-Broadway
2017	Workshop	Ward Stein	Off-Broadway
2018	Wars of the Roses: Henry VI & Richard III	Henry VI	Also director; off-Broadway
2018	Choir Boy	Mr. Pendleton	Broadway
2018	The Magic of Too Late		Director; off-Broadway
2019	Life Sucks.	The Professor	Off-Broadway
2020	The Minutes	Mr. Oldfield	Broadway
2022	The Minutes	Mr. Oldfield	Broadway
2022	Between Riverside and Crazy		Director; Broadway

== Filmography ==
=== Film ===
Year	Title	Role	Notes
1968	Petulia	Intern	
1968	Skidoo	Fred	
1970	Catch-22	Lieutenant Colonel Moodus	
1972	What's Up, Doc?	Frederick Larrabee	
1972	Every Little Crook and Nanny	Luther	
1973	The Thief Who Came to Dinner	Zukovsky	
1974	The Front Page	Earl Williams	
1976	Diary of the Dead	Dr. Klein	
1977	The Great Smokey Roadblock	Guido	
1979	The Muppet Movie	Max	
1979	Starting Over	Paul	
1980	Simon	Dr. Carl Becker	
1980	First Family	Dr. Alexander Grade	
1984	Talk to Me	Richard Patterson	
1985	My Man Adam	Mr. Greenhut	
1986	Off Beat	Gun Shop Salesman	
1986	Highlander	Hospital scene	uncredited
1986	Short Circuit	Howard Marner	
1987	Hello Again	Junior Lacey	
1990	Mr. & Mrs. Bridge	Mr. Gadbury	
1991	The Ballad of the Sad Café	Lawyer Taylor	
1991	True Identity	Othello's Director	
1992	My Cousin Vinny	John Gibbons	
1992	Rain Without Thunder	Catholic Priest	
1992	Charlie's Ear	Harold Blodgett	
1992	Do You Like Women?	Unknown	
1993	Mr. Nanny	Alex Mason Sr.	
1993	My Boyfriend's Back	Dr. Bronson	
1993	Searching for Bobby Fischer	Asa Hoffmann	
1994	Greedy	Hotel Clerk	
1994	Guarding Tess	Earl Fowler	
1995	Home for the Holidays	Peter Arnold	
1995	Two Much	Dr. Huffeyer	
1995	The Fifteen Minute Hamlet	Hamlet	Short
1996	Sgt. Bilko	Major Ebersole	
1996	2 Days in the Valley	Ralph Crupi	
1996	The Proprietor	Willy Kunst	
1996	The Associate	Aesop Franklin	
1996	The Mirror Has Two Faces	Barry	
1997	Trial and Error	Judge Paul Z. Graff	
1997	Sue Lost in Manhattan	Bob	
1997	Amistad	Professor Gibbs	
1997	The Fanatics	Eugene Cleft	
1997	A River Made to Drown In	Billy	
1998	Charlie Hoboken	Harry Cedars	
1999	Skirty Winner	François Truffaut	
1999	Joe the King	Winston	
1999	Men of Means	Jerry Trask	
1999	The 4th Floor	Mr. Collins	
1999	Brokendown Love Story	'Lucky'	Short
2000	The Acting Class	Bobby Austin	
2000	Broke Even	Archie	
2000	Fast Food Fast Women	George	
2000	The Summer of My Deflowering	Unknown	Short
2000	Clowns	Dean	
2001	Queenie in Love	Alvin	
2001	A Beautiful Mind	Thomas King	
2001	Wishcraft	Mr. Turner	
2002	Manna from Heaven	Two-Digit Doyle	
2003	Finding Nemo	Gurgle	Voice
2003	Uptown Girls	Mr. McConkey	
2004	Christmas with the Kranks	Marty	
2004	Piccadilly Jim	Peter Pett	
2005	The Civilization of Maxwell Bright	Jaurice	
2005	The Notorious Bettie Page	Teacher	
2006	Raising Flagg	Gus Falk	
2007	Lovely by Surprise	Jackson	
2010	Wall Street: Money Never Sleeps	Dr. Masters	
2013	He's Way More Famous Than You	Dad	
2013	Hair Brained	Dapper Man	
2013	Black Box	William Peters	
2014	She's Funny That Way	Judge Pendergast	
2014	The Mend	Earl	
2016	Starring Austin Pendleton	Himself	Documentary
2016	Finding Dory	Gurgle	Voice
2018	7 Splinters in Time	Fyodor Wax	
2018	Divide and Conquer: The Story of Roger Ailes	Himself	Documentary
2019	The Sound of Silence	Robert Feinway	
2020	The Mimic	The Driver	
2021	Our Father	Jerry Fohrman (Jazz)	
2022	5-25-77	Herb Lightman	
2025	A King's Curtain	Gregory	Short

=== Television ===
Austin Pendleton television credits
Year	Title	Role	Notes
1972	Love, American Style	Barney Dereemus	1 episode
1973	Love, American Style	Leo	1 episode
1974	Good Times	Donald Hargrove	1 episode
1974	Great Performances	Bennie	1 episode
1977	You're Gonna Love It Here	Harry Rogers	TV movie
1978	Big City Boys	Harry Buckman	TV movie
1983	Great Performances	White Rabbit	1 episode
1983–1984	St. Elsewhere	Mr. Entertainment	2 episodes
1985	Love, Long Distance	Dr. Arthur Ruskin	TV movie
1986	Miami Vice	Max Rogo	1 episode
1986–1989	The Equalizer	Jonah	3 episodes "Nightscape" (S2.E6) "Solo" (S2.E17) "The Sins of Our Fathers" (S4.E8)
1987	Leg Work	Harold Rodman	1 episode
1988	Spenser: For Hire	The Professor	1 episode
1989	The Cosby Show	Mr. Kensington	1 episode
1989	B.L. Stryker	Danny Lennox	1 episode
1989	Anything But Love	Max Templeton	1 episode
1989	One Life to Live	Mr. Dubuis	TV series
1990	American Dreamer	Unknown	1 episode
1990	21 Jump Street	Mr. Trysla	1 episode
1991	Lethal Innocence	Paul Kent	TV movie
1992	Murder, She Wrote	Barney Gunderson	Episode: "Angel of Death"
1992	Four Eyes and Six Guns	Mustached Passenger	TV movie
1994	The Cosby Mysteries	Maynard Caldwell	Episode: "One Day at a Time"
1994	Don't Drink the Water	Chef Oscar	TV movie
1995	Tales from the Crypt	Orloff	Episode: "Doctor of Horror"
1995	New York News	Unknown	Episode: "Cost of Living"
1995	Long Island Fever	Dr. Motts	TV movie
1997	Frasier	Dr. William M. Dorfman	Episode: "Three Days of the Condo"
1997	The Practice	Sam Feldberg	Episode: "Part VI"
1997	Fired Up	Bobby H.	1 episode
1997	Liberty!	Benjamin Rush	2 episodes
1998	Tracey Takes On...	Professor Kenneth Hawkins	Episode: "Age"
1998–1999	Homicide: Life on the Street	Dr. George Griscom	11 episodes
1998–2002	Oz	William Giles	11 episodes
2000	The West Wing	Barry Haskell	Episode: "Lies, Damn Lies, and Statistics"
2000	Homicide: The Movie	Dr. George Griscom	TV movie
2001	The Education of Max Bickford	Harry	1 episode
2001–2002	100 Centre Street	Al Cox	2 episodes
2002	Touched by an Angel	Mr. Piltdown	Episode: "The Christmas Watch"
2003	Law & Order: Special Victims Unit	Horace Gorman	Episode: "Control"
2004	Strip Search	James Perley	TV movie
2004	Law & Order: Criminal Intent	Dr. John Manotti	Episode: "Inert Dwarf"
2005	Joan of Arcadia	Dietrich Steinholz	Episode: "Secret Service"
2009	Life on Mars	Dr. Goldman	Episode: "Revenge of Broken Jaw"
2009	Cupid	Dr. Boyd	Episode: "Pilot"
2011	Person of Interest	Pilcher	Episode: "Foe"
2012	Game Change	Senator Joe Lieberman	HBO TV movie
2016	Billions	Goose Quill	2 episodes
2016	Difficult People	Director	Episode: "Cedar Grove"
2018	Alex, Inc.	Wesley Harman	Episode: "The Unfair Advantage"
2019	A President Show Documentary: The Fall Of Donald Trump	Historian	TV special
2020	New Amsterdam	Eli Pembroke	Episode: "Hiding Behind My Smile"
2021	The Good Fight	Dr. Goat	Episode: "And the Violence Spread."

=== Theme parks ===
Year	Title	Role	Notes
2007	Finding Nemo Submarine Voyage	Gurgle	

== Audio dramas ==
- 2021–2022: Around the Sun – Harry – 3 episodes
