= MFA =

MFA may refer to:

== Organizations ==
- Marine and Fisheries Agency, a former UK government executive agency
- Ministry of Foreign Affairs (including a list of ministries with the name)
- Movement of the Forces of the Future (French: Mouvement des Forces de l'Avenir), a political party in Côte d'Ivoire
- Armed Forces Movement (Portuguese: Movimento das Forças Armadas), the group responsible for Portugal's Carnation Revolution in 1974

=== Education ===
- Master of Fine Arts

=== Football ===
- Mumbai Football Association
- Malta Football Association
- Mauritius Football Association
- Midland Football Alliance, England
- Montserrat Football Association
- Munster Football Association, Ireland

=== United States ===
- Managed Funds Association
- Math for America
- Mercy for Animals
- MFA Oil, an energy cooperative
- Missouri Farmers Association
- Museum of Fine Arts, Boston, Massachusetts
- Museum of Fine Arts (St. Petersburg, Florida)

== Science and technology ==
- Felt-area magnitude (abbreviated as M_{fa}), a type of macroseismic magnitude scale
- Made for AdSense, a pejorative description for some websites
- Mail filtering agent
- Material flow accounting
- Material flow analysis
- Medium-functioning autism, a classification of autism
- Metabolic flux analysis
- Methylfluoroalkoxy, a perfluoro polymer
- Multi-factor authentication, a means of confirming user identity

== Transport ==
- Mafia Airport (IATA airport code), Tanzania
- Morfa Mawddach railway station (National Rail station code), Gwynedd, Wales

== Other uses ==
- M.F.A. (film) a 2017 film
- Multi Fibre Arrangement, a former system of textile export quotas
- Medicare for All, a U.S. political movement for single-payer healthcare

== See also ==
- Anthony Mfa Mezui (born 1991), a Gabonese association football player
