= VD Blues =

- Written by: Donald Fouser; Gary Belkin; Jules Feiffer
- Directed by: Israel Horovitz; Stanley Lathan
- Starring: Dick Cavett; James Coco; Marcia Rodd; Arlo Guthrie
- No. of episodes: 1

Production
- Producers: Gary Belkin; Israel Horovitz

Original release
- Network: WNET
- Release: October 9, 1972

VD Blues was a one-hour PBS Special of the Week, created by Donald Fouser that aired in 1972 about the dangers of venereal disease.

== Plot ==
The show consisted of a series of skits and sketches that were hosted by Dick Cavett and starred well-known performers such as James Coco, Marcia Rodd, and Arlo Guthrie. It was underwritten by the 3M Company. The show featured the Shel Silverstein song "Don't Give a Dose" performed by Dr. Hook & The Medicine Show.

== Sequel ==
In 1973, PBS made a sequel, VD Blues, Part 2, in which student volunteers from Drama classes at the University of Rochester in Rochester, NY were filmed in staged "candid" situations, asking key questions to be answered. An example: turning from a table of students at a seminar, one asks into the camera, "How do I know if I have V.D.?" One of the most memorable images of VD Blues, Part 2 was returning host Dick Cavett brandishing a toilet seat and stating, "You won't get VD from one of THESE!"

== Awards ==
The show won an Emmy Award in the category of "Special Classification of Outstanding Program Achievements awarded to Donald Fouser." Time Magazine called it the "most venturesome single show" of 1972.

== Book ==
A paperback book containing a transcript of the show was published by Avon Books in 1973.
