= List of The Phantom Tollbooth characters =

This is a list of characters from The Phantom Tollbooth, a 1961 children's book written by Norton Juster and illustrated by Jules Feiffer, and its different adaptations.

== Main characters ==
=== Milo ===
Milo is a school-aged boy and the main character, bored with life prior to receiving the gifts. He was a very confused boy. Milo's age is not stated. In early drafts, Juster put Milo's age at eight, then nine, before concluding that it was "not only unnecessary to be that precise but probably more prudent not to do so, lest some readers decide they were too old to care..." A very early draft has in his place a ten-year-old named Tony with his parents Mr. & Mrs. Flanders.

In the Chuck Jones adaptation, Milo is portrayed by Butch Patrick who also voices his animated form.

=== Tock ===
Tock is a "watchdog" (with an alarm-clock in his body) who befriends Milo after saving him from the Doldrums. Tock was based on one of Juster's favorite characters, Jim Fairfield from Jack Armstrong, the All-American Boy.

In the Chuck Jones adaptation, Tock is voiced by Larry Thor.

=== Humbug ===
The Humbug is a pompous insect who joins Milo and Tock on their quest. Juster said, "For the sake of balance, I wanted someone who was the reverse [of Tock]— a bad influence, someone who is a braggart, not very honest, a huckster, not too trustworthy, a self promoter—in short, someone sure to steer Milo wrong."

In the Chuck Jones adaptation, Humbug is voiced by Les Tremayne.

=== Rhyme and Reason ===
Rhyme and Reason are two princesses who settled disputes. The kings banished them to the Castle in the Air, thus being Milo's MacGuffin. They explain to Milo the reason why he has to study things.

In the Chuck Jones adaptation, Rhyme and Reason are voiced by Patti Gilbert and June Foray respectively.

== Minor characters ==
=== King Azaz ===
King Azaz the Unabridged is the King of Dictionopolis, one of the two rulers of Wisdom.

In the Chuck Jones adaptation, King Azaz is voiced by Hans Conried.

=== Mathemagician ===
The Mathemagician is Azaz's brother and the other ruler of Wisdom. He rules the city of Digitopolis.

In the Chuck Jones adaptation, the Mathemagician is voiced by Hans Conried.

=== Faintly Macabre ===
Faintly Macabre (or Aunt Faintly), the Not-So-Wicked Which. When she regulated all words used in public, she became old and tired and started using less and less words in the posters and ended up using no words at all, and when she put up a poster written 'silence is gold,' King Azaz became angry and imprisoned her. She tells Milo that she can be released from the dungeon with the return of Rhyme and Reason. Juster's comment that "witches hate loud noises" was only a plot device that he made up.

In the Chuck Jones adaptation, Faintly Macabre is voiced by June Foray. Unlike the book that had no mentioning on if she was released or not, Faintly was seen exiting the dungeon and reopening her stand upon Rhyme and Reason's return.

=== Chroma ===
Chroma is the conductor of an orchestra that plays all the world's colors. Feiffer's drawing of Chroma was loosely modelled on Arturo Toscanini

In the Chuck Jones adaptation, Chroma is voiced by Shepard Menken.

=== Dr. Kakafonous A. Dischord ===
Dr. Kakofonous A. Dischord is a scientist who enjoys creating unpleasant sounds, and curing people of pleasant sounds. Feiffer's illustration of him bears a striking resemblance to Groucho Marx as Dr. Hugo Z. Hackenbush.

In the Chuck Jones adaptation, Dr. Kakafonous A. Dischord is voiced by Cliff Norton.

In the book, he welcomes Milo into his wagon after Milo knocked on his door. Later in the book, The Soundkeeper tells Milo that Dr. Dischord was part of the reason why she banished all sound.

=== Awful DYNNE ===
The Awful DYNNE ("awful din") is a genie who collects noises for Dr. Dischord.

In the Chuck Jones adaptation, the Awful DYNNE is voiced by Candy Candido.

=== Soundkeeper ===
The Soundkeeper is a woman who loves silence and rules the Valley of Sound. Her vaults keep all the sounds ever made in history.

=== Dodechahedron ===
The Dodecahedron, an inhabitant of Digitopolis with twelve faces, each of which shows a different emotion. Preliminarily, this character was to be J. Remington Rhomboid, the Mathemagician's assistant, a two-dimensional character who would have become three-dimensional as a reward.

In the Chuck Jones adaptation, the Dodechadedron is voiced by Mel Blanc.

=== Officer Short Shrift ===
Officer Short Shrift is a very short man who works as a police officer of Dictionopolis. He unfairly arrests Milo and Tock where he blames them for wrecking the Dictionopolis Word Fair which Humbug and Spelling Bee did. Officer Short Shrift has a tendency to sentence the characters he arrests for long periods and tends to forget those prison sentences.

In the Chuck Jones adaptation, Officer Short Shrift is voiced by Mel Blanc. This version is shown to have a motorized wheel stand in place of legs, a police siren on his hat, and assumes that everyone is guilty. He first appears when Milo arrives in the Land of Wisdom assuming he is a guilty person. Officer Short Shrift's arrest of Milo and Tock remains intact where he also had to assume the role of judge and jailer to sentence and incarcerate them. By the end of the film, he passes by Milo's car quoting "Everyone is found innocent until proven guilty".

=== Lethargarians ===
The Lethargarians, small mischievous creatures who live in the Doldrums and are incredibly lazy.

In the Chuck Jones adaptation, the Lethargarians have a villainous role being more mischievous and are voiced by an uncredited Thurl Ravenscroft.

=== Spelling Bee ===
The Spelling Bee is a giant bee who is an expert speller, but sometimes an enemy of the Humbug.

In the Chuck Jones adaptation, the Spelling Bee is voiced by Shepard Menken.

=== .58 ===
.58 is a boy who is only .58 of a person from an "average" family, which has 2.58 children.

=== Canby ===
Canby is a frequent visitor to the Island of Conclusions, who is as much "as can be" of any possible quality. Play on the words "can be".

=== King Azaz's Advisors ===
King Azaz's advisors consist of the Duke of Definition, Minister of Meaning, Count of Connotation, Earl of Essence, and Undersecretary of Understanding, all of which have the same (or almost the same) meaning. They welcome Milo and Tock to Dictionopolis as soon as they enter.

In the Chuck Jones adaptation, they are all voiced by Mel Blanc.

=== Whether Man ===
The Whether Man is a man who deals with whether there will be weather, rather than the specific nature of the weather. Note that Feiffer drew Juster as the Whether Man.

In the Chuck Jones adaptation, the Whether Man is voiced by Daws Butler. He had a larger role in the film where he has Milo find his way. The Whether Man also helps to get Rhyme and Reason out of the Castle in the Air.

=== Alec Bings ===
Alec Bings is a boy of Milo's age and weight who sees through things. He grows downwards from a fixed point in the air until he reaches the ground, unlike Milo, who grows upwards from the ground.

=== Everpresent Wordsnatcher ===
The Everpresent Wordsnatcher is a dirty bird that "takes the words right out of your mouth". He is not a demon per se, as everyone who meets him just sees him as an annoyance. Juster considered naming him the "red crested word snatcher".

=== Demons of the Mountains of Ignorance ===
There are different demons that reside in the Mountains of Ignorance. They consist of:

==== Terrible Trivium ====
The Terrible Trivium, a demon in the Mountains of Ignorance who wastes time with useless - or "trivial" - jobs. Leonard S. Marcus observes that The Phantom Tollbooth itself was a procrastinatory diversion and that it is fitting that this occupies the place of pride as the first demon in the rogues' gallery of demons.

In the Chuck Jones adaptation, the Terrible Trivium is voiced by Daws Butler.

==== Demon of Insincerity ====
The Demon of Insincerity is a misleading demon with a great voice and an insignificant body who never says what he means.

In the Chuck Jones adaptation, the Demon of Insincerity is voiced by Mel Blanc.

==== Gelatinous Giant ====
The Gelatinous Giant is a gigantic demon who blends in with his surroundings and is afraid of everything, mostly ideas. It gets its name because it looks like a giant pile of jelly.

In the Chuck Jones adaptation, the Gelatinous Giant is voiced by Daws Butler.

==== Triple Demons of Compromise ====
The Triple Demons of Compromise, "one short and fat, one tall and thin, and one exactly like the other two". Norton gave these a cameo role just to describe something impossible for Jules Feiffer to draw. These were, in notes, originally the Twin Demons of Compromise

==== Senses Taker ====
The Senses Taker ("census taker") is a demon who robs Milo, the Humbug, and Tock of their senses by wasting their time and asking useless questions. Feiffer's illustration was an experiment using spattered ink, later used by Gerald Scarfe and Ralph Steadman a few years later.

In the Chuck Jones adaptation, the Senses Taker is voiced by Daws Butler.

==== Gorgons of Malice and Hate ====
The Gorgons of Malice and Hate are two demons that resemble fast-moving soft-shelled snails with blazing eyes and wet anxious mouths,

==== Horrible Hopping Hindsight ====
The Horrible Hopping Hindsight is a hopping demon with rear-facing eyes that hops backwards.

==== Threadbare Excuse ====
The Threadbare Excuse is a thin demon.

==== Two-Faced Hypocrite ====
The Two-Faced Hypocrite is a two-headed quadrupedal demon.

Exclusive to the film, the Two-Headed Hypocrite joins its fellow demons in attacking Milo, Tock, and Humbug. Milo defeats it by throwing the word "Forthright" at it.

==== Overbearing Know-It-All ====
The Overbearing Know-It-All is a bulbous demon that gives misinformation and bad advice to people.

In the Chuck Jones adaptation, the Overbearing Know-It-All is voiced by Mel Blanc.

==== Dilemma ====
Dilemma is a smoke-snorting demon with long-pointed horns and hooves.

==== Gross Exaggeration ====
The Gross Exaggeration is a grotesque demon whose teeth can mangle any truths. He often works with the Overbearing Know-It-All.

== Unused characters ==
In Juster's notes and drafts, there are a number of characters for which Juster had sketched, but did not use in the final drafts:

- The Doorman - A man who received the package of the tollbooth.
- The small, wild-eyed little man who kept breathlessly repeating "It's here, it's here" who, in early drafts, brought the tollbooth package to the doorman. In the final draft, it is not known who brought the tollbooth, or who sent the tollbooth.
- Mr. and Mrs. Flanders - The parents of Tony (the protagonist's name in early drafts). Tony later became Milo, the latter's age and last name never said. Milo's parents do not appear.
- The Chocolate Moose - A moose who is always afraid he is not light enough.
- The Star Gazer - A person who wonders about everything.
- The Seal of Approval - A seal who was to be one of the princesses' pets.
- The Social Lion - A lion who was to be one of the princesses' pets, with a pun about "reading between the lions".
- The Inventor - A man who never leaves well enough alone and invents improvements or things that have no use, for example straight bananas and square oranges for easy packing in a spherical car, etc.
- The Hitch-Hiker - A man who always leads Milo into doing things the easy way and jumping to conclusions.
- The Optometrist - A man who fits the rose colored glasses.
- The Facsimile - A man who can be just like everyone else.
- Peter Paradox - The assistant to the Mathemagician.
- The Adding Machine - A robot assistant to the Mathemagician.
- The Lucky Boy - A boy that always gets lucky.
