= Handle with Care (1977 film) =

1977 film by Jonathan Demme

- Theatrical release poster
- Directed by: Jonathan Demme
- Written by: Paul Brickman
- Produced by: Freddie Fields
- Starring: Paul Le Mat; Candy Clark; Ann Wedgeworth; Marcia Rodd; Charles Napier
- Cinematography: Jordan Cronenweth
- Edited by: John F. Link
- Music by: Bill Conti
- Distributed by: Paramount Pictures
- Release date: September 29, 1977
- Running time: 98 minutes
- Country: United States
- Language: English
- Budget: $5 million
- Box office: $815,000

Handle with Care (also released as Citizens Band) is a 1977 American comedy film directed by Jonathan Demme. It takes place in a small town in Nebraska and is based on the wide popularity of citizens band radio, widely known as CB at the time. The film was originally released as Citizens Band and was later released in an edited version as Handle with Care.

A paperback novelization of the film written by E.M. Corder was published by Pocket Books in 1977 as "Citizen's Band".

== Plot ==
Spider is a young man who makes a meager living repairing CB radios and spends his spare time volunteering with REACT International. He lives with his father, an irascible retired truck driver whose CB handle is Papa Thermodyne.

Chrome Angel is a truck driver named Harold who is injured in an accident and then issues an emergency call over CB radio. Spider rescues him and takes him to the hospital. During his recovery, Harold is visited by local prostitute Debbie (alias Hot Coffee), who solicits customers over CB. Chrome Angel has two wives, Connie, who calls herself Portland Angel, and Joyce, who lives in Dallas. The women do not know that he is married to both. The two wives arrive in town to discover that Chrome Angel has been seeing Hot Coffee and that they are married to the same man.

Spider's former fiancée Pam (Electra) is a cheerleading coach and physical-education teacher who conducts erotic conversations over the CB with teenage boys. She is romantically interested in Spider's older brother Dean, who goes by the handle of Blood.

After Spider's activities with REACT are disrupted by a gang of local kids holding a frivolous conversation on Channel 9, which is reserved for emergency communications, he decides to embark on a singlehanded crusade to shutter illegal CB stations, such as those using unlawful linear amplifiers. Spider's targets include the Red Baron, a neo-Nazi who uses a high-powered CB base station to broadcast white-supremacist hate speech, and the Hustler, a teenage boy who reads pornography aloud over the air. Spider and a partner from REACT begin a spree of cutting antenna cables, intimidating offenders by visiting their homes and claiming to be Federal Communications Commission (FCC) officials in the hope of cleaning the CB airwaves.

The myriad complicated friendships and odd romantic relationships finally come to a head. Finally, the whole town comes together in a search-and-rescue effort after Papa Thermodyne suddenly disappears.

== Cast ==
- Paul Le Mat as Blayne "Spider" Lovejoy
- Candy Clark as Pam "Electra" Armbruster
- Bruce McGill as Dean "Blood" Lovejoy
- Roberts Blossom as Floyd "Papa Thermodyne" Lovejoy
- Charles Napier as Harold "Chrome Angel"
- Ann Wedgeworth as "Dallas Angel"
- Marcia Rodd as "Portland Angel"
- Alix Elias as Debbie "Hot Coffee"
- Richard Bright as Jack "Smilin' Jack"
- Ed Begley Jr. as The Priest
- Michael Rothman as "Cochise"
- Michael Mahler as The Hustler
- Harry Northup as "The Red Baron"
- Will Seltzer as "Warlock"
- Leila Smith as "Grandma Breaker"

== Reception ==
The film's initial release resulted in disappointing box-office results, leading Paramount to reconsider its campaign and distribution strategy, including renaming the film to deemphasize the CB radio connection because some thought that the word "Band" in the title indicated that it was a musical. The film was renamed Handle with Care for its New York Film Festival showing on September 30, 1977.

The film grossed only $815,530 in the United States and Canada.

Handle with Care currently holds a 100% rating at review aggregator Rotten Tomatoes, with an average critical score of 7.9/10, based on nine reviews.

John Simon called the film "a lovely, hilarious, semisatirical folk comedy, only needing a better ending."

In 2003, The New York Times placed the film on its Best 1000 Movies Ever list.
