= Helen Page Camp =

American actress (1930–1991)

- Publicity Photo of Helen Page Camp
- Born: December 27, 1930; Washington, D.C., U.S.
- Died: August 1, 1991 (aged 60); Los Angeles, California, U.S.
- Occupation: Actress
- Years active: 1968–1991

Helen Page Camp (December 27, 1930 – August 1, 1991) was an American actress.

== Early years ==
Born to Austin and Helen (née Landes) Camp in Washington, D.C., Camp's career began onstage, most notably Off Broadway in New York City.

== Career ==
Her first known or credited screen appearance in film or television came in 1968, when she was 37 years old, as "Lucy" on Here Come the Brides.

=== Film ===
In 1971, she was in the movie Cold Turkey as Mrs. Watson.

=== Television ===
Later, she made guest appearances on popular shows such as The Wild Wild West, Maude (six different roles; most notably with James Coco as the swinging married couple "Channing and Hortence McGrath"), All in the Family, Cheers, Gimme a Break!, Thirtysomething and Newhart.

In early 1976, the characters of Laverne De Fazio (Penny Marshall) and Shirley Feeney (Cindy Williams) from Happy Days were spun off into an equally successful eponymous sitcom, Laverne & Shirley, and Camp was cast in two episodes as the girls' landlady, Mrs. Havenwurst, but the role was short-lived. In the fall of 1976, actress Betty Garrett permanently replaced her as Laverne and Shirley's new landlady, Mrs. Babish.

Camp portrayed Tanya Terwilliger on The Tony Randall Show (1976-1978), Millie Capestro on 13 Queens Boulevard (1979), and the title character's mother on Richie Brockelman, Private Eye (1978),

In 1990, Camp assumed the role of Margaret Furth on The Fresh Prince of Bel-Air. Ms. Camp's final television role saw her as Hope Lacey in the "Faith, Hope & Charity" episode of MacGyver (S6.E18) that aired on March 18, 1991.

== Death ==
Camp died in Los Angeles, California after a stroke on August 1, 1991, at the age of 60.

== Filmography ==
A partial list of roles in both film and television follows:

Year	Title	Role	Notes
1971	Cold Turkey	Mrs. Watson	
1972	The Bob Newhart Show	Mrs. Prince / Myrna Hoover	2 episodes
1972	Get to Know Your Rabbit	Mrs. Wendel	directed by Brian De Palma
1972-78	Maude	Nurse/Mother Mary Keaton/Hortence McGrath	6 episodes
1973	Gunsmoke	Woman/Seva Ballou	2 episodes
1973	The Girls of Huntington House	Nurse Caulfield	ABC Movie of the Week
1974	Dirty Sally	Mrs. Fromley	S1.E12 - "The Hanging of Cyrus Pike"
1975	Happy Days	Miss Wheaton	S2.E23 - "Goin' To Chicago"
1975-76	Kojak	Mrs. Chester/Mrs. Waring	2 episodes
1976	All's Fair	Nurse Adams	S1.E9 - "Happy Anniversary: Part 2"
1976	Laverne & Shirley	Mrs. Havenwurst	2 episodes
1976	The Nancy Walker Show	Agnes/Alice	2 episodes
1977	Telefon	Emma Stark	
1977	The Tony Randall Show	Tanya Terwilliger	S2.E7 - "Love vs. Excitement"
1978	The Incredible Hulk	Sarah	S1.E12 - "The Waterfront Story"
1978	Eight Is Enough	Clerk	S2.E15 - "A Hair of the Dog"
1978	The Waltons	Allie	S6.E20 -"The Return"
1978	The New Maverick	Mrs. Flora Crupper	TV film (ABC)
1979	13 Queens Boulevard	Mildred Capestro	9 episodes
1979	Angie	Mother Janet	S2.E4 - "Marie's Crush"
1979	Archie Bunker's Place	Miss Gucci	S1.E9 - "Murray and the Liquor Board"
1979-80	A New Kind of Family	Aunt Mazie	2 episodes
1980	Galactica 1980	Saleslady	S1.E4 - "The Super Scouts"
1981	Stand by Your Man	Mother Pugh	TV film (CBS)
1981	It's a Living	Catherine	S1.E8
1982	Hart to Hart	Mrs. Essen	S3.E18 - "Deep in the Hart of Dixieland"
1982	Fast-Walking	Ted's Wife	
1982	Maggie	Sister Louise	S1.E7 - "Mark's Shrink"
1982	The Escape Artist	Neighbor	
1982	Best Friends	Maid	
1983	The Love Boat	Marsha Newman	S6.E17 - "Gopher's Daisy/Our Son, the Lawyer/Salvaged Romance"
1983	Knots Landing	Mrs. Grace	S4.E15 - "To Have and to Hold"
1985	Diff'rent Strokes	Mrs. Gordon	S8.E8 - "Speak No Evil"
1986	Newhart	Alma Sproat	S4.E23 - "Replaceable You"
1986	St. Elsewhere	Mrs. Deangelis	S5.E3 - "A Room with a View"
1987	Gimme a Break!	Mrs. Bennett	S6.E21 - "Parents' Week: Part 1"
1987	Mama's Family	Pearl	S3.E15 - "Porn Again"
1987	What a Country!	Sydelle Garver	S1.E25 - "The Apartment"
1988	Small Wonder	Bank teller	S3.E14 - "Here Today, Gone Tomorrow"
1988	Cop	Estelle Peltz	
1988	Family Ties	Vera	S7.E4 - "Beyond Therapy"
1988	Portrait of a White Marriage	Audience Woman #2	
1988	Scandal in a Small Town	Mrs. Bengston	TV film (NBC)
1990	Life Goes On	Selma	S1.E19 - "Becca and the Underground Newspaper"
1990	The Fresh Prince of Bel-Air	Margaret Furth	3 episodes
1990	Dear John	Aunt Trudy	S3.E7 - "Hole in One"
1990	Thirtysomething	Mrs. Lerner	S3.E16 - "Her Cup Runneth Over"
1991	MacGyver	Hope Lacey	S6.E18 -"Faith, Hope & Charity"
1991	The Wonder Years	Opal Arnold	S4.E13 - "Who's Aunt Rose?"
