= A Barrel of Laughs, a Vale of Tears =

1995 book by Jules Feiffer

- Author: Jules Feiffer
- Illustrator: Jules Feiffer
- Language: English
- Genre: Children's novel
- Publisher: HarperCollins
- Publication date: 1995
- Publication place: United States
- Media type: Print (hardback & paperback)
- Pages: 180 pp
- ISBN: 978-0-06-205099-1
- OCLC: 33950950
- LC Class: PZ8.F358 Bar 1995

A Barrel of Laughs, a Vale of Tears is a children's book written and illustrated by Jules Feiffer, first published in 1995 by HarperCollins. The first edition was a library binding with 180 pages.

WorldCat Identities contains records of seven editions of this book in 765 libraries worldwide.

There is a musical adaptation of the book with music by Julia Adolphe and libretto by Stephanie Fleischmann.

== Synopsis ==
A Barrel of Laughs, a Vale of Tears follows the young prince Roger, who haphazardly sets out on a quest to prepare himself to become king. The book expresses the emotions of various individuals through two long-lost lovers reunited, several unlikely couples marrying, and a friend-turned-evil's attempts for revenge. While Roger himself starts out as pure and innocent, he seems somewhat naive and incapable of feeling serious.

The quest, which contains plenty of sad events, gradually brings Roger to a point where he still is humorous, but is caring about specific individuals as opposed to finding shallow humor in everything. The beautiful Princess Petulia, and her servant, likewise, find similar changes in personality through their experiences, as they go from being bitterly indifferent to loving and plainspoken to kinder respectively.

== Publication history ==
- Feiffer, Jules (1995). A Barrel of Laughs, a Vale of Tears. New York: HarperCollins Publishers. ISBN 978-0-06-205099-1.
- Feiffer, Jules (1995). A Barrel of Laughs, a Vale of Tears. New York: HarperCollins Publishers. ISBN 978-0-06-205098-4.
- Feiffer, Jules (1998). A Barrel of Laughs, a Vale of Tears. New York: HarperCollins Publishers. ISBN 978-0-06-205926-0.
- Feiffer, Jules (2001). A Barrel of Laughs, a Vale of Tears. Prince Frederick: Recorded Books, LLC. ISBN 978-1-4025-1961-1.
- Feiffer, Jules (2001). A Barrel of Laughs, a Vale of Tears. Prince Frederick: Recorded Books, LLC. ISBN 978-0-7887-5344-2.
- Feiffer, Jules (2001). A Barrel of Laughs, a Vale of Tears. Prince Frederick: Recorded Books, LLC. ISBN 978-0-7887-5376-3.
- Feiffer, Jules (2003). Der Fluch Des Lachens. München: Omnibus. ISBN 978-3-570-21081-9. (German language)
