= The Phantom Tollbooth =

1961 children's novel by Norton Juster and Illustrator Jules Feiffer

- Cover illustration of Milo and Tock
- Author: Norton Juster
- Illustrator: Jules Feiffer
- Genre: Fantasy
- Publisher: Epstein & Carroll, distributed by Random House
- Publication date: August 12, 1961
- Publication place: United States
- Media type: Print (hardcover)
- Pages: 255
- ISBN: 978-0-394-82037-8
- OCLC: 576002319
- LC Class: PZ7.J98 Ph

The Phantom Tollbooth is a children's fantasy novel written by Norton Juster, with illustrations by Jules Feiffer, first published in 1961. The story follows a bored young boy named Milo who unexpectedly receives a magic tollbooth that transports him to the once prosperous, but now troubled, Kingdom of Wisdom. Along with a dog named Tock and the Humbug, Milo goes on a quest to the Castle in the Air seeking the kingdom's two exiled princesses, named Rhyme and Reason. As Milo learns valuable lessons, he finds a love of learning in a story full of puns and wordplay, such as exploring the literal meanings of idioms.

In 1958, Juster had received a Ford Foundation grant for a children's book about cities. Unable to make progress on that project, he turned to writing what became The Phantom Tollbooth, his first book. His housemate, Feiffer, a cartoonist, interested himself in the project. Jason Epstein, an editor at Random House, bought the book and published it. The Phantom Tollbooth received rave reviews and has as of 2021 sold almost five million copies, far more than expected. It has been adapted into a film, opera, and play, and translated into many languages.

Though the book is on its face an adventure story, a major theme is the need for a love of education; through this, Milo applies what he has learned in school, advances in his personal development, and learns to love the life that previously bored him. Critics have compared its appeal to that of Lewis Carroll's Alice's Adventures in Wonderland and to L. Frank Baum's The Wonderful Wizard of Oz. Additionally Maurice Sendak, in his introductory "An Appreciation" included in editions of the book since 1996, quotes a critic as comparing The Phantom Tollbooth to John Bunyan's Pilgrim's Progress: "As Pilgrim's Progress is concerned with the awakening of the sluggardly spirit, The Phantom Tollbooth is concerned with the awakening of the lazy mind."

== Plot ==
Map drawn by the author, since the illustrator, Jules Feiffer did not like to draw maps.

Milo is a boy bored by the world around him; every activity seems a waste of time. He arrives home from another boring day at school to find a mysterious package. Among its contents are a small tollbooth and a map of "the Lands Beyond", illustrating the Kingdom of Wisdom (which will also guide the reader from its place on the endpapers of the book). Attached to the package is a note "For Milo, who has plenty of time." Warned by an included sign to have his destination in mind, he decides without much thought to go to Dictionopolis, assuming this is a pretend game to be played on the floor of his room. He maneuvers through the tollbooth in his electric toy car and instantly finds himself driving on a road that is clearly not in his city apartment.

Milo begins with Expectations, a pleasant place where he starts on Wisdom's road. In Expectations, he seeks directions from the Whether Man, who is full of endless talk. As Milo drives on, he daydreams and gets lost in the Doldrums, a colorless place where nothing ever happens. Milo soon joins the inhabitants, the Lethargarians, in killing time there, a pastime angrily interrupted by the arrival of Tock, a talking, oversized dog with an alarm clock on each side (a "watchdog"), who tells Milo that only by thinking can he get out of the Doldrums. Head abuzz with unaccustomed thoughts, Milo is soon back on his road, and Tock joins him on his journey through Wisdom.

Milo and Tock travel to Dictionopolis, one of two capital cities of the divided Kingdom of Wisdom and home to King Azaz the Unabridged. They meet King Azaz's cabinet officials and visit the Word Market, where the words and letters are sold that empower the world. A fight between the Spelling Bee and the blustering Humbug breaks up the market, and Milo and Tock are arrested by the very short Officer Shrift. In prison, Milo meets Faintly Macabre, the Not-so-Wicked Which (not to be confused with Witch), long in charge of which words should be used in Wisdom. She tells him how the two rulers, King Azaz and his brother, the Mathemagician, had two adopted younger sisters, Rhyme and Reason, to whom everyone came to settle disputes. All lived in harmony until the rulers disagreed with the princesses' decision that letters (championed by Azaz) and numbers (by the Mathemagician) were equally important. They banished the princesses to the Castle in the Air and, since then, the land has had neither Rhyme nor Reason.

Milo and Tock leave the dungeon. King Azaz hosts them at a banquet where the guests literally eat their words, served to them on plates. After the meal, King Azaz lets Milo and Tock talk themselves into a dangerous quest to rescue the princesses. Azaz flatters the Humbug into being their guide, and boy, dog and insect set off for the Mathemagician's capital of Digitopolis as they must gain his approval before they can begin their quest.

Along the way, they meet such characters as Alec Bings, a little boy suspended in the air who sees through things and who will "grow down" until he reaches the ground. He then meets the world's shortest giant, the world's tallest midget, the world's thinnest fat man, and the world's fattest thin man, who turn out to just be one regular man. Milo then loses time in substituting for Chroma the Great, a conductor whose orchestra creates the colors of the world.

They meet a twelve-sided creature called the Dodecahedron, who leads them to Digitopolis. There, they meet the Mathemagician, who is still angry at Azaz and who will not give his blessing to anything that his brother has approved. Milo maneuvers him into saying he will permit the quest if the boy can show the two have concurred on anything since they banished the princesses. To the number wizard's shock, Milo proves that the two have agreed to disagree, and the Mathemagician gives his reluctant consent.

In the Mountains of Ignorance, the journeyers contend with demons such as the Terrible Trivium and the Gelatinous Giant. After overcoming obstacles and their own fears, they reach the Castle in the Air. Princesses Rhyme and Reason welcome Milo and agree to return to Wisdom. Unable to enter the castle, the demons cut it loose, letting it drift away, but Milo realizes Tock can carry them down because 'time flies'.

The demons pursue, but the armies of Wisdom arrive and repel them. Rhyme and Reason heal the divisions in the old Kingdom of Wisdom, Azaz and the Mathemagician are reconciled, and all enjoy a three-day celebration.

Milo says goodbye and drives back through the tollbooth. Suddenly he is back in his own room, and discovers he has been gone only an hour, though his journey seemed to take weeks. He awakens the next day with plans to return to the kingdom, but finds the tollbooth gone when he gets home from school. A note instead is there, "For Milo, who now knows the way." The note states that the tollbooth is being sent to another child who needs help finding direction in life. Milo is somewhat disappointed but agrees and looks at a now-interesting world around him, concluding that even if he found a way back, he might not have time to go, for there is so much to do right where he is.

== Writing ==
Architect Norton Juster was living in his hometown of Brooklyn, after three years in the Navy. In June 1960, he gained a $5,000 grant from the Ford Foundation to write a children's book about cities. Juster argued that the young baby boomers would soon have responsibility for the cities, and many lived in the suburbs and did not know them. In his proposal, he said he wanted "to stimulate and heighten perception – to help children notice and appreciate the visual world around them – to help excite them and shape their interest in an environment they will eventually reshape." Beginning with great enthusiasm, he ground to a halt with too many notes and too little progress. He took a weekend break with friends at Fire Island, and came back determined to put aside the cities book and seek inspiration in another writing project.

Milo continued to think of all sorts of things; of the many detours and wrong turns that were so easy to take, of how fine it was to be moving and, most of all, of how much could be accomplished with just a little thought.

— The Phantom Tollbooth (after exiting the Doldrums)

Juster's guilt over his lack of progress on the cities book had led him to write pieces of stories about a little boy named Milo, which he began to develop into a book. Juster quit his job so that he could work on the book. His imagination fired by a boy who approached him on the street and with whom he discussed the nature of infinity, Juster wanted to finish the story about "a boy who asked too many questions" before returning to the book on cities. Juster shared his house in Brooklyn Heights with cartoonist Jules Feiffer whose bedroom was immediately below, and who could hear him pacing in the night. Feiffer was surprised to learn that his friend's insomnia was not caused by the cities book, but by a book about a boy. Juster showed Feiffer the draft to date and, unbidden, the artist began sketching illustrations. Feiffer knew Judy Sheftel, who put deals together in the publishing trade and was his future bride. Sheftel got Jason Epstein, an innovative editor at Random House with a deep appreciation for children's literature, to agree to review the manuscript. Some at Random House considered the book's vocabulary too difficult: at the time, educators advised against children's literature containing words the target audience did not already know, fearing the unfamiliar would discourage young learners. Based on seven chapters of manuscript, plus a three-page outline of the rest of the story, Epstein bought the book.

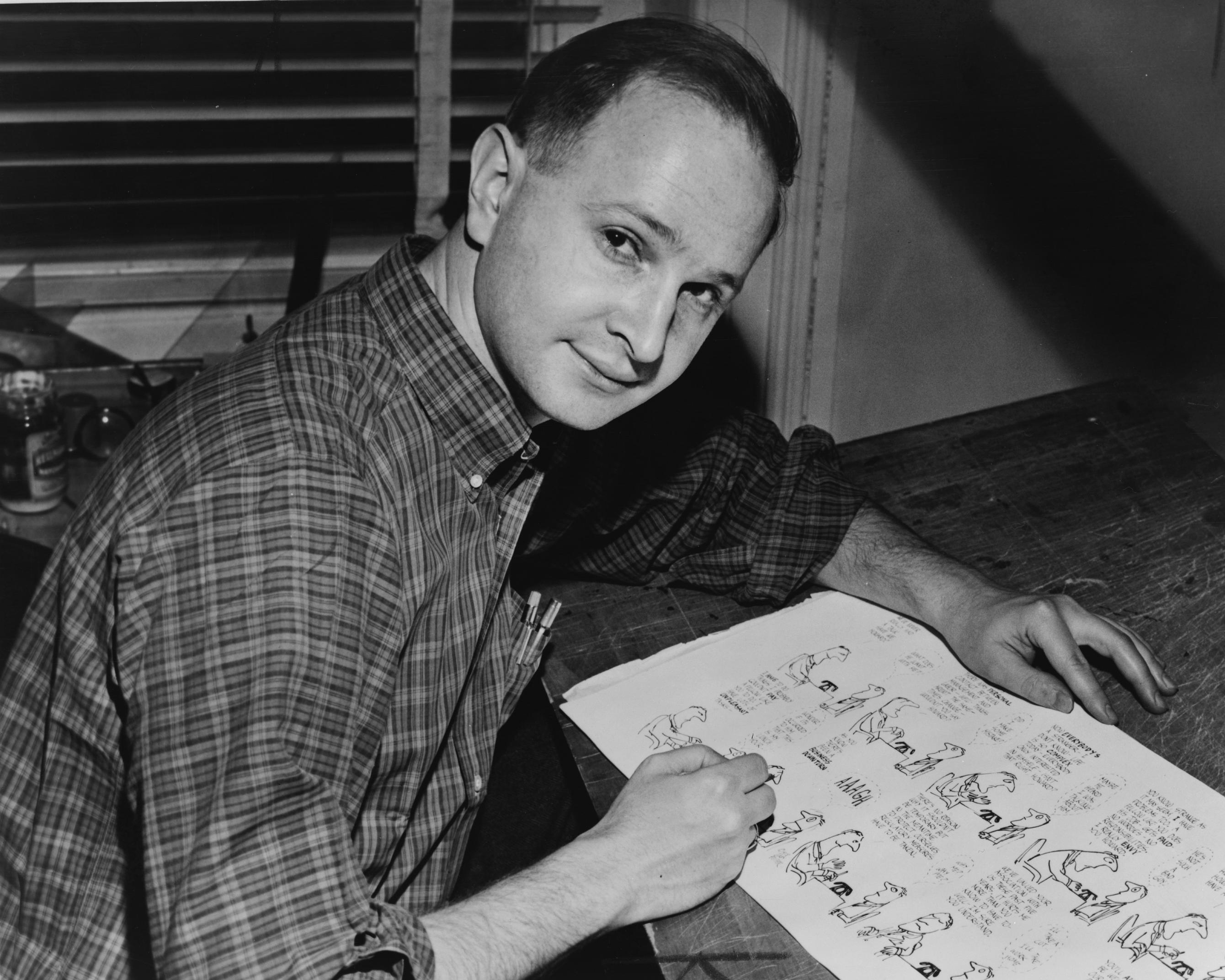
Feiffer in 1958 with pictures from his first book

Since Juster did the cooking for the housemates, if Feiffer wanted to eat, he had to do the drawings. Feiffer quickly realized the book would require illustrations of the type and quality that John Tenniel had created for Lewis Carroll's Alice's Adventures in Wonderland and although a nationally known artist, doubted his competence to do the text justice. Feiffer considers the double-spread illustration of demons late in the book to be a success and one of his favorites. It differs from his usual style (which would involve a white background), and instead uses Gustave Doré's drawings as an inspiration.

It became a game, with Feiffer trying to draw things the way he wanted, and Juster trying to describe things that were impossible to sketch. These included the Triple Demons of Compromise—one short and fat, one tall and thin, and the third exactly like the first two. Feiffer got his revenge by depicting the author as the Whether Man, clad in a toga.

Repeated edits altered the protagonist's name (originally Tony), removed his parents entirely from the book, and deleted text attempting to describe how the tollbooth package had been delivered. Milo's age was removed from the text—early drafts have him aged eight or nine—as Juster decided not to state it, lest potential readers decide they were too old to care.

== Themes ==
Since no one has ever bothered to explain the importance of learning to Milo, he regards school as the biggest waste of time in his life. Juster intended that the book speak to the importance of learning to love learning. Teaching methods that might bore children, by memorization for example, are mocked in the book, as in the case of the Spelling Bee. Like the Bee, the Humbug's insult to his fellow insect goes over Milo's head, but possibly not the reader's: "A slavish concern for the composition of words is the sign of a bankrupt intellect." According to Mary Liston in her journal article on law in fantasy realms, "The Phantom Tollbooth concerns the difference between education and wisdom and what processes are conducive to synthesizing both, so as to encourage an attitude of engagement, alertness, and responsibility within an increasingly autonomous individual."

"BOSH!" replied the Humbug. "We're an old and noble family, honorable to the core—Insecticus humbugium, if I may use the Latin. Why, we fought in the crusades with Richard the Lion Heart, crossed the Atlantic with Columbus, blazed trails with the pioneers, and today many members of the family hold important government positions throughout the world. History is full of Humbugs."

— The Phantom Tollbooth (in Dictionopolis)

Another theme is the need for common sense to back up rules. Milo journeys through a land where, without Rhyme or Reason, the art of governance has been lost, leading to bizarre results. Milo repeatedly meets characters to whom words are more important than their meaning. The Whether Man, for all his talk, is unable to provide Milo with the information or guidance the boy wants, while Officer Shrift's investigation of the overturning of the Word Market contains the forms of law, without justice. The denizens around Digitopolis are little better; the twelve-faced Dodecahedron, named for what he is, turns the logic of his naming on its head when he asks if everyone with one face is called Milo. The attitudes now displayed by the adherents of both brothers are summed up by the Dodecahedron, "as long as the answer is right, who cares if the question is wrong?"

As Milo struggles with words and begins the process of making himself their master, he also has difficulty with numbers, especially when he speaks with .58 of a child, who with parents and two siblings (whom Milo does not meet) makes up an average family. Milo has had difficulties in school with mathematics and problem solving; his reaction to this encounter is to protest that averages are not real. The partial child enlightens Milo that there is beauty in math beyond the tedium of learning an endless set of rules, "one of the nicest things about mathematics, or anything else you might care to learn, is that many of the things which can never be, often are". Late in the book, Princess Reason counsels Milo, who has much learning ahead of him, not to be discouraged by its complexity, "You must never feel badly about making mistakes ... as long as you take the trouble to learn from them. For you often learn more by being wrong for the right reasons than you do by being right for the wrong reasons". An index card in the Juster papers sets forth the germ of the princess' "memorable" counsel to Milo, "Quite often the road to Rhyme + Reason is through the right mistakes."

Although Milo is bored with learning, that does not mean he knew nothing before his journey. He exhibits characteristics of a well-schooled child of his time; his speech is polite and peppered with "please" and "thank you", and when he unexpectedly encounters the partial child, he requests pardon for staring. He can count to a thousand, though his tact in bringing up the subject in the presence of the numbers-hating King Azaz is not the best. Mindful of his mother's admonition to eat lightly when a guest, he initially orders a light meal at the banquet, only to find the waiters bringing in insubstantial light beams. Not realizing he will be asked to eat his words, he then makes a plausible start at a speech before being interrupted by the king. The Phantom Tollbooth displays Milo's growth; Leonard S. Marcus in his notes to its annotated edition writes that the boy learns to think in the abstract, pledging after his unintentional jump to Conclusions that he will not make up his mind again without a good reason. Milo does not accept the word of the demon of insincerity that he is a threat and is rewarded by learning he is not. Just for a moment, Milo is able to float in the air beside Alec Bings and see things from the perspective he will have as an adult, allowing the young reader to contemplate what it will be like to do the same. According to Liston, Milo "transforms himself from an unthinking and compliant Lethargarian to a young adult with greater consciousness, a firmer sense of self, and a newly found set of responsibilities".

Even though the day is won by Milo and his fellow questers, it is a great but not a permanent victory, as he hears the kingly brothers begin to argue again as he departs. Juster has written that it was his intent to get Milo out of there as quickly as possible, and that "the fight would have to be won again and again".

Milo's trip through the lands beyond the tollbooth teaches the previously bored child to appreciate both journey and destination. This is a lesson that had been unlearned by the citizens of Wisdom, as exemplified by the described fate of the twin cities of Reality and Illusions. Although the city of Illusions never actually existed, Reality was lost as its residents concentrated on getting to their destination as quickly as possible, and, unappreciated, the city withered away, unnoticed by the busy people who still hasten along its former streets. Milo meets his trials by defining himself as different from the kingdom's inhabitants, who either demand or accept conformity, as enforced by the kingdom's laws, which discourage (and even outlaw) thought. Milo cannot accept such laws, beginning when, in the Doldrums, he thinks, thus violating a local ordinance and separating himself from the thoughtless inhabitants. Liston opined that because the Kingdom of Wisdom's "laws require the impossible, they contradict what it means to be fully human".

== Influences and comparisons ==
The Phantom Tollbooth contains allusions to many works, including those loved by Juster in his own upbringing. Some of Juster's favorite books as a child, including The Wind in the Willows, had endpaper maps; Juster insisted on one, over Feiffer's opposition, going so far as to sketch one and require that his collaborator reproduce it in his own style. Juster was also inspired by his father Samuel's love of puns, with which the book is more than sprinkled. In his childhood, Juster spent much time listening to the radio. According to Juster, the need to envision the action when listening to radio serials helped inspire The Phantom Tollbooth, as well as yielding the character of Tock, based on sidekick Jim Fairfield from Jack Armstrong, the All-American Boy. Jim gave Tock his wisdom, courage, and adventurous spirit. As a child, Juster had synesthesia, and could only do arithmetic by making associations between numbers and colors. He remembered that the condition affected word associations. "One of the things I always did was think literally when I heard words. On the Lone Ranger [radio serial] they would say, 'Here come the Injuns!' and I always had an image of engines, of train engines."

"Oh dear, all those words again," thought Milo as he climbed into the wagon with Tock and the cabinet members. "How are you going to make it move? It doesn't have a—"
"Be very quiet," advised the duke, "for it goes without saying."
And, sure enough, as soon as they were all quite still, it began to move through the streets, and in a very short time they arrived at the royal palace.

— The Phantom Tollbooth (in Dictionopolis)

Some of the incidents in the book stem from Juster's own past. In Digitopolis, the Numbers Mine, where gemlike numerals are dug for, recalled one of Juster's architecture professors at the University of Pennsylvania, who compared numbers and equations to jewels. The Marx Brothers films were a staple for Juster as a child and his father would quote lengthy passages from the movies; this inspired the unending series of straight-faced puns that fills the book.

Growing up in a Jewish-American household where the parents demanded high achievement, Juster was intimately familiar with expectations, though in his case many of his parents' hopes were centered on his older brother, an academic star. The Terrible Trivium, the well-dressed, polite demon who sets the questers to mindless tasks, was Juster's way of representing his own tendency to avoid what he should be doing in favor of a more congenial occupation, such as his evasion of the grant project to write The Phantom Tollbooth. Juster drew on Feiffer's life experiences as well; the Whether Man's adage "Expect everything, I always say, and the unexpected never happens" was a favorite of the cartoonist's mother.

Juster had not read Alice's Adventures in Wonderland when he wrote The Phantom Tollbooth, but the two books, each about a bored child plunged into a world of absurd logic, have repeatedly been compared. According to Daniel Hahn in his 2012 article on the Juster book, "Alice is clearly Milo's closest literary kin". Milo's conversation with the Whether Man, which leaves him no more comprehending than when he came, recalls that of Alice with the Cheshire Cat. The questions of authority (something omnipresent for a child) and of justice run through both books; the Queen of Hearts' arbitrary justice is echoed, though with less violence, by Officer Shrift. Alice's sovereigns, representing the authority figures of Victorian childhood life, rule absolutely (though not necessarily effectively); a child of the post-World War II world, Milo journeys through a more bureaucratic realm. His quest is far more purposeful than the frustrating journey Alice experiences, and the outcome differs as well—Milo restores his kingdom while Alice overturns hers. Carroll leaves us uncertain if Alice has learned anything from her adventures, but Juster makes it clear that Milo has acquired tools he will need to find his way through life.

== Publication and reception ==
The Phantom Tollbooth was published in September 1961. Its competition among new books for the minds and hearts of children included Roald Dahl's James and the Giant Peach. The Bronze Bow, set in the Biblical times, was newly available, and brought Elizabeth George Speare her second Newbery Award in three years. Neither publisher nor first-time author expected many sales for The Phantom Tollbooth, but Juster was nevertheless disappointed not to find his work on store shelves. His mother, Minnie, did her part, as her son put it, "terrorizing" bookstore owners into displaying it.

"What a silly system." The boy laughed. "Then your head keeps changing its height and you always see things in a different way? Why, when you're fifteen things won't look at all the way they did when you were ten, and at twenty everything will change again."
"I suppose so," replied Milo, for he had never really thought about the matter.

— The Phantom Tollbooth (meeting the elevated Alec Bings)

Juster says the book was rescued from the remainders table when Emily Maxwell wrote a strong review of it in The New Yorker. Maxwell wrote, "As Pilgrim's Progress is concerned with the awakening of the sluggardly spirit, The Phantom Tollbooth is concerned with the awakening of the lazy mind." Hers was far from the only positive piece; children's author Ann McGovern reviewed it for The New York Times, writing "Norton Juster's amazing fantasy has something wonderful for anyone old enough to relish the allegorical wisdom of Alice in Wonderland and the pointed whimsy of The Wizard of Oz". John Crosby wrote for the New York Herald Tribune, "In a world which sometimes seems to have gone mad, it is refreshing to pause and consider for a moment a book for children which contains a character called 'Faintly Macabre, the not-so-wicked Which.' The name of the book is The Phantom Tollbooth and it was written by a bearded elf named Norton Juster and illustrated by Jules Feiffer, who is the cleverest of the young neurotics". Dissenting was the Bulletin of the Center for Children's Books, which in March 1962 deemed the book an "intensive and extensive fantasy, heavily burdened with contrivance and whimsy".

In 1962, the book was published in Britain. Siriol Hugh-Jones wrote for The Times Literary Supplement, "The Phantom Tollbooth is something every adult seems sure will turn into a modern Alice ... The obvious guess is that the appeal of this sort of writing is directed towards just the sort of adults who derive a perfectly grown-up pleasure from regularly rereading the Alices. As one might expect, it is illustrated by every grown-up's favourite child-like pictures with the built-in sad sophistication, the work of Jules Feiffer." Jennifer Bourdillon reviewed it for The Listener, "This is the story of an imaginary journey, a sort of Pilgrim's Progress of a little boy in his car ... One would hardly have thought from the sound of this that it would have so magnetic an appeal, but the brilliant verbal humour and the weird and wonderful characters (the Dodecahedron, the Watchdog, Faintly Macabre) make it that rare delight, a book which parents and children can share." It reached Australia in 1963; The Canberra Times' reviewer, J.E.B., deemed it memorable, causing readers to quote from it and leaf through its pages again.

== Later history, editions and adaptations ==
After publication, Juster sent a copy of the book to the Ford Foundation, with an explanation of how the projected book on cities had transformed into The Phantom Tollbooth. He never heard back from them, and learned years later that they were delighted by the turn of events. With the book having become an unexpected hit, Juster found himself answering letters from young readers and a few parents. He found that children understood the wordplay at different ages, and he heard from the occasional college student as well. Some students wrote a second time after a gap of years "and they'll talk to me about a whole different book, normally. But now they've got a lot more of the words right. A lot more of the fun kind of crazy references". He learned too that readers were capable of more than he had intended, as in the case of the letter sent by the Mathemagician to King Azaz. Composed entirely of numbers, some readers assumed it was a code and set about breaking it, only to appeal to Juster for help when they were not successful. The numbers were not intended to have any meaning, and were meant to convey that the Mathemagician's letter could not have been understood by Azaz or his advisers.

And, in the very room in which he sat, there were books that could take you anywhere, and things to invent, and make, and build, and break, and all the puzzle and excitement of everything he didn't know—music to play, songs to sing, and worlds to imagine and then someday make real. His thoughts darted eagerly about as everything looked new—and worth trying.

— The Phantom Tollbooth (home again)

As the book became acclaimed as a modern classic, it began to be used in the classroom, and Juster corresponded with some teachers. After the book's readers attained adulthood, they wrote of its influence on them. Novelist Cathleen Schine recalled, "it was as if someone had turned on the lights. The concepts of irony, of double entendre, of words as play, of the pleasure and inevitability of intellectual absurdity, were suddenly accessible to me. They made sense to me in an extremely personal way." British fantasy writer Diana Wynne Jones read her copy so often it fell apart: "it didn't occur to us that it might be about something. It struck us as a little like The Wizard of Oz, only better." One reader, signing himself "Milo", wrote to Rolling Stone in 1970, "If you want to get freaked out of your undernourished head, pick up The Phantom Tollbooth, by Norton Juster. They tell you it's a kids' book, but take my word for it, no one who reads it is ever the same. No hype."

The book continued to garner positive reviews and comments. In 1998, Amanda Foreman wrote for The Sunday Times of London, "I want to shout about The Phantom from the rooftops. I want to stand in Waterloo and press copies into people's hands. This is a book that should be in every home. ... Whether you are 8 or 88 Juster's mixture of allegorical wisdom and logical whimsy will take you on a journey of the spirit. The Phantom is a mappa mundi of our hearts, proving once again that in laughter and simplicity lies the truth of life". In a 2011 article written for the book's fiftieth anniversary, Adam Gopnik wrote, "The book is made magical by Juster's and Feiffer's gift for transforming abstract philosophical ideas into unforgettable images."

The book has been translated into many foreign languages, including Chinese, Croatian, German, Hebrew, Japanese, Korean, Russian, Thai, Turkish and three different Spanish editions: one for Spain, one for Latin America, and one for Spanish speakers in the United States. Juster stated that he did not know if the wordplay of the original carries through to the translated works. In 1969, Chuck Jones made The Phantom Tollbooth into a musical film of the same name, produced and released by Metro-Goldwyn-Mayer in 1970. Milo's town and room were depicted in live action, with the film changing to animation beyond the tollbooth. Juster disliked the film, describing it as "drivel". The classical composer Robert Xavier Rodriguez in 1987 composed A Colorful Symphony based on the work. Audiobooks of The Phantom Tollbooth have been narrated by Norman Dietz, David Hyde Pierce, and Rainn Wilson.

In 2011, The Annotated Phantom Tollbooth was published, which includes sketches and copies of Juster's handwritten drafts and word lists, Feiffer's early drawings, and an introduction and annotations by Leonard S. Marcus. A fiftieth anniversary edition was also published, with appreciations by Maurice Sendak, Michael Chabon and Philip Pullman. More than three million copies have been sold of the original book in the U.S. alone. It has been adapted into a small-scale opera with music by Arnold Black, and a book by Juster and Sheldon Harnick, produced by Opera Delaware in 1995. It was then revamped into a musical that had its debut to strong reviews at the Kennedy Center in Washington, D.C., and then made a national tour.

The Phantom Tollbooth remains acknowledged as a classic of children's literature. Based on a 2007 online poll, the U.S. National Education Association listed it as one of the "Teachers' Top 100 Books for Children". In 2012, it was ranked number 21 among all-time children's novels in a survey published by School Library Journal.

In 2017, TriStar Pictures announced that Matt Shakman would direct its upcoming "live-action/hybrid" film adaptation of The Phantom Tollbooth. In 2018, Carlos Saldanha replaced Shakman due to scheduling conflicts. Theodore Melfi is drafting the screenplay after Michael Vukadinovich and Phil Johnston.

In 2011, Juster stated that he felt that his book still had relevance, even though children's lives had changed since 1961:

When I grew up I still felt like that puzzled kid—disconnected, disinterested and confused. There was no rhyme or reason in his life. My thoughts focused on him, and I began writing about his childhood, which was really mine ... Today's world of texting and tweeting is quite a different place, but children are still the same as they've always been. They still get bored and confused, and still struggle to figure out the important questions of life. Well, one thing has changed: As many states eliminate tolls on highways, some children may never encounter a real tollbooth. Luckily there are other routes to the Lands Beyond. And it is possible to seek them, and fun to try.

== See also ==
- List of The Phantom Tollbooth characters

== Other works cited ==
- Juster, Norton; Marcus, Leonard (2011). The Annotated Phantom Tollbooth. New York: Knopf. ISBN 978-0-375-85715-7.
- Liston, Mary (Spring 2009). "The Rule of Law Through the Looking Glass". Law and Literature. 21 (1): 42–77. doi:10.1525/lal.2009.21.1.42. JSTOR 10.1525/lal.2009.21.1.42. S2CID 145697726.

== Selected editions ==
- Juster, Norton (1961). The Phantom Tollbooth. Epstein & Carroll.
- Juster, Norton (1964). The Phantom Tollbooth. Random House.
- Juster, Norton (1971). The Phantom Tollbooth. Scholastic Inc. ISBN 978-0-590-40917-9.
- Juster, Norton (1996). The Phantom Tollbooth, 35th Anniversary Edition. Knopf. ISBN 978-0-394-91500-5.
- Juster, Norton (2011). The Phantom Tollbooth, 50th Anniversary Edition. Knopf. ISBN 978-0-375-86903-7.
- Juster, Norton; Marcus, Leonard (2011). The Annotated Phantom Tollbooth. Knopf. ISBN 978-0-375-85715-7.
- Juster, Norton (2014). The Phantom Tollbooth, Essential Modern Classics. Knopf. ISBN 978-0-00-726348-6.
