= Humbug =

Slang term for fraud or nonsense

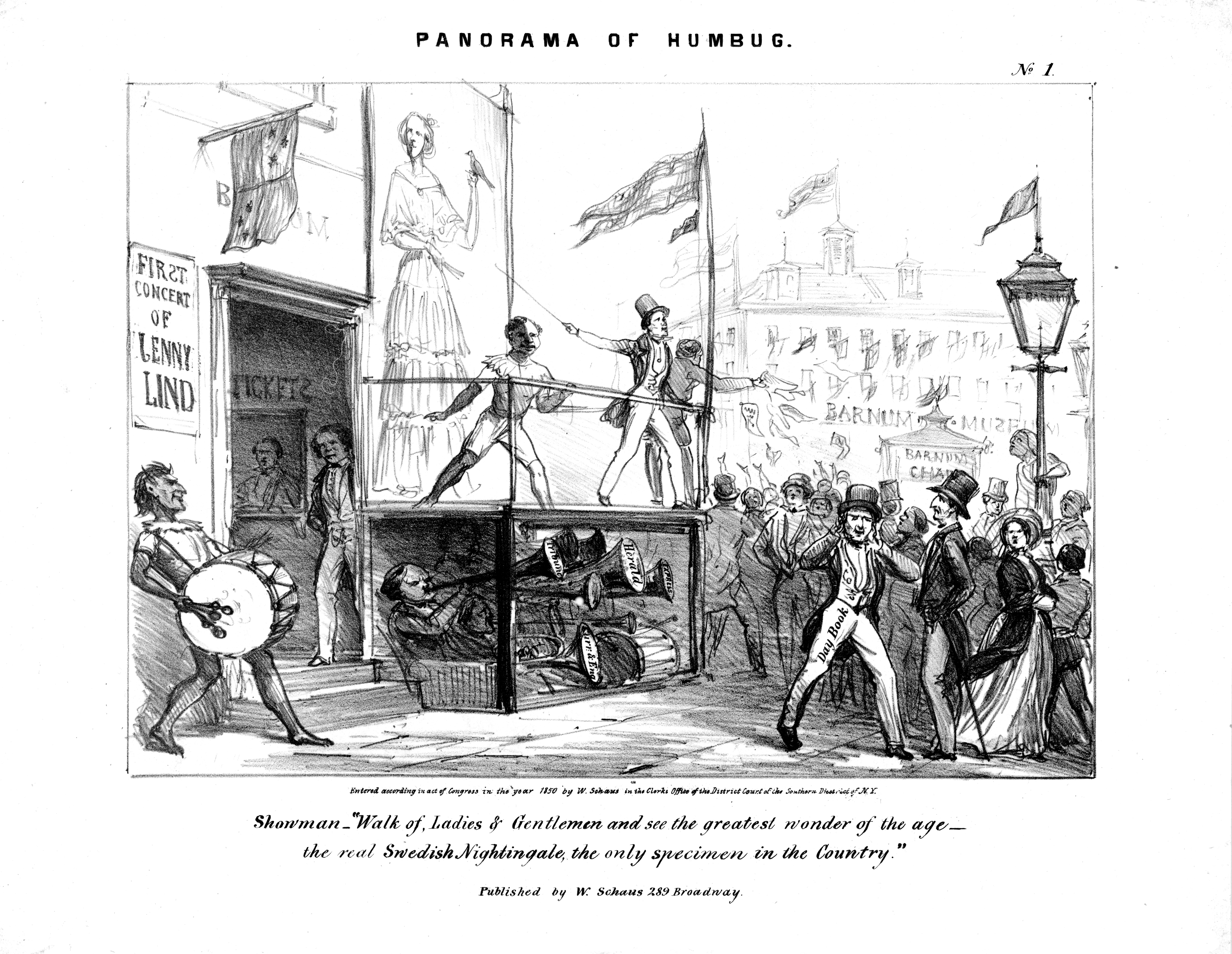
Panorama of Humbug. No. 1, making fun of Phineas T. Barnum and Jenny Lind LCCN 2004-665373

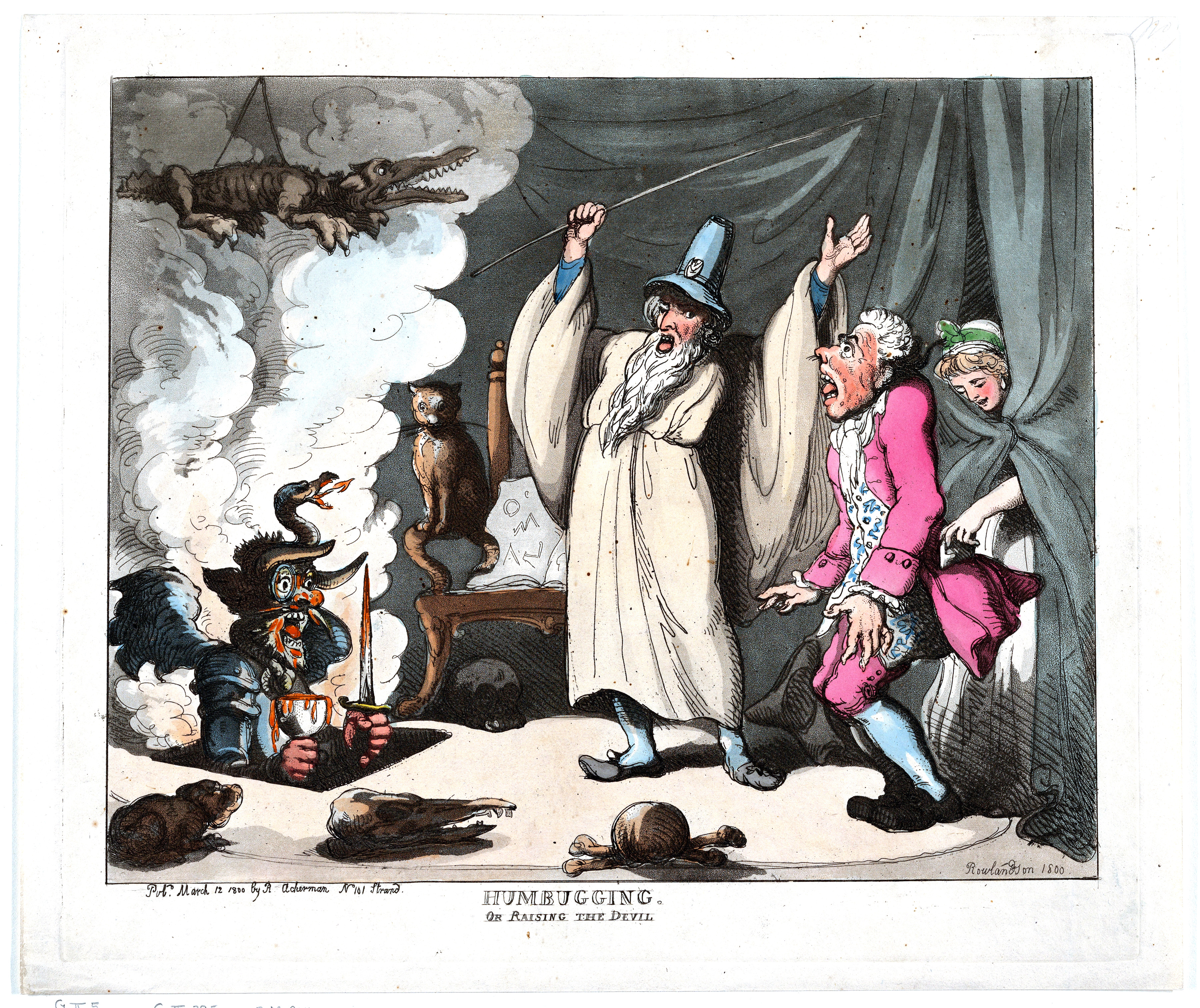
Humbugging, or raising the Devil, 1800. Rowlandson's humbugging depicts the public as a credulous simpleton being distracted by a display of "the miraculous", the better to have his pockets picked.

A humbug is a person or object that behaves in a deceptive or dishonest way, often as a hoax or in jest. The term was first described in 1751 as student slang, and recorded in 1840 as a "nautical phrase". It is now also often used as an exclamation to describe something as hypocritical nonsense or gibberish.

When referring to a person, a humbug means a fraud or impostor, implying an element of unjustified publicity and spectacle. In modern usage, the word is most associated with the character Ebenezer Scrooge, created by Charles Dickens in his 1843 novella A Christmas Carol. His famous reference to Christmas, "Bah! Humbug!", declaring Christmas to be a fraud, is commonly used in stage and screen versions and also appeared frequently in the original book. The word is also prominently used in the 1900 book The Wonderful Wizard of Oz, in which the Scarecrow refers to the Wizard of Oz as a humbug, and the Wizard agrees.

Another use of the word was by John Collins Warren, a Harvard Medical School professor who worked at Massachusetts General Hospital. On October 16, 1846, Dr. Warren performed the first public operation with the use of ether anesthesia, administered by William Thomas Green Morton, a dentist. To the stunned audience at the Massachusetts General Hospital, Warren declared, "Gentlemen, this is no humbug."

== Etymology ==
The oldest known written uses of the word are in the book The Student (1750–1751), ii. 41, where it is called "a word very much in vogue with the people of taste and fashion", and in Ferdinando Killigrew's The Universal Jester, subtitled "a choice collection of many conceits ... bon-mots and humbugs" from 1754.

There are many theories as to the origin of the term, none of which has been proven:

- Charles Godfrey Leland mentions the idea that the word could be derived from the Norse word hum, meaning 'night' or 'shadow', and the word bugges (used in the Bible), a variant of bogey, meaning 'apparitions'. From the other Scandinavian languages based on Old Norse, there are húm in Icelandic which means 'twilight'; hómi in Faroese which means 'unclear'; and humi in Old Swedish, which means 'dark suspicion', documented back to 1541. From this word is also derived the Swedish verb hymla, still in use, which means 'to conceal, hide, not commit to the truth'.
- According to the Dictionary of the Vulgar Tongue by Francis Grose, 1731–1791, 'to hum' in English indeed originally meant 'to deceive'. To combine this early medieval Scandinavian word with bugges from the English Bible of a later date may seem far-fetched. The word bug is derived from the Middle English bugge (of which the term bogey is also derived) which is in turn a cognate of the German word bögge (of which böggel-mann ('Goblin') is derived) and possibly the Norwegian dialect word bugge meaning "important man". The Welsh bwg ('ghost') could also be connected, and was thought in the past to be the origin of the English term, but more recent studies indicate that it is a borrowing from the much older Middle English word. Also, with bug meaning ghost or goblin, the use of the term applies in Dickens' novel about the Christmas ghosts. In A Concise Etymological Dictionary of the English Language of 1898, Walter Skeat also proposed a similar theory, although using contemporary versions of the words, where hum meant to murmur applause, and bug being a spectre.
- It could also come from the Italian uomo bugiardo, which literally means 'lying man'. There was considerable Italian influence on English at the time (e.g. William Shakespeare's numerous Italian-based plays, approximately 150 years before the first recorded use of 'humbug').
- Uim-bog is supposed to mean 'soft copper' in Irish, worthless money, but there is no evidence of a clear connection to the term.
- A modern conception is that it actually refers to a humming bug—i.e. something small and inconsequential, such as a cricket, that makes a lot of noise. In Norton Juster's novel The Phantom Tollbooth, there is a large beetle-like insect known as the Humbug, who is hardly ever right about anything.

The word has been used outside anglophone countries for well over a century. For instance, in Germany it has been known since the 1830s, in Sweden since at least 1862, in France since at least 1875, in Hungary, and in Finland.
