= 13 Queens Boulevard =

- Created by: Richard Baer
- Starring: Jerry Van Dyke; Eileen Brennan
- Composer: Barry De Vorzon
- Country of origin: United States
- Original language: English
- No. of seasons: 1
- No. of episodes: 9 (1 unaired)

Production
- Executive producers: Bud Yorkin; Bernie Orenstein; Saul Turteltaub
- Camera setup: Multi-camera
- Production company: TOY Productions

Original release
- Network: ABC
- Release: March 20 – July 24, 1979

13 Queens Boulevard is an American sitcom that aired from March 20 until July 24, 1979.

== Premise ==
The series was about the diverse residents of a Queens apartment complex.

The major residents of the complex were Felicia and Steven Winters (Eileen Brennan and Jerry Van Dyke) who have been happily married for over 15 years. Also living in the complex were Elaine Dowling (Marcia Rodd), a divorcee who was Felicia's best friend; and the Capestros, which included Mildred (Helen Page Camp) and her daughters, Annie (Susan Elliott) and Jill (Louise Williams). Others in the complex included Camille (Karen Rushmore) and Lois (Frances Lee McCain).

== Cast ==
- Eileen Brennan as Felicia Winters
- Jerry Van Dyke as Steven Winters
- Marcia Rodd as Elaine Dowling
- Helen Page Camp as Mildred Capestro
- Susan Elliot as Annie Capestro
- Louise Williams as Jill Capestro
- Karen Rushmore as Camille
- Frances Lee McCain as Lois

== Production ==
Richard Baer created the program; Bernie Orenstein, Saul Turteltaub, and Bud Yorkin developed it. Peter Baldwin, Nancy Walker, Kim Friedman, and Will MacKenzie directed. Writers were Orenstein, Turteltaub, Baer, Linda Marsh, Martin Rips, and Mitzi McCall.

== Episodes ==
No.	Title	Directed by	Written by	Original release date
1	"For Better or Worse"	Kim Friedman	Margie Peters, Linda Marsh	March 20, 1979
On their 15th anniversary, Steven announces that he is transferring to Ohio.
2	"Reunion"	Kim Friedman	Martin Rips, Joseph Staretski	March 27, 1979
Elaine doesn't want to go to her 20th high school reunion because she might run into her ex-husband.
3	"No Room at the Top"	Will Mackenzie	Margie Peters, Martin Rips, Joseph Staretski	April 3, 1979
Elaine gets a job that seemed perfect for Felicia's husband.
4	"The Younger Man"	Nancy Walker	Anne Convy, Mitzi McCall	April 10, 1979
Elaine has an affair with a 23-year-old man.
5	"Playing Around"	Will Mackenzie	Saul Turteltaub, Bernie Orenstein	April 17, 1979
Felicia's friends see Steven at a night club with a woman.
6	"Thoroughly Modern Mildred"	Peter Baldwin	Richard Baer	July 3, 1979
Mildred spends the night with a guy she met at a party.
7	"Italian Holiday"	Kim Friedman	Linda Marsh	July 17, 1979
Felicia wants to resume an affair with an Italian she met 20 years ago.
8	"Like Mother, Like Son"	Kim Friedman	Saul Turteltaub, Bernie Orenstein	July 24, 1979
Lois' ex-husband wants custody of their son because he doesn't think the upbringing is macho enough.
9	"The Lift"	Nancy Walker	Martin Rips, Joseph Staretski	Unaired
