= Marcia Rodd =

American actress (1938–2025)

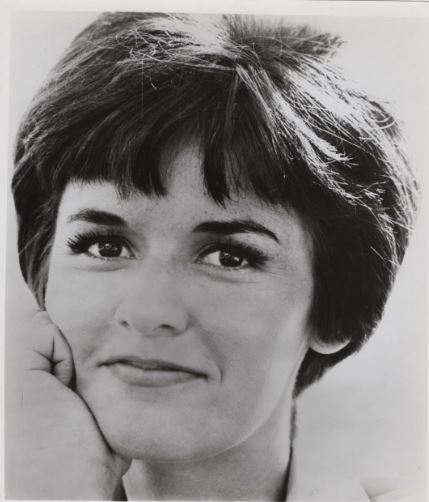
- Rodd, 1970s promotional photo
- Born: July 8, 1938; Lyons, Kansas, U.S.
- Died: December 27, 2025 (aged 87); Los Angeles, California, U.S.
- Occupations: Actress, singer, director
- Years active: 1962–2023
- Known for: Little Murders; Shelter; Handle with Care; Last of the Red Hot Lovers
- Spouse: Dale Hagen (m. 1960; div. 1978)

Marcia Rodd (July 8, 1938 – December 27, 2025) was an American actress, singer and director. After studying theatre at Northwestern University, she moved to New York City and began a successful career as a stage actress.

Rodd was nominated for the Tony Award for Best Actress in a Musical in 1973 for her performance in the musical Shelter. In 1964, she starred as Dorothy Gale in a televised production of The Wizard of Oz. She made her film debut in Alan Arkin's 1971 film Little Murders, and received acclaim for her role as Portland Angel in Jonathan Demme's Handle with Care (1977). In 1969, she originated the role of Bobbi in Neil Simon's Last of the Red Hot Lovers.

== Early years ==
Rodd was born in Lyons, Kansas, on July 8, 1938. She was the daughter of Charles and Rosetta (née Thran) Rodd. Her father was an oil company executive. She has a brother, Stephen Rodd, a lawyer, and a sister, Barbara. For most of her youth, Rodd and her family lived in Tulsa. They moved to Wichita in time for her to attend East High School for her senior year. She also worked part-time at a store. She studied drama at Northwestern University, under the tutelage of Alvina Krause. She married Dale Hagen and followed him to New Haven, Connecticut where he enrolled in Yale Law School and she performed in Yale Repertory Theatre. The couple then moved to New York City.

== Career ==
Rodd spent the 1960s and 1970s appearing on and off Broadway. She made her Broadway debut in late 1964 as a replacement in the musical Oh, What a Lovely War, assuming the roles played by Linda Loftis. In 1966, she appeared as a replacement in the off-Broadway musical The Mad Show, and replaced Marian Mercer as Olivia in Your Own Thing, a musical adaptation of Shakespeare's Twelfth Night, one week after it opened off-Broadway in January 1968. She appeared in Norman Krasna's short-lived Broadway comedy Love in E Flat in 1967. From December 1969 to March 1971, Rodd performed in Neil Simon's The Last of the Red Hot Lovers on Broadway opposite Linda Lavin, Doris Roberts, and James Coco. Her portrayal of Maud in the Broadway musical Shelter garnered her a Tony Award nomination for Best Actress in a Musical in 1973. She lost to Glynis Johns for A Little Night Music.

In 1971, she appeared in the film T.R. Baskin with Candice Bergen, and the black comedy Little Murders opposite Elliott Gould. Her other film credits included Handle with Care (1977) and Last Embrace (1979).

During the 1970s, she appeared in several made-for-television productions, and continued making appearances on television shows through the next three decades. One of these appearances was in the episode of All in the Family that served as the pilot for the series Maude in the role of Maude's daughter Carol Traynor, who was eventually played by Adrienne Barbeau in the series. She had also played another character on a previous All in the Family episode, "Mike's Mysterious Son", earlier that same season. Other guest appearances on television included M*A*S*H, Match Game '76, Murder, She Wrote, The New Dick Van Dyke Show and a recurring role as Stanley Riverside's wife on Trapper John, M.D.

In 1978, she starred as the ingenue Cynthia Carter in the short-lived stage musical Barbary Coast.

Rodd portrayed Elaine Dowling in the TV series 13 Queens Boulevard in 1979.

She returned to Broadway in the mid-1980s, as a replacement for the role of Clara in Herb Gardner's I'm Not Rappaport. In 1989 and 1994, she starred in two separate national tours of Fiddler on the Roof, as Golde opposite both Theodore Bikel and Topol as Tevye, respectively.

She also appeared in a 2003 episode of the television series Without a Trace, the 2012 short film Parallax, and the long-running soap opera The Young and the Restless.

== Death ==
Rodd died on December 27, 2025, at the age of 87.

== Filmography ==
=== Film ===
Year	Title	Role	Notes
1971	Little Murders	Patsy Newquist	
1971	T.R. Baskin	Dayle Wigoda	
1972	VD Blues	Woman	
1977	Handle with Care	Portland Angel	Nominated — National Society of Film Critics Award for Best Supporting Actress
1979	Last Embrace	Adrian	
1994	The Scout	Mrs. Lacy	
1997	Mulligans!	Madge	Short
1998	The Scottish Tale	Sarah	
2000	Wanted	Mama Scrico	
2012	Parallax	Cassandra	Short
2015	Shining Seas	Maria	Short
2015	Broken: A Musical	Judge	
2016	Road to the Wall	Barb	
2019	American Christmas	Martha	

=== Television ===
Year	Title	Role	Notes
1971	The New Dick Van Dyke Show	Linda	"Linda, Linda, Linda"
1972	Young Dr. Kildare	Dr. Nicole Keefe	"Chemistry of Anger"
1972	Medical Center	Connie	"The Torn Man"
1972	All in the Family	Marilyn Sanders / Carol Traynor	"Mike's Mysterious Son", "Maude"
1975	Medical Center	Phyllis	"The Captives"
1975	Barnaby Jones	Nurse Marion Hollister	"Fatal Witness"
1976	The Dumplings	Stephanie	Regular role
1976	Good Heavens	Joanne	"Coffee, Tea, or Gloria"
1976	How to Break Up a Happy Divorce	Eve	TV film
1977	Phyllis	Joanne Valenti	"Dan's Ex"
1977	All's Fair	Vanessa Farr	"The Dick and Vanessa Show"
1977	Maude	Leslie Perkins	"Walter's Temptation"
1978	M*A*S*H	Nurse Lorraine Anderson	"Temporary Duty"
1979	13 Queens Boulevard	Elaine Dowling	Main role
1979	ABC Afterschool Special	Barbara McKain	"A Movie Star's Daughter"
1979	Quincy, M.E.	Eleanor Janssen	"Sweet Land of Liberty"
1979	Lou Grant	Nancy Rhoden	"Samaritan"
1980	Archie Bunker's Place	Allison Flanders	"Home Again"
1980	Insight	Pat McGinn / Kay Durban	"Unfinished Business", "God in the Dock"
1980–86	Trapper John, M.D.	E.J. Riverside	Recurring role
1981	Flamingo Road	Alice Kovacs	Recurring role
1981	Maggie	Miss Turley	"The School Conference"
1981	Bret Maverick	Capt. Estelle Slater	"The Yellow Rose"
1982	Laverne & Shirley	Hillary	"The Playboy Show"
1982	Lou Grant	Vivian Hamlin	"Cameras"
1983	American Playhouse	Mary Goodwin	"Keeping On"
1984	Night Court	Nora Bowers Sedgwick	"Hi Honey, I'm Home"
1984	The Four Seasons	Claudia Zimmer	13 episodes
1984	Gimme a Break!	Off. Dwyer	"Carl's Delicate Moment"
1985	Highway to Heaven	Ann Haynes	"The Right Thing"
1985	Too Close for Comfort	Margaret Sinclair	"Off and Running"
1985	Between the Darkness and the Dawn	Lilly	TV film
1987	Buck James	Sara Taylor	"A Question of Loyalty"
1986	Murder, She Wrote	Betty Fiddler	"Keep the Home Fires Burning"
1987–89	21 Jump Street	Margaret Hanson	"After School Special", "Christmas in Saigon", "Loc'd Out: Part 2"
1988	Murder, She Wrote	Madeline DeHaven	"Harbinger of Death"
1990	Hunter	Miss Doyle	"Oh, the Shark Bites!"
1994	Renegade	Judge Joan Stephens	"Once Burned, Twice Chey"
1995	Home Improvement	Barbara Burton	"Doctor in the House"
1996	Sisters	Jane Wilcott Sumner	"Housecleaning"
2000	Family Law	Susan Lumberg	"Telling Lies"
2001–02	Family Law	Judge Paula Scott	"Recovery", "Celano v. Foster"
2003	Without a Trace	Sandra Pappish	"Moving On"
2012	Treelore Theatre	Granny Gilly	"Memory Lane Diner"
2013–14	Broken at Love	Grandma Lulu	"Post-Match Analysis", "Sudden Death"
2014	Hellman v. McCarthy	Mary McCarthy	TV film
2017	The Young and the Restless	Myrna Bloodworth	2 episodes
2020	Grey's Anatomy	Gertie Schmitt	Episode: "The Last Supper"
2023	Hunters	Helga Hansöm	"The Home"
