= T.R. Baskin =

1971 film by Herbert Ross

- Original poster
- Directed by: Herbert Ross
- Written by: Peter Hyams
- Produced by: Peter Hyams
- Starring: Candice Bergen; Peter Boyle; Marcia Rodd; James Caan
- Cinematography: Gerald Hirschfeld
- Edited by: Maury Winetrobe
- Music by: Jack Elliott
- Production company: Paramount Pictures
- Distributed by: Paramount Pictures
- Release date: October 20, 1971
- Running time: 90 minutes
- Country: United States
- Language: English

T.R. Baskin (released as A Date with a Lonely Girl in the United Kingdom) is a 1971 American romantic drama film directed by Herbert Ross, written and produced by Peter Hyams, and starring Candice Bergen, Peter Boyle, Marcia Rodd and James Caan.

== Plot ==
One Sunday afternoon, Jack Mitchell, a married middle-aged salesman from Utica, New York, meets his old friend, children's book author Larry Moore, while on business in Chicago. After asking if Larry knows any "girls" in town, Jack is given the phone number of T.R. Baskin, a socially isolated and sarcastic young woman who has moved to Chicago "to seek fame and fortune," in her own words. Jack calls T.R. and invites her to visit him at his hotel. T.R. arrives at the hotel, and after some awkward conversation, they finally get into bed, but Jack is unable to perform, causing her to laugh uncontrollably. She eventually begins to tell Jack about her life in Chicago up to that point, shown via flashbacks.

After flying to Chicago from Findlay, Ohio and informing her parents of her absence via telegram, T.R. first checks into a room at the local YWCA and then moves into a run-down studio apartment, as it is all she can afford. She finds employment as a typist in a large corporation, where she meets and befriends Dayle Wigoda, who arranges a double-date for them. The man she is set up with proves to be a bigot and misogynist, and after ending the date by directly insulting him, T.R. begins to spend her evenings in her apartment alone.

One night, after leaving a crowded bar, T.R. notices a man, Larry, reading a book through the window of a café. Joining him at his table, the two quickly become friendly and go back to his apartment. The two discuss their lives and regrets, and she spends the night with him. The next morning, T.R. discovers Larry has put a $20 bill in her coat pocket, having mistaken her for a sex worker. Feeling betrayed and humiliated, she runs out of his apartment and wanders the desolated early morning streets. Returning to her apartment, she calls her parents, who are implied to be furious with her decision to move to Chicago; she apologizes to them profusely and breaks down in tears.

Back in Jack's hotel room, T.R. frankly discusses the ways city life has affected her, while Jack reveals his desire to retire to small-town Florida. Jack offers to see her again, but she declines, seemingly having reached an understanding with him. The two share a friendly hug before she leaves, and T.R. walks off into the bustling Chicago streets.

== Cast ==
- Candice Bergen as T.R. Baskin
- Peter Boyle as Jack Mitchell
- James Caan as Larry Moore
- Marcia Rodd as Dayle Wigoda
- Howard Platt as Arthur

== Production ==
The film was shot in various locations around Chicago, including the Carson Pirie Scott department store, the Sherman House Hotel, the First National Bank Building, and O'Connell's Coffee Shop on Rush Street.

Herbert Ross later stated, "I made a terrible mistake on T.R. Baskin. I was fooled by the script. I discovered in working on the script that it was like quicksand: the harder we worked, the more we investigated, the more damage we did. So after a while we were just trying to mask the flaws. It was a very salutary experience, because it helped me to learn how to evaluate a script."

== Critical response ==
The film was negatively received by critics on its original release. On the review aggregator website Rotten Tomatoes, 0% of 6 critics' reviews are positive, with an average rating of 4/10.

In the Chicago Sun-Times, critic Roger Ebert gave the film 2 (out of 4) stars, writing:

T.R. Baskin is supposed to be about the human waste caused by depersonalization, I guess, and about how love and a moment of communication can make things better. But the movie itself is concocted of cliches about depersonalization; the cure is as bad as the disease.

== Home video and reappraisal ==
T.R. Baskin was unavailable on home video for many years until 2023, when a 4K remaster of the film prepared by Paramount was released on Blu-ray by Fun City Editions. This brought the film renewed praise from some critics, with a writer for Under the Radar calling it "a stirring portrayal of spiraling depression."

== See also ==
- List of American films of 1971
