= Bark, George =

1999 picture book by Jules Feiffer

- Author: Jules Feiffer
- Illustrator: Jules Feiffer
- Cover artist: Jules Feiffer
- Language: English
- Subject: Humor
- Genre: Children's literature, picture book
- Publisher: Michael di Capua Books;
- Publication date: 1999
- Publication place: United States
- English publication date: June 3, 1999
- Media type: Hardcover
- Pages: 32
- ISBN: 9780062051868
- Preceded by: I Lost My Bear
- Followed by: Smart George

Bark, George is a 1999 children's book written and illustrated by author, cartoonist and playwright Jules Feiffer, and published by Michael di Capua Books. It was later adapted into an animated short film by Weston Woods Studios, in 2003, with the narrator being John Lithgow. It was listed as ninth overall in a list of the "Top 100 Picture Books" of all time in a 2012 poll by School Library Journal. The book is about the titular character, a young dog who cannot bark.

== History ==
Jules Feiffer explained that he had the idea for the story that became "Bark, George" when he told it to his young daughter, Julie, as an impromptu bedtime story which she did not find funny.

The book’s sequel, ‘’Smart George’’, was published more than 20 years after the original was released. Feiffer said he intended to publish a sequel within two years of ‘’Bark, George’’ being released, and, “It was never far from my mind, as the years went by and I had no luck in coming up with any ideas, that someday, somehow, George would make a comeback. He was one of my favorite characters.”

== Plot ==
The book tells the story of a puppy named George. George cannot bark in the conventional way dogs are innately able to bark. When George's mother asks him to bark, George responds with “meow” and then several other animal sounds. George's mother takes him to a veterinarian where the reader discovers George has swallowed several different kinds of animals, which the veterinarian extracts one by one.

The story has drawn comparisons to the nursery rhyme “There Was an Old Lady Who Swallowed a Fly”.

== Reception ==
The book debuted on the Los Angeles Times bestsellers list in September 1999. The New York Times described Bark, George as, “a charming bedtime standby” in 2008.

== See also ==
- 1999 in literature
- List of animal sounds
