= Jules Feiffer =

American cartoonist and author (1929–2025)

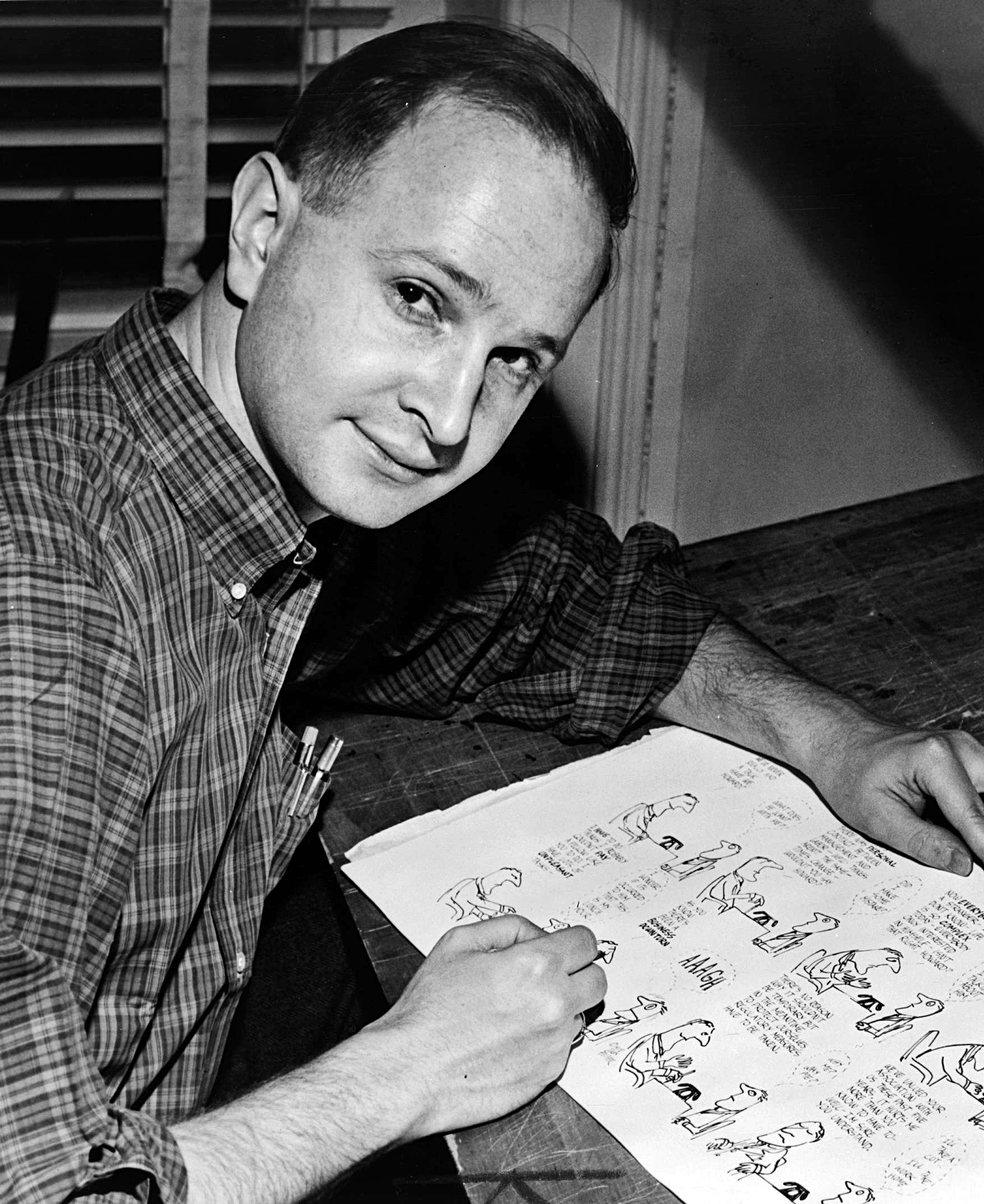
- Feiffer in 1958
- Born: January 26, 1929 New York City, U.S.
- Died: January 17, 2025 (aged 95) Richfield Springs, New York, U.S.
- Areas: Cartoonist; author; playwright; screenwriter
- Notable works: Carnal Knowledge; Little Murders; Munro; The Phantom Tollbooth
- Awards: Pulitzer Prize (1986); Inkpot Award (1989); Comic Book Hall of Fame (2004)
- Spouses: Judith Sheftel (m. 1961; div. 1983); Jennifer Allen (m. 1983; div. 2014); JZ Holden (m. 2016)
- Children: 3, including Halley

Jules Ralph Feiffer (/ˈfaɪfər/ FY-fər; January 26, 1929 – January 17, 2025) was an American cartoonist and author, who at one time was considered the most widely read satirist in the country. He won the Pulitzer Prize in 1986 for editorial cartooning and, in 2004, Feiffer was inducted into the Comic Book Hall of Fame. He wrote the animated short Munro, which won an Academy Award for Best Animated Short Film in 1961. The Library of Congress has recognized Feiffer's "remarkable legacy", from 1946 to the present, as a cartoonist, playwright, screenwriter, adult and children's book author, illustrator, and art instructor.

When Feiffer was 17 (in the mid-1940s), he became assistant to cartoonist Will Eisner. There, he helped Eisner write and illustrate his comic strips, including The Spirit. In 1956, Feiffer became a staff cartoonist at The Village Voice, where he produced the weekly comic strip titled Feiffer until 1997. Feiffer's cartoons became nationally syndicated in 1959 and then appeared regularly in publications including the Los Angeles Times, the London Observer, The New Yorker, Playboy, Esquire, and The Nation. In 1997, he created the first op-ed page comic strip for The New York Times, which ran monthly until 2000.

Feiffer wrote more than 35 books, plays, and screenplays. His first of many collections of satirical cartoons, Sick, Sick, Sick, was published in 1958, and his first novel, Harry, the Rat With Women, in 1963. In 1965, Feiffer wrote The Great Comic Book Heroes, the first history of the comic-book superheroes of the late 1930s and early 1940s and a tribute to their creators. In 1979, he created his first graphic novel, Tantrum. By 1993, Feiffer began writing and illustrating books aimed at young readers, with several of them winning awards.

Feiffer began writing for the theater and film in 1961, with plays including Little Murders (1967), Feiffer's People (1969), and Knock Knock (1976). He wrote the screenplay for Carnal Knowledge (1971), directed by Mike Nichols, and Popeye (1980), directed by Robert Altman. At the time of his death, Feiffer was working on a visual memoir.

== Early life ==
Feiffer was born in The Bronx, New York City, on January 26, 1929. His parents were David Feiffer and Rhoda (née Davis), and Feiffer was raised in a Jewish household in the Soundview neighborhood with a younger and an older sister. David was usually unemployed in his work as a salesman due to the Depression, while Rhoda was a fashion designer who made watercolor drawings of her designs which she sold to various clothing manufacturers in New York. "She'd go door to door selling her designs for $3," recalled Feiffer. However, the fact that she was the breadwinner created an "atmosphere of silent blame" in the home. Feiffer began drawing at age three. "My mother always encouraged me to draw," he said.

When Feiffer was 13, his mother gave him a drawing table for his bedroom. She also enrolled Feiffer in the Art Students League of New York to study anatomy. He graduated from James Monroe High School in 1947. Feiffer won a John Wanamaker Art Contest medal for a crayon drawing of the radio Western hero Tom Mix. He wrote in 1965 about his childhood:

I came to the field with a more serious intent than my opiate-minded contemporaries. While they, in those pre-super days, were eating up "Cosmo, Master of Disguise"; "Speed Saunders"; and "Bart Regan Spy", I was counting up how many panels there were to a page, how many pages there were to a story – learning how to form, for my own use, phrases like: @X#?/; marking for future reference which comic book hero was swiped from which radio hero: Buck Marshall from Tom Mix; the Crimson Avenger from The Green Hornet ...

Feiffer said that cartoons were his first interest when young, "what I loved the most." Feiffer stated that because he could not write well enough to be a writer, or draw well enough to be an artist, he realized that the best way to succeed would be to combine his limited talents in each of those fields to create something unique. Feiffer read comic strips from various newspapers which his father brought home, and he was attracted mostly to the way they told stories. "What I loved best about these comics was that they created a very personal world in which almost anything could take place," Feiffer said. "And readers would accept it even if it had nothing to do with any other kind of world. It was the fantasy world I loved."

Among Feiffer's favorite cartoons were Our Boarding House, Alley Oop and Wash Tubbs. He began to decipher features of different cartoonists, such as the sentimental naturalism of Abbie an' Slats, the [Preston] Sturges-like characters and plots of others, with cadenced dialogue. Feiffer recalls that Will Eisner's Spirit rivaled them in structure, and no strip, except [Milton] Caniff's Terry [and the Pirates], rivaled it in atmosphere."

== Career ==
=== Cartoonist ===
==== With Will Eisner (1946–1956) ====
Our fights were always collegial. Never once did [Eisner] pull rank on me. I was always amazed by what he let me get away with. It shows how close and tight the relationship was, that he let me do that parody. He had great generosity of soul.

— Jules Feiffer

After Feiffer graduated from high school at 16, he was desperate for a job, and went unannounced to the office of one of his favorite cartoonists, Will Eisner. Eisner was sympathetic to young Feiffer, as Eisner had been in a similar situation when he first started out. Eisner asked Feiffer, "What can you do?" He answered, "I'll do anything. I'll do coloring, or clean-up, or anything, and I'd like to work for nothing." However, Eisner was unimpressed by Feiffer's art abilities and did not know how he could employ him. Eisner ultimately decided to give him a low-paying job when he found out that Feiffer "knew more about him than anybody who had ever lived," said Feiffer. "He had no choice but to hire me as a groupie."

Eisner considered Feiffer a mediocre artist, but he "liked the kid's spunk and intensity", writes Eisner biographer Michael Schumacher. Eisner was also aware that they both came from similar backgrounds, despite his being 12 years older. They both had fathers who struggled to support their family, and both their mothers were strong figures who held the family together through hardships. "He had a hunger for comics that Eisner rarely saw in artists", notes Schumacher. "Eisner decided that there was something to this wisecracking kid." When Feiffer later asked for a raise, Eisner instead gave him his own page in The Spirit section and let him do his own coloring. As Eisner recalled in 1978:

He began working as just a studio man – he would do erasing, cleanup ... Gradually it became very clear that he could write better than he could draw and preferred it, indeed – so he wound up doing balloons [i.e., dialog]. First he was doing balloons based on stories that I'd create. I would start a story off and say, 'Now here I want the Spirit to do the following things – you do the balloons, Jules.' Gradually, he would take over and do stories entirely on his own, generally based on ideas we'd talked about. I'd come in generally with the first page, then he would pick it up and carry it from there.

They collaborated well on The Spirit, sharing ideas, arguing points, and making changes when they agreed. In 1947, Feiffer also attended the Pratt Institute for a year to improve his art style. Over time, Eisner valued Feiffer's opinions and judgments more often, appreciating his "uncanny knack" for capturing the way people talked, without using contrived dialogue. Eisner recalls that Feiffer "had a real ear for writing characters that lived and breathed. Jules was always attentive to nuances, such as sounds and expressions" which made stories seem more real.

==== At The Village Voice (1956–1997) ====
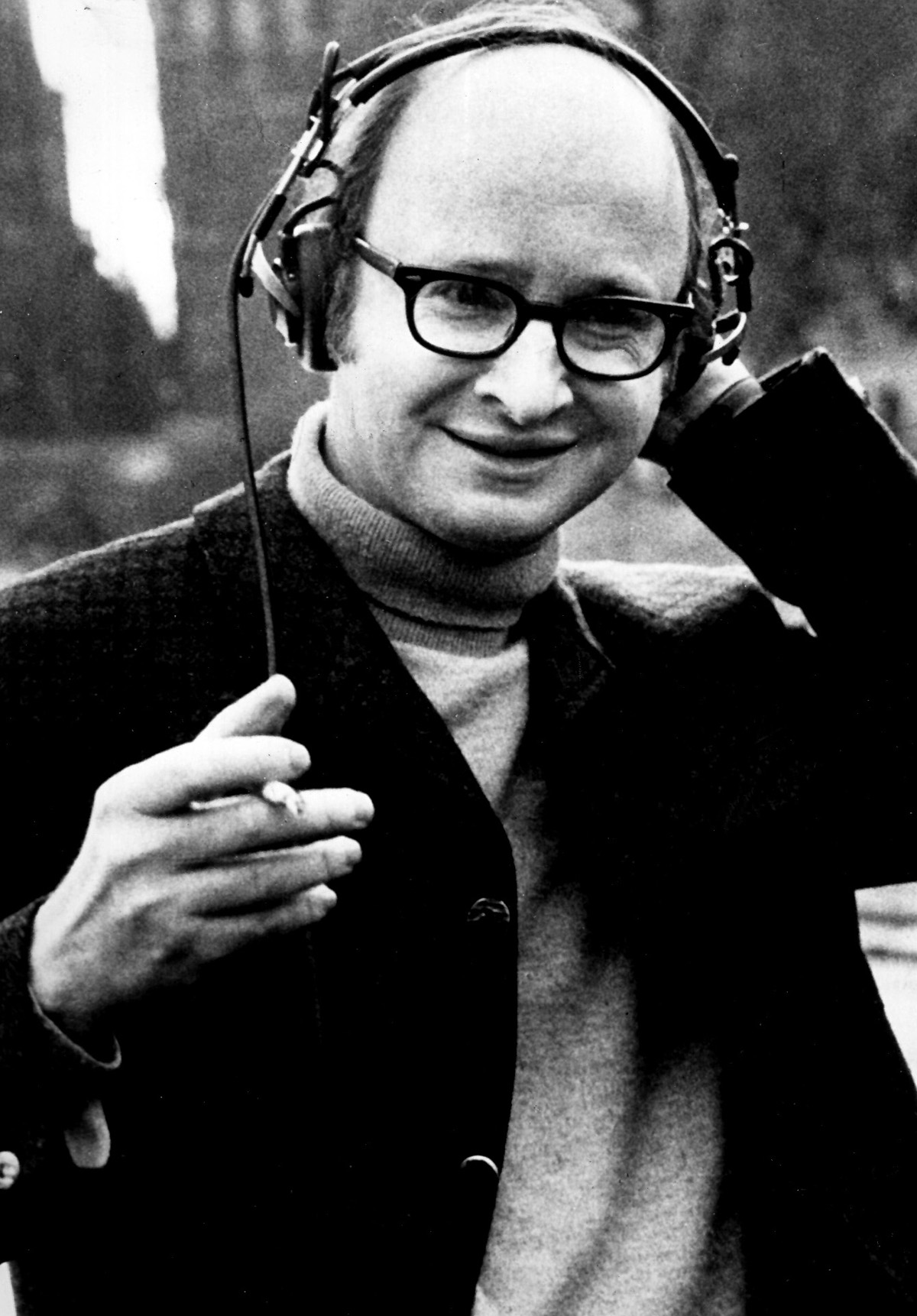
1976 candid

Feiffer comic strip (1959)

After working with Eisner for nearly a decade, Feiffer chose to start creating his own comic strips. In 1956, after again first proving his talent by working for free, Feiffer became a staff cartoonist at The Village Voice, where he produced a weekly comic strip. Feiffer's strips ran until 1997, at first titled Sick Sick Sick, then as Feiffer's Fables, and finally as simply Feiffer. After a year with the Voice, Feiffer compiled a collection of many of his satire cartoons into a best-selling book, Sick Sick Sick: A Guide to Non-Confident Living (1958), a dissection of popular social and political neuroses. The success of that collection led to his becoming a regular contributor to the London Observer and Playboy magazine. Director Stanley Kubrick, a fellow Bronx native, invited Feiffer to write a screenplay for Sick, Sick, Sick, although the film was never made. After first becoming aware of Feiffer's work, Kubrick wrote him in 1958:

The comic themes you weave are very close to my heart ... I must express unqualified admiration for the scenic structure of your "strips" and the eminently speakable and funny dialog ... I should be most interested in furthering our contact with an eye toward doing a film along the moods and themes you have so brilliantly accomplished.

By April 1959, Feiffer was distributed nationally by the Hall Syndicate, initially in The Boston Globe, Minneapolis Star Tribune, Newark Star-Ledger and Long Island Press. Eventually, his strips covered the nation, including magazines, and were published regularly in major publications such as the Los Angeles Times, The New Yorker, Esquire, Playboy and The Nation. Feiffer was commissioned in 1997 by The New York Times to create its first op-ed page comic strip, which ran monthly until 2000.

Feiffer's cartoons were typically mini-satires, where he portrayed ordinary people's thoughts about subjects such as sex, marriage, violence and politics. Writer Larry DuBois describes Feiffer's cartoon style:

Feiffer had no stories to tell. His main concern was to explore character. In a series of a dozen or so pictures, he would show the shifts of mood that flickered across the faces of men and women as they tried, often vainly, to explain themselves to the world, to their husbands and wives, to their mistresses and lovers, to their employers, to their rulers, or simply to the unseen adversaries at the other end of the telephone wires ... It would be no exaggeration to say that his dialog is as acute as any that is being written in America today. Dialog aimed at sophisticated minds, usually with the purpose of shaking them out of sophistication into real awareness.

=== Author ===
Feiffer's post-nomination Obama cartoon from The Village Voice (2008)

Feiffer's ad art for the Beat musical The Nervous Set (1959)

Feiffer published the hit Sick, Sick, Sick: A Guide to Non-Confident Living in 1958 (which featured a collection of cartoons from about 1950 to 1956), and followed up with More Sick, Sick, Sick and other strip collections, including The Explainers; Boy, Girl. Boy, Girl.; Hold Me!; Feiffer's Album; The Unexpurgated Memoirs of Bernard Mergendeiler; Feiffer on Nixon; Jules Feiffer's America: From Eisenhower to Reagan; Marriage Is an Invasion of Privacy; and Feiffer's Children. Passionella (1957) is a graphic narrative initially anthologized in Passionella and Other Stories, a variation on the story of Cinderella. The protagonist, Ella, is a chimney sweep who is transformed into a Hollywood movie star. Passionella was used as one part of the 1966 Sheldon Harnick and Jerry Bock Broadway musical The Apple Tree.

Feiffer's cartoons, strips and illustrations have been reprinted by Fantagraphics as Feiffer: The Collected Works. Explainers (2008) reprints all of his strips from 1956 to 1966. David Kamp reviewed the book in The New York Times:

His strip, usually six to eight borderless panels, initially appeared under the title Sick Sick Sick, with the subtitle 'A Guide to Non-Confident Living'. As the Lenny Bruce-ish language suggests, the earliest strips are very much of their time, the postwar Age of Anxiety in the big city; you can practically smell the espresso, the unfiltered ciggies, the lanolin whiff of woolly jumpers.

Feiffer has written two novels (1963's Harry the Rat with Women, 1977's Ackroyd) and several children's books, including Bark, George; Henry, The Dog with No Tail; A Room with a Zoo; The Daddy Mountain; and A Barrel of Laughs, a Vale of Tears. He partnered with The Walt Disney Company and writer Andrew Lippa to adapt his book The Man in the Ceiling into a musical. Feiffer illustrated the children's books The Phantom Tollbooth and The Odious Ogre. His non-fiction includes the 1965 book The Great Comic Book Heroes.

I want to write about marriage. I think the most interesting story is how men and women get on with each other, the terms they accept to live together and survive together, the compromises they make, the betrayals of themselves and of each other, and how, despite the fact that over and over again they find that it can't possibly work, it still seems to be preferable to anything else they know about. In the end, it becomes rather heroic.

— Jules Feiffer, Playboy interview

Feiffer also wrote and drew one of the earliest graphic novels, the hardcover Tantrum (Alfred A. Knopf, 1979), described on its dustjacket as a "novel-in-pictures". Like the trade paperback The Silver Surfer (Simon & Schuster/Fireside Books, August 1978), by Marvel Comics' Stan Lee and Jack Kirby, and the hardcover and trade paperback versions of Will Eisner's A Contract with God, and Other Tenement Stories (Baronet Books, October 1978), this was published by a traditional book publisher and distributed through bookstores, whereas other early graphic novels, such as Sabre (Eclipse Books, August 1978), were distributed through some of the first comic-book stores.

Feiffer's autobiography, Backing into Forward: A Memoir (Doubleday, 2010), received positive reviews from The New York Times and Publishers Weekly, which wrote:

His account of hitchhiking cross-country invades Kerouac territory, while his ink-stained memories of the comics industry rival Michael Chabon's Pulitzer Prize–winning fictional portrait. Feiffer was drafted into the U.S. Army in 1951 during the Korean War, where he did animation for the Signal Corps. His two years in the military gave Feiffer fodder for the trenchant Munro (about a child who is drafted). Such satirical social and political commentary became the turning point in his lust for fame, which finally happened, after many rejections, when acclaim for his anxiety-ridden Village Voice strips served as a springboard into other projects.

Feiffer has had retrospectives at the New York Historical Society, the Library of Congress and The School of Visual Arts. His artwork is exhibited at and represented by Chicago's Jean Albano Gallery. In 1996, Feiffer donated his papers and several hundred original cartoons and book illustrations to the Library of Congress.

In 2014, Feiffer published Kill My Mother: A Graphic Novel through Liveright Publishing, which was named a Vanity Fair Best Book of 2014 and a Kirkus Reviews Best Fiction Book of 2014. Research assistants provided period detail for the story's 1930s and 40s settings, and Feiffer himself studied stills from Turner Classic Movies in order to "re-create the look of noir". In 2016, Feiffer published Cousin Joseph: A Graphic Novel, a prequel to Kill My Mother. Cousin Joseph was also published through Liveright Publishing, and was a New York Times Bestseller, named one of The Washington Post's Best Graphic Novels of the Year, and was nominated for the Lynd Ward Graphic Novel Prize. A third book in the series, The Ghost Script: A Graphic Novel, was published by Liveright in 2018.

Feiffer's picture book for young readers, Rupert Can Dance, was published by FSG in 2014.

=== Playwright and screenwriter ===
Feiffer's plays include Little Murders (1967), Feiffer's People (1969), Knock Knock (1976), Elliot Loves (1990), The White House Murder Case, and Grown Ups. After Mike Nichols adapted Feiffer's unproduced play Carnal Knowledge as a 1971 film, Feiffer scripted Robert Altman's Popeye, Alain Resnais's I Want to Go Home, and the film adaptation of Little Murders.

The original production of Hold Me! was directed by Caymichael Patten and opened at The American Place Theatre, Subplot Cafe, as part of its American Humorist Series on January 13, 1977. The production ran on the Showtime cable network in 1981.

Feiffer moved to Shelter Island, New York in 2017. He wrote the book for a musical based on a story he wrote earlier, Man in the Ceiling, about a boy cartoonist who learned to pursue his dream despite pressures to conform. The musical was produced and directed by Jeffrey Seller in 2017 at the Bay Street Theatre in neighboring Sag Harbor, New York.

=== Art instructor ===
Feiffer was an adjunct professor at Stony Brook Southampton. Previously, he taught at the Yale School of Drama and Northwestern University. Feiffer has been a Senior Fellow at the Columbia University National Arts Journalism Program. He was in residence at the Arizona State University Barrett Honors College from November 27 to December 2, 2006. During the summer of 2009, Feiffer was in residence as a Montgomery Fellow at Dartmouth College, where he taught an undergraduate course on graphic humor in the 20th century.

== Personal life ==
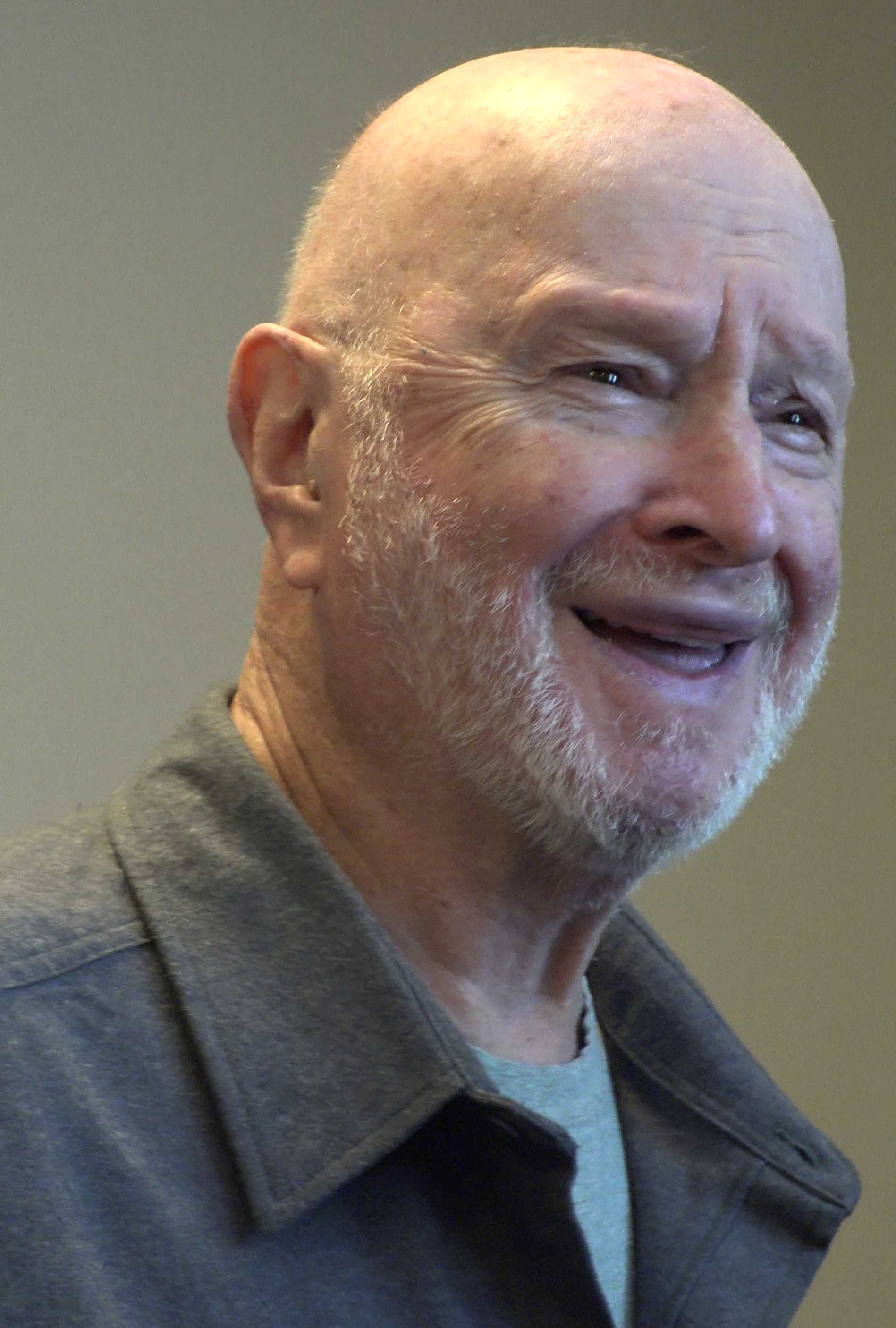
Feiffer laughing during a panel at Butler Library at Columbia University in 2016

Feiffer was married thrice and had three children. His daughter, Kate Feiffer, is the author and playwright of My Mom Is Trying to Ruin My Life and other works. A second daughter, Halley Feiffer is an actress and playwright.

His third marriage took place in September 2016, when he married freelance writer JZ Holden; the ceremony combined Jewish and Buddhist traditions. Holden is the author of Illusion of Memory (2013).

Feiffer lived in upstate New York with his wife and their two cats. Feiffer died from congestive heart failure at his home in Richfield Springs, New York on January 17, 2025, nine days before his 96th birthday.

== Honors and awards ==
- 1961, recipient of a George Polk Award for his cartoons
- 1961, film Munro won Academy Award for animated short
- 1969 and 1970, won Obie Award and Outer Circle Critics Award for plays Little Murders and The White House Murder Case;
- 1986, awarded the Pulitzer Prize for political cartoons
- 1989, recipient of an Inkpot Award
- 1989, won the Golden Osella for I Want to Go Home (1989).
- 1995, elected to the American Academy of Arts and Letters
- 2004, inducted into the Comic Book Hall of Fame
- 2004, received the National Cartoonists Society's Milton Caniff Lifetime Achievement Award
- 2006, received the Creativity Foundation's Laureate
- 2010, won a Lifetime Achievement Award from the Writers Guild of America
- 2023, won a Lifetime Achievement Award from the Dramatists Guild of America

== Selected works ==
- Sick, Sick, Sick (1958)
- Passionella and Other Stories (1959)
- The Explainers (1960)
- Boy, Girl, Boy, Girl (1961)
- The Feiffer Album (1962)
- Hold Me! (1962)
- Harry: The Rat with Women, a Novel (1963)
- Feiffer's Album (1963)
- The Unexpurgated Memoirs of Bernard Mergendeiler (1964)
- The Great Comic Book Heroes (1965)
- Feiffer on Civil Rights (1966)
- The Penguin Feiffer (1966)
- Feiffer's Marriage Manual (1967)
- Pictures at a Prosecution (1971)
- Feiffer on Nixon, the Cartoon Presidency (1974)
- Knock Knock (1976)
- Tantrum (1979)
- Jules Feiffer's America: From Eisenhower to Reagan (1982)
- Marriage Is an Invasion of Privacy and Other Dangerous Views (1984)
- Feiffer's Children (1986)
- Ronald Reagan in Movie America (1988)
- The Man in the Ceiling (1993)
- A Barrel of Laughs, a Vale of Tears (1995)
- Meanwhile— (1997)
- I Lost My Bear (1998)
- Bark, George (1999)
- Backing into Forward: A Memoir (2010)
- Smart George (2020)
- Amazing Grapes (2024)
